= 2019–20 College Football Playoff =

Postseason college football tournament

- Season: 2019
- Dates: December 28, 2019 – January 13, 2020
- Teams invited: (1) LSU; (2) Ohio State; (3) Clemson; (4) Oklahoma
- Venues: Mercedes-Benz Stadium; Mercedes-Benz Superdome; State Farm Stadium
- Champions: LSU (1st CFP title, 4th overall title)

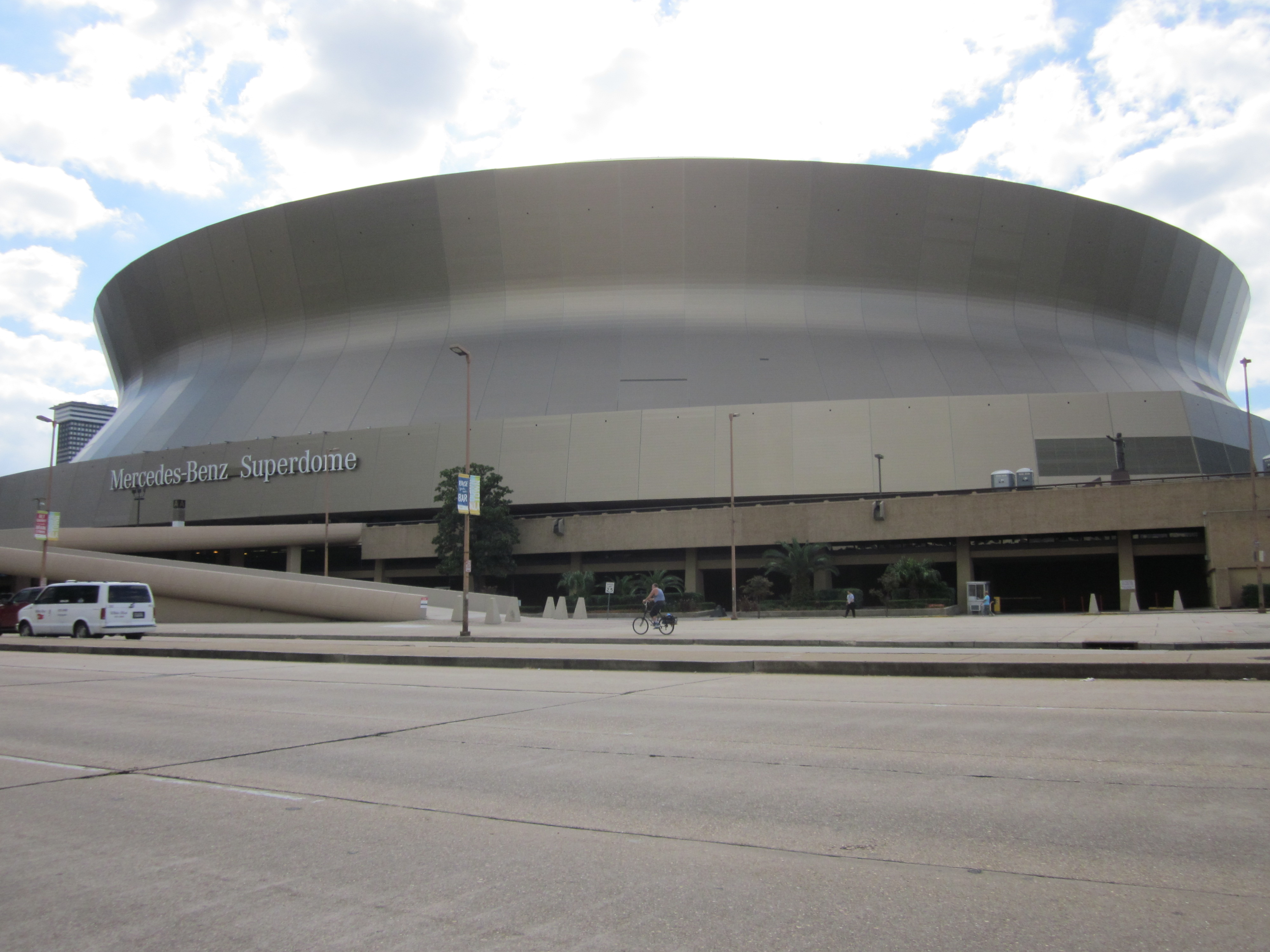
The Mercedes-Benz Superdome in New Orleans, Louisiana, hosted the College Football Playoff National Championship.

The 2019–20 College Football Playoff was a single-elimination postseason tournament that determined the national champion of the 2019 NCAA Division I FBS football season. It was the sixth edition of the College Football Playoff (CFP) and involved the top four teams in the country as ranked by the CFP poll playing in two semifinals, with the winners of each advancing to the national championship game. Each participating team was the champion of its respective conference: No. 1 LSU from the Southeastern Conference, No. 2 Ohio State from the Big Ten Conference, No. 3 Clemson from the Atlantic Coast Conference, and No. 4 Oklahoma from the Big 12 Conference.

The playoff bracket's semifinal games were held at the Peach Bowl and the Fiesta Bowl on December 28, 2019, part of the season's slate of bowl games. The Peach Bowl semifinal saw LSU defeat Oklahoma by a margin of thirty-five points, and Clemson defeated Ohio State by six points in the Fiesta Bowl semifinal. Following their semifinal wins, LSU and Clemson advanced to the national championship game, held on January 13 in New Orleans. In the championship game, LSU beat Clemson 42–25, to win their first CFP national championship. LSU's win marked their fourth national championship in school history, the first since 2007.

The playoff games, which were all broadcast on ESPN, averaged 21.65 million viewers, a 4% increase from the previous edition. The championship game received 25.59 million viewers, making it the most-viewed cable broadcast since the 2018 College Football Playoff National Championship.

== Bracket ==
Semifinals
December 28 – Peach Bowl Mercedes-Benz Stadium, Atlanta
1	LSU	63
4	Oklahoma	28
December 28 – Fiesta Bowl State Farm Stadium, Glendale
2	Ohio State	23
3	Clemson	29

Championship
January 13 – National Championship Mercedes-Benz Superdome, New Orleans
1	LSU	42
3	Clemson	25

== Selection and teams ==
The selection committee members are chosen by the CFP's management committee, (Note: The management committee consists of the commissioners of the ten FBS conferences and the athletic director of Notre Dame, an FBS independent.) which also appoints the selection committee chair. Members serve three-year terms and are not eligible for reappointment, except under select circumstances. (Note: Selection committee members may exceed the three-year limit if they are appointed to chair the committee during their third and final year, or if they are first appointed to finish another member's incomplete term.) The 2019–20 CFP selection committee was chaired by Oregon athletic director Rob Mullens. Its other members were Iowa athletic director Gary Barta, former Virginia Tech head coach Frank Beamer, former The Arizona Republic reporter Paola Boivin, Oklahoma athletic director Joe Castiglione, former head coach Ken Hatfield, Robert Morris University president Christopher B. Howard, former NFL player Ronnie Lott, Arkansas State athletic director Terry Mohajir, USA Football chairman and former Army chief of staff Ray Odierno, former Texas A&M head coach R. C. Slocum, Georgia Tech athletic director Todd Stansbury, and Florida athletic director Scott Stricklin.

The first CFP rankings of the season were released on November 5, 2019. Ohio State from the Big Ten Conference led the poll, followed by No. 2 LSU and No. 3 Alabama from the Southeastern Conference (SEC) followed. The Big Ten was also represented by No. 4 Penn State; No. 5 Clemson from the Atlantic Coast Conference (ACC) and No. 6 Georgia, from the SEC, rounded out the top six. The ensuing week's games saw two top-six teams lose: No. 2 LSU defeated No. 3 Alabama, 46–41, and No. 4 Penn State suffered an upset loss at No. 17 Minnesota. As a result of their losses, Alabama dropped to No. 5 and Penn State to No. 9; LSU jumped Ohio State for the No. 1 spot despite the latter's 59-point win over unranked Maryland the week prior. After rising to No. 8, Minnesota lost to No. 20 Iowa the next week, dropping them down to No. 10, though the top seven remained the same in the November 19 rankings. The slate of games played on November 23 included a win by No. 2 Ohio State over No. 8 Penn State and an upset loss by No. 6 Oregon to unranked Arizona State, causing minor changes in the following rankings: Ohio State returned to the No. 1 spot and Utah replaced Oregon at No. 6. A missed field goal by Alabama's Joseph Bulovas ended the team's final possession in their Iron Bowl rivalry game at No. 15 Auburn, sealing a three-point loss that "wiped away the ... Crimson Tide's playoff hopes" according to ESPN. Alabama dropped to No. 12 in the penultimate rankings—the Associated Press similarly reported that the team was certain to miss the playoff for the first time since the CFP's establishment.

During the following weekend, each conference played its respective championship game. The Pac-12 championship, played on December 6, resulted in an upset win for No. 13 Oregon over No. 5 Utah, all but ending Utah's playoff chances. Each of the top three teams in the CFP rankings won their conference championship: No. 1 Ohio State beat No. 8 Wisconsin in the Big Ten championship, No. 2 LSU defeated No. 4 Georgia to win the SEC championship, and No. 3 Clemson won the ACC championship over No. 23 Virginia. The Big 12 championship between No. 6 Oklahoma and No. 7 Baylor went into overtime before Oklahoma secured a seven-point win, prompting Oklahoma head coach Lincoln Riley and Big 12 commissioner Bob Bowlsby to advocate to the selection committee for OU's inclusion in the playoff field.

The College Football Playoff field, and the full final CFP rankings, were released on December 8, 2019. Pat Forde, writing for Sports Illustrated, said that the four-team field had the potential to be the strongest in CFP history and remarked that the only difficult decision for the committee to make was whether to rank LSU ahead of Ohio State or vice versa. Ultimately, LSU was picked No. 1 while Ohio State and Clemson followed at Nos. 2 and 3. Oklahoma jumped into the playoff field at No. 4 following their Big 12 championship victory. LSU and Oklahoma were assigned to the Peach Bowl semifinal while Ohio State and Clemson were set to play in the Fiesta Bowl semifinal. Pac-12 champions Oregon jumped to No. 6 in the final poll and were assigned to the Rose Bowl against No. 8 Wisconsin, while Georgia fell to No. 5 and were matched with No. 7 Baylor in the Sugar Bowl. No. 8 Florida and No. 24 Virginia were assigned to the Orange Bowl, and the Cotton Bowl Classic matched No. 10 Penn State and No. 17 Memphis.

2019 College Football Playoff rankings top six progression
No.	Week 10	Week 11	Week 12	Week 13	Week 14	Final
1	Ohio State (8–0)	LSU (9–0)	LSU (10–0)	Ohio State (11–0)	Ohio State (12–0)	LSU (13–0)
2	LSU (8–0)	Ohio State (9–0)	Ohio State (10–0)	LSU (11–0)	LSU (12–0)	Ohio State (13–0)
3	Alabama (8–0)	Clemson (10–0)	Clemson (10–0)	Clemson (11–0)	Clemson (12–0)	Clemson (13–0)
4	Penn State (8–0)	Georgia (8–1)	Georgia (9–1)	Georgia (10–1)	Georgia (11–1)	Oklahoma (12–1)
5	Clemson (9–0)	Alabama (8–1)	Alabama (9–1)	Alabama (10–1)	Utah (11–1)	Georgia (11–2)
6	Georgia (7–1)	Oregon (8–1)	Oregon (9–1)	Utah (10–1)	Oklahoma (11–1)	Oregon (11–2)

Key: Team increased ranking from previous week Team decreased ranking from previous week Team selected to College Football Playoff

== Playoff games ==
=== Semifinals ===
==== Peach Bowl ====
2019 Peach Bowl

Quarter	1	2	3	4	Total
No. 4 Oklahoma	7	7	7	7	28
No. 1 LSU	21	28	7	7	63

at Mercedes-Benz Stadium • Atlanta, Georgia

- Date: December 28, 2019
- Game time: 4:00 p.m. EST

The Peach Bowl semifinal matched No. 4 Oklahoma and No. 1 LSU for the third time; each of their prior meetings had also occurred in the postseason, with Oklahoma winning the 1950 Sugar Bowl and LSU winning the 2004 Sugar Bowl. (Note: The 2004 Sugar Bowl was the designated Bowl Championship Series national championship game for the 2003 season.) LSU took the lead with a touchdown on their first possession of the game and never relinquished it; Oklahoma did not score until their third possession while LSU ended seven of their first nine drives of the game with touchdowns. The Tigers led 21–7 after the first quarter and 49–14 at halftime; a three-and-out in the first quarter and a missed field goal in the fourth were their only non-scoring drives before the final possession of the game, which ended with a quarterback kneel. LSU quarterback and Heisman Trophy winner Joe Burrow passed for seven touchdowns in the first half, four of which were caught by wide receiver Justin Jefferson, and Burrow rushed for another touchdown in the third quarter en route to a 63–28 semifinal victory for the Tigers. LSU's 63 total points marked a new CFP single-game record, as did the Tigers' 49 first half points and nearly 700 yards of total offense. Burrow and Jefferson also each broke several single-game CFP records, including for passing touchdowns (7), receiving touchdowns (4), and receiving yards (227).

==== Fiesta Bowl ====
2019 Fiesta Bowl

Quarter	1	2	3	4	Total
No. 3 Clemson	0	14	7	8	29
No. 2 Ohio State	10	6	0	7	23

at State Farm Stadium • Glendale, Arizona

- Date: December 28, 2019
- Game time: 8:00 p.m. EST

Clemson and Ohio State's matchup in the Fiesta Bowl semifinal marked their fourth meeting all-time; Clemson had won all three of the previous games, most recently at the 2016 Fiesta Bowl, also a CFP semifinal. Ohio State took an early lead with a field goal on its first possession; Clemson had the same opportunity, but their kick was missed, and running back J. K. Dobbins scored a rushing touchdown for the Buckeyes on the next play from scrimmage, giving them a 10–0 lead. The lead stretched to 16 points before Clemson's first score, a second-quarter rush by running back Travis Etienne. Quarterback Trevor Lawrence scored Clemson's second touchdown on their next drive, narrowing the Tigers' halftime deficit to two points. The teams traded touchdowns in the second half before Clemson retook the lead with under two minutes to play on a pass from Lawrence to Etienne; Ohio State's ensuing drive was cut short by an interception by safety Nolan Turner, which gave possession back to Clemson and allowed them to close out a six-point victory.

=== Championship game ===
2020 College Football Playoff National Championship

Quarter	1	2	3	4	Total
No. 3 Clemson	7	10	8	0	25
No. 1 LSU	7	21	7	7	42

at Mercedes-Benz Superdome • New Orleans, Louisiana

- Date: January 13, 2020
- Game time: 7:00 p.m. CST

LSU and Clemson advanced to the national championship following their respective semifinal victories. It marked the teams' third meeting; LSU won the first two games, the 1959 Sugar Bowl and the 1996 Peach Bowl, and Clemson won the most recent matchup at the 2012 Chick-fil-A Bowl. Each team scored once in the first quarter: Clemson on a Lawrence rush and LSU on a pass from Burrow to wide receiver Ja'Marr Chase. After a Clemson field goal early in the second quarter, the teams traded touchdowns again before LSU took their first lead on another Burrow-to-Chase pass with 5:19 in the half. Another LSU passing touchdown, this time to tight end Thaddeus Moss, gave LSU an eleven-point lead at halftime. Clemson scored on their first possession of the second half and opted to try a two-point conversion, which was successful. Those points were the last of the game for Clemson, as LSU grew their lead on passing touchdowns in the third and fourth quarters to conclude a 42–25 national championship victory.

== Aftermath ==
LSU's national championship victory improved their record to 15–0, marking the first time an LSU team completed a season with that record. It was the fourth national championship in school history—the first since 2007—and the first to take place in the CFP era. Dennis Dodd, writing for CBS Sports, called LSU's squad a "forever team" and said that they should be considered among the greatest college football teams of all time.

The championship game saw a 3% year-over-year increase in viewership. It recorded a total of 25.59 million viewers, the most for any cable broadcast since 2018, and peaked in the second quarter with 29.2 million viewers. The three-game playoff, all of which was broadcast on ESPN, averaged 21.65 million viewers, a 4% increase from the 2018–19 edition of the CFP.
