= 2019 LSU vs. Alabama football game =

American college football game

2019 LSU vs. Alabama
- "Game of the Century"
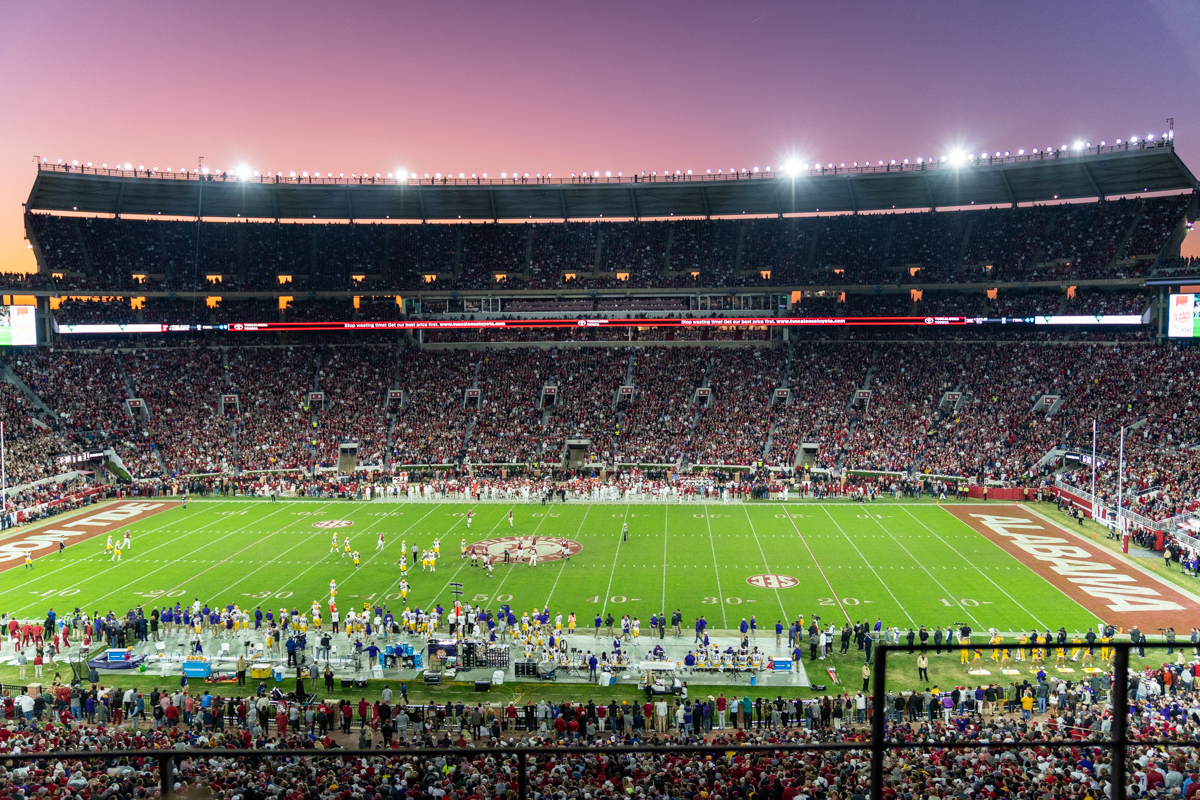
LSU Tigers	Alabama Crimson Tide
(8–0)	(8–0)
46	41
Head coach: Ed Orgeron	Head coach: Nick Saban
AP / Coaches / CFP; 1 / 2 / 2	AP / Coaches / CFP; 2 / 1 / 3
	1	2	3	4	Total
LSU	10	23	0	13	46
Alabama	7	6	7	21	41
- Date: November 9, 2019
- Season: 2019
- Stadium: Bryant–Denny Stadium
- Location: Tuscaloosa, Alabama
- Favorite: Alabama by 6.5
- Referee: John McDaid
- Halftime show: Million Dollar Band
- Attendance: 101,821

United States TV coverage
- Network: CBS
- Announcers: Brad Nessler (play-by-play); Gary Danielson (color); Jamie Erdahl (sideline)
- Nielsen ratings: 9.7

The 2019 LSU vs. Alabama football game was a regular-season college football game between the LSU Tigers (ranked number 1 in the AP Poll) and the Alabama Crimson Tide (ranked number 2) on November 9, 2019, at Bryant–Denny Stadium in Tuscaloosa, Alabama. The game is considered a "Game of the Century", as it pitted the two top-ranked teams in the NCAA Division I Football Bowl Subdivision, and it was the first such regular-season game since the 2011 LSU vs. Alabama game. Both teams entered the game undefeated and tied for first place in the Southeastern Conference's West Division.

The Tigers offense, led by quarterback and future Heisman Trophy winner Joe Burrow, dominated the first half of the game and led at halftime by a score of 33–13. The Crimson Tide responded with a stronger performance in the second half, with running back Najee Harris scoring two touchdowns in the third and fourth quarters to bring the score to 33–27. The fourth quarter saw both teams trade touchdowns, with a collective 34 points scored in the quarter. Ultimately, the Tigers managed to prevent an Alabama comeback and won with a final score of 46–41.

Following the game, the Tigers won all of their remaining regular season games and defeated the Georgia Bulldogs in the 2019 SEC Championship Game en route to a number-1 berth in the College Football Playoff. They defeated the Oklahoma Sooners in the 2019 Peach Bowl semifinal and the Clemson Tigers in the 2020 National Championship to finish the season as undefeated champions with a 15–0 record. Alabama, meanwhile, won all of their remaining regular season games except for their matchup against the Auburn Tigers. In the postseason, they beat the Michigan Wolverines in the 2020 Citrus Bowl to finish the season with an 11–2 record.

== Pre-game buildup ==
The football teams representing the University of Alabama and Louisiana State University played their first game against each other in 1895. Both schools were founding members of the Southeastern Conference (SEC), which was established in 1932, and the football teams have played each other annually since 1964. Going into the 2019 season, Alabama held more wins in the all-time series record, which was 53–25–5. Both teams compete in the SEC's West Division.

At the start of the 2019 season, Alabama and LSU were ranked No. 2 and No. 6, respectively, in both the AP Poll and the Coaches Poll. By October 14, the AP Poll had Alabama and LSU ranked No. 1 and No. 2, respectively. These rankings held going into their matchup on November 9, making the game the first "Game of the Century" matchup between the two top-ranked teams in the nation since the 2011 LSU vs. Alabama game, which LSU won 9–6. However, since that game, Alabama had won eight straight games against the Tigers leading up to their 2019 matchup, including the 2012 BCS National Championship Game. The 2019 game was a home game for the Crimson Tide. The winner of the game was expected to be a strong contender to make the SEC Championship Game and the College Football Playoff, and both teams starting quarterbacks (Joe Burrow for LSU and Tua Tagovailoa for Alabama) were considered frontrunners for the Heisman Trophy. Several news sources expected the game to be high-scoring with a predicted combined score of around 60 points. The over–under was 64 and Alabama was favored by 6.5 points. On the day of the game, ESPN's Football Power Index gave Alabama a 71.8 percent chance of winning.

=== LSU ===
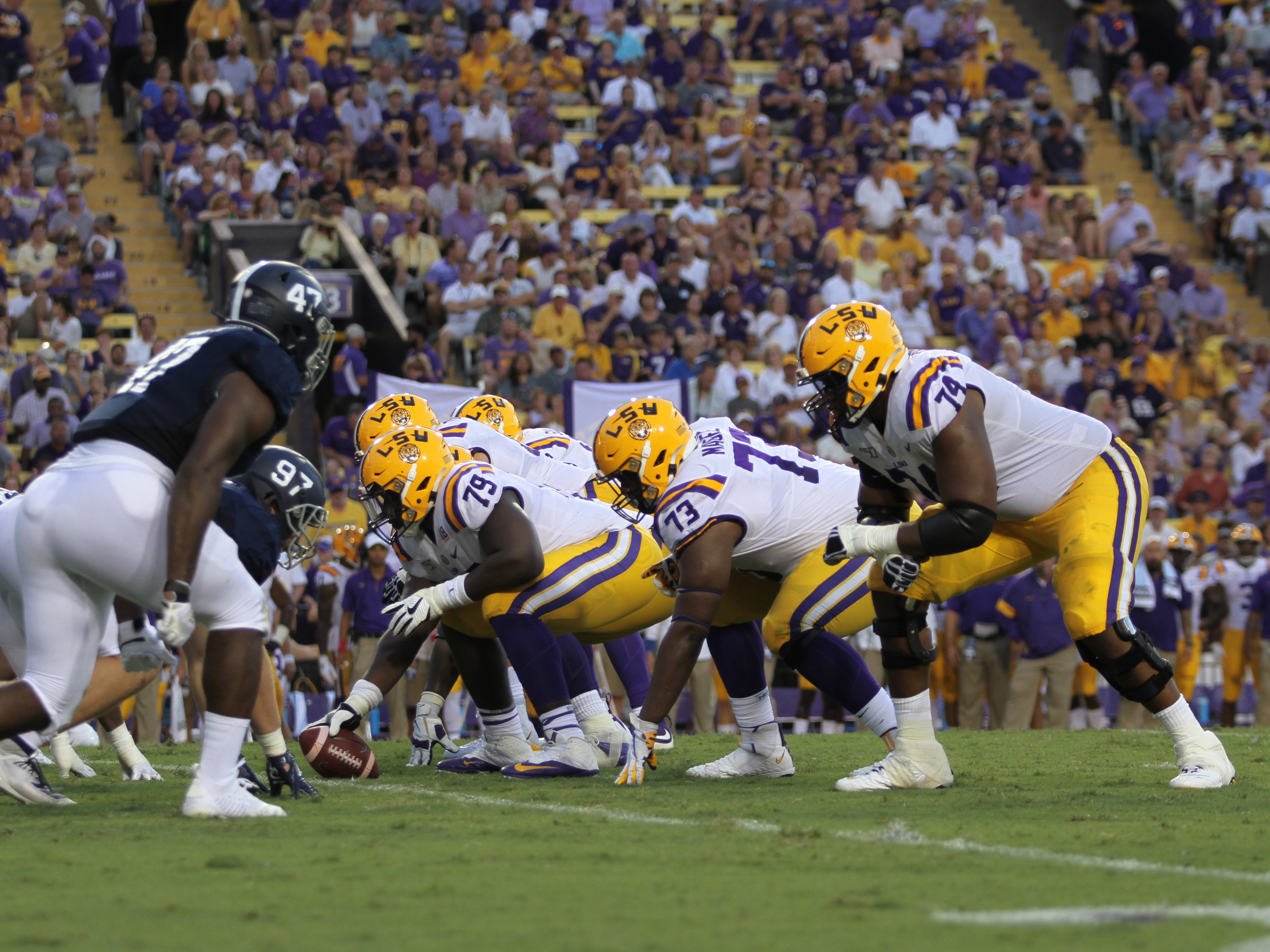
The LSU offense against the Georgia Southern Eagles

In the preseason, LSU was ranked No. 6 in both the AP and Coaches Polls. In their season opener, they defeated the Georgia Southern Eagles with a score of 55–3. With the offense using a new spread scheme, Burrow threw five touchdown passes, tying a school record. The next week, the No. 6 Tigers traveled to take on the No. 9 Texas Longhorns in a matchup between two top-10 teams. The Tigers prevailed in a close game with a score of 45–38, as Burrow threw four touchdown passes and placekicker Cade York scored three field goals. Following the win, LSU moved up to No. 4 in the AP Poll before a September 14 home win against the Northwestern State Demons of the Football Championship Subdivision.

Conference play for the Tigers began with their fourth game of the season, a road win against the Vanderbilt Commodores, during which Burrow threw six touchdown passes, setting a new school record. Following a bye week, LSU hosted the Utah State Aggies in a game where Burrow again threw five touchdown passes and became the first quarterback in LSU history to throw for over 300 yards in four straight games. Afterwards, the Tigers had a three week stretch of SEC games, including an October 12 home game against the No. 7 Florida Gators, an October 19 road game against the Mississippi State Bulldogs, and an October 26 home game against the No. 9 Auburn Tigers. LSU won all three games and, following the Florida game, rose to No. 2 in the AP Poll. The Tigers then had another bye week leading up to their game against the No. 1 Alabama Crimson Tide on November 9.

Coming into the game, LSU ranked second in the SEC for points per game (46.8) and yards per play (7.5) and were tied with Alabama for most plays that resulted in a gain of over 40 yards (13). Those 46.8 points per game also ranked fourth nationally. In his eight games for the season, Burrow had passed for 2,805 yards with a completion percentage of 78.8, the highest percentage among qualified passers in the nation. He was averaging 10.8 yards per completion and had thrown 30 touchdown passes and only four interceptions. Prior to the game, Athlon Sports called Ja'Marr Chase, Justin Jefferson, and Terrace Marshall Jr. arguably the best group of wide receivers besides Alabama's. On defense, LSU had the second-best run defense in the conference (with opposing teams managing an average of 2.95 yards per carry), the fifth-best pass rush (with 20 quarterback sacks), and the sixth-best pass efficiency defense (allowing just 13 touchdown passes). Additionally, Athlon called cornerbacks Kristian Fulton and Derek Stingley Jr. "arguably the best in college football".

=== Alabama ===
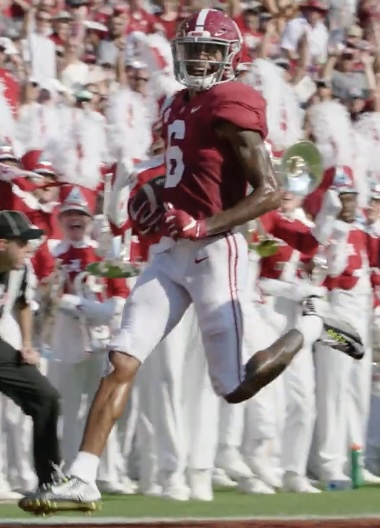
DeVonta Smith during the Crimson Tide's game against the Ole Miss Rebels

In the preseason, Alabama was ranked No. 2 in both the AP and Coaches Poll, second only to the Clemson Tigers, who had beat Alabama in last season's National Championship game. In Week 1, Alabama played the Duke Blue Devils in the Chick-fil-A Kickoff Game, dominating them with a final score of 42–3. Tagovailoa threw four touchdown passes and accumulated over 300 passing yards in the game. In their first home game the following week, the Crimson Tide beat the New Mexico State Aggies 62–10 before beginning conference play with a road win over the South Carolina Gamecocks. Alabama then beat the Southern Miss Golden Eagles and the Ole Miss Rebels by more than four touchdowns in back-to-back weeks, with wide receiver DeVonta Smith setting school records in the latter game with 274 yards and five touchdowns.

Following the win over Ole Miss, Alabama moved to No. 1 before an October 12 road game against the No. 24 Texas A&M Aggies, the Crimson Tide's first ranked opponent of the season. Alabama won the game, which saw Tagovailoa break the school record of 80 passing touchdowns in a career, previously held by A. J. McCarron. Next week, the Crimson Tide hosted the Tennessee Volunteers in a winning effort, during which Tagovailoa suffered an ankle injury. Mac Jones served as the starting quarterback for the following game against the Arkansas Razorbacks, which Alabama won by 41 points. Following this, the Crimson Tide had another bye week before their game against LSU. In the days leading up to the game, it was unsure if Tagovailoa would play due to his injury, with head coach Nick Saban saying that it would be a game-time decision. However, Tagovailoa ultimately was able to play.

Coming into the game, Alabama ranked second in the nation (and first in the conference) in points per game (48.6), with the offense averaging 168 rushing yards per game. Tagovailoa had a completion percentage of 74.7, passing for 2,166 yards, including nine passes that resulted in a gain of at least 40 yards. He had thrown 27 touchdown passes and only two interceptions. The team had what Athlon called "the nation's best receiving corps", consisting of Smith, Jerry Jeudy, Henry Ruggs, and Jaylen Waddle, who had a combined 24 touchdown receptions that season. On defense, the Crimson Tide had held opposing teams to only 15.2 points per game and had allowed only one play that resulted in a gain of at least 40 yards. The defense kept opposing teams to just 4.54 yards per play, ranking 14th in the nation.

== Game summary ==
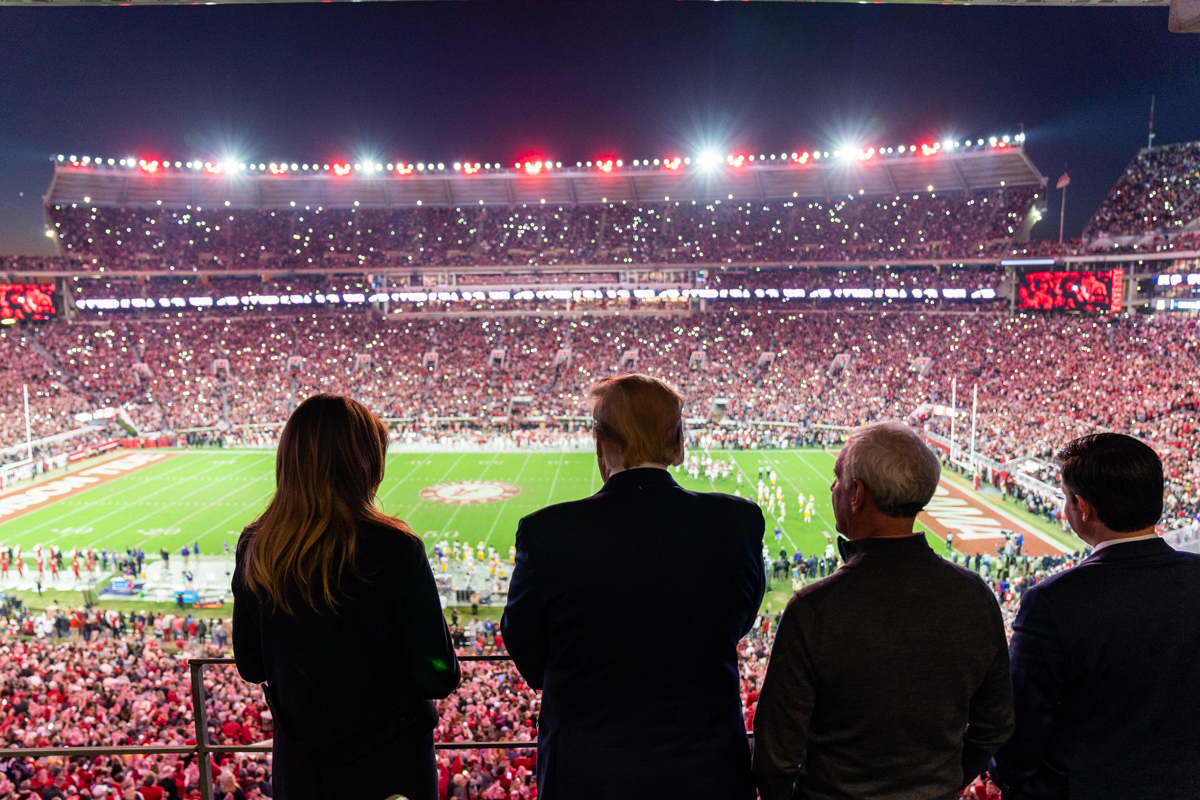
First Lady Melania Trump (left) and President Donald Trump (second from left) watching the game

The game was scheduled for kickoff at 2:30 p.m. CST, though this was pushed back to 2:42 p.m. ESPN broadcast their pre-game show College GameDay live from Alabama's campus in Tuscaloosa, Alabama, where a sell-out crowd of 101,821 were in attendance at Bryant–Denny Stadium. ESPN-owned SEC Network's pregame show SEC Nation also broadcast live from Tuscaloosa. Among those in attendance were President Donald Trump and First Lady Melania Trump, who watched the game from a luxury box with other Republican politicians. The Million Dollar Band performed a halftime show tribute to the United States Armed Forces, as the game took place over Veterans Day weekend. The game was broadcast nationwide on CBS as part of SEC on CBS. The broadcast team consisted of Brad Nessler as the play-by-play commentator, Gary Danielson as the color commentator, Jamie Erdahl as the sideline reporter, and Gene Steratore as the rules analyst (contributing from CBS's New York studios). CBS's pregame show, led by host Adam Zucker with analysts Rick Neuheisel and Brian Jones, also broadcast live from Tuscaloosa. The broadcast averaged a 9.7 Nielsen rating, making it the highest-rated regular season game since the 2011 LSU vs. Alabama game. The broadcast averaged 16.64 million viewers, reaching a 15-minute average peak of 20.61 million. John McDaid served as the game's referee.

=== First quarter ===
LSU won the coin toss and elected to defer, giving Alabama possession of the ball to start the game. Avery Atkins performed a 65-yard kickoff that was received by Henry Ruggs, who returned it 29 yards to start the Crimson Tide's first series at their own 29-yard line. From here, a 20-yard pass to Ruggs and a 31-yard rush by Najee Harris put the team into LSU territory. However, the Crimson Tide's positive momentum stalled and on third down, Tagovailoa fumbled, with Ray Thornton recovering the ball for LSU at their own 8-yard line. In their first possession, LSU started with two rushing plays from Clyde Edwards-Helaire to give them a first down at their 19-yard line. A short run from Burrow and a pass to Chase moved them to near midfield, and a pass to Justin Jefferson put the Tigers at the Alabama 33-yard line. A pass from Burrow to Chase resulted in the first touchdown of the game, putting the Tigers up 7–0.

Atkins then kicked a touchback and Alabama started their next drive at their 25-yard line. A 15-yard pass from Tagovailoa to Jeudy, as well as a horse-collar tackle penalty against LSU, moved them to the LSU 45-yard line. However, two incomplete passes and a 4-yard run from Harris put them at fourth down when Ty Perine fumbled and recovered for a loss of 19 yards, giving LSU possession at the Alabama 40-yard line. Two penalties against Alabama and rushing plays from Edwards-Helaire and Burrow put the Tigers at fourth down at Alabama's 22, where York scored a 40-yard field goal, bringing the score to 10–0. With about five minutes left in the quarter, the Tigers kicked a touchback and Alabama started at their 25. After two runs and an incomplete pass, Perine punted from the Alabama 29, with Stingley returning it to the LSU 28. A short run, a sack, and a short pass followed, and the Tigers punted from their 22. The punt was returned 77 yards by Waddle for a touchdown, putting the Tide on the board with a score of 10–7. Joseph Bulovas kicked off to the Tigers, with Edwards-Helaire returning the ball to the LSU 25. The Tigers were able to move to their own 35 before the first quarter ended, giving them a first down to start the next quarter.

=== Second quarter ===
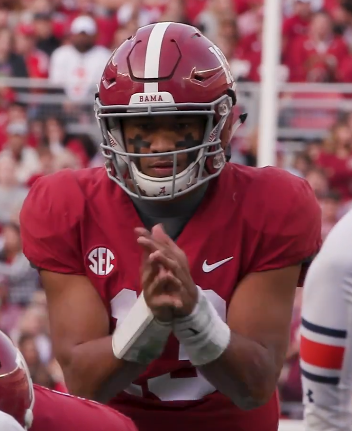
Tua Tagovailoa threw four touchdown passes for Alabama.

Two passes by Burrow to Edwards-Helaire and Jefferson put LSU into Alabama's territory, and the Tigers scored shortly thereafter with a 29-yard pass to Marshall. A blocked extra point attempt by York kept the score at 16–7. A touchback then placed Alabama at their 25 to begin their first drive of the quarter. After an incomplete pass and a short run, a 20-yard pass to Jeudy put the Crimson Tide around midfield. Following a false start penalty on Alabama, the Tide completed two short passes and two short runs, but were unable to gain 15 yards, resulting in a turnover on downs at the LSU 49. Burrow completed a short pass to Thaddeus Moss, who fumbled but recovered. Two short runs followed before that put them at fourth and 1 at Alabama's 42, but after getting a delay of game penalty against them, they punted, with Zach Von Rosenberg putting it out-of-bounds at Alabama's 9. Following a false start penalty against Alex Leatherwood, the Crimson Tide were able to reach the first down with a Jeudy reception that put them on their own 36. This was followed by a 65-yard touchdown pass to Smith, which brought the score to 16–13 after a failed extra point attempt.

After a touchback, the Tigers started on their own 25, but a 35-yard pass to Chase put them on Alabama's 40. Another few plays moved them up to Alabama's 19, but following a sack that put LSU at 4th & 17 at the Alabama 27, York was brought in to make a 45-yard field goal, making the score 19–13. Ruggs returned the subsequent kickoff to put Alabama at their own 28. After several plays and a delay of game penalty, they had not progressed by their fourth down and decided to punt, with Stingley returning the ball to the LSU 39. Two rushes from Burrow put the Tigers on the Alabama 31, and two passes put them at Alabama's 1, resulting in a 1-yard Edwards-Helaire touchdown run that brought the score to 26–13. After receiving the kickoff at their own 29, Tagovailoa threw an interception that put the Tigers on Alabama's 26. A personal foul against Landon Dickerson put the Tigers at the 13, and they scored a touchdown on their next play with a pass to Edwards-Helaire, resulting in a score of 33–13. Alabama received the ball on their 30 and attempted one play, which resulted in a loss of yards, before the end of the half.

=== Third quarter ===
Following a touchback, the Tigers started the second half from their 25. After several plays, they had progressed to Alabama's 36, but a fumble resulting from a sack gave Alabama possession on their own 42. However, the Crimson Tide did not capitalize and after an incomplete pass and two runs, they punted on fourth down, resulting in the Tigers gaining possession at their own 20 following a touchback. The Tigers progressed to around midfield, but after several short plays and a delay of game penalty, they punted from their own 49. Alabama gained possession at their own 5 and began a drive up the field that brought them to the LSU 49. A 22-yard pass to Ruggs put them on the LSU 27 and four plays later, Harris received a touchdown pass from Tagovailoa that brought the score to 33–20. After another touchback, the Tigers drove to midfield, where they stalled and eventually punted from their own 49. A fair catch by Waddle put Alabama in possession at their own 22, and a 14-yard run by Harris started their drive. A holding penalty against LSU gave Alabama another 10 yards, and a 32-yard pass to Smith put them solidly in LSU's territory. The Crimson Tide ended the third quarter on 3rd & 2 at LSU's 14.

=== Fourth quarter ===
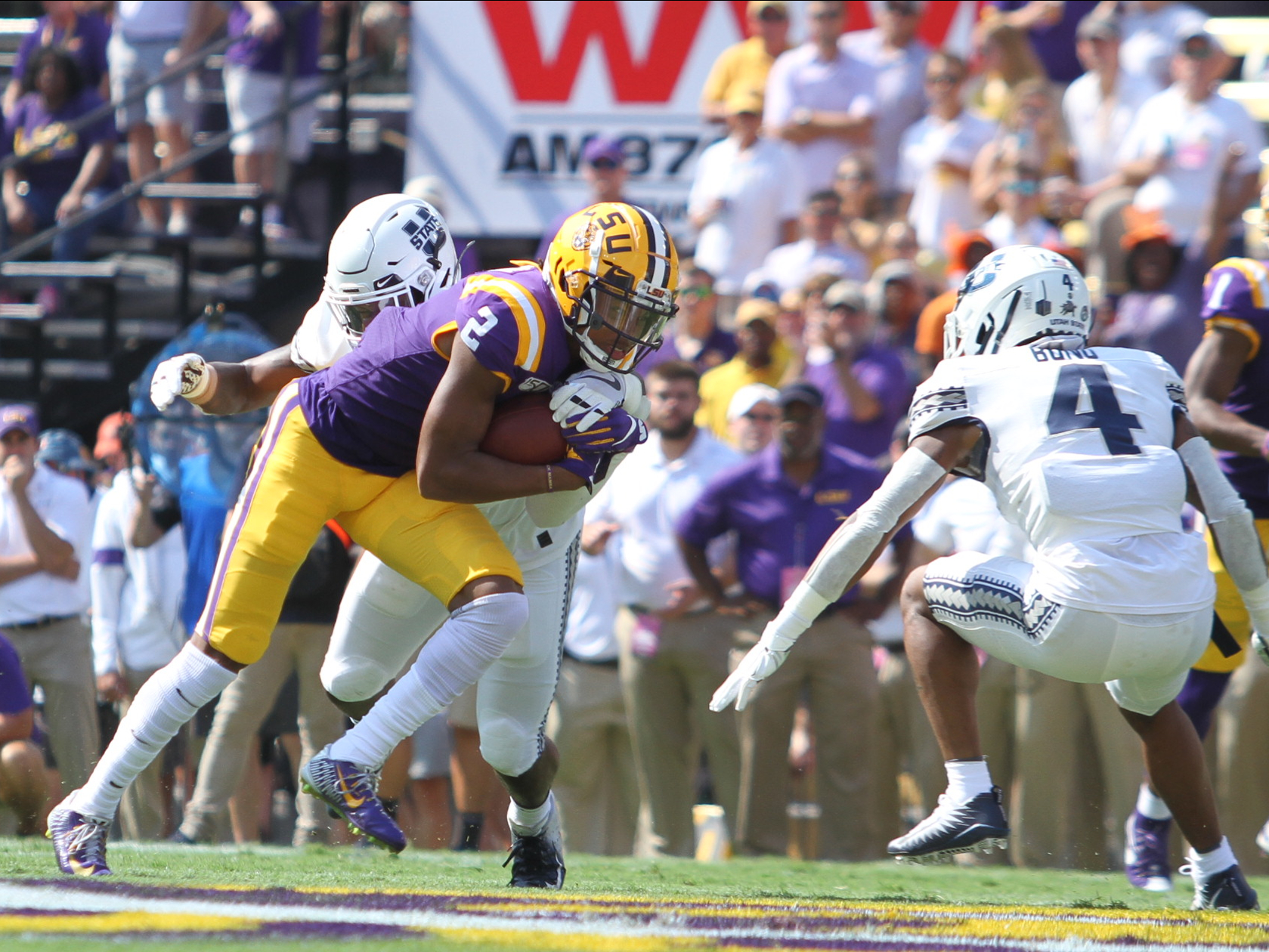
Justin Jefferson recovered the Crimson Tide's onside kick, allowing the Tigers to run out the clock with a 46–41 lead.

Alabama started the fourth quarter with a 12-yard run that put them one yard from the end zone, with a rushing touchdown from Harris coming two plays later that brought the score to 33–27. Starting at their own 25 following a touchback, the Tigers began a drive up the field, maintaining possession of the ball for about four and a half minutes. The drive ended in a five-yard rushing touchdown by Edwards-Helaire, and after a failed two-point conversion, the score stood at 39–27. Alabama began their drive at their 25-yard line following a touchback and embarked on a similarly long drive. A 5-yard pass from Tagovailoa to Jeudy capped the drive with a touchdown that brought the score to 39–34, still a one-possession game. With about five minutes left in the game, LSU began their next possession at their 25-yard line. A 29-yard pass to Chase followed shortly thereafter by a 17-yard pass to Jefferson put the Tigers on Alabama's 33. A short pass to Moss, followed by an 18-yard rush by Burrow, put them on the Alabama 7, and Edwards-Helaire picked up a rushing touchdown on the next play, bringing the score to 46–34 with only 1:37 remaining in the game. Ruggs returned the kickoff to the Alabama 15-yard line and on the next play, Tagovailoa connected with Smith for an 85-yard touchdown pass, cutting the deficit to five points with 1:21 remaining. Needing to maintain possession of the ball for a chance to win, Alabama attempted an onside kick, but it was recovered by Jefferson on the Alabama 49. The Tigers made a few plays that put them around Alabama's 40-yard line and allowed them to run out the clock, with a final score of 46–41.

=== Scoring summary ===
Scoring summary

Quarter	Time	Drive			Team	Scoring information	Score	
Quarter	Time	Plays	Yards	TOP	Team	Scoring information	LSU	Alabama
1	9:15	6	92	2:46	LSU	Ja'Marr Chase 33-yard touchdown reception from Joe Burrow, Cade York kick good	7	0
1	4:54	5	18	3:11	LSU	40-yard field goal by Cade York	10	0
1	1:14	3	3	2:17	Alabama	Punt returned 77 yards for touchdown by Jaylen Waddle, Joseph Bulovas kick good	10	7
2	13:03	8	75	3:11	LSU	Terrace Marshall Jr. 29-yard touchdown reception from Joe Burrow, Cade York kick no good (blocked)	16	7
2	6:43	4	90	1:20	Alabama	DeVonta Smith 64-yard touchdown reception from Tua Tagovailoa, Joseph Bulovas kick no good	16	13
2	4:20	7	48	2:23	LSU	45-yard field goal by Cade York	19	13
2	0:26	8	61	2:13	LSU	Clyde Edwards-Helaire 1-yard touchdown run, Cade York kick good	26	13
2	0:06	1	26	0:05	LSU	Clyde Edwards-Helaire 13-yard touchdown reception from Joe Burrow, Cade York kick good	33	13
3	4:51	10	95	3:30	Alabama	Najee Harris 15-yard touchdown reception from Tua Tagovailoa, Joseph Bulovas kick good	33	20
4	14:33	9	78	3:37	Alabama	Najee Harris 1-yard touchdown run, Joseph Bulovas kick good	33	27
4	10:07	12	75	4:26	LSU	Clyde Edwards-Helaire 5-yard touchdown run, 2-point pass failed	39	27
4	5:32	14	75	4:35	Alabama	Jerry Jeudy 5-yard touchdown reception from Tua Tagovailoa, Joseph Bulovas kick good	39	34
4	1:37	7	75	3:55	LSU	Clyde Edwards-Helaire 7-yard touchdown run, Cade York kick good	46	34
4	1:21	1	85	0:16	Alabama	DeVonta Smith 85-yard touchdown reception from Tua Tagovailoa, Joseph Bulovas kick good	46	41
"TOP" = time of possession. For other American football terms, see Glossary of American football.							46	41

== Statistical summary ==
Statistical comparison
	LSU	Alabama
1st downs	29	22
Total yards	559	541
Passing yards	393	418
Rushing yards	166	123
Penalties	4–35	7–53
3rd down conversions	8–15	6–15
Turnovers	1	2
Time of Possession	34:34	25:26

The game is noted for the strong offensive showing from both teams. The 46 points are the most LSU has scored against Alabama, and both teams scoring considerably more than in their previous "Game of the Century", which was considered a defensive battle.

For the Tigers, Joe Burrow completed 31 of 39 attempted passes for 393 yards, with 3 touchdowns and no interceptions. Ja'Marr Chase was his top receiver, making 6 receptions for 140 yards and 1 touchdown, and Clyde Edwards-Helaire was the top rusher, recording 20 carries for 103 yards and 3 touchdowns. On defense, K'Lavon Chaisson led the team in tackles with 10, including 5 solo and 3.5 tackles for loss. Both Rashard Lawrence and Patrick Queen recorded half a sack.

For the Crimson Tide, Tua Tagovailoa completed 21 of 40 attempted passes for 418 yards, with 4 touchdowns and 1 interception. DeVonta Smith was his top receiver, making 7 receptions for 213 yards and 2 touchdowns, and Najee Harris was the top rusher, recording 19 carries for 146 yards and 1 touchdown. On defense, Xavier McKinney led the team in tackles with 13 total, including 9 solo and 2.5 tackles for loss. Both he and Anfernee Jennings recorded 2 sacks.

== Aftermath ==
=== LSU ===
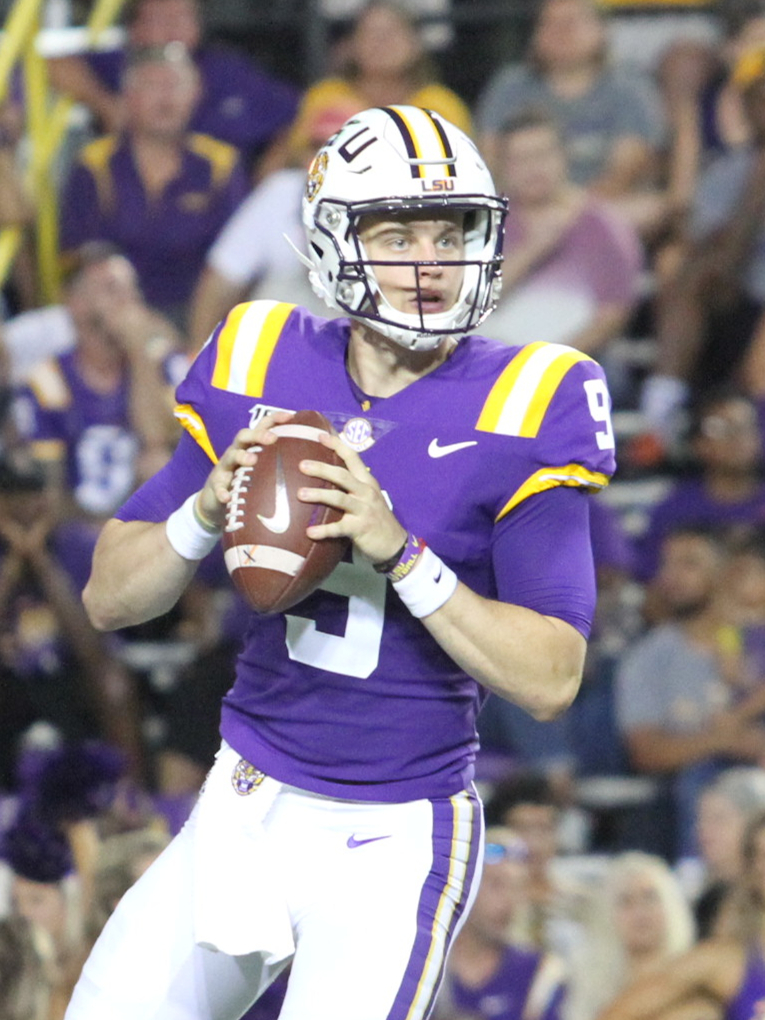
Joe Burrow was awarded the Heisman Trophy later in the season.

Following the game, LSU remained No. 1 in the AP Poll and was elevated to that rank in the Coaches Poll and the CFP Rankings. The team finished their regular season with conference wins over the Ole Miss Rebels, the Arkansas Razorbacks, and the Texas A&M Aggies, in the process securing a position in the SEC Championship Game against the Georgia Bulldogs. The Tigers (who had dropped back down to No. 2 in the CFP Rankings) beat the No. 4 Bulldogs, in the process securing a No. 1 berth in the College Football Playoff in the Peach Bowl semifinal against the Oklahoma Sooners, who they beat 63–28. LSU finished their season by defeating the Clemson Tigers in the CFP Championship game on January 13, 2020, to claim the national title. The team is one of only three in the modern era of college football to complete a perfect 15-game season, joining the 2018 Clemson Tigers and later being matched by the 2022 Georgia Bulldogs and the 2023 Michigan Wolverines. Several sources list them as one of the best college football teams of all time.

Joe Burrow's performance in the game helped to establish him as the main frontrunner for the Heisman Trophy, which is awarded annually to the best overall player in college football. Burrow won the award on December 14, becoming only the second player in LSU history to receive the honor.

=== Alabama ===
With the loss, Alabama's streak of 31 consecutive home game victories was snapped, and the Crimson Tide dropped to No. 4 in the AP and Coaches Polls and No. 5 in the CFP Rankings. They rebounded and gained wins in their next two games against the Mississippi State Bulldogs and the Western Carolina Catamounts, but lost Tua Tagovailoa to a season-ending injury in the former game. Going into their November 30 game against the Auburn Tigers (with whom they share a rivalry known as the Iron Bowl), they were ranked No.5 in the CFP Rankings and were still considered in contention to make the College Football Playoff. However, Auburn won, ending their chances at earning a playoff berth. The Crimson Tide dropped to No. 14 in the rankings and were selected to play the Michigan Wolverines in the Citrus Bowl, a game they won 35–16.

=== NFL first-round draft picks ===
Nineteen of the players from both teams who competed in the game later went on to be first-round draft picks in the annual National Football League Draft in 2020, 2021, and 2022.

- Alabama
  - Najee Harris
  - Jerry Jeudy
  - Mac Jones
  - Alex Leatherwood
  - Evan Neal
  - Henry Ruggs
  - DeVonta Smith
  - Patrick Surtain II
  - Tua Tagovailoa
  - Jaylen Waddle
  - Jedrick Wills
- LSU
  - Joe Burrow
  - K'Lavon Chaisson
  - Ja'Marr Chase
  - Clyde Edwards-Helaire
  - Justin Jefferson
  - Patrick Queen
  - Derek Stingley Jr.
