= 2019 Peach Bowl =

College Football Playoff Semifinal bowl game

2019 Chick-fil-A Peach Bowl
- College Football Playoff Semifinal; 52nd Peach Bowl
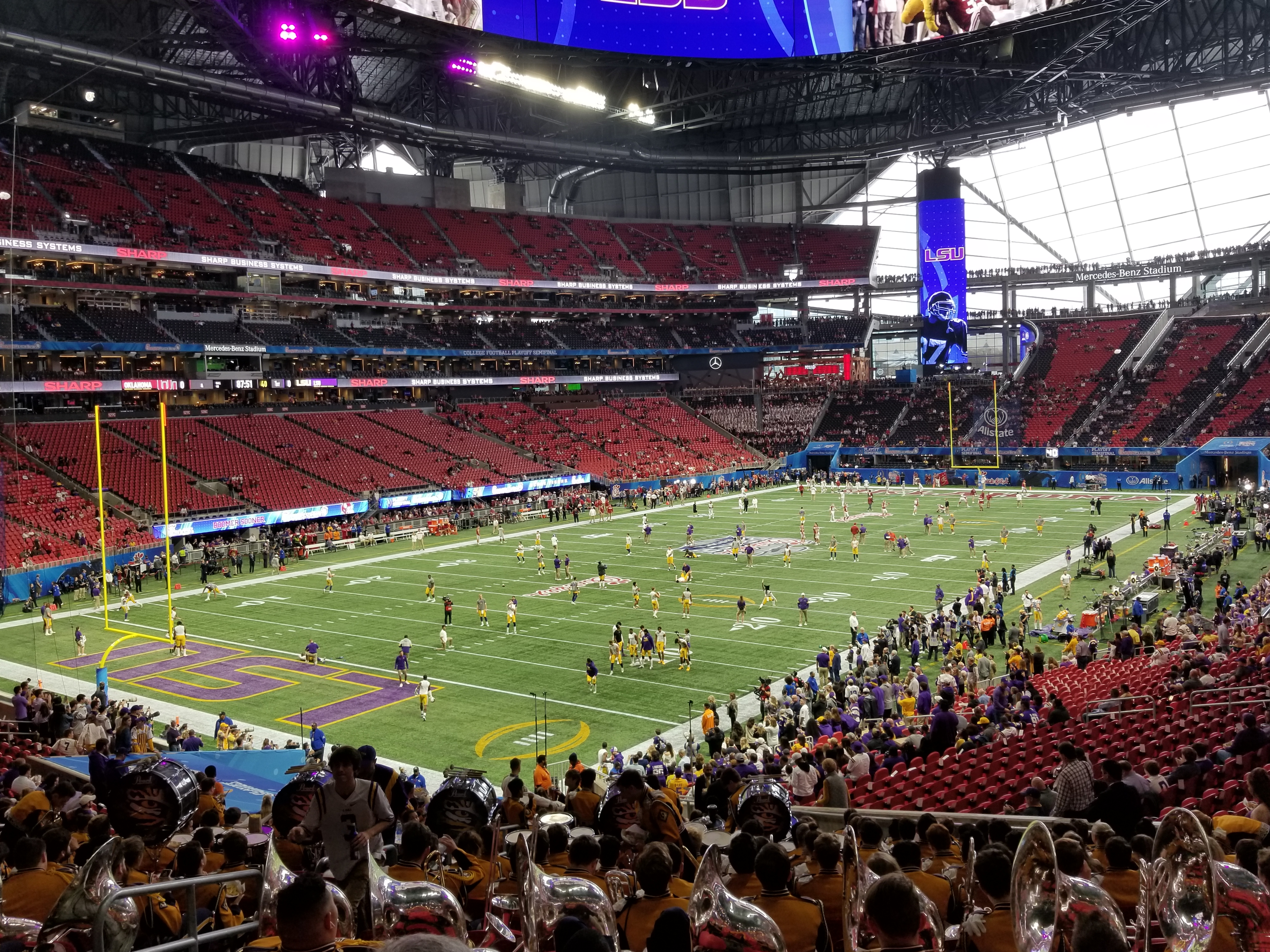
- Mercedes-Benz Stadium prior to kickoff
Oklahoma Sooners	LSU Tigers
(12–1)	(13–0)
Big 12	SEC
28	63
Head coach: Lincoln Riley	Head coach: Ed Orgeron
AP / Coaches / CFP; 4 / 4 / 4	AP / Coaches / CFP; 1 / 1 / 1
	1	2	3	4	Total
Oklahoma	7	7	7	7	28
LSU	21	28	7	7	63
- Date: December 28, 2019
- Season: 2019
- Stadium: Mercedes-Benz Stadium
- Location: Atlanta, Georgia
- MVP: Joe Burrow (QB, LSU); K'Lavon Chaisson (LB, LSU)
- Favorite: LSU by 12½
- Referee: Stuart Mullins (ACC)
- Halftime show: Louisiana State University Tiger Marching Band; The Pride of Oklahoma Marching Band
- Attendance: 78,347

United States TV coverage
- Network: ESPN and ESPN Radio
- Announcers: ESPN: Sean McDonough (play-by-play); Todd Blackledge (analyst); Holly Rowe and Laura Rutledge (sideline); ESPN Radio: Steve Levy, Brian Griese and Todd McShay, Molly McGrath
- Nielsen ratings: 9.5 (17.2 million viewers)

International TV coverage
- Network: ESPN Deportes

The 2019 Peach Bowl (known for sponsorship reasons as the 2019 Chick-Fil-A Peach Bowl) was a college football bowl game played on December 28, 2019, at Mercedes-Benz Stadium in Atlanta, with kickoff at 4:00 p.m. EST on ESPN. It was the 52nd edition of the Peach Bowl, and was one of the 2019–20 bowl games concluding the 2019 FBS football season. The Peach Bowl was one of two College Football Playoff semifinal games, which pitted two of the four teams selected by the College Football Playoff Selection Committee—Oklahoma of the Big 12, and LSU from the SEC, with the winner advancing to face the winner of the Fiesta Bowl in the 2020 College Football Playoff National Championship. LSU dominated Oklahoma, with the score 49-14 at the half. They won, 63-28, in the first CFP game to have a team score 60+ points. Sponsored by restaurant chain Chick-fil-A, the game was officially known as the College Football Playoff Semifinal at the Chick-fil-A Peach Bowl.

== College Football Playoff ==
Semifinals
December 28 – Peach Bowl Mercedes-Benz Stadium, Atlanta
1	LSU	63
4	Oklahoma	28
December 28 – Fiesta Bowl State Farm Stadium, Glendale
2	Ohio State	23
3	Clemson	29

Championship
January 13 – National Championship Mercedes-Benz Superdome, New Orleans
1	LSU	42
3	Clemson	25

== Teams ==
This was the third meeting between Oklahoma and LSU. The series was tied 1–1; Oklahoma won the 1950 Sugar Bowl, 35–0, while LSU won the 2004 Sugar Bowl, 21–14.

=== Oklahoma Sooners ===
Oklahoma defeated Baylor in the 2019 Big 12 Championship Game on December 7, then received their bid to the Peach Bowl with the release of final CFP rankings on December 8. The Sooners entered the bowl with a 12–1 record (8–1 in conference); their only loss was to Kansas State, 48–41. This was Oklahoma's first appearance in the Peach Bowl, and their fourth College Football Playoff appearance. Oklahoma was 0–3 in prior CFP semifinals, most recently losing to Alabama in the 2018 Orange Bowl.

On December 18, media outlets reported that starting defensive end Ronnie Perkins and two other Oklahoma players had received suspensions and would not play in the game. On December 20, it was reported that starting safety Delarrin Turner-Yell would also miss the game, due to a broken collarbone. On December 23, head coach Lincoln Riley confirmed that Perkins and the two other players would not play, and said that he did not expect Turner-Yell to play.

=== LSU Tigers ===
LSU defeated Georgia in the 2019 SEC Championship Game on December 7, then received their bid to the Peach Bowl with the release of final CFP rankings on December 8. The Tigers entered the bowl with a 13–0 record (8–0 in conference). In six prior Peach Bowl appearances, the Tigers were 5–1, with their only defeat coming in their most recent appearance, a 2012 loss to Clemson in the then-Chick-fil-A Bowl. This was LSU's first College Football Playoff semifinal appearance.

== Game summary ==
College Football Playoff Semifinal at the 2019 Chick-fil-A Peach Bowl

Quarter	1	2	3	4	Total
No. 4 Oklahoma	7	7	7	7	28
No. 1 LSU	21	28	7	7	63

at Mercedes-Benz Stadium • Atlanta, Georgia

- Date: Saturday, December 28, 2019
- Game time: 4:00 p.m. EST
- Game weather: Indoors (roof closed)
- Game attendance: 78,347
- Referee: Stuart Mullins
- TV announcers (ESPN): Sean McDonough (play-by-play), Todd Blackledge (analyst), Holly Rowe and Laura Rutledge (sideline)
- ESPN game summary

Game information

First Quarter

- (12:03) LSU – Joe Burrow 19 yard pass to Justin Jefferson, Cade York kick (Drive: 3 plays, 42 yards, 0:52; LSU 7–0)
- (7:34) OKLA – Kennedy Brooks 3 yard rush, Gabe Brkic kick (Drive: 5 plays, 69 yards, 2:21; Tied 7–7)
- (4:24) LSU – Joe Burrow 8 yard pass to Terrace Marshall Jr., Cade York kick (Drive: 9 plays, 75 yards, 2:59; LSU 14–7)
- (1:16) LSU – Joe Burrow 35 yard pass to Justin Jefferson, Cade York kick (Drive: 6 plays, 86 yards, 2:31; LSU 21–7)

Second Quarter

- (12:13) LSU – Joe Burrow 42 yard pass to Justin Jefferson, Cade York kick (Drive: 6 plays, 80 yards, 2:02; LSU 28–7)
- (9:17) LSU – Joe Burrow 30 yard pass to Justin Jefferson, Cade York kick (Drive: 6 plays, 55 yards, 2:46; LSU 35–7)
- (4:45) OKLA – Jalen Hurts 2 yard rush, Gabe Brkic kick (Drive: 10 plays, 75 yards, 4:32; LSU 35–14)
- (4:18) LSU – Joe Burrow 62 yard pass to Thaddeus Moss, Cade York kick (Drive: 2 plays, 75 yards, 0:27; LSU 42–14)
- (0:50) LSU – Joe Burrow 2 yard pass to Terrace Marshall Jr., Cade York kick (Drive: 5 plays, 63 yards, 2:04; LSU 49–14)

Third Quarter

- (10:11) LSU – Joe Burrow 3 yard rush, Cade York kick (Drive: 13 plays, 74 yards, 4:40; LSU 56–14)
- (4:19) OKLA – Jalen Hurts 12 yard rush, Gabe Brkic kick (Drive: 13 plays, 75 yards, 5:52; LSU 56–21)

Fourth Quarter

- (9:39) OKLA – T.J. Pledger 1 yard rush, Gabe Brkic kick (Drive: 9 plays, 71 yards, 4:27; LSU 56–28)
- (3:59) LSU – John Emery Jr. 6 yard rush, Cade York kick (Drive: 9 plays, 75 yards, 5:40; LSU 63–28)

=== Statistics ===
Statistics	OKLA	LSU
First downs	16	31
Plays–yards	62–322	74–692
Rushes–yards	28–97	32–160
Passing yards	225	532
Passing: comp–att–int	16–34–1	32–42–0
Time of possession	27:02	32:58

Team	Category	Player	Statistics
Oklahoma	Passing	Jalen Hurts	15/31, 217 yards, 1 INT
Oklahoma	Rushing	Jalen Hurts	14 carries, 43 yards, 2 TD
Oklahoma	Receiving	CeeDee Lamb	4 receptions, 119 yards
LSU	Passing	Joe Burrow	29/39, 493 yards, 7 TD
LSU	Rushing	Chris Curry	16 carries, 89 yards
LSU	Receiving	Justin Jefferson	14 receptions, 227 yards, 4 TD

Joe Burrow threw seven touchdown passes in the first half, tying the NCAA records for touchdown passes in a half and touchdown passes in a bowl game. Four of the touchdowns were to Justin Jefferson, who set the College Football Playoff record for touchdown catches and the Peach Bowl record for receiving yards (227).
