= 2019 Fiesta Bowl (December) =

American college football game

2019 PlayStation Fiesta Bowl
- College Football Playoff Semifinal; 49th Fiesta Bowl
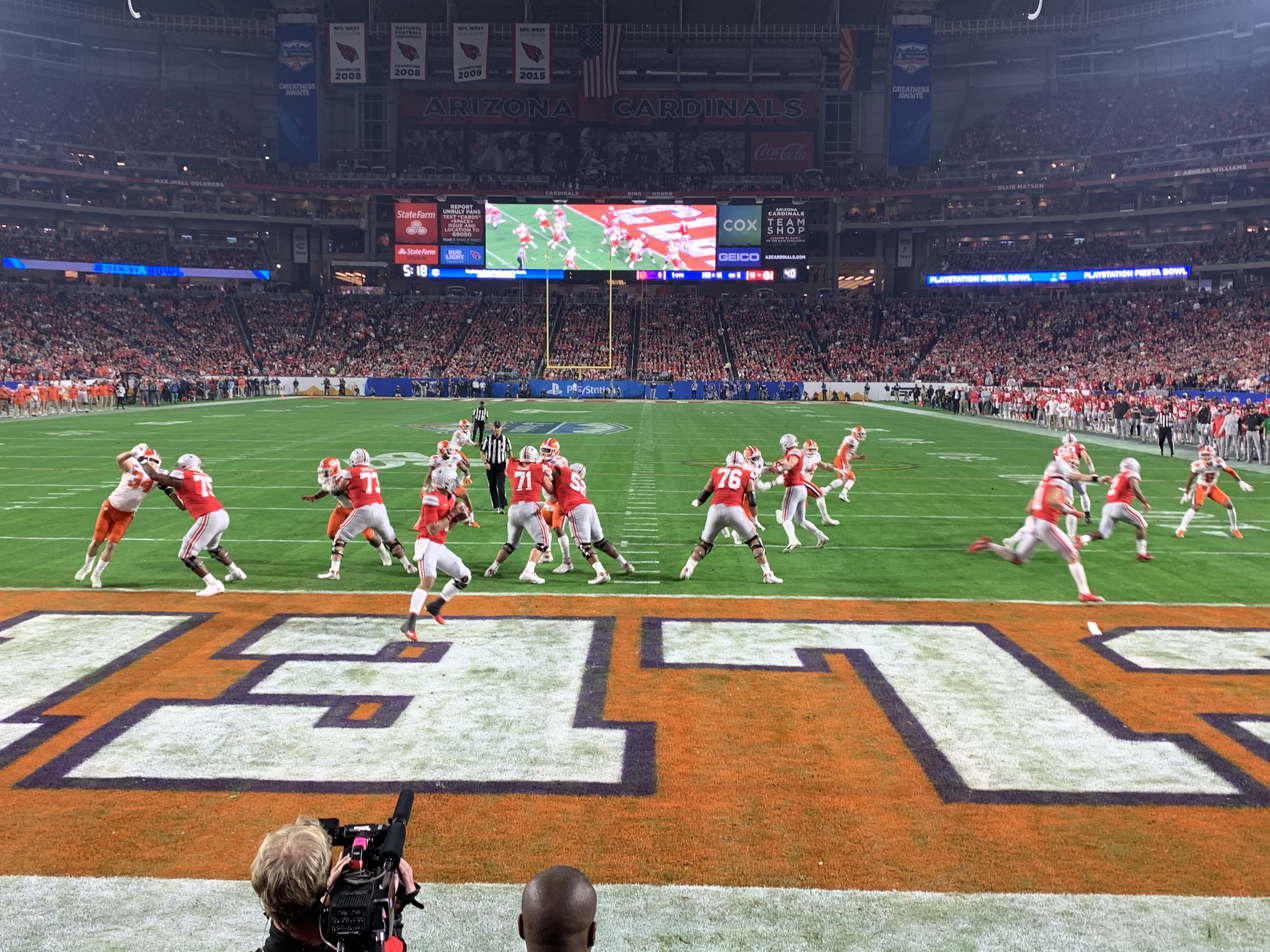
- Ohio State on offense in the 1st quarter
Clemson Tigers	Ohio State Buckeyes
(13–0)	(13–0)
ACC	Big Ten
29	23
Head coach: Dabo Swinney	Head coach: Ryan Day
AP / Coaches / CFP; 3 / 3 / 3	AP / Coaches / CFP; 2 / 2 / 2
	1	2	3	4	Total
Clemson	0	14	7	8	29
Ohio State	10	6	0	7	23
- Date: December 28, 2019
- Season: 2019
- Stadium: State Farm Stadium
- Location: Glendale, Arizona
- MVP: Trevor Lawrence (QB, Clemson); Chad Smith (LB, Clemson)
- Favorite: Clemson by 2½
- Referee: Ken Williamson (SEC)
- Halftime show: Clemson University Tiger Band; Ohio State University Marching Band
- Attendance: 71,330
- Payout: US$6,000,000

United States TV coverage
- Network: ESPN and ESPN Radio
- Announcers: ESPN: Chris Fowler (play-by-play); Kirk Herbstreit (analyst); Maria Taylor and Tom Rinaldi (sideline); ESPN Radio: Sean Kelley, Barrett Jones, Ian Fitzsimmons
- Nielsen ratings: 11.1 (21.2 million viewers)

International TV coverage
- Network: ESPN Deportes

The 2019 Fiesta Bowl was a college football bowl game played on December 28, 2019, played at State Farm Stadium in Glendale, Arizona, and was broadcast by ESPN. It was the 49th edition of the Fiesta Bowl, and was one of the 2019–20 bowl games concluding the 2019 FBS football season. The Fiesta Bowl was one of two College Football Playoff semifinal games, the game featured two of the four teams selected by the College Football Playoff Selection Committee—Clemson from the ACC, and Ohio State from the Big Ten, with the winner advancing to the 2020 College Football Playoff National Championship. Sponsored by Sony Interactive Entertainment via its PlayStation brand, the game was officially known as the College Football Playoff Semifinal at the PlayStation Fiesta Bowl.

Ohio State raced to a 16–0 lead with 7 minutes remaining in the first half, having three long drives to the red zone that were stopped by the Clemson defense. Clemson added two quick scores, within 95 seconds of each other, to cut the lead to 16-14 at halftime. The teams exchanged the lead three times throughout the second half. After Clemson scored to make it 29–23, Ohio State had one last chance to take the lead. quarterback Justin Fields led his team to the Clemson 23-yard line, but a pass meant for Chris Olave was intercepted in the endzone by Nolan Turner after a miscommunication, sealing the victory for Clemson.

With the win, Clemson advanced to the CFP National Championship where they would lose to LSU by a score of 42-25, while Ohio State's season came to an end.

== Teams ==
This was the fourth meeting between Clemson and Ohio State. The Tigers had won each of the prior three matchups, most recently defeating Ohio State 31-0 in the 2016 Fiesta Bowl. It was also the first CFP semifinals featuring two undefeated teams.

=== Ohio State Buckeyes ===
Ohio State entered the 2019 season led by first year head coach Ryan Day following the retirement of head coach Urban Meyer. The Buckeyes would roll through their schedule with ease winning every game by double digits and defeated Wisconsin in the Big Ten Championship Game to move to a 13–0 record. This was Ohio State's third College Football Playoff (CFP) semifinal game. The Buckeyes were 1–1 in prior CFP semifinals, their most recent appearance being a loss to Clemson in the 2016 Fiesta Bowl. Overall, Ohio State was 2–1 in prior CFP games, including their win over Oregon in the 2015 CFP National Championship. This was Ohio State's ninth appearance in the Fiesta Bowl; the Buckeyes were 5–3 in prior Fiesta Bowl games.

=== Clemson Tigers ===
Clemson entered the 2019 season as the defending national champions after winning their second national championship in three seasons in 2018. Clemson like Ohio State rolled though their schedule with ease winning every game but one by double digits and defeated Virginia in the ACC Championship Game to move to 13–0. The Fiesta Bowl marked Clemson's fifth consecutive CFP semifinal appearance. The Tigers' most recent loss had been to Alabama in the CFP semifinal Sugar Bowl on January 1, 2018; their 28 consecutive victories were the most in the nation and one of longest winning streaks in FBS history.

The Tigers were 3–1 in prior CFP semifinal games, most recently defeating Notre Dame in the 2018 Cotton Bowl. Including national championship contests, this was Clemson's eighth overall CFP game; they had a 5–2 record in prior CFP games, mostly recently defeating Alabama in the 2019 CFP National Championship. This was Clemson's second appearance in the Fiesta Bowl; they defeated Ohio State in the December 2016 edition.

== Game summary ==
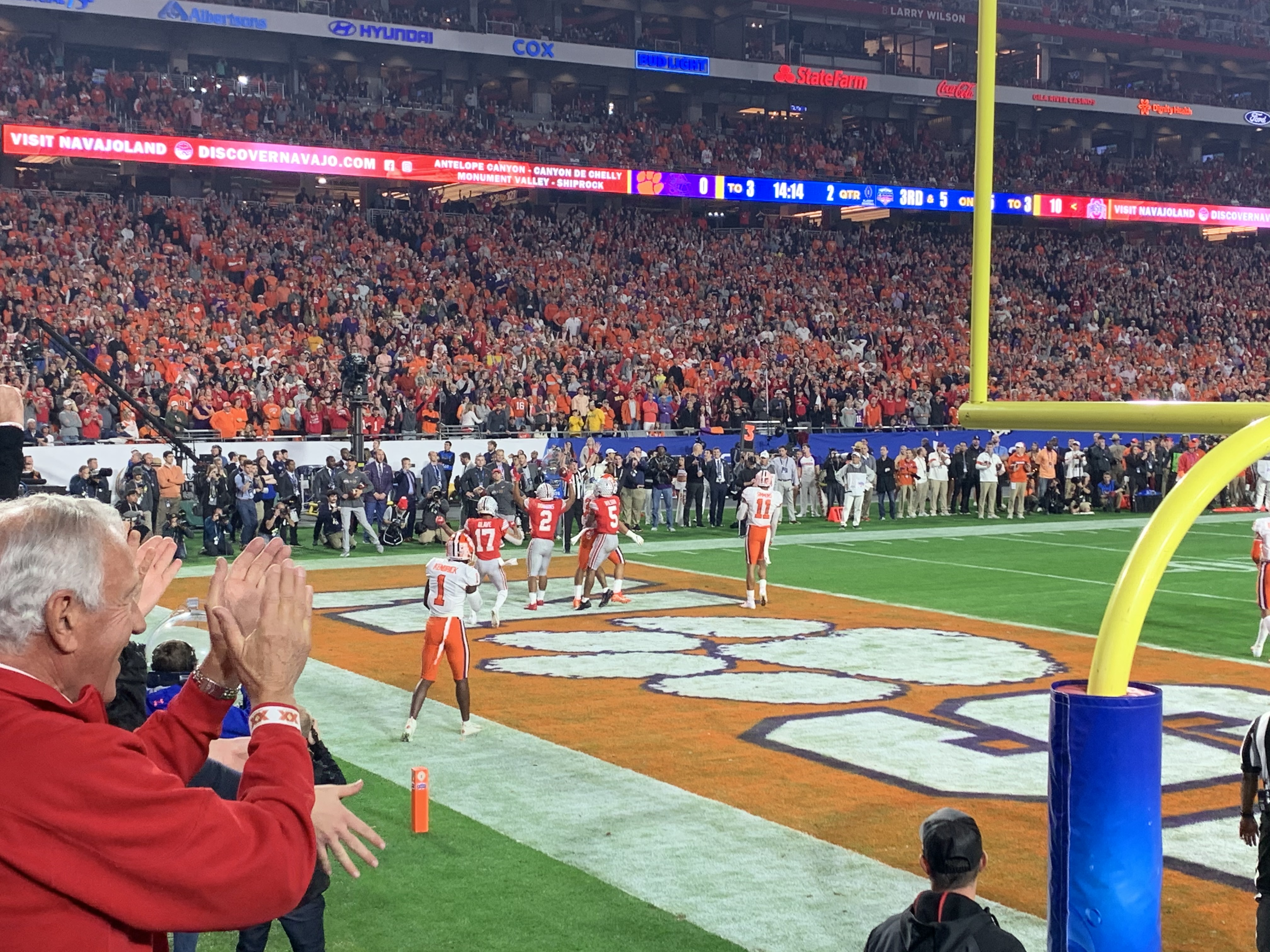
J.K. Dobbins and Ohio State celebrating his first quarter touchdown.

=== First half ===
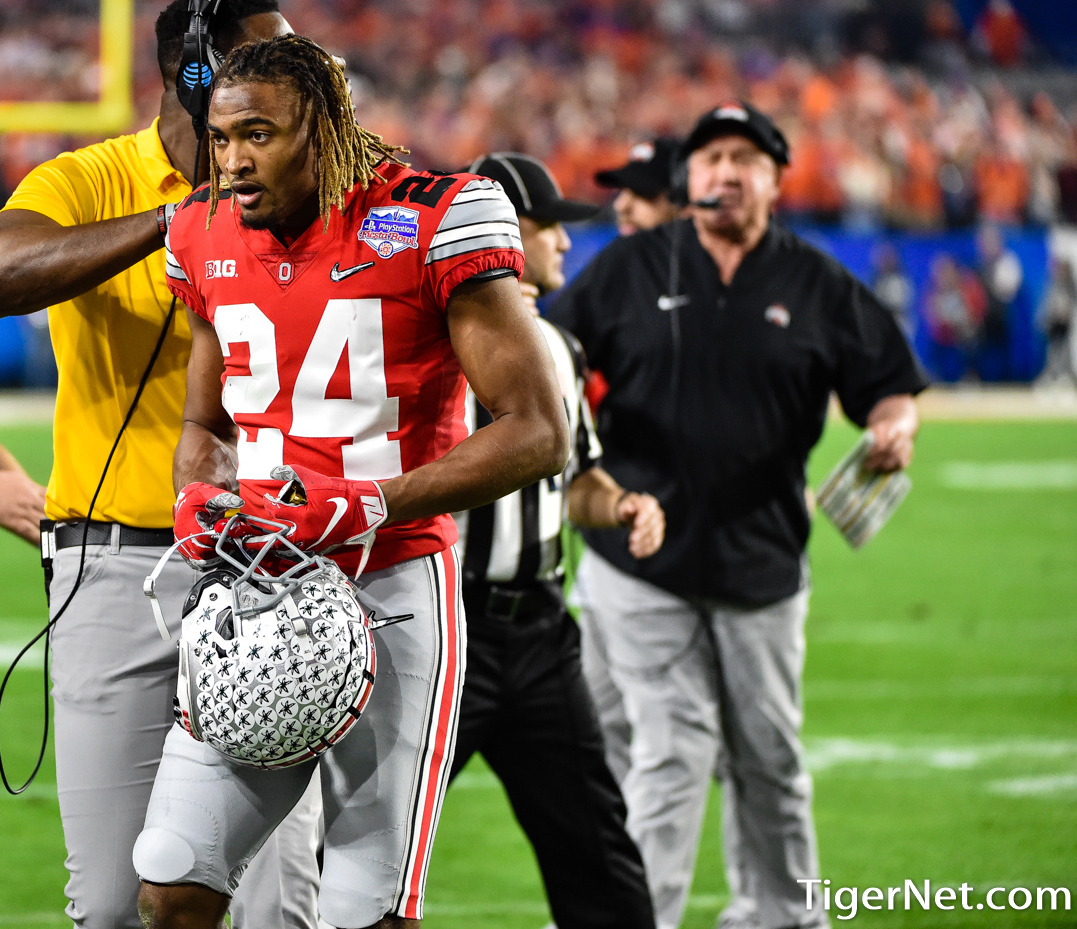
Shaun Wade immediately following his targeting penalty.

Clemson won the coin toss, and deferred possession to the second half, giving Ohio State the opening kickoff. Ohio State's offense started strong, marching down the field and following a difficult catch by Garrett Wilson found themselves at the 5 yard line but would be unable to reach the endzone, settling for a Blake Haubeil field goal to take a 3–0 lead. On their first possession, Clemson would drive to Ohio State's 32 before attempting a field goal that sailed wide left, keeping the score at 3–0. On the first play on the ensuing drive Ohio State's J.K. Dobbins broke free for a 68-yard touchdown run to give the Buckeyes a 10–0 lead. On the next drive Clemson would drive into Ohio State territory before stalling out and punting the ball to Ohio State, pinning the Buckeyes at their own 9-yard line. On their next possession, Ohio State would gain just 9 yards and would punt. Clemson's offense would fail to capitalize on the strong field position, going three and out and punting the ball for a touchback. Ohio State started their drive on their 25 and were soon faced with a 3rd and 2. On 3rd down and the final play of the first quarter, Dobbins would once again break free for a big run, running 64 yards to Clemson's 8 yard line before Tanner Muse made a shoestring tackle to prevent a touchdown. Ohio State began the second quarter with a 1st and goal on the Clemson 8 yard line and were soon faced with a 3rd and goal. On 3rd down, Dobbins swung out to the flat and appeared to catch a touchdown from Justin Fields, however upon video review it was ruled that Dobbins failed to make the catch, forcing Ohio State to once again settle for a field goal inside Clemson's 10 yard line, making the score 13–0. Following the Ohio State's score Clemson's offense would once again struggle, going 3 and out and punting. Ohio State would then drive 78 yards to Clemson's 11 yard line before kicking a field goal; their 3rd field goal inside the red zone, to make the score 16–0. On the ensuing drive Clemson would drive to the Ohio State 45. Following a failed 3rd down conversion Clemson's drive would stay alive on a Shaun Wade targeting penalty. Clemson would take advantage of this penalty with a Travis Etienne touchdown rush to cut the lead to 16–7 with 2:45 remaining in the half. Ohio State would then go 3 and out, punting the ball back to Clemson. On the third play of the drive, Trevor Lawerence would elude defenders running 67 yards for a touchdown, Clemson's second in less than 2 minutes to make the score 16–14 at the half.

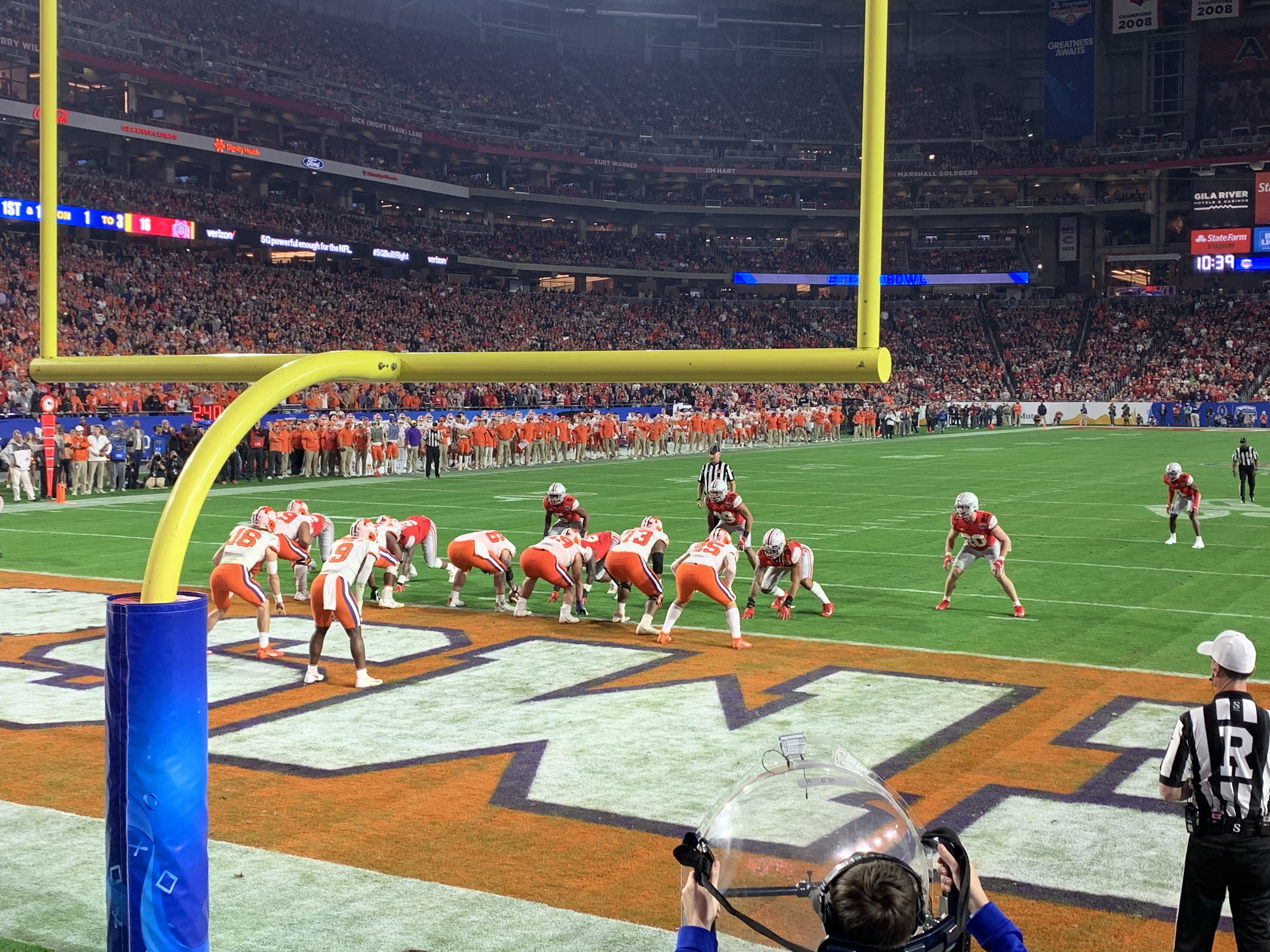
Clemson starts a drive on their own 1.

=== Second half ===
The two teams exchanged punts on their opening second half drives, with Ohio State's Drue Chrisman pinning Clemson at their own 1 yard line. Clemson would pick up a first down but were soon forced to punt. On the punt Ohio State would send pressure in an attempt to block the punt but would rough the punter and give Clemson a new set of downs. Two plays later Lawrence would connect with Etienne on a screen pass who then ran through defenders for a touchdown to make the score 21–16. Ohio State would lose yards on their next possession and were forced to punt. On the next drive, following a sack on Trevor Lawerence, Clemson was faced with a 3rd and 19. Lawrence would throw a pass to Justyn Ross who corralled the ball before it was jarred loose by Jeff Okudah, Ohio State would pick the ball up and run to the end zone. The referees and later video review would rule that Ross failed to establish possession of the ball before it was stripped negating an Ohio State touchdown that would have occurred if the play had been ruled a catch and fumble. Avoiding disaster, Clemson would punt the ball. On the following drive Isaiah Simmons would intercept a Justin Fields pass; the games first turnover. Clemson would fail to capitalize on the turnover, going three and out. Ohio State would then drive 16 yards to their 32-yard line as the quarter ended with Clemson leading 21–16. Ohio State began the fourth quarter facing a 3rd and 9. Fields would find Dobbins for 11 yards for the 3rd down conversion. Ohio State would drive to the Clemson 23 before being faced with a 4th down and 2 and elected to go for it. Fields would throw a bullet pass to Chris Olave in the end zone for a touchdown to take a 23–21 lead. Following a Clemson punt Ohio State would drive 50 yards to the Clemson 39 before being forced to punt, pinning Clemson on the 6. Clemson began their next drive on their own 6 yard line with 3:07 remaining in the game. Clemson would march 94 yards in just 4 plays capped of by a 32-yard touchdown pass from Lawrence to Etienne to retake the lead. Following a two point conversion, Clemson would hold a 29–23 lead with 1:49 remaining. Ohio State would then drive to the Clemson 23 with 43 seconds left. On the next play Ohio State had Olave one-on-one with Clemson cornerback Nolan Turner. Olave would run a post route as Fields threw the ball to the middle of the end zone. Olave with his back to Fields thus not knowing the ball had been thrown would option to corner route as he believed Fields was scrambling. Turner who was facing Fields was able to track the ball for an easy interception in the end zone, all but ending the game. On the next play Clemson would take a knee to end the game 29–23 and advance to the National Championship.

College Football Playoff Semifinal at the PlayStation Fiesta Bowl

Quarter	1	2	3	4	Total
No. 3 Clemson	0	14	7	8	29
No. 2 Ohio State	10	6	0	7	23

at State Farm Stadium • Glendale, Arizona

- Date: Saturday, December 28, 2019
- Game time: 8:00 p.m. EST
- Game weather: Indoors (roof closed)
- Game attendance: 71,330
- Referee: Ken Williamson (SEC)
- TV announcers (ESPN): Chris Fowler (play-by-play), Kirk Herbstreit (analyst), Maria Taylor, and Tom Rinaldi (sideline)
- ESPN game summary

Game information

First Quarter

- (12:03) OHST – Blake Haubeil 21 yard field goal (Drive: 10 plays, 71 yards, 2:57; Ohio State 3–0)
- (8:35) OHST – J. K. Dobbins 68 yard rush, Blake Haubeil kick (Drive: 1 play, 68 yards, 0:09; Ohio State 10–0)

Second Quarter

- (14:11) OHST – Blake Haubeil 22 yard field goal (Drive: 7 plays, 75 yards, 1:42; Ohio State 13–0)
- (7:20) OHST – Blake Haubeil 33 yard field goal (Drive: 14 plays, 70 yards, 4:55; Ohio State 16–0)
- (2:45) CLEM – Travis Etienne 8 yard rush, B.T. Potter kick (Drive: 10 plays, 75 yards, 4:35; Ohio State 16–7)
- (1:10) CLEM – Trevor Lawrence 67 yard rush, B.T. Potter kick (Drive: 5 plays, 83 yards, 0:45; Ohio State 16–14)

Third Quarter

- (7:54) CLEM – Trevor Lawrence 53 yard pass to Travis Etienne, B.T. Potter kick (Drive: 7 plays, 99 yards, 2:45; Clemson 21–16)

Fourth Quarter

- (11:46) OSU – Justin Fields 23 yard pass to Chris Olave, Blake Haubeil kick (Drive: 13 plays, 84 yards, 4:52; Ohio State 23–21)
- (1:49) CLEM – Trevor Lawrence 34 yard pass to Travis Etienne, 2-point pass good (Drive: 4 plays, 94 yards, 1:18; Clemson 29–23)

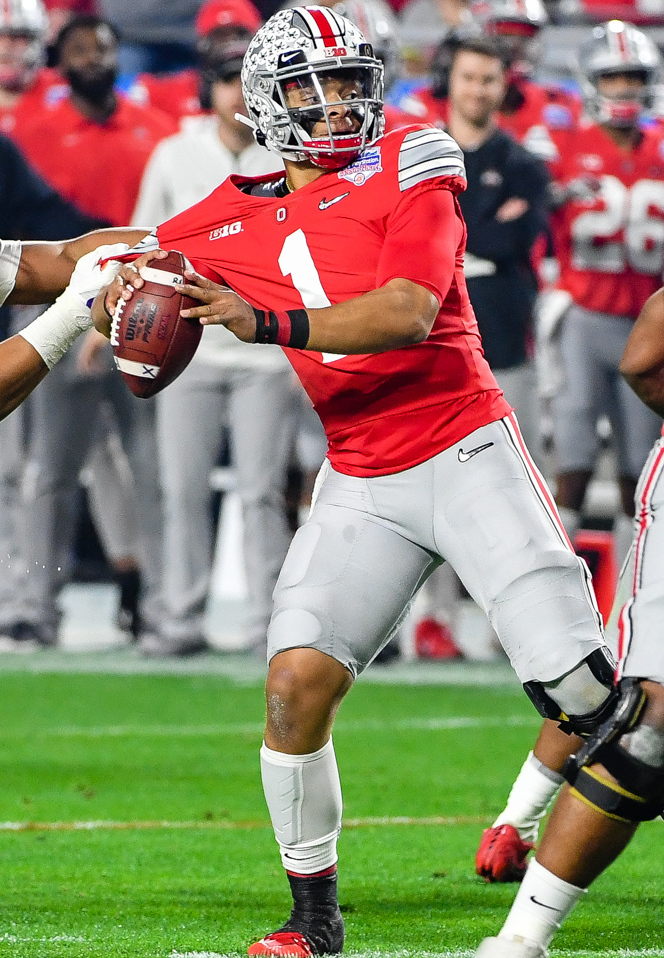
Justin Fields attempting a pass in the second quarter.

== Statistics ==
Statistics	CLEM	OSU
First downs	21	28
Plays–yards	62–417	85–516
Rushes–yards	29–158	39–196
Passing yards	259	320
Passing: comp–att–int	18–33–0	30–46–2
Turnovers		
Time of possession	26:33	33:27

Team	Category	Player	Statistics
Clemson	Passing	Trevor Lawrence	18/33, 259 yards, 2 TD
Clemson	Rushing	Trevor Lawrence	16 carries, 107 yards, 1 TD
Clemson	Receiving	Travis Etienne	3 receptions, 98 yards, 2 TD
Ohio State	Passing	Justin Fields	30/46, 320 yards, 1 TD, 2 INT
Ohio State	Rushing	J. K. Dobbins	18 carries, 174 yards, 1 TD
Ohio State	Receiving	K. J. Hill	6 receptions, 67 yards
