= 2020 College Football Playoff National Championship =

College football championship game

2020 College Football Playoff National Championship presented by AT&T
- 6th College Football Playoff National Championship
Clemson Tigers	LSU Tigers
(14–0)	(14–0)
ACC	SEC
25	42
Head coach: Dabo Swinney	Head coach: Ed Orgeron
AP / Coaches / CFP; 3 / 3 / 3	AP / Coaches / CFP; 1 / 1 / 1
	1	2	3	4	Total
Clemson	7	10	8	0	25
LSU	7	21	7	7	42
- Date: January 13, 2020
- Season: 2019
- Stadium: Mercedes-Benz Superdome
- Location: New Orleans, Louisiana
- MVP: Joe Burrow (LSU, QB); Patrick Queen (LSU, LB)
- Favorite: LSU by 4½
- National anthem: Lauren Daigle
- Referee: Chris Coyte (Pac-12)
- Halftime show: Clemson University Tiger Band; Louisiana State University Tiger Marching Band
- Attendance: 76,885

United States TV coverage
- Network: ESPN and ESPN Radio
- Announcers: ESPN: Chris Fowler (play-by-play); Kirk Herbstreit (analyst); Maria Taylor and Tom Rinaldi (sidelines); Adam Amin, Dan Orlovsky, Pat McAfee, Steve Levy (Field Pass); ESPN Radio: Sean McDonough, Todd Blackledge, Holly Rowe and Ian Fitzsimmons
- Nielsen ratings: 14.3 (25.59 million viewers)

International TV coverage
- Network: ESPN Deportes; ESPN Brasil
- Announcers: ESPN Brazil: Rômulo Mendonça (play-by-play) and Weinny Eirado (analyst)

The 2020 College Football Playoff National Championship was a college football bowl game played on January 13, 2020 (which was the latest calendar date for the game until 2025), at the Mercedes-Benz Superdome in New Orleans, Louisiana. The sixth College Football Playoff National Championship, the game determined a national champion in the NCAA Division I Football Bowl Subdivision for the 2019 season. The game began at 8:00 p.m. EST (7:00 p.m. local CST) and was televised by ESPN. It was the final game of the 2019–20 College Football Playoff and, aside from the all-star games that followed, was the culminating game of the 2019–20 bowl season. Sponsored by telecommunications company AT&T, the game was officially known as the 2020 College Football Playoff National Championship presented by AT&T.

The championship featured the winner of the Peach Bowl, the top-seeded LSU Tigers from the Southeastern Conference defeating the winner of the Fiesta Bowl, the third seed and defending national champion Clemson Tigers from the Atlantic Coast Conference by a score of 42–25 to win their first national championship since 2007. The win for LSU snapped Clemson's 29 game-winning streak and gave them their fourth national championship, their first in the College Football Playoff era, and becoming just the 2nd team to complete a perfect 15–0 season after Clemson doing the feat the season earlier. The next two teams that would accomplish this feat were Georgia in 2022, and Michigan in 2023. Clemson appeared in their fourth overall CFP National Championship game, tying them with Alabama for the most appearances by any team. LSU became the first team to win the national championship in their home state since the 2008 Florida Gators.

== Background ==
Mercedes-Benz Superdome in New Orleans was announced as the host site for the sixth College Football Playoff National Championship on November 4, 2015. Playoff seedings and New Year's Six bowl matchups were announced on December 8, 2019. This was the first of four consecutive College Football Playoff National Championship games matching the No. 3 seed and the No. 1 seed.

== Teams ==
The game matched the LSU Tigers of the Southeastern Conference (SEC) and the Clemson Tigers of the Atlantic Coast Conference (ACC). With both teams entering the game with 14–0 records, the winning team's 15–0 record would equal that of the 2018 Clemson Tigers, becoming only the second team (Note: At the FBS, Division I-A, or their predecessors level of college football.) to finish 15–0 in a single season since the 1897 Penn Quakers.

=== LSU Tigers ===
LSU defeated Georgia in the SEC Championship Game on December 7, and received a bid to the Peach Bowl with the release of final CFP rankings on December 8. The Tigers defeated Oklahoma, 63–28, in the CFP semifinal Peach Bowl on December 28, which was LSU's first CFP semifinal appearance. The Tigers entered the championship game with a 14–0 record (8–0 in conference). LSU's most recent loss was to Texas A&M on November 24, 2018; a seven overtime contest. This was LSU's first appearance in a CFP National Championship game; their most recent national championship game appearance had been a loss to Alabama in the 2012 BCS National Championship Game.

=== Clemson Tigers ===
Clemson defeated Virginia in the ACC Championship Game on December 7, and received a bid to the Fiesta Bowl with the release of final CFP rankings on December 8. On December 28, the Tigers defeated Ohio State in the CFP semifinal Fiesta Bowl, 29–23. Clemson also entered the championship game with a 14–0 record (8–0 in conference). The Tigers' most recent loss had been to Alabama in the CFP semifinal Sugar Bowl on January 1, 2018; their 29 consecutive victories following that loss constituted one of the longest NCAA Division I football winning streaks of all time. Including national championship contests, this was Clemson's ninth overall CFP game, and they had a 6–2 record in prior CFP games. The Tigers were the defending champions, having defeated Alabama in the 2019 CFP National Championship.

== Starting lineups ==
Both teams played a single set back offense as their primary offensive set. On defense, Clemson played out of the 4–3 defense, while LSU played a 3–4 defense.

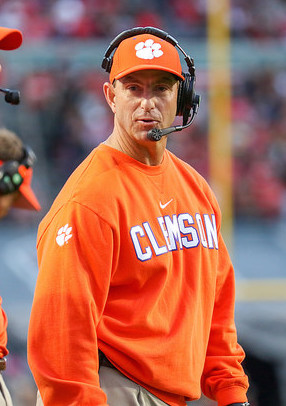
Clemson head coach Dabo Swinney

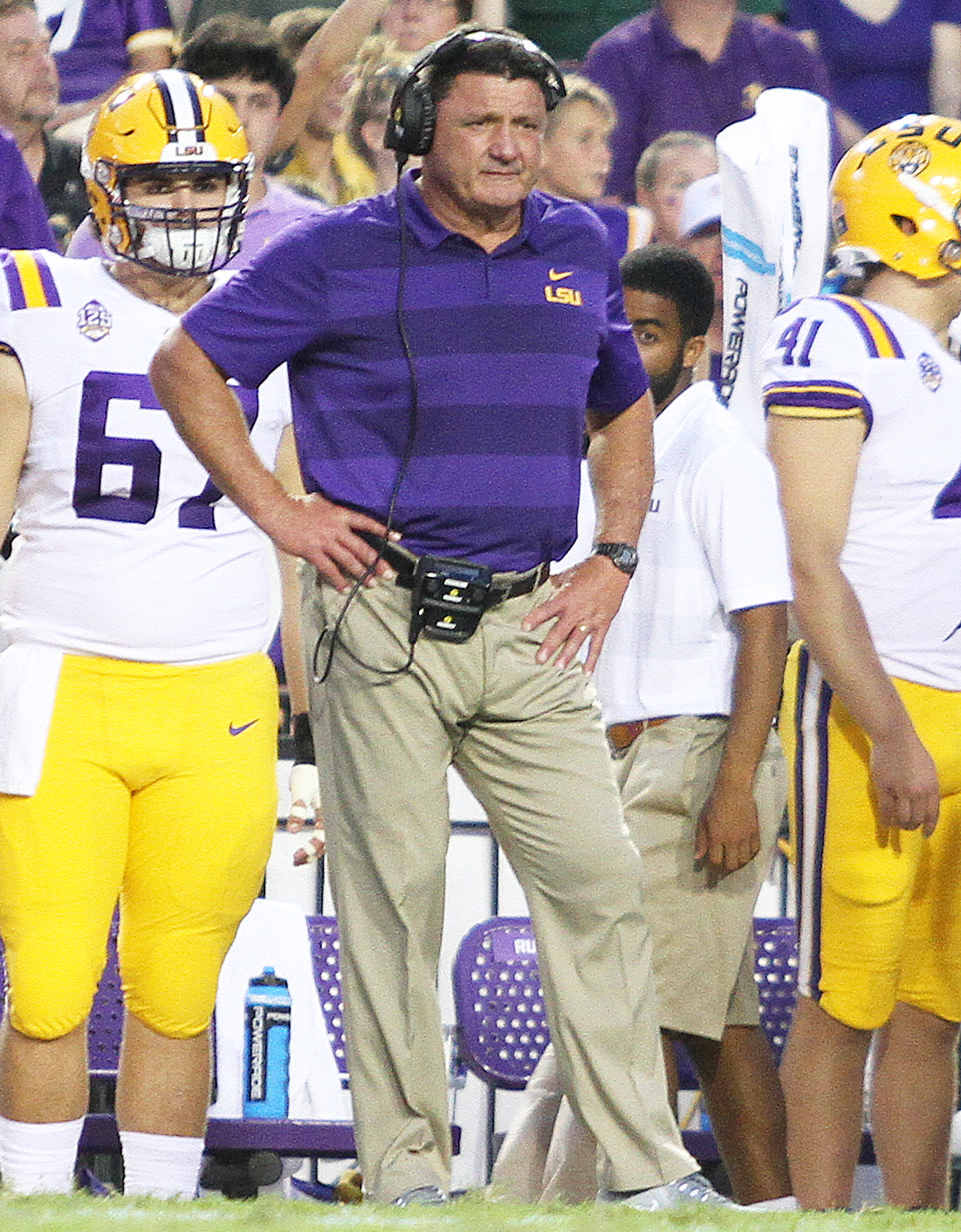
LSU head coach Ed Orgeron

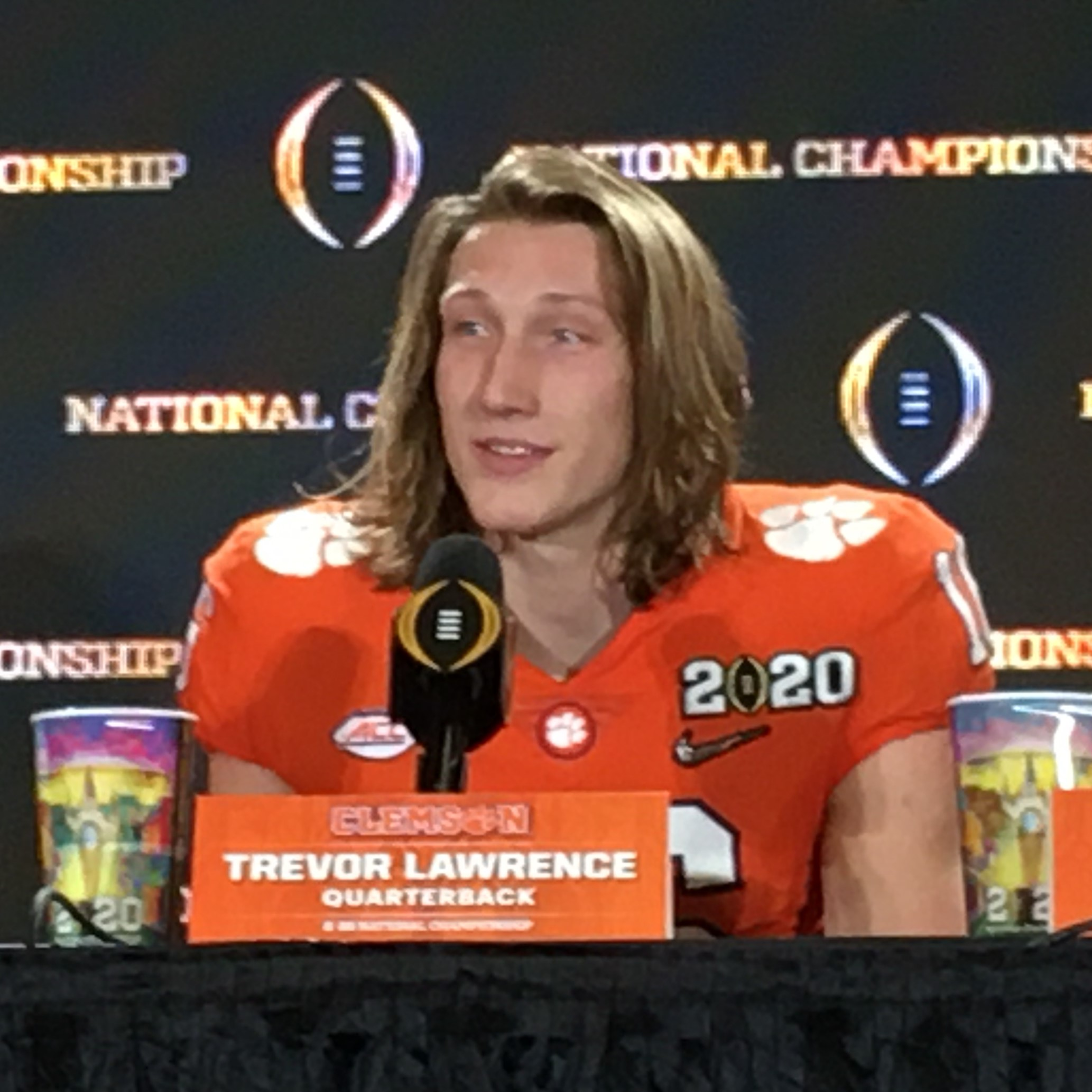
Clemson quarterback Trevor Lawrence

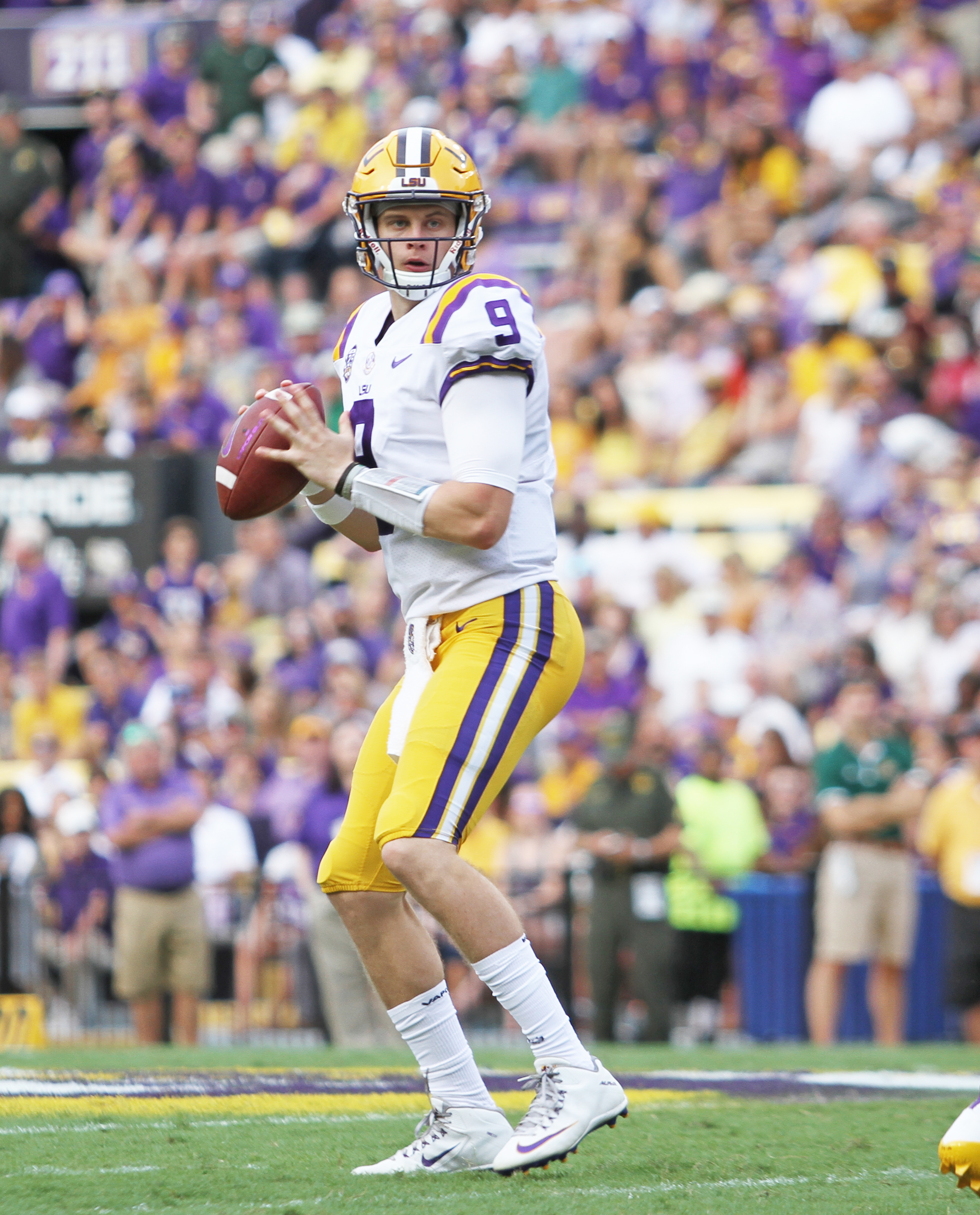
LSU quarterback Joe Burrow

Clemson	Position		LSU
Offense
Tee Higgins 2	WR		Justin Jefferson 1
Justyn Ross	WR		† Ja'Marr Chase 1
Jackson Carman 2	LT		Saahdiq Charles 4
† John Simpson 4	LG		Adrian Magee
Sean Pollard	C		Lloyd Cushenberry III 3
Gage Cervenka	RG		Damien Lewis 3
Tremayne Anchrum 7	RT		Austin Deculus 6
J. C. Chalk	TE		Thaddeus Moss
Amari Rodgers 3	WR		Terrace Marshall Jr. 2
Trevor Lawrence 1	QB		† Joe Burrow 1
Travis Etienne 1	RB		Clyde Edwards-Helaire 1
Defense
Logan Rudolph	DE		Glen Logan
Tyler Davis 6	DT	NT	Tyler Shelvin 4
Nyles Pinkney	DT	DE	Rashard Lawrence 4
Xavier Thomas 5	DE	OLB	Damone Clark 5
† Isaiah Simmons 1	SLB	LB	Jacob Phillips 3
James Skalski	MLB		Patrick Queen 1
Chad Smith	WLB	OLB	K'Lavon Chaisson 1
Derion Kendrick 6	CB		Kristian Fulton 2
A. J. Terrell 1	CB		† Derek Stingley Jr. 1
Tanner Muse 3	FS	S	Jacoby Stevens 6
K'Von Wallace 4	SS	S	† Grant Delpit 2
† 2019 All-American
Selected in an NFL Draft (number corresponds to draft round)

== Game summary ==
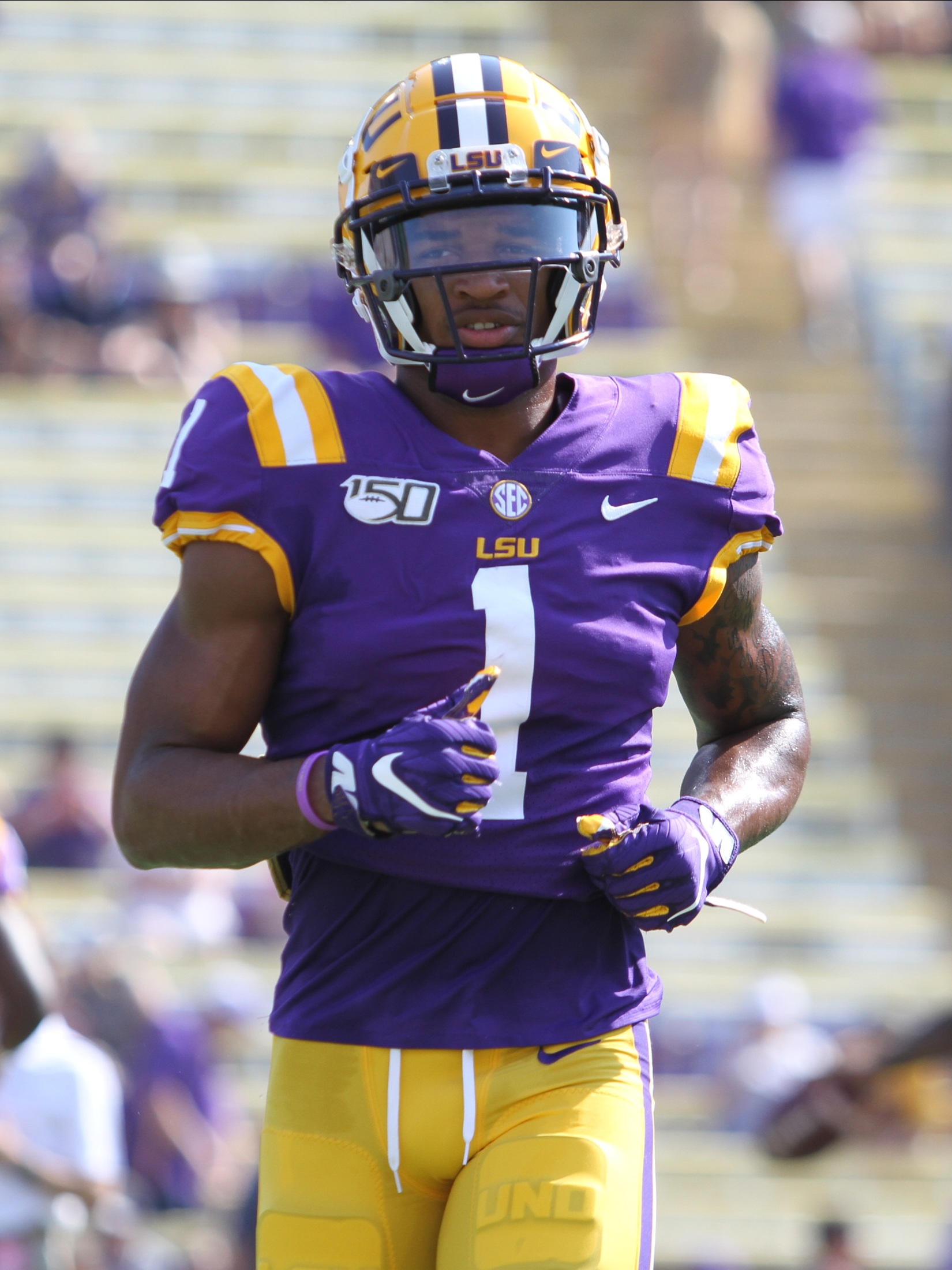
LSU wide receiver Ja'Marr Chase

=== First half ===
LSU won the coin toss, and deferred possession to the second half, giving Clemson the opening kickoff. After a promising start to their opening drive, Clemson was forced to punt on 4th-and-23, giving LSU the ball on their own 7-yard-line. LSU's opening drive was far less productive, as they punted after three plays totaling a net loss of four yards. Clemson opened their ensuing drive on the LSU 45. A three-and-out followed, but the Clemson punt coverage team again came up big, downing the ball at the 4-yard-line. While the next LSU drive resulted in positive yards, a punt was the result, and Clemson took over at their own 33 and scored in five plays, opening the scoring with a Trevor Lawrence rushing touchdown 8:26 into the game. LSU opened their next drive with a touchback, and recorded a first down for the first time, but again punted, giving Clemson the ball at their own 25; Clemson punted right back, and LSU took over at their own 29. On this drive, the LSU offense moved the ball seventy yards in just 4 plays, capped by a long Joe Burrow pass to wide receiver Ja'Marr Chase, tying the game at seven with 2:20 remaining in the opening quarter. Clemson had possession for the remainder of the quarter, and made it to the LSU 42 before time expired.

Clemson ran three additional plays in the second quarter before settling for a 52-yard field goal, converted by placekicker B.T. Potter, giving them a 10–7 edge. Following LSU's fourth punt of the evening, Clemson started with their worst field position yet, as they got the ball at their own 4. This did not deter the Clemson offense, as they covered the ninety-six yards ahead of them in only four plays, capping the touchdown drive with a long run by Tee Higgins; this extended Clemson's lead to ten. LSU responded with a quick drive of their own, scoring in five plays to narrow the lead to three on a touchdown run by Burrow. Clemson's next drive ended in a punt, and LSU capitalized with another long touchdown drive to take their first lead of the contest, by four, with just over five minutes until halftime on another touchdown pass to Chase. Clemson was unable to respond on offense; they punted and LSU got the ball on their own 5-yard-line. Joe Burrow and the LSU offense continued to build their momentum with their third consecutive touchdown drive of 75-plus yards to increase the lead to 11, 28–17, on a pass to Thaddeus Moss, heading into halftime.

=== Second half ===
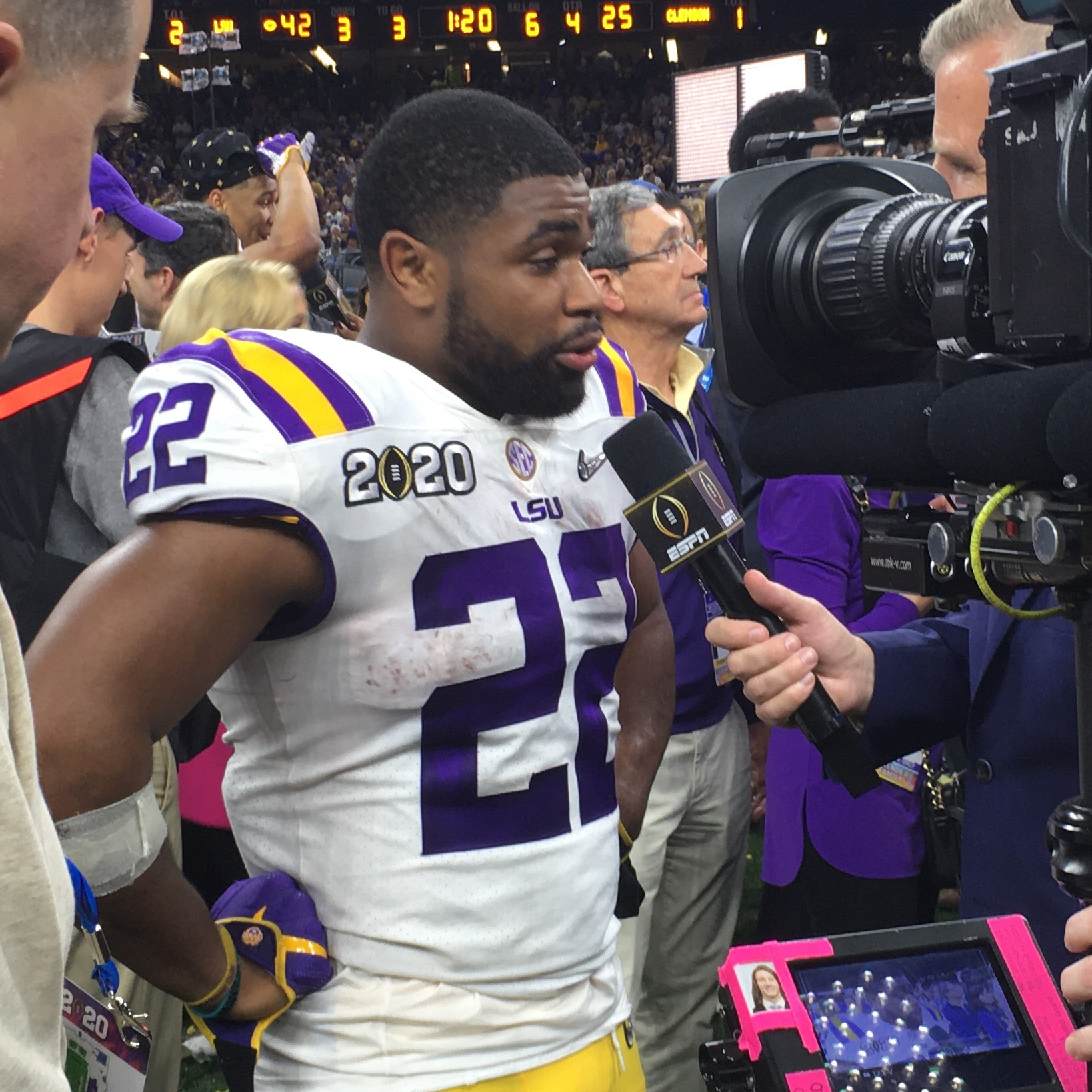
LSU running back Clyde Edwards-Helaire gives a post-game interview.

LSU opened the second half by receiving the kickoff; their ensuing drive resulted in a three-and-out, and Clemson took over on the 50-yard-line. For the first time in nearly an entire quarter, the Clemson offense found the end zone, as Travis Etienne capped a 6 play drive with his first touchdown of the day. Trevor Lawrence completed a pass to Amari Rodgers for the two-point conversion, cutting the LSU lead to three points. Joe Burrow's offense was again unable to produce on offense, and the second half (as did the first half) began with two three-and-outs for LSU. Clemson's next drive finished similarly, as a punt followed four plays totaling 14 yards. LSU took over on their own 32. On the fifth play of LSU's ensuing drive, Clemson starting middle linebacker James Skalski was ejected from the game for a targeting penalty; LSU scored on the next play on a touchdown pass from Burrow to Moss (one that gave Burrow sole possession of the FBS record for touchdown passes in a season with 59) to increase their lead to ten. Clemson couldn't produce on their next drive, and punted for the seventh time; LSU got the ball on their own 32. They drove to the Clemson 27 before attempting a 45-yard field goal, which Cade York missed wide right. Lawrence and the Clemson offense were unable to capitalize on the mistake, however; they went three-and-out and punted to the LSU 43. The quarter expired several plays later; LSU entered the fourth quarter leading 35–25.

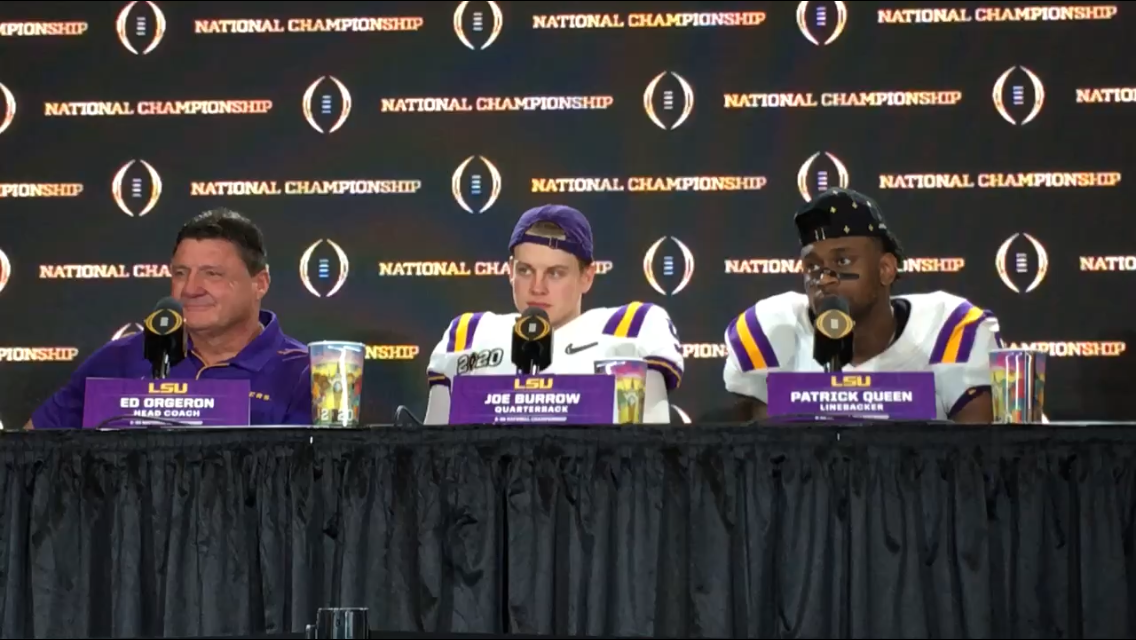
Orgeron along with Offensive MVP Joe Burrow and Defensive MVP Patrick Queen at the post-game presser.

LSU came out firing in the fourth quarter; they scored for just the second time this half on a Joe Burrow pass to Terrace Marshall Jr., his first receiving touchdown of the contest. For the fourth drive in a row, Clemson punted; the ball was downed at the LSU 10. After taking 5:24 off the clock, LSU punted the ball back, and Clemson took over with just under five minutes left, on their own 15. However, three plays later, Trevor Lawrence fumbled at the end of his rush; it was recovered by LSU's Derek Stingley Jr. with 3:53 to go. LSU was able to run the remaining time off the clock and finish the season as undefeated national champions, becoming the second 15–0 team in the modern era.

=== Scoring summary ===
2020 College Football Playoff National Championship

Quarter	1	2	3	4	Total
No. 3 Clemson	7	10	8	0	25
No. 1 LSU	7	21	7	7	42

at Mercedes-Benz Superdome • New Orleans, Louisiana

- Date: January 13, 2020
- Game time: 7:00 p.m. CST
- Game weather: n/a (game played indoors)
- Game attendance: 76,885
- Referee: Chris Coyte (Pac-12)
- TV announcers (ESPN): Chris Fowler (play-by-play), Kirk Herbstreit (color), Maria Taylor and Tom Rinaldi (sideline)
- ESPN game summary

Game information

First Quarter

- (6:34) CLEM – Trevor Lawrence 1 yard rush, B.T. Potter kick (Drive: 5 plays, 67 yards, 2:05; Clemson 7–0)
- (2:20) LSU – Joe Burrow 52 yard pass to Ja'Marr Chase, Cade York kick (Drive: 4 plays, 70 yards, 1:36; Tied 7–7)

Second Quarter

- (13:43) CLEM – B.T. Potter 52 yard field goal (Drive: 9 plays, 40 yards, 3:37; Clemson 10–7)
- (10:38) CLEM – Tee Higgins 36 yard rush, B.T. Potter kick (Drive: 4 plays, 96 yards, 1:32; Clemson 17–7)
- (9:17) LSU – Joe Burrow 3 yard rush, Cade York kick (Drive: 5 plays, 75 yards, 1:21; Clemson 17–14)
- (5:19) LSU – Joe Burrow 14 yard pass to Ja'Marr Chase, Cade York kick (Drive: 6 plays, 87 yards, 2:03; LSU 21–17)
- (0:10) LSU – Joe Burrow 6 yard pass to Thaddeus Moss, Cade York kick (Drive: 11 plays, 95 yards, 3:28; LSU 28–17)

Third Quarter

- (10:49) CLEM – Travis Etienne 3 yard rush, 2-point pass good (Drive: 6 plays, 50 yards, 2:37; LSU 28–25)
- (5:13) LSU – Joe Burrow 4 yard pass to Thaddeus Moss, Cade York kick (Drive: 6 plays, 68 yards, 2:26; LSU 35–25)

Fourth Quarter

- (12:08) LSU – Joe Burrow 24 yard pass to Terrace Marshall Jr., Cade York kick (Drive: 8 plays, 57 yards, 3:42; LSU 42–25)

=== Statistics ===
Statistics	CLEM	LSU
First downs	23	29
Plays–yards	65–394	81–628
Rushes–yards	28–160	32–165
Passing yards	234	463
Passing: comp–att–int	18–37–0	31–49–0
Time of possession	25:15	34:45

Team	Category	Player	Statistics
Clemson	Passing	Trevor Lawrence	18/37, 234 yards
Clemson	Rushing	Travis Etienne	15 carries, 78 yards, 1 TD
Clemson	Receiving	Justyn Ross	5 receptions, 76 yards
LSU	Passing	Joe Burrow	31/49, 463 yards, 5 TD
LSU	Rushing	Clyde Edwards-Helaire	16 carries, 110 yards
LSU	Receiving	Ja'Marr Chase	9 receptions, 221 yards, 2 TD

== Broadcasting ==
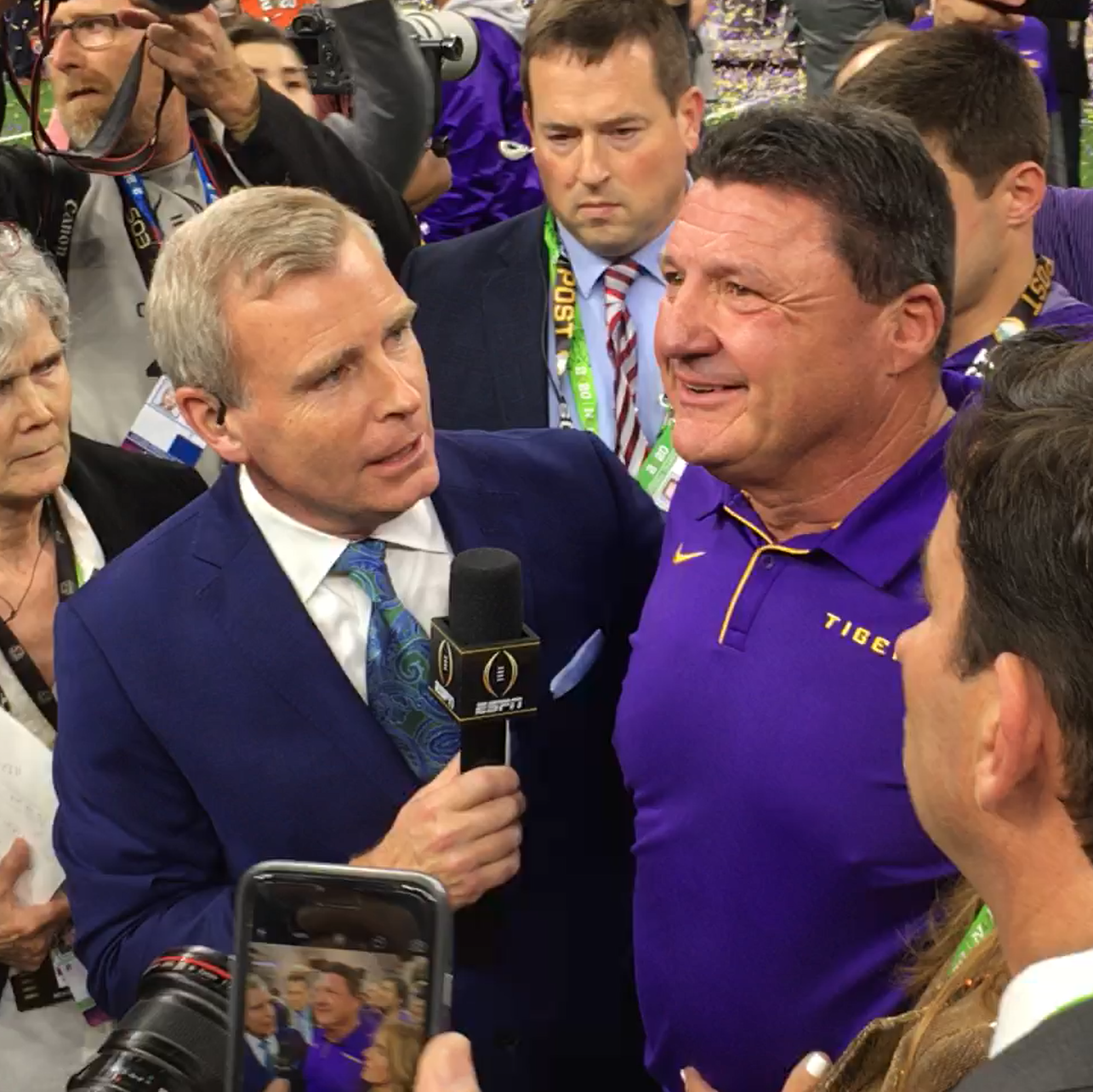
Rinaldi interviews Orgeron on the field immediately after the game.

The game was televised nationally by ESPN and called on ESPN Radio. For the sixth consecutive national championship, ESPN offered its Megacast coverage.

- ESPN: Chris Fowler (play-by-play), Kirk Herbstreit (analyst), Maria Taylor (Clemson sideline), Tom Rinaldi (LSU sideline), Bill Lemonnier (rules analyst)
- ESPN Radio: Sean McDonough (play-by-play), Todd Blackledge (analyst), Holly Rowe (LSU sideline), Ian Fitzsimmons (Clemson sideline); also available as Command Center audio.
- ESPN2: Field Pass, Adam Amin and Steve Levy roam the sidelines with various guests, including ESPN analysts Pat McAfee and Dan Orlovsky.
- ESPNU: Coaches Film Room, featuring discussion of the game with Vanderbilt coach Derek Mason, Oklahoma State coach Mike Gundy, TCU coach Gary Patterson, and former Ohio State defensive coordinator and new Boston College head coach Jeff Hafley.
- ESPNews: Command Center, multiple camera views, which includes four different view points at one time with statistics and real-time drive charts, with audio from ESPN Radio broadcast.
- ESPN Goal Line: DataCenter ESPN's main telecast surrounded by real-time statistics, analytics, social media commentary and player information; officially the network's last program, as the network was discontinued on June 30, 2020.
- ACC Network: Hometown Radio Video overlaid with the radio call from the Clemson Tigers Sports Network; Don Munson (play-by-play), Tim Bourret (color commentary), Brad Scott (color), Reggie Merriweather (Clemson sideline).
- SEC Network: Hometown Radio Video overlaid with the radio call from the LSU Sports Network; Chris Blair (play-by-play), Doug Moreau (analyst), Gordy Rush (LSU sideline).
- ESPN Classic: Sounds of the Game features natural audio from the stadium, also includes band halftime performances. Not available as widely as most years due to several provider drops throughout 2019 as part of ESPN's purposeful wind-down of the network; a simulcast was offered on ESPN3.

== See also ==
- College football national championships in NCAA Division I FBS
