= Football Power Index =

ESPN predictive rating system

Football Power Index (abbreviated as FPI) is a predictive rating system developed by ESPN that measures team strength and uses it to forecast game and season results in American football. Each team's FPI rating is composed of predictive offensive, defensive, and special teams value, as measured by a function of expected points added (EPA). That rating is the basis for FPI's game-level and season-level projections.

== Characteristics ==
Like most game predictions, FPI accounts for team strength, opponent strength, and home-field advantage. There are a number of unique inputs into each game prediction, such as the following:

- On-field performance in previous games: measured by adjusted expected points added by unit
- Rest: Extra days of rest has shown to make a difference, particularly when facing a team coming off short rest.
- Distance traveled: Extreme cases of long travel (e.g. Seattle to Miami) is worth about a half point per game, with all other factors equal.

These factors are combined to create a single-game prediction, but other factors are included based upon the type of league (college football vs the NFL). Each team's season is simulated 10,000 times to produce its chance to win its division, win its conference, make the playoffs, win the Super Bowl (NFL), pick any slot in the NFL draft, and more.

In 2016, FPI favorites won 73 percent of games in the regular season, which was a higher success rate than the Las Vegas closing lines.

== Computation ==
FPI's rating is based on the average number of points by which team would beat an average NFL (or college) team on a neutral field. The model uses a Bayesian framework, using priors around the EPA rate of each team unit, derived from preseason expectations. The only single position that impacts FPI is the quarterback position (only NFL), as predictive QBR is added.

EPA is the foundation for FPI. Each game play has an adjusted EPA based on historical data. EPA breaks down points added in every way, thus having different factors for the team's offense, defense, and special teams units. Generally, the offense and defense factors are independent.

== NFL FPI vs College Football FPI ==
FPI is applied to football both at the NFL level and at the college level, but their models are slightly different.

In college football, each team unit has its own prior. Four of the main inputs for each prior includes data on the last 4 seasons (with an emphasis on the previous season), the number of returning starters on the offense and defense (with the QB counting as more), a binary input on the returning coach, and the strength of the team's recruiting class (with an input for transfers). College FPI is more reliant on the priors in the model due to the regular occurrences of mismatches each week. The priors are based on the adjusted EPA so that no team dominates.

The altitude of the game, seasonal effects, and any quarterback injury/suspension/absence is taken into account with NFL FPI. These effects were not significant for college football. More games are played in higher altitude in the NFL (most notably in Denver, Colorado), the NFL season goes longer into winter, and there is a stronger effect on who the quarterback is at the professional level. The quarterback factor is adjusted for the probability that the quarterback will start, injuries, rookies, and trades.

== Comments and criticisms ==
FPI, along with other metrics from ESPN, have been criticized for its inaccuracy, relying more on probabilities and less on in-game action. For example, in the 2015-2016 college football playoff, FPI listed the Oklahoma Sooners as the team with the highest chance to win the playoff at 39%, while the Clemson Tigers were listed at third highest at 17%. Clemson would go on and beat Oklahoma in the first round, but eventually lose to Alabama in the national championship game. Alabama was listed second with a 33% chance to win the playoff. In addition, there is criticism of the week-by-week changes that FPI makes, rather than making one prediction for each team.

College FPI was heavily criticized after week 2 of the 2017-18 college football season when the Ohio State Buckeyes were listed number one after losing big at home to the Oklahoma Sooners (Oklahoma was 2nd in FPI). Oklahoma would pass Ohio State for the top spot after week 3.

The FPI was again heavily criticized after week 13 of the 2023-24 college football season when Ohio State was ranked number one in FPI after losing to the undefeated Michigan Wolverines, who were ranked second.

== See also ==
- Total quarterback rating
