= Thaddeus Moss =

American gridiron football player (born 1998)

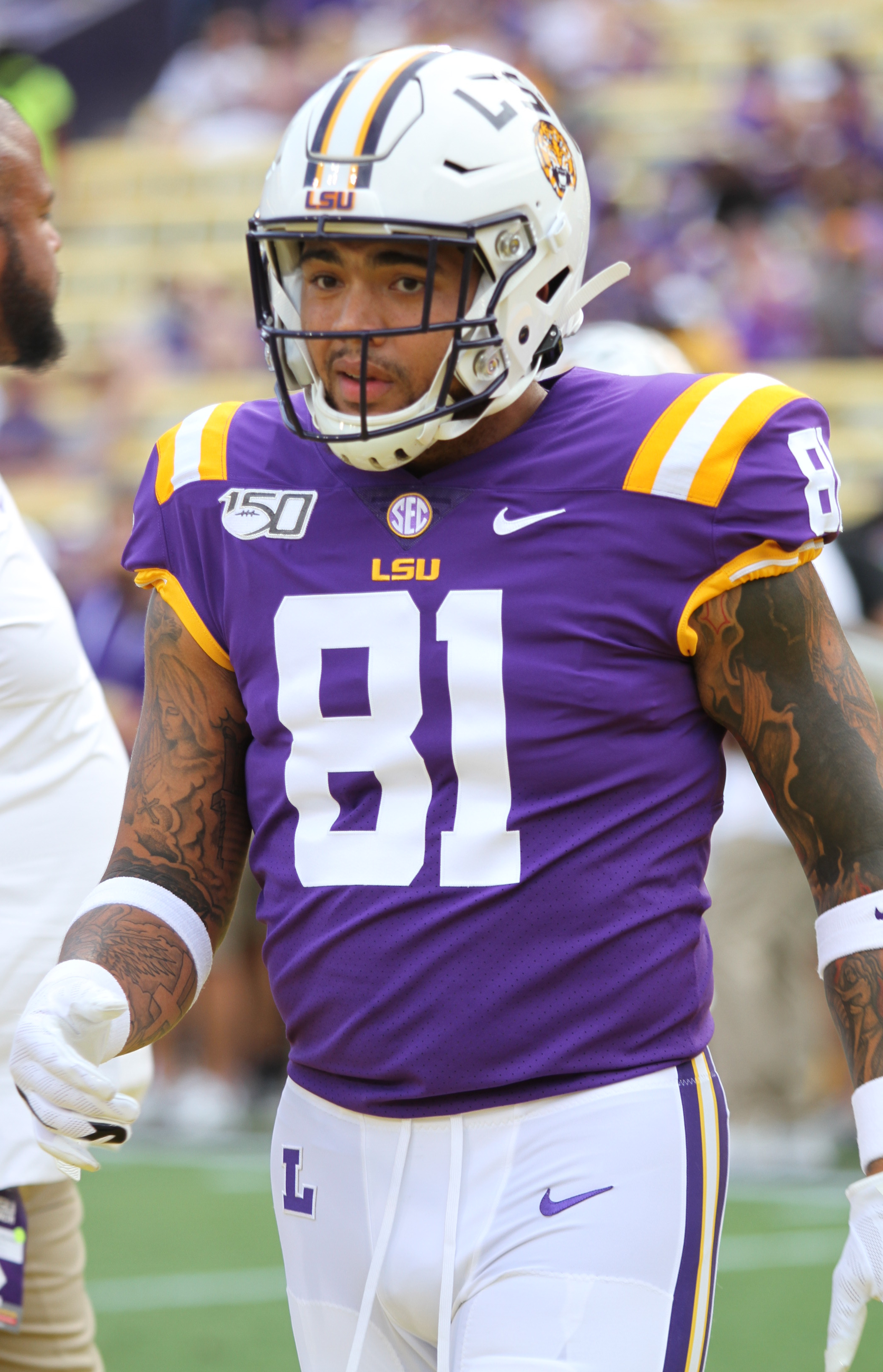
- Moss with the LSU Tigers in 2019

No. 81
- Position: Tight end

Personal information
- Born: May 14, 1998 (age 28); Florence, Kentucky, U.S.
- Listed height: 6 ft 2 in (1.88 m)
- Listed weight: 235 lb (107 kg)

Career information
- High school: Mallard Creek (Charlotte, North Carolina)
- College: NC State (2016); LSU (2017–2019)
- NFL draft: 2020: undrafted

Career history
- Washington Football Team (2020)*; Cincinnati Bengals (2021); Birmingham Stallions (2023); Hamilton Tiger-Cats (2024)*
- * Offseason or practice squad member only

Awards and highlights
- USFL champion (2023); CFP national champion (2019)
- Stats at Pro Football Reference
- Stats at CFL.ca

Thaddeus Waylan Moss (born May 14, 1998) is an American former professional football tight end. He played college football for the NC State Wolfpack and the LSU Tigers, becoming a CFP national champion with the latter program.

Following the 2020 NFL draft, Moss signed as an undrafted free agent with the Washington Football Team of the National Football League (NFL), but did not play with them due to injury and was released the following offseason. He was also a member of the Cincinnati Bengals and played for the Birmingham Stallions of the United States Football League (USFL). Moss then had a short stint with the Hamilton Tiger-Cats of the Canadian Football League (CFL), before retiring in May 2024.

He is the son of Pro Football Hall of Fame wide receiver Randy Moss.

== Early life ==
Moss initially attended Boone County High School in Florence, Kentucky, where he caught 12 passes for 157 yards on offense and had 32 tackles on defense. He then transferred to St. Albans School in St. Albans, West Virginia midway through his freshman year. He attended Lincoln High School in Rhode Island for his sophomore year before moving to Charlotte, North Carolina as a junior. He attended Victory Christian Center as a junior and transferred to Mallard Creek High School for his senior year. As a senior, Moss caught 54 passes for 831 yards and 13 touchdowns, with Mallard Creek also winning the 2015 North Carolina 4AA state championship. Moss committed to play college football at NC State over offers from Alabama, Florida, Georgia, Michigan, and Texas A&M.

== College career ==
Moss began his collegiate career at NC State. As a true freshman, he caught six passes for 49 yards and a touchdown. Moss announced his intent to transfer during the summer after his freshman year and chose LSU. He missed the entire 2017 season due to NCAA transfer rules. He also missed the entire 2018 season due to a foot injury and was granted a medical redshirt.

As a redshirt junior, Moss finished the season with 47 receptions for 570 receiving yards, both school records for tight ends, and four touchdowns. Moss caught four passes for 99 yards and scored a touchdown on a 62-yard reception against Oklahoma in the 2019 Peach Bowl. In the 2020 National Championship Game, he scored two touchdowns on five receptions for 36 yards. His two scores allowed quarterback and 2019 Heisman Trophy winner Joe Burrow to tie and break the NCAA single season record for touchdown passes. On January 17, 2020, Moss announced that he would forgo his senior year by declaring for the 2020 NFL draft.

=== Statistics ===
Season	Team	Class	Receiving			
Season	Team	Class	Rec	Yds	Avg	TD
2016	NC State	FR	6	49	8.2	1
2019	LSU	JR	47	570	12.1	4
Career			53	619	11.7	5

== Professional career ==
Pre-draft measurables
Height	Weight	Arm length	Hand span	Wingspan
6 ft 1 7/8 in (1.88 m)	250 lb (113 kg)	31 7/8 in (0.81 m)	9 7/8 in (0.25 m)	6 ft 6 1/4 in (1.99 m)
All values from NFL Combine

=== Washington Football Team ===
Moss signed with the Washington Football Team as an undrafted free agent following the 2020 NFL draft, choosing them over the New England Patriots and Cincinnati Bengals. He was waived with an injury designation on August 21, 2020, and reverted to the team's injured reserve list the following day. Moss was waived on April 9, 2021.

=== Cincinnati Bengals ===
Moss was claimed off waivers by the Cincinnati Bengals on April 12, 2021. This move reunited Moss with his former LSU teammates Joe Burrow and Ja'Marr Chase. He was waived on August 31, 2021. He signed with their practice squad the following day. Moss was elevated to the active roster on November 27, 2021, ahead of the Bengals' home game against the 5–4–1 Pittsburgh Steelers. However, Moss did not play in that game because of a hamstring injury he suffered in pregame warmups.

On February 15, 2022, Moss signed a reserve/future contract. He was waived on August 30, 2022, and signed to the practice squad the next day. He was waived from the practice squad on September 5, 2022.

=== Birmingham Stallions ===
On April 10, 2023, Moss signed with the Birmingham Stallions of the United States Football League (USFL). He was released on December 3, 2023, and re-signed on December 26. He was not part of the roster after the 2024 UFL dispersal draft on January 15, 2024.

=== Hamilton Tiger-Cats ===
On February 22, 2024, Moss signed with the Hamilton Tiger-Cats of the Canadian Football League (CFL). On May 10, he was cut in the first round of training camp cuts.

On May 13, 2024, Moss announced his retirement from professional football.

== Career statistics ==
=== USFL ===
Regular season statistics
Year	Team	Games		Receiving					Rushing					Fumbles	
Year	Team	GP	GS	Rec	Yds	Avg	Lng	TD	Att	Yds	Avg	Lng	TD	Fum	Lost
2023	BIR	8	3	3	38	12.67	21	1	–	–	–	–	–	–	–
Career		8	3	3	38	12.67	21	1	–	–	–	–	–	–	–

== Personal life ==
He is the son of Pro Football Hall of Fame wide receiver Randy Moss.
