= Nolan Turner =

American football player (born 1997)

Clemson Tigers
- Title: Safeties coach

Personal information
- Born: November 29, 1997 (age 28); Birmingham, Alabama, U.S.
- Listed height: 6 ft 1 in (1.85 m)
- Listed weight: 202 lb (92 kg)

Career information
- High school: Vestavia Hills (Vestavia Hills, Alabama)
- College: Clemson (2016–2021)
- NFL draft: 2022: undrafted

Career history

Playing
- Tampa Bay Buccaneers (2022)

Coaching
- Clemson (2024–2025) Assistant safeties coach; Clemson (2026–present) Safeties coach

Awards and highlights
- CFP national champion (2018); Second-team AFCA All-American (2020); Second-team All-ACC (2020)

Career NFL statistics
- Total tackles: 1
- Stats at Pro Football Reference

Nolan Turner (born November 29, 1997) is an American former professional football safety and current coach. He played college football at Clemson.

== Early life ==
Turner grew up in Birmingham, Alabama and attended Vestavia Hills High School. As a senior, he made 63 tackles with five interceptions. Nick Saban visited shortly after Nolan's father passing to offer a guaranteed walk on spot. Turner initially intended to take the offer and play college football as a walk-on at Alabama, his father's alma mater, over offers from UAB and Troy. He later committed to play at Clemson after receiving a late full scholarship offer from head coach Dabo Swinney, a former college teammate and roommate of his father's, after two safeties decommitted from the school.

== College career ==
Turner played college football at Clemson for six seasons and redshirted his true freshman season. As a redshirt senior, he made 66 tackles with six tackles for loss and three interceptions and was named second-team All-Atlantic Coast Conference and a second-team All-American by the American Football Coaches Association (AFCA). Turner decided to utilize the extra year of eligibility granted to college athletes who played in the 2020 season due to the coronavirus pandemic and return to Clemson for a sixth season. He had 69 tackles with two tackles for loss, two sacks, three passes broken up, one interception, and a forced fumble in his final season.

== Professional career ==
Pre-draft measurables
Height	Weight	Arm length	Hand span	40-yard dash	10-yard split	20-yard split	20-yard shuttle	Three-cone drill	Vertical jump	Broad jump	Bench press
6 ft 0 7/8 in (1.85 m)	202 lb (92 kg)	31 1/4 in (0.79 m)	9 1/8 in (0.23 m)	4.42 s	1.63 s	2.59 s	4.46 s	7.06 s	37.5 in (0.95 m)	10 ft 2 in (3.10 m)	17 reps
All values from Pro Day

Turner signed with the Tampa Bay Buccaneers as an undrafted free agent on May 1, 2022. He was waived on August 30, 2022 and signed to the practice squad the next day. He was promoted to the active roster on October 27. He was waived on December 5, and re-signed to the practice squad. He signed a reserve/future contract on January 17, 2023. He was waived on August 28, 2023.

== Coaching career ==
Turner joined Clemson's coaching staff as a defensive analyst and assistant safeties coach in 2024. He was promoted to safeties coach in 2026.

== Personal life ==
Turner's late father, Kevin Turner, played fullback at Alabama and in the NFL for the New England Patriots and the Philadelphia Eagles. Kevin Turner died of amyotrophic lateral sclerosis (ALS), which had been triggered by chronic traumatic encephalopathy (CTE), during Nolan's senior year of high school. His younger brother, Cole Turner, plays wide receiver at Clemson.
