= 2019 Clemson Tigers football team =

American college football season

2019 Clemson Tigers football

ACC champion ACC Atlantic Division champion Fiesta Bowl champion

ACC Championship Game, W 62–17 vs. Virginia

Fiesta Bowl (CFP Semifinal), W 29–23 vs. Ohio State CFP National Championship, L 25–42 vs. LSU
- Conference: Atlantic Coast Conference
- Atlantic Division

Ranking
- Coaches: No. 2
- AP: No. 2
- Record: 14–1 (8–0 ACC)
- Head coach: Dabo Swinney (11th full, 12th overall season)
- Co-offensive coordinators: Tony Elliott (5th season); Jeff Scott (5th season)
- Offensive scheme: Spread
- Defensive coordinator: Brent Venables (8th season)
- Base defense: 4–3
- Home stadium: Memorial Stadium

Uniform
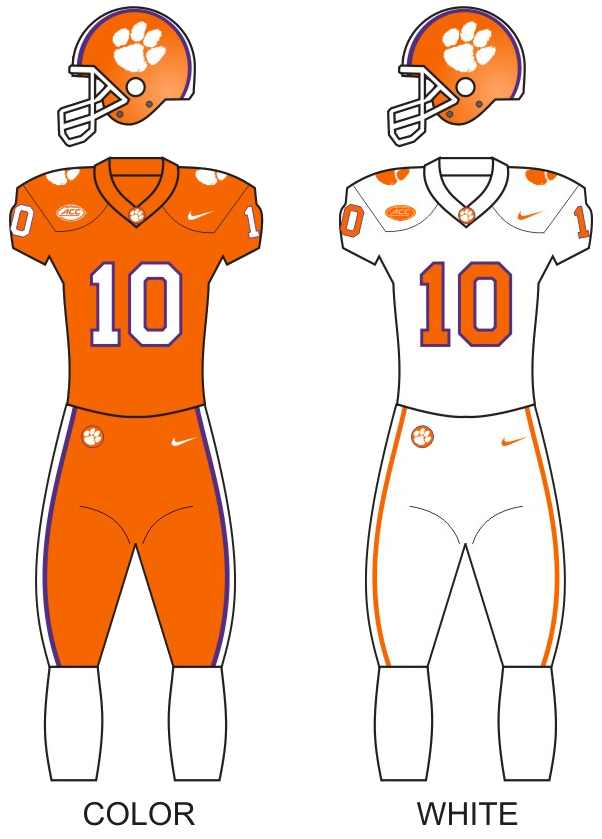

2019 Atlantic Coast Conference football standings
	Conf.			Overall
Team	W		L	W		L
Atlantic Division
No. 2 Clemson xy$^	8	–	0	14	–	1
Louisville	5	–	3	8	–	5
Wake Forest	4	–	4	8	–	5
Boston College	4	–	4	6	–	7
Florida State	4	–	4	6	–	7
Syracuse	2	–	6	5	–	7
NC State	1	–	7	4	–	8
Coastal Division
Virginia x	6	–	2	9	–	5
Virginia Tech	5	–	3	8	–	5
Pittsburgh	4	–	4	8	–	5
North Carolina	4	–	4	7	–	6
Miami (FL)	4	–	4	6	–	7
Duke	3	–	5	5	–	7
Georgia Tech	2	–	6	3	–	9
Championship: Clemson 62, Virginia 17
^ – College Football Playoff participant; $ – Conference champion; x – Division champion/co-champions; Rankings from AP Poll

The 2019 Clemson Tigers football team represented Clemson University during the 2019 NCAA Division I FBS football season. The Tigers were led by head coach Dabo Swinney, in his 11th full year. The Tigers competed as members of the Atlantic Coast Conference (ACC), and played their home games at Memorial Stadium in Clemson, South Carolina.

Entering the season as defending national champions, Clemson began the year ranked first in the polls. Despite securing another undefeated regular season and its fifth consecutive conference title after defeating Virginia in the ACC Championship Game, Clemson fell to third in the final College Football Playoff rankings of the season, owing to its comparatively weak strength of schedule. They were selected to the Fiesta Bowl to play second-seeded Ohio State, where the Tigers won by a score of 29–23. Clemson advanced to the National Championship Game, where they lost to LSU, 42–25, ending their winning streak at 29 games and finishing the season at 14–1.

Clemson was led by sophomore quarterback Trevor Lawrence, who led the ACC with 3,665 passing yards and 45 total touchdowns. Running back Travis Etienne was named ACC Player of the Year for the second consecutive year, leading the conference with 19 rushing touchdowns and 7.8 yards per carry, and finishing in second with 1,614 rushing yards. Offensive lineman John Simpson was named a consensus All-American, and he was joined on the first-team All-ACC by Lawrence, Etienne, wide receiver Tee Higgins, and offensive lineman Tremayne Anchrum. On defense, the team was led by All-American and ACC Defensive Player of the Year linebacker Isaiah Simmons. He was joined on the first-team All-ACC by cornerback A. J. Terrell and safety Tanner Muse.

== Offseason ==
=== Recruiting ===
Clemson's 2019 recruiting class consisted of 29 signees, including 17 that enrolled early and one that grayshirted. The class was ranked as the best class in the ACC and the 10th best class overall according to the 247Sports Composite.

College recruiting (2019)
Name	Hometown	School	Height	Weight	Commit date
Davis Allen; TE	Calhoun, GA	Calhoun High School	6 ft 4 in (1.93 m)	220 lb (100 kg)	Jun 6, 2018
Davis Allen; TE	Recruit ratings: Rivals: 247Sports: ESPN: (78)				
LaVonta Bentley; ILB	Birmingham, AL	Jackson-Olin High School	6 ft 1 in (1.85 m)	218 lb (99 kg)	Jul 27, 2018
LaVonta Bentley; ILB	Recruit ratings: Rivals: 247Sports: ESPN: (80)				
Kaleb Boateng; OG	Fort Lauderdale, FL	Fort Lauderdale High School	6 ft 4 in (1.93 m)	290 lb (130 kg)	Dec 19, 2018
Kaleb Boateng; OG	Recruit ratings: Rivals: 247Sports: ESPN: (75)				
Andrew Booth Jr. CB	Lawrenceville, GA	Archer High School	6 ft 0 in (1.83 m)	187 lb (85 kg)	Jul 30, 2018
Andrew Booth Jr. CB	Recruit ratings: Rivals: 247Sports: ESPN: (86)				
Logan Cash; DE	Winder, GA	Winder-Barrow High School	6 ft 3 in (1.91 m)	255 lb (116 kg)	Jun 21, 2018
Logan Cash; DE	Recruit ratings: Rivals: 247Sports: ESPN: (79)				
Joseph Charleston; S	Milton, GA	Milton High School	6 ft 1 in (1.85 m)	190 lb (86 kg)	Oct 10, 2017
Joseph Charleston; S	Recruit ratings: Rivals: 247Sports: ESPN: (82)				
Bryton Constantin; ILB	Baton Rouge, LA	University Laboratory School	6 ft 3 in (1.91 m)	207 lb (94 kg)	Apr 13, 2018
Bryton Constantin; ILB	Recruit ratings: Rivals: 247Sports: ESPN: (84)				
Tyler Davis; DT	Apopka, FL	Wekiva High School	6 ft 2 in (1.88 m)	293 lb (133 kg)	Dec 19, 2018
Tyler Davis; DT	Recruit ratings: Rivals: 247Sports: ESPN: (85)				
Michel Dukes; RB	Charleston, SC	First Baptist Church School	5 ft 10 in (1.78 m)	191 lb (87 kg)	Feb 2, 2019
Michel Dukes; RB	Recruit ratings: Rivals: 247Sports: ESPN: (77)				
Tayquon Johnson; DT	Williamsport, MD	Williamsport High School	6 ft 2 in (1.88 m)	293 lb (133 kg)	May 14, 2018
Tayquon Johnson; DT	Recruit ratings: Rivals: 247Sports: ESPN: (80)				
Sheridan Jones; CB	Norfolk, VA	Maury High School	6 ft 0 in (1.83 m)	167 lb (76 kg)	Apr 20, 2018
Sheridan Jones; CB	Recruit ratings: Rivals: 247Sports: ESPN: (84)				
Frank Ladson; WR	Homestead, FL	South Dade High School	6 ft 3 in (1.91 m)	178 lb (81 kg)	Apr 14, 2018
Frank Ladson; WR	Recruit ratings: Rivals: 247Sports: ESPN: (86)				
Jaelyn Lay; TE	Riverdale, GA	Riverdale High School	6 ft 6 in (1.98 m)	228 lb (103 kg)	Mar 3, 2018
Jaelyn Lay; TE	Recruit ratings: Rivals: 247Sports: ESPN: (86)				
Keith Maguire; OLB	Malvern, PA	Malvern Prep	6 ft 2 in (1.88 m)	210 lb (95 kg)	Apr 27, 2018
Keith Maguire; OLB	Recruit ratings: Rivals: 247Sports: ESPN: (76)				
Chez Mellusi; RB	Naples, FL	Naples High School	5 ft 11 in (1.80 m)	195 lb (88 kg)	Apr 16, 2018
Chez Mellusi; RB	Recruit ratings: Rivals: 247Sports: ESPN: (83)				
Joseph Ngata; WR	Folsom, CA	Folsom High School	6 ft 2 in (1.88 m)	200 lb (91 kg)	Jul 28, 2018
Joseph Ngata; WR	Recruit ratings: Rivals: 247Sports: ESPN: (83)				
Ruke Orhorhoro; DE	River Rouge, MI	River Rouge High School	6 ft 4 in (1.93 m)	255 lb (116 kg)	Jun 15, 2018
Ruke Orhorhoro; DE	Recruit ratings: Rivals: 247Sports: ESPN: (78)				
Kane Patterson; ILB	Nashville, TN	Christ Presbyterian Academy	6 ft 1 in (1.85 m)	220 lb (100 kg)	Sep 4, 2018
Kane Patterson; ILB	Recruit ratings: Rivals: 247Sports: ESPN: (81)				
Jalyn Phillips; S	Lawrenceville, GA	Archer High School	6 ft 0 in (1.83 m)	198 lb (90 kg)	Aug 20, 2018
Jalyn Phillips; S	Recruit ratings: Rivals: 247Sports: ESPN: (80)				
Taisun Phommachanh; QB	Avon, CT	Avon Old Farms	6 ft 3 in (1.91 m)	197 lb (89 kg)	Apr 14, 2018
Taisun Phommachanh; QB	Recruit ratings: Rivals: 247Sports: ESPN: (83)				
William Putnam; OG	Tampa, FL	Henry B. Plant High School	6 ft 4 in (1.93 m)	265 lb (120 kg)	Dec 20, 2018
William Putnam; OG	Recruit ratings: Rivals: 247Sports: ESPN: (84)				
Hunter Rayburn; OG	Pensacola, FL	Pensacola High School	6 ft 3 in (1.91 m)	320 lb (150 kg)	Jun 11, 2018
Hunter Rayburn; OG	Recruit ratings: Rivals: 247Sports: ESPN: (80)				
Etinosa Reuben; DT	Kansas City, MO	Park Hill High School	6 ft 3 in (1.91 m)	270 lb (120 kg)	Jul 29, 2018
Etinosa Reuben; DT	Recruit ratings: Rivals: 247Sports: ESPN: (79)				
Brannon Spector; WR	Calhoun, GA	Calhoun High School	6 ft 2 in (1.88 m)	187 lb (85 kg)	Oct 28, 2017
Brannon Spector; WR	Recruit ratings: Rivals: 247Sports: ESPN: (79)				
Aidan Swanson; K	Bradenton, FL	IMG Academy	6 ft 2 in (1.88 m)	170 lb (77 kg)	Mar 5, 2018
Aidan Swanson; K	Recruit ratings: Rivals: 247Sports: ESPN: (75)				
Ray Thornton; S	Phenix City, AL	Central High School	6 ft 2 in (1.88 m)	198 lb (90 kg)	Jun 22, 2018
Ray Thornton; S	Recruit ratings: Rivals: 247Sports: ESPN: (79)				
Mason Trotter; OG	Roebuck, SC	Dorman High School	6 ft 3 in (1.91 m)	275 lb (125 kg)	Feb 6, 2019
Mason Trotter; OG	Recruit ratings: 247Sports:				
Gregory Williams; OLB	Swansea, SC	Swansea High School	6 ft 3 in (1.91 m)	226 lb (103 kg)	Jun 21, 2018
Gregory Williams; OLB	Recruit ratings: Rivals: 247Sports: ESPN: (78)				
Lannden Zanders; S	Shelby, NC	Crest High School	6 ft 0 in (1.83 m)	190 lb (86 kg)	Apr 14, 2018
Lannden Zanders; S	Recruit ratings: Rivals: 247Sports: ESPN: (79)				
Overall recruit ranking: Rivals: 9 247Sports: 14 ESPN: 10
Note: In many cases, Scout, Rivals, 247Sports, On3, and ESPN may conflict in their listings of height and weight.; In these cases, the average was taken. ESPN grades are on a 100-point scale.; Sources: "Rivals commits". Rivals.; "ESPN commits". ESPN.; "2019 Team Ranking". Rivals.com.; "247Sports commits". 247Sports.

=== Offseason departures ===
==== NFL draftees ====
Player	Round	Pick	Team	Position
Clelin Ferrell	1	4	Oakland Raiders	DE
Christian Wilkins	1	13	Miami Dolphins	DT
Dexter Lawrence	1	17	New York Giants	DT
Trayvon Mullen	2	40	Oakland Raiders	CB
Austin Bryant	4	117	Detroit Lions	DE
Hunter Renfrow	5	149	Oakland Raiders	WR

==== Undrafted Free Agents ====
Player	Team	Position	Ref
Tre Lamar	Detroit Lions	LB	
Trevion Thompson	Los Angeles Chargers	WR	
Albert Huggins	Houston Texans	DT	
Mark Fields	Kansas City Chiefs	CB	

==== Transfers ====
Name	Number	Pos.	Height	Weight	Year	Hometown	College transferred to	Source(s)
Tavien Feaster	28	RB	5'11"	215	Senior	Spartanburg, SC	South Carolina	
Richard Yeargin	49	DT	6'5"	260	(redshirt) Junior	Lauderdale Lakes, FL	Boston College	
Shaq Smith	5	LB	6'2"	255	(redshirt) Junior	Baltimore, MD	Maryland	
Kyler McMichael	2	CB	6'0"	200	Sophomore	Norcross, GA	North Carolina	

== Preseason ==
=== Award watch lists ===
Listed in the order that they were released

Award	Player	Position	Year
Lott Trophy	Isaiah Simmons	LB	JR
Maxwell Award	Travis Etienne	RB	JR
Maxwell Award	Trevor Lawrence	QB	SO
Maxwell Award	Justyn Ross	WR	SO
Bednarik Award	Isaiah Simmons	LB	JR
Davey O'Brien Award	Trevor Lawrence	QB	SO
Doak Walker Award	Travis Etienne	RB	JR
Biletnikoff Award	Justyn Ross	WR	SO
Biletnikoff Award	Tee Higgins	WR	JR
Butkus Award	Isaiah Simmons	LB	JR
Rimington Trophy	Sean Pollard	OL	SR
Outland Trophy	Tremayne Anchrum	OL	SR
Bronko Nagurski Trophy	Isaiah Simmons	LB	JR
Dodd Trophy	Dabo Swinney	HC	–
Wuerffel Trophy	Sean Pollard	OL	SR
Walter Camp Award	Travis Etienne	RB	JR
Walter Camp Award	Trevor Lawrence	QB	SO
Walter Camp Award	Xavier Thomas	DE	SO

=== ACC Media Days ===
The ACC media poll was released on July 22, 2019. Clemson was the consensus pick to repeat once again as ACC champion, receiving 171 votes to win the Atlantic Division and 170 votes to win the conference championship.

== Schedule ==
Clemson announced its 2019 football schedule on January 16, 2019. The 2019 schedule consisted of seven home games and five away games in the regular season. The Tigers hosted ACC foes Georgia Tech, Florida State, Boston College, and Wake Forest and will travel to Syracuse, North Carolina, Louisville and NC State.

The Tigers hosted three of their four non-conference opponents, those being Texas A&M from the SEC, Charlotte from Conference USA and Wofford from the FCS' Southern Conference, and traveled to South Carolina from the SEC.

Date	Time	Opponent	Rank	Site	TV	Result	Attendance
August 29	8:00 p.m.	Georgia Tech	No. 1	Memorial Stadium; Clemson, SC (rivalry)	ACCN	W 52–14	79,118
September 7	3:30 p.m.	No. 12 Texas A&M*	No. 1	Memorial Stadium; Clemson, SC	ABC	W 24–10	81,500
September 14	7:30 p.m.	at Syracuse	No. 1	Carrier Dome; Syracuse, NY	ABC	W 41–6	50,249
September 21	7:30 p.m.	Charlotte*	No. 1	Memorial Stadium; Clemson, SC	ACCN	W 52–10	81,500
September 28	3:30 p.m.	at North Carolina	No. 1	Kenan Memorial Stadium; Chapel Hill, NC	ABC	W 21–20	50,500
October 12	3:30 p.m.	Florida State	No. 2	Memorial Stadium; Clemson, SC (rivalry)	ABC	W 45–14	80,500
October 19	Noon	at Louisville	No. 3	Cardinal Stadium; Louisville, KY	ABC	W 45–10	51,015
October 26	7:30 p.m.	Boston College^{†}	No. 4	Memorial Stadium; Clemson, SC (O'Rourke–McFadden Trophy)	ACCN	W 59–7	81,081
November 2	4:00 p.m.	No. 23 (FCS) Wofford*	No. 4	Memorial Stadium; Clemson, SC	ACCN	W 59–14	81,500
November 9	7:30 p.m.	at NC State	No. 5	Carter–Finley Stadium; Raleigh, NC (Textile Bowl)	ABC	W 55–10	57,886
November 16	3:30 p.m.	Wake Forest	No. 3	Memorial Stadium; Clemson, SC	ABC	W 52–3	80,875
November 30	Noon	at South Carolina*	No. 3	Williams–Brice Stadium; Columbia, SC (Palmetto Bowl)	ESPN	W 38–3	80,580
December 7	7:30 p.m.	vs. No. 23 Virginia	No. 3	Bank of America Stadium; Charlotte, NC (ACC Championship Game)	ABC	W 62–17	66,810
December 28	8:00 pm	vs. No. 2 Ohio State*	No. 3	State Farm Stadium; Glendale, AZ (Fiesta Bowl – CFP Semifinal)	ESPN	W 29–23	71,330
January 13, 2020	8:00 p.m	vs. No. 1 LSU*	No. 3	Mercedes-Benz Superdome; New Orleans, LA (CFP National Championship / SEC Nation)	ESPN	L 25–42	76,885
*Non-conference game; ^{†}Homecoming; Rankings from AP Poll and CFP Rankings after November 5 released prior to game; All times are in Eastern time

== Personnel ==
=== Coaching staff ===
Clemson Tigers football current coaching staff
Name	Position	Alma mater	Years at Clemson
Dabo Swinney	Head coach	University of Alabama (1993)	12th
Danny Pearman	Assistant head coach, Special Teams Coordinator, Tight Ends	Clemson University (1987)	10th
Jeff Scott	Co-offensive coordinator/wide receivers coach	Clemson University (2003)	4th
Brent Venables	Defensive coordinator/linebackers coach	Kansas State University (1992)	7th
Michael Reed	Defensive backs Coach	Boston College (1994)	6th
Todd Bates	Assistant coach, Defensive tackles	University of Alabama (2004)	2nd
Tony Elliott	Co-offensive coordinator/running backs coach	Clemson University (2002)	4th
Robbie Caldwell	Assistant coach, Offensive Linemen	Furman University (1977)	8th
Brandon Streeter	Assistant coach, Recruiting Coordinator, Quarterbacks	Clemson University (1999)	5th
Mike Reed	Assistant coach, Cornerbacks	Boston College (1994)	6th
Mickey Conn	Assistant coach, Safeties	University of Alabama (1995)	4th
Lemanski Hall	Assistant coach, Defensive Ends	University of Alabama (1993)	2nd

=== Roster ===
2019 Clemson Tigers Football
Quarterback: 7 Chase Brice – (redshirt) sophomore (6'2, 220); 11 Taisun Phommachanh – freshman (6'4, 210); 12 Ben Batson – (redshirt) freshman (6'0, 200); 15 Patrick McClure – (redshirt) sophomore (6'1, 195); 16 Trevor Lawrence – sophomore (6'6, 215); Running back: 9 Travis Etienne – junior (5'10, 200); 19 Michel Dukes – freshman (5'11, 190); 21 Darien Rencher – (redshirt) junior (5'8, 195); 23 Lyn-J Dixon – sophomore (5'10, 195); 27 Chez Mellusi – freshman (6'0, 175); 33 Ty Lucas – (redshirt) freshman (5'7, 205); Wide receiver: 2 Frank Ladson Jr. – freshman (6'4, 190); 3 Amari Rodgers – junior (5'10, 215); 5 Tee Higgins – junior (6'4, 210); 8 Justyn Ross – sophomore (6'4, 210); 10 Joseph Ngata – freshman (6'4, 215); 13 Brannon Specter – freshman (6'1, 190); 14 Diondre Overton – senior (6'4, 210); 17 Cornell Powell – (redshirt) junior (6'0, 210); 18 T.J. Chase – (redshirt) junior (6'0, 190); 22 Will Swinney – junior (5'8, 185); 29 Hampton Earle – freshman (5'11, 185); 45 Josh Jackson – (redshirt) junior (6'0, 195); 81 Drew Swinney – (redshirt) freshman (5'8, 180); 86 Will Brown – (redshirt) sophomore (5'8, 185); 86 Tye Herbstreit – freshman (6'0, 175); 87 Hamp Greene – freshman (5'10, 165); 89 Max May – (redshirt) freshman (6'1, 195); Tight end: 25 J.C. Chalk – (redshirt) junior (6'3, 260); 44 Garrett Williams – (redshirt) Graduate (6'2, 235); 80 Luke Price – (redshirt) sophomore (6'2, 220); 84 Davis Allen – freshman (6'5, 220); 85 Jaelyn Lay – freshman (6'5, 250); 87 J.L Banks – (redshirt) senior (6'1, 240); 88 Braden Galloway – sophomore (6'4, 240); Placekicker: 29 B. T. Potter – sophomore (5'10, 175); 41 Jonathan Weitz – freshman (6'0, 175)	Offensive lineman: 50 Kaleb Boateng – OL – freshman (6'5, 305); 54 Mason Trotter – OL – freshman (6'3, 270); 55 Hunter Rayburn – OL – freshman (6'4, 310); 56 Will Putnam – OL – freshman (6'4, 290); 59 Gage Cervenka – OL – (redshirt) Graduate (6'3, 325); 62 Cade Stewart – OL – (redshirt) junior (6'3, 310); 65 Matt Bockhorst – OG – (redshirt) sophomore (6'4, 310); 69 Marquis Sease – OL – (redshirt) sophomore (5'11, 275); 71 Jordan McFadden – OT – (redshirt) freshman (6'3, 300); 72 Blake Vinson – OT – (redshirt) sophomore (6'4, 285); 73 Tremayne Anchrum – OT – senior (6'2, 310); 74 John Simpson – OG – senior (6'4, 330); 76 Sean Pollard – OL – senior (6'5, 315); 78 Chandler Reeves – OT – (redshirt) junior (6'6, 295); 79 Jackson Carman – OL – sophomore (6'5, 345); Defensive lineman: 3 Xavier Thomas – DE – sophomore (6'2, 260); 5 KJ Henry – DE – (redshirt) freshman (6'4, 240); 7 Justin Mascoll – DE – (redshirt) freshman (6'4, 255); 13 Tyler Davis – DL – freshman (6'1, 290); 22 Xavier Kelly – DL – (redshirt) junior (6'4, 270); 32 Etinosa Reuben – DL – freshman (6'4, 280); 33 Ruke Orhorhoro – DL – freshman (6'5, 275); 35 Justin Foster – DE – junior (6'2, 260); 44 Nyles Pinckney – DT – (redshirt) Graduate (6'1, 300); 52 Tayquon Johnson – DL – freshman (6'3, 290); 54 Logan Rudolph – DE – (redshirt) sophomore (6'2, 245); 59 Jordan Williams – DT – (redshirt) sophomore (6'4, 310); 89 Tristan Walker – DE – (redshirt) junior (6'3, 225); 90 Darnell Jefferies – DT – (redshirt) freshman (6'2, 275); 91 Nick Eddis – DL – (redshirt) sophomore (6'2, 250); 92 Klayton Randolph – DE – (redshirt) freshman (6'2, 230); 94 Jacob Edwards – DE – (redshirt) sophomore (6'2, 285); 95 James Edwards – DT – (redshirt) sophomore (6'2, 285); 98 Logan Cash – DL – freshman (6'3, 255); Punter: 39 Aidan Swanson – freshman (6'3, 170); 48 Will Spiers – (redshirt) junior (6'5, 220); 98 Steven Sawicki – (redshirt) senior (6'3, 240)	Linebacker: 6 Mike Jones Jr. – (redshirt) freshman (6'0, 230); 10 Baylon Spector – (redshirt) sophomore (6'1, 230); 11 Isaiah Simmons – (redshirt) junior (6'4, 225); 15 Jake Venables – (redshirt) freshman (6'1, 225); 17 Kane Patterson – freshman (6'2, 225); 21 Bryton Constantin – freshman (6'2, 220); 30 Keith Maguire – freshman (6'2, 215); 40 Greg Williams – freshman (6'4, 235); 42 LaVonta Bradley – freshman (6'1, 215); 43 Chad Smith – (redshirt) Graduate (6'3, 240); 45 Matt McMahan – freshman (6'1, 205); 46 John Boyd – (redshirt) sophomore (6'0, 215); 47 James Skalski – (redshirt) junior (6'0, 245); 48 Landon Holden – (redshirt) sophomore (6'1, 240); 49 Matt Maloney – freshman (6'0, 190); 53 Regan Upshaw – (redshirt) junior (5'11, 235); Defensive back: 1 Derion Kendrick – CB/WR – sophomore (6'0, 180); 8 A. J. Terrell – CB – junior (6'2, 190); 9 Brian Dawkins Jr. – CB – (redshirt) junior (5'7, 170); 12 K'Von Wallace – S – senior (5'11, 210); 14 Denzel Johnson – S – (redshirt) senior (6'0, 205); 16 Ray Thornton III – DB – freshman (6'2, 205); 18 Joseph Charleston – DB – freshman (6'2, 190); 19 Tanner Muse – S – (redshirt) Graduate (6'1, 230); 20 LeAnthony Williams Jr. – CB – (redshirt) sophomore (5'11, 180); 23 Andrew Booth Jr. – DB – freshman (6'1, 180); 24 Nolan Turner – S – (redshirt) junior (6'1, 190); 25 Jalyn Phillips – DB – freshman (6'1, 185); 26 Jack McCall – CB – (redshirt) sophomore (5'11, 180); 26 Sheridan Jones – DB – freshman (6'1, 175); 27 Carson Donnelly – S – (redshirt) freshman (5'10, 180); 29 Michael Becker – S – (redshirt) freshman (6'1, 185); 31 Mario Goodrich – CB – sophomore (6'0, 195); 36 Landen Zanders – DB – freshman (6'1, 190); 37 Jake Herbstreit – DB – freshman (6'0, 175); 38 Elijah Turner – S – (redshirt) junior (5'11, 190); 47 Peter Cote – S – (redshirt) sophomore (5'9, 180); Long snappers: 46 Jack Maddox – (redshirt) sophomore (6'3, 220); 52 Tyler Brown – (redshirt) junior (6'0, 215); 58 Patrick Phibbs – (redshirt) senior (6'2, 210)

=== Depth chart ===
Defense

FS
Tanner Muse
Denzel Johnson
⋅

SAM	MLB	SLB
Baylon Spector	James Skalski	Isaiah Simmons
⋅	Chad Smith	Mike Jones Jr.
⋅	⋅	⋅

SS
K'Von Wallace
Nolan Turner
⋅

CB
A. J. Terrell
Sheridan Jones
⋅

DE	DT	DT	DE
Justin Foster	Jordan Williams	Nyles Pinckney	Xavier Thomas
KJ Henry	Xavier Kelly	Tyler Davis	Justin Mascoll
⋅	⋅	⋅	⋅

CB
Derion Kendrick
Andrew Booth Jr.
⋅

Offense

WR
Tee Higgins
Joseph Ngata
Brannon Spector

WR
Justyn Ross
Cornell Powell
Frank Ladson

LT	LG	C	RG	RT
Jackson Carman	John Simpson	Sean Pollard	Gage Cervenka	Tremayne Anchrum
Jordan McFadden	Matt Bockhorst	Cade Stewart	Chandler Reeves	Blake Vinson
⋅	⋅	⋅	⋅	⋅

TE
J.C. Chalk
Jaelyn Lay
Luke Price

WR
Diondre Overton
T.J. Chase
Will Swinney

QB
Trevor Lawrence
Chase Brice
Taisun Phommachanh

Key reserves
Offense
Amari Rodgers (inj)
Defense
Out (Suspension)
Out (Season)
Out (Mission)
Out (Transfer)

Special teams
PK B. T. Potter
P Will Spiers
KR Derion Kendrick
Travis Etienne
PR Amari Rodgers
Cole Renfrow
LS Patrick Phibbs
H Will Swinney
Will Spiers

RB
Travis Etienne
Lyn-J Dixon
Darien Rencher

== Rankings ==
Ranking movements Legend: ██ Increase in ranking ██ Decrease in ranking ( ) = First-place votes
	Week																
Poll	Pre	1	2	3	4	5	6	7	8	9	10	11	12	13	14	15	Final
AP	1 (52)	1 (54)	1 (56)	1 (57)	1 (55)	2 (18)	2 (15)	3 (11)	4 (9)	4 (7)	4 (7)	3 (3)	3 (3)	3 (3)	3 (3)	3 (3)	2
Coaches	1 (59)	1 (58)	1 (60)	1 (62)	1 (62)	2 (30)	2 (20)	2 (14)	2 (10)	3 (10)	3 (9)	3 (4)	3 (4)	3 (4)	3 (4)	3 (5)	2
CFP	Not released										5	3	3	3	3	3	Not released

== Game summaries ==
=== Georgia Tech ===
Georgia Tech Yellow Jackets at Clemson Tigers − Game summary

Quarter	1	2	3	4	Total
Georgia Tech	0	0	7	7	14
No. 1 Clemson	14	14	14	10	52

at Memorial Stadium • Clemson, SC

- Date: August 29, 2019
- Game time: 8:06 p.m.
- Game weather: Temperature: 79 °F (26 °C) • Wind: Light • Weather: Sunny
- Game attendance: 79,118
- Referee: Tra Blake
- TV announcers (ACCN): Dave O’Brien (play-by-play), Tim Hasselbeck (color), Katie George, and Maria Taylor (sideline)

Game information

First quarter

- 11:52 CLEM TD – Trevor Lawrence 6 yard run, (B. T. Potter PAT)
- 05:39 CLEM TD – Travis Etienne 90 yard run, (Potter PAT)

Second quarter

- 12:45 CLEM TD – Etienne 14 yard run, (Potter PAT)
- 04:34 CLEM TD – Lawrence 62 yard pass to Tee Higgins, (Potter PAT)

Third quarter

- 12:42 CLEM TD – Etienne 48 yard run, (Potter PAT)
- 11:40 GT TD – Jordan Mason 7 yard run, (Wesley Wells PAT)
- 08:08 CLEM TD – Lyn-J Dixon 18 yard run, (Potter PAT)

Fourth quarter

- 14:54 CLEM TD – Chase Brice 21 yard pass to Frank Ladson, (Potter PAT)
- 10:33 GT TD – James Graham 28 yard pass to Ahmarean Brown, (Wells PAT)
- 06:11 CLEM FG – Potter 51 yard Field Goal

Top passers

- CLEM – Trevor Lawrence: 13–23, 168 yards, 1 TD, 2 INT
- GT – James Graham: 4–7, 72 yards, 1 TD

Top rushers

- CLEM – Travis Etienne: 12 rushes, 207 yards, 3 TD
- GT – Jordan Mason: 13 rushes, 72 yards, 1 TD

Top Receiving

- CLEM – Tee Higgins: 4 receptions, 98 yards, 1 TD
- GT – Jerry Howard: 2 receptions, 57 yards

=== Texas A&M ===
Texas A&M Aggies at Clemson Tigers − Game summary

Quarter	1	2	3	4	Total
No. 12 Texas A&M	0	3	0	7	10
No. 1 Clemson	0	17	7	0	24

at Memorial Stadium • Clemson, SC

- Date: September 7, 2019
- Game time: 3:30 p.m.
- Game weather: Temperature: 94 °F (34 °C) • Wind: North, 2 mph (3.2 km/h) • Weather: Sunny
- Game attendance: 81,500
- Referee: James Carter
- TV announcers (ABC): Sean McDonough (play-by-play), Todd Blackledge (color), Holly Rowe (sideline)

Game information

Second quarter

- 14:18 TEX A&M FG – Seth Small 32 yard Field Goal
- 10:52 CLEM TD – Trevor Lawrence 30 yard pass to Justyn Ross, (B. T. Potter PAT)
- 04:57 CLEM FG – Potter 29 yard Field Goal
- 00:33 CLEM TD – Lawrence 1 yard run, (Potter PAT)

Third quarter

- 05:50 CLEM TD – Lyn-J Dixon 4 yard run, (Potter PAT)

Fourth quarter

- 00:06 TEX A&M TD – Kellen Mond 2 yard pass to Jalen Wydermyer, (Small PAT)

Top passers

- CLEM – Trevor Lawrence: 24–35, 268 yards, 1 TD, 1 INT
- TEX A&M – Kellen Mond: 24–42, 236 yards, 1 TD, 1 INT

Top rushers

- CLEM – Lyn-J Dixon: 11 rushes, 79 yards, 1 TD
- TEX A&M – Jashaun Corbin: 13 rushes, 24 yards

Top Receiving

- CLEM – Justyn Ross: 7 receptions, 94 yards, 1 TD
- TEX A&M – Jhamon Ausbon: 7 receptions, 69 yards

=== At Syracuse ===
Clemson Tigers at Syracuse Orange − Game summary

Quarter	1	2	3	4	Total
No. 1 Clemson	14	3	10	14	41
Syracuse	0	6	0	0	6

at Carrier Dome • Syracuse, NY

- Date: September 14, 2019
- Game time: 7:30 p.m.
- Game weather: Temperature: N/A (Indoors) • Wind: N/A (Indoors) • Weather: N/A (Indoors)
- Game attendance: 50,248
- Referee: Marcus Woods
- TV announcers (ABC): Sean McDonough (play-by-play), Kirk Herbstreit (analyst), Maria Taylor (sideline)

Game information

First quarter

- 10:29 CLEM TD – Trevor Lawrence 16 yard pass to Amari Rodgers, (B. T. Potter PAT)
- 05:34 CLEM TD – Lawrence 1 yard run, (Potter PAT)

Second quarter

- 12:24 SU FG – Andre Szmyt 29 yard Field Goal
- 04:31 CLEM FG – Potter 40 yard Field Goal
- 02:00 SU FG – Szmyt 23 yard Field Goal

Third quarter

- 09:42 CLEM TD – Lawrence 87 yard pass to Rodgers, (Potter PAT)
- 02:24 CLEM FG – Potter 37 yard Field Goal

Fourth quarter

- 10:11 CLEM TD – Lawrence 7 yard pass to Frank Ladson, (Potter PAT)
- 00:48 CLEM TD – Chez Mellusi 57 yard run, (Potter PAT)

Top passers

- CLEM – Trevor Lawrence: 22–39, 395 yards, 3 TD, 2 INT
- CUSE – Tommy DeVito: 15–27, 172 yards, 1 INT

Top rushers

- CLEM – Travis Etienne: 14 rushes, 76 yards
- CUSE – Abdul Adams: 14 rushes, 41 yards

Top Receiving

- CLEM – Tee Higgins: 7 receptions, 150 yards
- CUSE – Moe Neal: 2 receptions, 67 yards

=== Charlotte ===
Charlotte 49ers at Clemson Tigers − Game summary

Quarter	1	2	3	4	Total
Charlotte	0	3	7	0	10
No. 1 Clemson	17	21	7	7	52

at Memorial Stadium • Clemson, SC

- Date: September 21, 2019
- Game time: 7:35 p.m.
- Game weather: Temperature: 84 °F (29 °C) • Wind: South @ 3 mph (4.8 km/h) • Weather: Clear
- Game attendance: 81,500
- Referee: Jeff Macongghy
- TV announcers (ACCN): Dave O’Brien (play-by-play), Tim Hasselbeck (color), Katie George (sideline)

Game information

First quarter

- 13:35 CLEM TD – Trevor Lawrence 58 yard pass to Tee Higgins, (B. T. Potter PAT)
- 10:24 CLEM TD – K'Von Wallace 66 yard Interception return, (Potter PAT)
- 05:03 CLEM FG – Potter 22 yard Field Goal

Second quarter

- 14:56 CLEM TD – Lawrence 2 yard pass to Cornell Powell, (Potter PAT)
- 08:31 CLEM TD – Travis Etienne 2 yard run, (Potter PAT)
- 04:27 CHAR FG – Jonathan Cruz 24 yard Field Goal
- 01:24 CLEM TD – Lyn-J Dixon 1 yard run, (Potter PAT)

Third quarter

- 09:51 CLEM TD – Chase Brice 37 yard pass to Joseph Ngata, (Steven Sawicki PAT)
- 05:53 CHAR TD – Chris Reynolds 8 yard run, (Cruz PAT)

Fourth quarter

- 06:12 CLEM TD – Michel Dukes 24 yard run, (Sawicki PAT)

Top passers

- CLEM – Trevor Lawrence: 7–9, 94 yards, 2 TDs
- CHAR – Chris Reynolds: 6–16, 43 yards, 1 INT

Top rushers

- CLEM – Travis Etienne: 11 rushes, 61 yards, 1 TD
- CHAR – Benny LeMay: 18 rushes, 81 yards

Top Receiving

- CLEM – Joseph Ngata: 3 receptions, 62 yards, 1 TD
- CHAR – Cameron Dollar: 1 reception, 15 yards

=== At North Carolina ===
Clemson Tigers at North Carolina Tar Heels − Game summary

Quarter	1	2	3	4	Total
No. 1 Clemson	0	14	0	7	21
North Carolina	7	7	0	6	20

at Kenan Memorial Stadium • Chapel Hill, NC

- Date: September 28, 2019
- Game time: 3:30 p.m.
- Game weather: Temperature: 91 °F (33 °C) • Wind: West @ 7 mph (11 km/h) • Weather: Sunny
- Game attendance: 50,500
- Referee: Riley Johnson
- TV announcers (ABC): Dave Pasch (play-by-play), Greg McElroy (color), Tom Luginbill (sideline)

Game information

First quarter

- 13:15 UNC TD – Sam Howell 40 yard pass to Dyami Brown, (Noah Ruggles PAT)

Second quarter

- 12:43 CLEM TD – Travis Etienne 13 yard run, (B. T. Potter PAT)
- 07:55 UNC TD – Howell 10 yard pass to Beau Corrales, (Ruggles PAT)
- 00:33 CLEM TD – Trevor Lawrence 3 yard run, (Potter PAT)

Fourth quarter

- 09:54 CLEM TD – Lawrence 38 yard pass to Tee Higgins, (Potter PAT)
- 01:17 UNC TD – Javonte Williams 1 yard run, (2 Point Conversion Failed)

Top passers

- CLEM – Trevor Lawrence: 18–30, 206 yards, 1 TD
- UNC – Sam Howell: 15–27, 144 yards, 2 TDs

Top rushers

- CLEM – Travis Etienne: 14 rushes, 67 yards, 1 TD
- UNC – Michael Carter: 16 rushes, 99 yards

Top Receiving

- CLEM – Tee Higgins: 3 receptions, 129 yards, 1 TD
- UNC – Dyami Brown: 3 receptions, 63 yards, 1 TD

=== Florida State ===
Florida State Seminoles at Clemson Tigers − Game summary

Quarter	1	2	3	4	Total
Florida State	0	0	7	7	14
No. 2 Clemson	14	14	14	3	45

at Memorial Stadium • Clemson, SC

- Date: October 12, 2019
- Game time: 3:30 p.m.
- Game weather: Temperature: 84 °F (29 °C) • Wind: WSW @ 11 mph (18 km/h) • Weather: Sunny
- Game attendance: 80,500
- Referee: Jeff Heaser
- TV announcers (ABC): Steve Levy (play-by-play), Brian Griese (color), Molly McGrath and Todd McShay (sideline)

Game information

First quarter

- 12:09 CLEM TD – Trevor Lawrence 3 yard TD pass to Travis Etienne, (B. T. Potter PAT)
- 04:41 CLEM TD – Lawrence 8 yard run, (Potter PAT)

Second quarter

- 13:13 CLEM TD – Lawrence 10 yard pass to Justyn Ross, (Potter PAT)
- 08:58 CLEM TD – Lawrence 8 yard pass to Ross, (Potter PAT)

Third quarter

- 11:49 CLEM TD – Amari Rodgers 29 yard run, (Steven Sawicki PAT)
- 09:39 CLEM TD – Derion Kendrick 38 yard interception return, (Sawicki PAT)
- 02:02 FSU TD – Alex Hornibrook 64 yard pass to Tamorrion Terry, (Ricky Aguayo PAT)

Fourth quarter

- 04:58 CLEM FG – Sawicki 26 yard Field Goal
- 02:41 FSU TD – Khalan Laborn 40 yard run, (Aguayo PAT)

Top passers

- CLEM – Trevor Lawrence: 17–25, 170 yards, 3 TDs, 1 INT
- FSU – Alex Hornibrook: 8–12, 84 yards, 1 TD, 1 INT

Top rushers

- CLEM – Travis Etienne: 17 rushes, 127 yards
- FSU – Khalan Laborn: 8 rushes, 69 yards, 1 TD

Top Receiving

- CLEM – Justyn Ross: 5 receptions, 61 yards, 2 TDs
- FSU – Tamorrion Terry: 2 receptions, 83 yards, 1 TD

=== At Louisville ===
Clemson Tigers at Louisville Cardinals − Game summary

Quarter	1	2	3	4	Total
No. 3 Clemson	3	14	7	21	45
Louisville	0	3	0	7	10

at Cardinal Stadium • Louisville, KY

- Date: October 19, 2019
- Game time: Noon
- Game weather: Temperature: 63 °F (17 °C) • Wind: SE @ 7 mph (11 km/h) • Weather: Partly Cloudy
- Game attendance: 51,015
- Referee: T. Blake
- TV announcers (ABC): Bob Wischusen (play-by-play), Dan Orlovsky (color), Allison Williams (sideline)

Game information

First quarter

- 09:27 CLEM FG – B. T. Potter 51 yard Field Goal

Second quarter

- 10:41 CLEM TD – Trevor Lawrence 6 yard pass to Joseph Ngata, (Steven Sawicki PAT)
- 04:54 LOU FG – Blanton Creque 28 yard Field Goal
- 00:05 CLEM TD – Lawrence 25 yard pass to Justyn Ross, (Sawicki PAT)

Third quarter

- 01:35 CLEM TD – Travis Etienne 49 yard run, (Potter PAT)

Fourth quarter

- 12:43 CLEM TD – Lawrence 10 yard pass to Cornell Powell, (Potter PAT)
- 10:14 CLEM TD – Darien Rencher 8 yard run, (Potter PAT)
- 05:10 LOU TD – Javian Hawkins 3 yard run, (Creque PAT)
- 01:00 CLEM TD – Chez Mellusi 16 yard run, (Potter PAT)

Top passers

- CLEM – Trevor Lawrence: 20–29, 233 yards, 3 TDs, 2 INTs
- LOU – Malik Cunningham: 4–11, 63 yards, 1 INT

Top rushers

- CLEM – Travis Etienne: 14 carries, 192 yards, 1 TD
- LOU – Javian Hawkins: 26 carries, 129 yards, 1 TD

Top Receiving

- CLEM – Amari Rodgers: 3 receptions, 78 yards
- LOU – Dez Fitzpatrick: 3 receptions, 63 yards

=== Boston College ===
Boston College Eagles at Clemson Tigers − Game summary

Quarter	1	2	3	4	Total
Boston College	0	7	0	0	7
No. 4 Clemson	17	21	14	7	59

at Memorial Stadium • Clemson, SC

- Date: October 26, 2019
- Game time: 7:30 p.m.
- Game weather: Temperature: 69 °F (21 °C) • Wind: ENE @ 6 mph (9.7 km/h) • Weather: Cloudy
- Game attendance: 81,081
- Referee: Stuart Mullins
- TV announcers (ACCN): Dave O’Brien (play-by-play), Tim Hasselbeck (color), Katie George (sideline)

Game information

First quarter

- 10:53 CLEM FG – B. T. Potter 23 yard Field Goal
- 06:57 CLEM TD – Travis Etienne 3 yard run, (Potter PAT)
- 04:43 CLEM TD – Trevor Lawrence 22 yard pass to Diondre Overton, (Potter PAT)

Second quarter

- 13:59 BC TD – A. J. Dillon 9 yard run, (Aaron Boumerhi PAT)
- 10:29 CLEM TD – Etienne 4 yard run, (Potter PAT)
- 06:07 CLEM TD – Lawrence 19 yard pass to Amari Rodgers, (Potter PAT)
- 00:38 CLEM TD – Etienne 5 yard run, (Potter PAT)

Third quarter

- 11:18 CLEM TD – Logan Rudolph 39 yard fumble recovery, (Potter PAT)
- 9:00 CLEM TD – Lawrence 63 yard pass to Overton, (Potter PAT)

Fourth quarter

- 13:37 CLEM TD – Chase Brice 34 yard pass to Overton, (Potter PAT)

Top passers

- CLEM – Trevor Lawrence: 16–19, 275 yards, 3 TDs
- BC – Dennis Grossel: 3–14, 53 yards

Top rushers

- CLEM – Travis Etienne: 16 carries, 109 yards, 3 TDs
- BC – A. J. Dillon: 19 carries, 76 yards, 1 TD

Top Receiving

- CLEM – Diondre Overton: 3 receptions, 119 yards, 3 TDs
- BC – Hunter Long: 3 receptions, 39 yards

=== Wofford ===
Wofford Terriers at Clemson Tigers − Game summary

Quarter	1	2	3	4	Total
No. 23 (FCS) Wofford	0	0	14	0	14
No. 4 Clemson	21	21	14	3	59

at Memorial Stadium • Clemson, SC

- Date: November 2, 2019
- Game time: 4:00 p.m.
- Game weather: Temperature: 63 °F (17 °C) • Wind: West @ 6 mph (9.7 km/h) • Weather: Clear
- Game attendance: 81,500
- Referee: Jeff Flanagan
- TV announcers (ACCN): Chris Cotter (play-by-play), Mark Herzlich (color), Kelsey Riggs (sideline)

Game information

First quarter

- 13:00 CLEM TD – Trevor Lawrence 35 yard pass to Amari Rodgers, (B. T. Potter PAT)
- 09:18 CLEM TD – Lyn-J Dixon 19 yard run, (Potter PAT)
- 05:53 CLEM TD – Travis Etienne 47 yard run, (Potter PAT)

Second quarter

- 14:48 CLEM TD – Etienne 86 yard run, (Potter PAT)
- 08:02 CLEM TD – Lawrence 22 yard pass to Tee Higgins, (Potter PAT)
- 04:47 CLEM TD – Lawrence 2 yard run, (Potter PAT)

Third quarter

- 10:48 CLEM TD – Lawrence 34 yard pass to Justyn Ross, (Potter PAT)
- 06:36 WOF TD – Ryan Lovelace 20 yard run, (Luke Carter PAT)
- 03:10 CLEM TD – Darien Rencher 3 yard run, (Potter PAT)
- 03:09 WOF TD – Joe Newman 79 yard pass to D'mauriae VanCleave, (Carter PAT)

Fourth quarter

- 05:07 CLEM TD – Potter 35 yard Field Goal

Top passers

- CLEM – Trevor Lawrence: 12–16, 218 yards, 3 TDs
- WOFF – Joe Newman: 3–9, 111 yards, 1 TD, 1 INT

Top rushers

- CLEM – Travis Etienne: 9 rushes, 212 yards, 2 TDs
- WOFF – Ryan Lovelace: 10 rushes, 46 yards, 1 TD

Top Receiving

- CLEM – Tee Higgins: 5 receptions, 74 yards, 1 TD
- WOFF – D'Mauriae VanCleave: 1 reception, 79 yards, 1 TD

=== At NC State ===
Clemson Tigers at NC State Wolfpack − Game summary

Quarter	1	2	3	4	Total
No. 5 Clemson	28	14	7	6	55
NC State	0	0	7	3	10

at Carter–Finley Stadium • Raleigh, NC

- Date: November 9, 2019
- Game time: 7:30 p.m.
- Game weather: Temperature: 45 °F (7 °C) • Wind: North @ 1 mph (1.6 km/h) • Weather: Clear
- Game attendance: 57,886
- Referee: Jeff Heaser
- TV announcers (ABC): Chris Fowler (play-by-play), Kirk Herbstreit (analyst), Maria Taylor (sideline)

Game information

First quarter

- 10:56 CLEM TD – Trevor Lawrence 7 yard run, (B. T. Potter PAT)
- 05:00 CLEM TD – Lawrence 33 yard pass to Tee Higgins, (Potter PAT)
- 03:31 CLEM TD – Lawrence 4 yard pass to Travis Etienne, (Potter PAT)
- 01:31 CLEM TD – Etienne 19 yard run, (Potter PAT)

Second quarter

- 04:30 CLEM TD – John Simpson 1 yard run, (Potter PAT)
- 00:45 CLEM TD – Lawrence 33 yard pass to Justyn Ross, (Potter PAT)

Third quarter

- 13:04 NCST TD – Zonovan Knight 53 yard run, (Christopher Dunn PAT)
- 06:21 CLEM TD – Etienne 8 yard run, (Potter PAT)

Fourth quarter

- 13:43 NCST FG – Christopher Dunn 46 yard Field Goal
- 00:11 CLEM TD – Michel Dukes 1 yard run, (James Skalski kick failed)

Top passers

- CLEM – Trevor Lawrence: 20–27, 276 yards, 3 TDs
- NCST – Devin Leary: 14–29, 166 yards

Top rushers

- CLEM – Travis Etienne: 14 rushes, 112 yards, 2 TDs
- NCST – Zonovan Knight: 12 rushes, 139 yards, 1 TD

Top Receiving

- CLEM – Justyn Ross: 4 receptions, 75 yards, 1 TD
- NCST – Cary Angeline: 2 receptions, 53 yards

=== Wake Forest ===
Wake Forest Demon Deacons at Clemson Tigers − Game summary

Quarter	1	2	3	4	Total
Wake Forest	3	0	0	0	3
No. 3 Clemson	14	17	14	7	52

at Memorial Stadium • Clemson, SC

- Date: November 16, 2019
- Game time: 3:30 p.m.
- Game weather: Temperature: 62 °F (17 °C) • Wind: East @ 9 mph (14 km/h) • Weather: Cloudy
- Game attendance: 80,875
- Referee: Jeff Flanagan
- TV announcers (ABC): Bob Wischusen (play-by-play), Dan Orlovsky (color), Allison Williams (sideline)

Game information

First quarter

- 11:40 CLEM TD – Trevor Lawrence 14 yard pass to Tee Higgins, (B. T. Potter PAT)
- 09:55 CLEM TD – Travis Etienne 14 yard run, (Potter PAT)
- 01:29 WAKE FG – Nick Sciba 30 yard Field Goal

Second quarter

- 08:45 CLEM FG – Potter 35 yard Field Goal
- 00:42 CLEM TD – Lawrence 14 yard pass to Higgins, (Potter PAT)
- 00:13 CLEM TD – Lawrence 30 yard pass to Higgins, (Potter PAT)

Third quarter

- 10:40 CLEM TD – Lawrence 10 yard pass to Frank Ladson Jr., (Potter PAT)
- 07:05 CLEM TD – Lyn-J Dixon 9 yard run, (Potter PAT)

Fourth quarter

- 11:49 CLEM TD – Chase Brice 21 yard pass to Joseph Ngata, (Potter PAT)

Top passers

- CLEM – Trevor Lawrence: 21–27, 272 yards, 4 TDs
- WAKE – Jamie Newman: 6–14, 41 yards, 2 INTs

Top rushers

- CLEM – Travis Etienne: 16 rushes, 121 yards, 1 TD
- WAKE – Kendrell Flowers: 9 rushes, 38 yards

Top Receiving

- CLEM – Tee Higgins: 4 receptions, 64 yards, 3 TDs
- WAKE – Kendall Hinton: 2 receptions, 17 yards

=== At South Carolina ===
Clemson Tigers at South Carolina Gamecocks − Game summary

Quarter	1	2	3	4	Total
No. 3 Clemson	14	10	7	7	38
South Carolina	0	3	0	0	3

at Williams–Brice Stadium • Columbia, SC

- Date: November 30, 2019
- Game weather: Temperature: 60 °F (16 °C) • Wind: SSW @ 4 mph (6.4 km/h) • Weather: Partly Cloudy
- Game attendance: 80,580
- Referee: Stuart Mullins
- TV announcers (ESPN): Dave Pasch (play-by-play), Greg McElroy (color), Tom Luginbill (sideline)

Game information

First quarter

- 06:58 CLEM TD – Trevor Lawrence 10 yard pass to Tee Higgins, (B. T. Potter PAT)
- 03:46 CLEM TD – Lawrence 65 yard pass to Higgins, (Potter PAT)

Second quarter

- 07:33 USC FG – Parker White 49 yard Field Goal
- 03:04 CLEM TD – Lawrence 16 yard pass to Justyn Ross, (Potter PAT)
- 00:00 CLEM FG – Potter 46 yard Field Goal

Third quarter

- 09:59 CLEM TD – Travis Etienne 2 yard run, (Potter PAT)

Fourth quarter

- 11:56 CLEM TD – Etienne 3 yard run, (Potter PAT)

Top passers

- CLEM – Trevor Lawrence: 26–36, 295 yards, 3 TDs
- USC – Ryan Hilinski: 16–27, 105 yards, 1 INT

Top rushers

- CLEM – Trevor Lawrence: 8 rushes, 66 yards
- USC – Tavien Feaster: 12 rushes, 47 yards

Top Receiving

- CLEM – Justyn Ross: 9 receptions, 111 yards, 1 TD
- USC – Shi Smith: 5 receptions, 40 yards

=== ACC Championship Game ===
Clemson Tigers vs. Virginia Cavaliers − Game summary

Quarter	1	2	3	4	Total
No. 23 Virginia	7	0	7	3	17
No. 3 Clemson	14	17	14	17	62

at Bank of America Stadium • Charlotte, NC

- Date: December 7, 2019
- Game weather: Temperature: 51 °F (11 °C) • Wind: ENE @ 7 mph (11 km/h) • Weather: Clear
- Game attendance: 66,810
- TV announcers (ABC): Steve Levy (play-by-play), Brian Griese (color), Todd McShay, and Maria Taylor (sideline)

Game information

First quarter

- 11:11 CLEM TD – Trevor Lawrence 19 yard pass to Tee Higgins, (B. T. Potter PAT)
- 06:22 UVA TD – Bryce Perkins 20 yard pass to Hasise Dubois, (Brian Delaney PAT)
- 04:46 CLEM TD – Lawrence 59 yard pass to Justyn Ross, (Potter PAT)

Second quarter

- 13:23 CLEM FG – Potter 47 yard field goal
- 09:10 CLEM TD – Travis Etienne 26 yard run, (Potter PAT)
- 00:49 CLEM TD – Lawrence 7 yard pass to Higgins, (Potter PAT)

Third quarter

- 08:21 UVA TD – Perkins 8 yard pass to Terrell Jana, (Delaney PAT)
- 06:12 CLEM TD – Lawrence 11 yard pass to Higgins, (Potter PAT)
- 1:00 CLEM TD – Lyn-J Dixon 23 yard run, (Potter PAT)

Fourth quarter

- 13:11 UVA FG – Delaney 35 yard field goal
- 10:45 CLEM FG – Potter 35 yard field goal
- 08:13 CLEM TD – Chase Brice 4 yard run, (Potter PAT)
- 01:26 CLEM TD – Chez Mellusi 4 yard run, (Potter PAT)

Top passers

- CLEM – Trevor Lawrence: 16–22, 302 yards, 4 TDs
- UVA – Bryce Perkins: 27–43, 266 yards, 2 TDs, 2 INTs

Top rushers

- CLEM – Travis Etienne: 14 carries, 114 yards, 1 TD
- UVA – Bryce Perkins: 17 carries, 58 yards

Top Receiving

- CLEM – Tee Higgins: 9 receptions, 182 yards, 3 TDs
- UVA – Hasise Dubois: 10 receptions, 130 yards, 1 TD

=== vs. Ohio State (Fiesta Bowl – CFP Semifinal Game) ===
Clemson Tigers vs. Ohio State Buckeyes − Game summary

Quarter	1	2	3	4	Total
No. 3 Clemson	0	14	7	8	29
No. 2 Ohio State	10	6	0	7	23

at State Farm Stadium • Glendale, AZ

- Date: December 28, 2019
- Game time: 8:10 p.m. EST
- Game weather: Indoors (roof closed)
- Game attendance: 71,330
- Referee: Ken Williamson
- TV announcers (ESPN): Chris Fowler (play-by-play), Kirk Herbstreit (analyst), Maria Taylor, and Tom Rinaldi (sideline)

Game information

First Quarter

- (12:03) OHST – Blake Haubeil 21 yard field goal (Drive: 10 plays, 71 yards, 2:57; Ohio State 3–0)
- (8:35) OHST – J. K. Dobbins 68 yard rush, Blake Haubeil kick (Drive: 1 play, 68 yards, 0:09; Ohio State 10–0)

Second Quarter

- (14:11) OHST – Blake Haubeil 22 yard field goal (Drive: 7 plays, 75 yards, 1:42; Ohio State 13–0)
- (7:20) OHST – Blake Haubeil 33 yard field goal (Drive: 14 plays, 70 yards, 4:55; Ohio State 16–0)
- (2:45) CLEM – Travis Etienne 8 yard rush, B. T. Potter (Drive: 10 plays, 75 yards, 4:35; Ohio State 16–7)
- (1:10) CLEM – Trevor Lawrence 67 yard rush, Potter kick (Drive: 5 plays, 83 yards, 0:45; Ohio State 16–14)

Third Quarter

- (7:54) CLEM – Lawrence 53 yard pass to Etienne, Potter kick (Drive: 7 plays, 99 yards, 2:45; Clemson 21–16)

Fourth Quarter

- (11:46) OSU – Justin Fields 23 yard pass to Chris Olave, Blake Haubeil kick (Drive: 13 plays, 84 yards, 4:52; Ohio State 23–21)
- (1:49) CLEM – Lawrence 34 yard pass to Etienne, 2-point pass good (Drive: 4 plays, 94 yards, 1:18; Clemson 29–23)

Top passers

- CLEM – Trevor Lawrence: 18–33, 295 yards, 2 TDs
- OSU – Justin Fields: 30–46, 320 yards, 1 TD, 2 INTs

Top rushers

- CLEM – Trevor Lawrence: 16 carries, 107 yards, 1 TD
- OSU – J. K. Dobbins: 18 rushes, 174 yards, 1 TD

Top Receiving

- CLEM – Justyn Ross: 4 receptions, 47 yards
- OSU – K. J. Hill: 6 receptions, 67 yards

=== vs. LSU (CFP National Championship) ===
Clemson Tigers vs LSU Tigers − Game summary

Quarter	1	2	3	4	Total
No. 3 Clemson	7	10	8	0	25
No. 1 LSU	7	21	7	7	42

at Mercedes-Benz Superdome • New Orleans, Louisiana

- Date: January 13, 2020
- Game time: 8:00 p.m. EST
- Game weather: Indoors
- Game attendance: 76,885
- Referee: Chris Cotye
- TV announcers (ESPN): Chris Fowler (play-by-play), Kirk Herbstreit (analyst), Maria Taylor, and Tom Rinaldi (sideline)

Game information

First Quarter

- 06:34 CLEM TD – Trevor Lawrence 1 yard run, (B. T. Potter PAT)
- 02:20 LSU TD – Joe Burrow 52 yard pass to Ja'Marr Chase, (Cade York PAT)

Second Quarter

- 13:43 CLEM FG – Potter 52 yard field goal
- 10:38 CLEM TD – Tee Higgins 36 yard run, (Potter PAT)
- 09:17 LSU TD – Burrow 3 yard run, (York PAT)
- 05:19 LSU TD – Burrow 14 yard pass to Chase, (York PAT)
- 00:10 LSU TD – Burrow 6 yard pass to Thaddeus Moss, (York PAT)

Third Quarter

- 10:49 CLEM TD – Travis Etienne 3 yard run, (2 point conversion good)
- 05:13 LSU TD – Burrow 4 yard pass to Moss, (York PAT)

Fourth Quarter

- 12:08 LSU TD – Burrow 24 yard pass to Terrace Marshall Jr., (York PAT)

Top passers

- CLEM – Trevor Lawrence: 18–37, 234 yards
- LSU – Joe Burrow: 31–49, 463 yards, 5 TDs

Top rushers

- CLEM – Travis Etienne: 15 rushes, 78 yards, 1 TD
- LSU – Clyde Edwards-Helaire: 16 rushes, 110 yards

Top Receiving

- CLEM – Justyn Ross: 5 receptions, 76 yards
- LSU – Ja'Marr Chase: 9 receptions, 221 yards, 2 TDs

== Awards and honors ==
Weekly Awards
Player	Award	Date	Ref.
Isaiah Simmons	Walter Camp Player of the Week	September 15, 2019	

Individual Awards
Player	Position	Award	Ref.
Travis Etienne	RB	ACC Player of the Year	
Travis Etienne	RB	ACC Offensive Player of the Year	
Isaiah Simmons	LB	ACC Defensive Player of the Year	
Isaiah Simmons	LB	Butkus Award	

All-American
Player	AP	AFCA	FWAA	TSN	WCFF	Designation
Isaiah Simmons	1	1	1	1	1	Unanimous
Travis Etienne	2	2	2	2	2	
John Simpson	2	1	1	1	1	Consensus
The NCAA recognizes a selection to all five of the AP, AFCA, FWAA, TSN and WCFF first teams for unanimous selections and three of five for consensus selections. HM = Honorable mention. Source:

All-ACC
Player	Position	Team
Trevor Lawrence	QB	First Team
Travis Etienne	RB	First Team
Tee Higgins	WR	First Team
Tremayne Anchrum	OT	First Team
John Simpson	OG	First Team
Isaiah Simmons	LB	First Team
A. J. Terrell	CB	First Team
Tanner Muse	S	First Team
Gage Cervenka	OG	Second Team
Sean Pollard	C	Second Team
Tyler Davis	DT	Second Team
Derion Kendrick	CB	Second Team
Jackson Carman	OT	Third Team
Xavier Thomas	DE	Third Team
Nyles Pinckney	DT	Third Team
K'Von Wallace	S	Third Team
Justyn Ross	WR	HM
Amari Rodgers	WR & AP	HM
Justin Foster	DE	HM
HM = Honorable mention. Source:

== Postseason ==
=== 2020 NFL draft ===
The 2020 NFL draft will be held on April 23–25, 2020 in Paradise, Nevada.

Tigers who were picked in the 2020 NFL Draft:

Round	Pick	Player	Position	NFL Club
1	8	Isaiah Simmons	OLB	Arizona Cardinals
1	16	A. J. Terrell	CB	Atlanta Falcons
2	33	Tee Higgins	WR	Cincinnati Bengals
3	100	Tanner Muse	S	Las Vegas Raiders
4	109	John Simpson	OG	Las Vegas Raiders
4	127	K'Von Wallace	S	Philadelphia Eagles
7	250	Tremayne Anchrum	OG	Los Angeles Rams
