= Xavier Thomas =

American football player (born 1999)

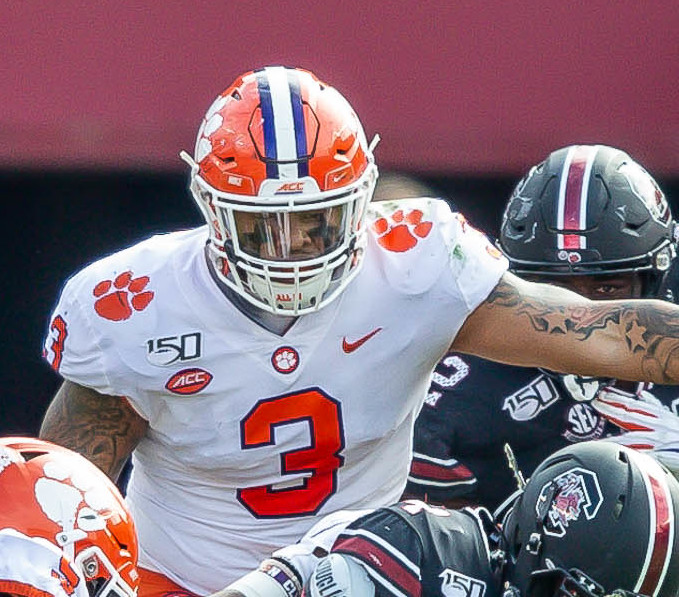
- Thomas with the Clemson Tigers in 2019

Colorado Stampede
- Position: Linebacker
- Roster status: Unsigned draft pick

Personal information
- Born: December 20, 1999 (age 26); Florence, South Carolina, U.S.
- Listed height: 6 ft 2 in (1.88 m)
- Listed weight: 250 lb (113 kg)

Career information
- High school: Wilson (Florence); IMG Academy (Bradenton, Florida)
- College: Clemson (2018–2023)
- NFL draft: 2024: 5th round, 138th overall pick

Career history
- Arizona Cardinals (2024–2025); Houston Texans (2025)*; San Francisco 49ers (2026)*; Colorado Stampede (2027-present)
- * Offseason or practice squad member only

Awards and highlights
- CFP national champion (2018); 2× Third-team All-ACC (2019, 2021)

Career NFL statistics as of 2024
- Tackles: 10
- Sacks: 2.5
- Forced fumbles: 1
- Stats at Pro Football Reference

Xavier Thomas (born December 20, 1999) is an American professional football linebacker. He played college football for the Clemson Tigers.

== Early life ==
After playing for three years in Florence, South Carolina at Wilson High School, Thomas played his senior season at IMG Academy in Florida.

== College career ==
After recording forty-three tackles, three and a half sacks, and two pass breakups in his freshman season, Thomas was named to USA Today's Freshman All-America Team. During the 2019 season, he earned Third Team All-Atlantic Coast Conference honors after posting 31 tackles, 8 tackles for loss and two sacks. Thomas contracted COVID-19 and strep throat in July 2020, and announced he would redshirt the 2020 season. However, after the NCAA declared that all players could participate in the season without losing a year of eligibility, Thomas decided to play, despite missing summer workouts. On October 31, 2020, Thomas was ejected for targeting Boston College quarterback Phil Jurkovec. He missed the first half of the following game against Notre Dame.

=== College statistics ===
Year	Team	Games	Tackles				
Year	Team	Games	Total	Solo	Ast	TFL	Sacks
2018	Clemson	14	33	18	15	8.5	3.5
2019	Clemson	12	27	10	17	8.0	1.5
2020	Clemson	5	6	4	2	4.0	3.5
2021	Clemson	11	21	12	9	6.5	4.5
2022	Clemson	3	4	2	2	2.0	2.0
2023	Clemson	12	25	16	9	4.0	3.0
Career		57	116	62	54	33	18

== Professional career ==
Pre-draft measurables
Height	Weight	Arm length	Hand span	Wingspan	40-yard dash	10-yard split	20-yard split	Vertical jump	Broad jump	Bench press
6 ft 2 1/4 in (1.89 m)	244 lb (111 kg)	32 7/8 in (0.84 m)	9 1/8 in (0.23 m)	6 ft 6 1/4 in (1.99 m)	4.56 s	1.55 s	2.69 s	32.5 in (0.83 m)	10 ft 0 in (3.05 m)	26 reps
All values from NFL Combine/Pro Day

=== Arizona Cardinals ===
Thomas was selected in the fifth round (138th overall) of the 2024 NFL draft by the Arizona Cardinals. He made his NFL debut in Week 1 of the 2024 season against the Buffalo Bills as the Cardinals lost 34-28. In Week 2, Thomas recorded his first NFL tackle in a 41-10 win against the Los Angeles Rams. In Week 9 against the Chicago Bears, he recorded three tackles and 1.5 sacks (the first of his career) in a 29-9 win for the Cardinals. In Week 10, he recorded one tackle, one sack, and the first forced fumble of his career in a 31-6 win against the New York Jets. He finished the season with 10 tackles, 2.5 sacks, a forced fumble, and a pass deflection in 14 games.

On November 28, 2025, Thomas was waived by the Cardinals.

=== Houston Texans ===
On December 3, 2025, Thomas signed with the Houston Texans' practice squad. On January 20, 2026, he signed a reserve/futures contract with Houston. On May 13, Thomas was waived by the Texans with an injury designation.

=== San Francisco 49ers ===
On August 12, 2026, Thomas signed a one-year contract with San Francisco 49ers. He was waived by San Francisco with an injury designation on August 22.

On September 11, 2026, Thomas was suspended three games by the NFL.

=== Colorado Stampede ===
On November 18, 2026, Thomas was selected with the second pick in the 2027 UFL Draft by the Colorado Stampede.
