= Joseph Ngata =

American football player (born 2001)

Profile
- Position: Wide receiver

Personal information
- Born: January 9, 2001 (age 25); Reno, Nevada, U.S.
- Listed height: 6 ft 3 in (1.91 m)
- Listed weight: 217 lb (98 kg)

Career information
- High school: Folsom (Folsom, California)
- College: Clemson (2019–2022)
- NFL draft: 2023: undrafted

Career history
- Philadelphia Eagles (2023–2024)*; Birmingham Stallions (2025)*; Calgary Stampeders (2025)*
- * Offseason or practice squad member only
- Stats at Pro Football Reference

Joseph Ngata (born January 9, 2001) is an American professional football wide receiver. He played college football at Clemson and was signed by the Eagles as an undrafted free agent in 2023.

== Early life ==
Ngata was born on January 9, 2001, in Reno, Nevada. He is of Cameroonian descent, with both his parents having been born there before moving to the United States. Both of his brothers also played football. He attended Folsom High School in California and was a highly recruited wide receiver, being ranked a five-star recruit by Rivals.com. He had a career total of 188 receptions for 3,682 yards and 55 touchdowns, helping lead his team to the state championship in consecutive years while being given area player of the year honors. Ngata was selected to the All-American Bowl and was ranked by Rivals.com as the 21st-best player nationally, the fifth-best wide receiver and the fourth-best player in the state. Out of numerous offers to play college football, he committed to the Clemson Tigers, being the first signee at the school from California since 1991.

== College career ==
As a true freshman at Clemson in 2019, Ngata played every game and helped them reach the national championship while recording 17 catches for 240 yards and three scores. He was named a starter in 2020 but became limited after suffering an injury in week two, finishing the season with just three starts in seven games and seven receptions for 83 yards with no touchdowns. He greatly improved as a junior in 2021, posting 23 receptions for 438 yards with one score despite playing in only eight games, averaging 19.0 yards per reception. He had two games that season with over 100 receiving yards. After having battled injuries in prior years, Ngata stayed healthy for the full 2022 season, starting all 14 games while having career highs with 41 receptions for 526 yards and two touchdowns, topped by an eight-catch 84-yard performance in the Orange Bowl to close out his college career. He was invited to the NFLPA Collegiate Bowl and, despite having one year of eligibility left, opted to declare for the NFL draft rather than return for another season. He finished his stint at Clemson with 88 catches for 1,287 yards and six touchdowns in 39 games played.

=== College statistics ===
Year	Team	GP	Receiving				Kick returns			
Year	Team	GP	Rec	Yds	Avg	TD	Ret	Yds	Avg	TD
2019	Clemson	15	17	240	14.1	3	14	325	23.2	0
2020	Clemson	7	7	83	11.9	0	0	0	0	0
2021	Clemson	9	23	438	19.0	1	0	0	0	0
2022	Clemson	14	41	526	12.8	2	0	0	0	0
Career		45	88	1,287	14.6	6	14	325	23.2	0

== Professional career ==
Pre-draft measurables
Height	Weight	Arm length	Hand span	40-yard dash	10-yard split	20-yard split	20-yard shuttle	Three-cone drill	Vertical jump	Broad jump	Bench press
6 ft 3 1/8 in (1.91 m)	217 lb (98 kg)	33 1/8 in (0.84 m)	10 1/4 in (0.26 m)	4.54 s	1.59 s	2.66 s	4.22 s	7.29 s	34.5 in (0.88 m)	10 ft 4 in (3.15 m)	15 reps

=== Philadelphia Eagles ===
Ngata was invited to the NFL Scouting Combine, but was not selected in the 2023 NFL draft. After the draft, he was signed by the Philadelphia Eagles as an undrafted free agent. He was waived on August 29, 2023, and re-signed to the practice squad. He signed a reserve/future contract on January 18, 2024. He was waived/injured on August 27, 2024. He was re-signed to the practice squad on January 10, 2025, but was released four days later.

=== Birmingham Stallions ===
On January 22, 2025, Ngata signed with the Birmingham Stallions of the United Football League (UFL). He was released on March 20, 2025.

=== Calgary Stampeders ===
Ngata signed with the Calgary Stampeders on May 1, 2025. However, he was released with the final training camp cuts on June 1, 2025.
