= Isaiah Simmons =

American football player (born 1998)

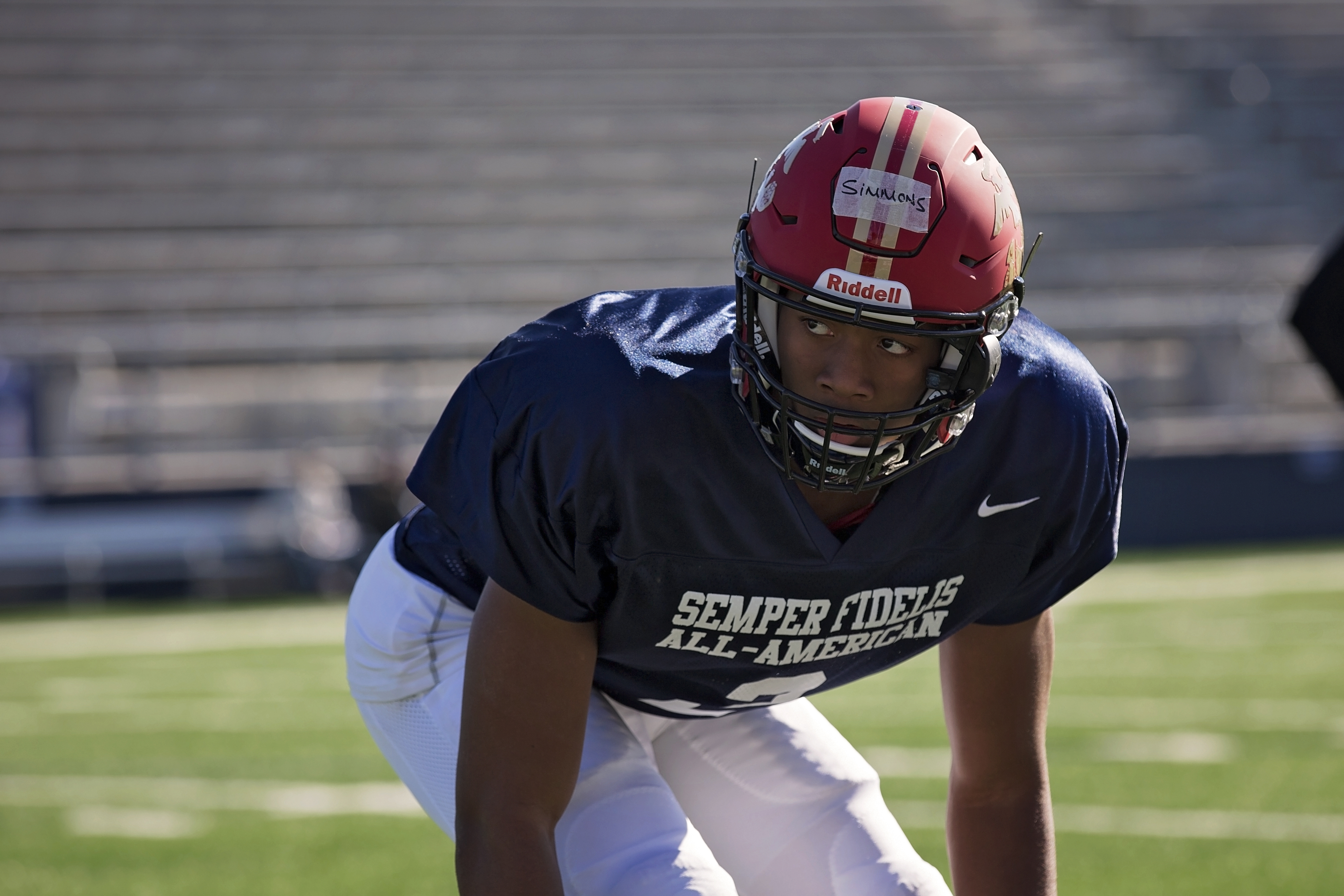
- Simmons with the Olathe North Eagles in 2016

No. 27 – Carolina Panthers
- Position: Linebacker
- Roster status: Injured reserve

Personal information
- Born: July 26, 1998 (age 28); Omaha, Nebraska, U.S.
- Listed height: 6 ft 4 in (1.93 m)
- Listed weight: 232 lb (105 kg)

Career information
- High school: Olathe North (Olathe, Kansas)
- College: Clemson (2016–2019)
- NFL draft: 2020: 1st round, 8th overall pick

Career history
- Arizona Cardinals (2020–2022); New York Giants (2023–2024); Green Bay Packers (2025)*; Carolina Panthers (2025–present)
- * Offseason or practice squad member only

Awards and highlights
- PFWA All-Rookie Team (2020); CFP national champion (2018); Butkus Award (college) (2019); Unanimous All-American (2019); ACC Defensive Player of the Year (2019); First-team All-ACC (2019)

Career NFL statistics as of Week 4, 2026
- Total tackles: 333
- Sacks: 8.5
- Forced fumbles: 9
- Fumble recoveries: 3
- Pass deflections: 21
- Interceptions: 5
- Defensive touchdowns: 2
- Stats at Pro Football Reference

Isaiah Simmons (born July 26, 1998) is an American professional football linebacker for the Carolina Panthers of the National Football League (NFL). He played college football for the Clemson Tigers and was selected by the Arizona Cardinals eighth overall in the 2020 NFL draft. While at Clemson, Simmons was noted for his positional versatility as he played linebacker, defensive end, cornerback and safety.

== Early life ==
Isaiah Simmons was born in Omaha, Nebraska on July 26, 1998. He later attended Olathe North High School in Olathe, Kansas, playing defensive back and wide receiver. He committed to Clemson University in February 2016.

== College career ==
Simmons redshirted his first year at Clemson in 2016. As a safety in 2017, he played in 14 games, recording 49 tackles and one sack. In 2018, he converted to linebacker. In a game against Louisville, he had a 27-yard pick six in a 77–16 victory. In 15 games, Simmons had 97 tackles, 1.5 sacks and one interception. He returned to Clemson in 2019 rather than enter the 2019 NFL draft. Simmons received the Butkus Award as the nation's best linebacker for his performance that year. After graduating in December 2019 with a degree in sports communication, Simmons announced that he would forgo his senior year by declaring for the 2020 NFL draft. During his time at Clemson, Simmons was noted for his positional versatility, taking snaps at linebacker, defensive end, cornerback, and safety.

== Professional career ==
Pre-draft measurables
Height	Weight	Arm length	Hand span	Wingspan	40-yard dash	10-yard split	20-yard split	Vertical jump	Broad jump	Bench press
6 ft 3 5/8 in (1.92 m)	238 lb (108 kg)	33 3/8 in (0.85 m)	9 5/8 in (0.24 m)	6 ft 9 7/8 in (2.08 m)	4.39 s	1.51 s	2.58 s	39.0 in (0.99 m)	11 ft 0 in (3.35 m)	20 reps
All values from NFL Combine, except bench from Pro Day

=== Arizona Cardinals ===
Simmons participated in the 2020 NFL Combine, leading all linebackers with a 4.39-second 40-yard dash. He was one of 58 players invited to the 2020 NFL draft, which was held virtually due to social distancing regulations arising from the COVID-19 pandemic, where he was selected by the Arizona Cardinals with the eighth overall pick.

Despite playing only five snaps in Week 7 against the Seattle Seahawks on Sunday Night Football, Simmons recorded his first career interception off Russell Wilson with a minute left in overtime, helping the Cardinals win 37–34. He was named to the PFWA All-Rookie Team.

Simmons entered the 2021 season as a starting inside linebacker. He started all 17 games, finishing third on the team with 105 tackles, 1.5 sacks, four forced fumbles, and seven passes defensed.

In Week 7 against the New Orleans Saints, Simmons recorded five tackles and returned an interception 56 yards for his first NFL touchdown in the second quarter in the 42–34 win. In the 2022 season, he finished with four sacks, 99 total tackles (68 solo), two interceptions, seven passes defended, two forced fumbles, and one fumble recovery in 17 games and 13 starts.

On May 1, 2023, the Cardinals declined the fifth-year option of Simmons' contract, making him a free agent in the 2024 offseason.

=== New York Giants ===
Simmons was traded to the New York Giants on August 24, 2023, in exchange for a seventh-round pick (No. 226) in the 2024 NFL draft.

During a Week 11 game against the Washington Commanders, Simmons intercepted a pass off of Sam Howell and returned it for a touchdown, sealing the game and resulting in a victory for the Giants. In the 2023 season, he finished with one sack, 50 total tackles (33 solo), one interception, three passes defended, one fumble recovery, and one forced fumble in 17 games and four starts.

On April 5, 2024, the Giants re-signed Simmons to a one-year, $2 million contract. On October 6, in a game against the Seattle Seahawks, Simmons blocked a potential game-tying field goal from Jason Myers, which was returned for a touchdown by Bryce Ford-Wheaton, as the Giants won 29-20. Simmons was named NFC Special Teams Player of the Week for his performance.

=== Green Bay Packers ===
On April 29, 2025, Simmons signed with the Green Bay Packers. He was released on August 26 by the Packers as a part of final roster cuts.

=== Carolina Panthers ===
On November 25, 2025, Simmons signed with the Carolina Panthers' practice squad. Simmons was signed to the active roster following Trevin Wallace's move to injured reserve on December 27. In Carolina's Wild Card playoff matchup against the Los Angeles Rams, Simmons recorded a blocked punt late in the fourth quarter that set up an eventual lead-changing touchdown; however, the Panthers would go on to lose the game, 34-31.

On March 10, 2026, Simmons re-signed with the Panthers. Simmons was releaesed by Carolina on August 30 as a part of final roster cuts; he was re–signed to the team's practice squad the next day. On September 23, Simmons was promoted to the active roster.

== Career statistics ==
=== NFL ===
Year	Team	GP	GS	Tackles					Interceptions				Fumbles	
Year	Team	GP	GS	Solo	Ast	Tot	Loss	Sk	Int	Yds	TD	PD	FF	FR
2020	ARZ	16	7	43	11	54	4.0	2.0	1	12	0	2	1	1
2021	ARZ	17	17	70	35	105	4.0	1.5	1	0	0	7	4	0
2022	ARZ	17	13	68	31	99	5.0	4.0	2	61	1	7	2	1
2023	NYG	17	4	33	17	50	2.0	1.0	1	54	1	3	1	1
2024	NYG	17	1	12	9	21	0.0	0.0	0	0	0	2	1	0
2025	CAR	5	1	2	1	1	0.0	0.0	0	0	0	0	0	0
2026	CAR	4	0	1	1	2	0.0	0.0	0	0	0	0	0	0
Career		93	42	105	228	333	15.0	8.5	5	127	2	21	9	3

=== College ===
Year	Team	Class	GP	Tackles					Interceptions					Fumbles	
Year	Team	Class	GP	Solo	Ast	Tot	Loss	Sk	Int	Yds	Avg	TD	PD	FF	FR
2016	Clemson	FR	1	1	0	1	0.0	0.0	0	0	0.0	0	0	0	0
2017	Clemson	FR	13	27	18	45	3.0	1.0	0	0	0.0	0	6	1	0
2018	Clemson	SO	15	53	35	88	9.0	2.0	1	27	27.0	1	6	3	0
2019	Clemson	JR	15	67	37	104	16.5	8.0	3	42	14.0	0	8	2	1
Career			44	148	90	238	28.5	11.0	4	69	17.3	1	20	6	1
