= A. J. Terrell =

American football player (born 1998)

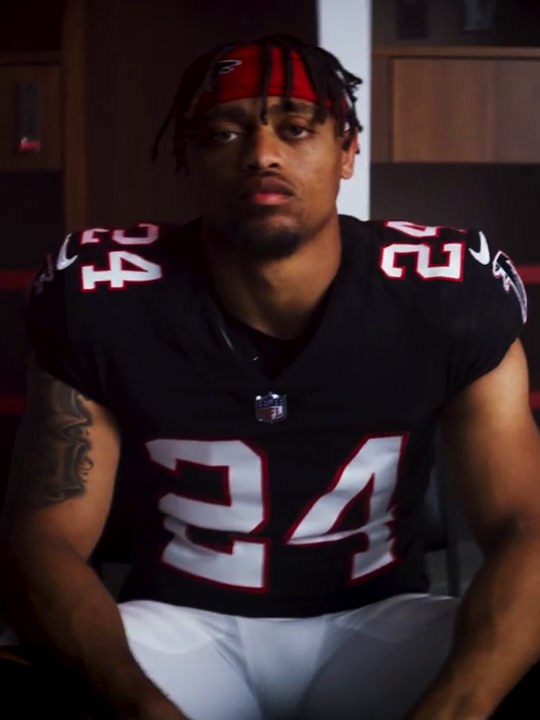
- Terrell with the Atlanta Falcons in 2022

No. 24 – Atlanta Falcons
- Position: Cornerback
- Roster status: Active

Personal information
- Born: September 23, 1998 (age 28); Rochester, New York, U.S.
- Listed height: 6 ft 1 in (1.85 m)
- Listed weight: 200 lb (91 kg)

Career information
- High school: Westlake (Atlanta, Georgia)
- College: Clemson (2017–2019)
- NFL draft: 2020: 1st round, 16th overall pick

Career history
- Atlanta Falcons (2020–present)

Awards and highlights
- Second-team All-Pro (2021); CFP national champion (2018); First-team All-ACC (2019); Third-team All-ACC (2018)

Career NFL statistics as of 2025
- Total tackles: 381
- Sacks: 1
- Forced fumbles: 6
- Fumble recoveries: 1
- Pass deflections: 61
- Interceptions: 6
- Stats at Pro Football Reference

Aundell Terrell Jr. (born September 23, 1998) is an American professional football cornerback for the Atlanta Falcons of the National Football League (NFL). He played college football for the Clemson Tigers and was selected by the Falcons in the first round of the 2020 NFL draft.

== Early life ==
Terrell attended Westlake High School in Atlanta, Georgia. He played cornerback and wide receiver in high school. A five-star recruit, he played in the 2017 Under Armour All-America Game. He committed to Clemson University to play college football.

== College career ==
As a true freshman at Clemson in 2017, Terrell played in 14 games, recording 15 tackles and an interception. As a sophomore in 2018, he started all 15 games and had 53 tackles, three interceptions and a touchdown. In the 2019 College Football Playoff National Championship, he returned an interception 44 yards for a touchdown against Alabama quarterback, Tua Tagovailoa. Terrell returned as a starter his junior year in 2019. Following a junior season where he was named to the first-team All-Atlantic Coast Conference, Terrell announced that he would forgo his senior season and declared for the 2020 NFL draft.

== Professional career ==
=== Pre-draft ===
Prior to the NFL Scouting Combine, Kevin Hanson of Sports Illustrated ranked Terrell as the sixth best cornerback prospect in the draft.

External videos
- Draft Prospects: A.J. Terrell CB Clemson
- A.J. Terrell runs 4.42s 40-yard dash
- A.J. Terrell's 2020 NFL Combine Workout

"Terrell is a tall, slender cornerback prospect with a strong resume in a variety of coverages and techniques. In press coverage, he uses an effective one-hand jam before turning and opening up. He can carry vertical routes with his speed, but he is a little bit sticky when he's forced to gear down and come back downhill."

— Daniel Jeremiah (NFL.com analyst)

Following the pre-draft process, NFL analyst Michael Renner of Pro Football Focus and Williams Ragatz of Sports Illustrated ranked Terrell the fifth best cornerback. NFL analyst Daniel Jeremiah ranked him fourth amongst all cornerbacks (32nd overall) in the 2020 NFL Draft. Dane Brugler of the Athletic listed Terrell as the sixth best cornerback prospect. NFL draft analyst Bucky Brooks ranked Terrell the third best cornerback prospect. Pro Football Focus and ESPN analyst Mel Kiper Jr. ranked him as the eighth best cornerback available in the draft. Terrell was able to dramatically increase his draft stock throughout the pre-draft process and was projected to be a first-round pick by the majority of NFL draft analysts.

"He's handled himself like a pro since the day he got here. He's got unique intangibles to go along with a rare skill set for his position."

— Dabo Swinney (Clemson Head coach)

Pre-draft measurables
Height	Weight	Arm length	Hand span	Wingspan	40-yard dash	10-yard split	20-yard split	20-yard shuttle	Three-cone drill	Vertical jump	Broad jump	Bench press
6 ft 1 1/8 in (1.86 m)	195 lb (88 kg)	31 1/4 in (0.79 m)	9 in (0.23 m)	6 ft 3 5/8 in (1.92 m)	4.42 s	1.49 s	2.58 s	4.27 s	7.12 s	34.5 in (0.88 m)	10 ft 9 in (3.28 m)	15 reps
All values from NFL Combine/Pro Day

=== 2020 ===
The Atlanta Falcons selected Terrell in the first round (16th overall) of the 2020 NFL Draft. He was the third cornerback drafted in 2020, after Jeff Okudah (third overall) and C. J. Henderson (ninth overall).

"This guy is fast, athletic and has the ability to play the ball in the air. We have big expectations for (A.J.) to come in and help continue to build this defense. (Dabo) compared Terrell to Grady Jarrett, they could literally be roommates. They're guys that are dedicated and focused and want to be the best. They have high expectations of themselves not only on the field but off. We're really encouraged and excited that we have a player at this position that is well rounded."

— Thomas Dimitroff (Atlanta Falcons'GM)

External videos
- Falcons select A.J. Terrell No. 16 overall
- 2020 Draft War Room: Falcons select A.J. Terrell
- A.J. Terrell's Post-draft interview

"Based on what we've seen and how he plays, we think he's a good fit for how we want to play. He'll be an outside corner to start because that's where he has the most experience. He's long, tall, fast and can play down by the line of scrimmage. I think it's an ideal space to come into as a corner and be part of the brotherhood. What better way to prepare than to go up against Matt Ryan and Julio Jones in practice. What I love about A.J. is the he's a hell of a competitor, loves the challenge and the tape shows this."

— Dan Quinn (Falcons' head coach)

On July 20, 2020, the Falcons signed Terrell to a fully–guaranteed four–year, $14.30 million contract that includes an initial signing bonus of $7.96 million.

Throughout training camp, Terrell competed against Darqueze Dennard and Isaiah Oliver to be a starting cornerback. Head coach Dan Quinn named Terrell the No. 1 starting cornerback to begin the season and paired him with Isaiah Oliver.

On September 13, 2020, Terrell made his professional regular season debut and earned his first career start during the Atlanta Falcons' home-opener against the Seattle Seahawks and made six combined tackles (five solo) as they lost 25–38. On September 26, 2020, the Atlanta Falcons placed Terrell on the reserve/COVID-19 list. On October 8, 2020, the Falcons activated him from the COVID-19/reserve list and placed on the active roster after he missed two games (Weeks 3–4). On October 11, 2020, the Falcons announced their decision to fire head coach Dan Quinn after they fell to a 0–5 record and chose to appoint defensive coordinator Raheem Morris to interim head coach. On October 18, 2020, Terrell made six combined tackles (five solo), a pass deflection, and made his first career interception on a pass thrown by Kirk Cousins to wide receiver Justin Jefferson during the 40–23 win at the Minnesota Vikings. In Week 14, Terrell had a career-high 13 solo tackles and broke up a pass during a 17–20 loss at the Los Angeles Chargers. He finished his rookie season with a total of 74 combined tackles (61 solo), seven pass deflections, and one interception in 14 games and 14 starts. He received an overall grade of 60.8 as a rookie from Pro Football Focus, which was ranked 52nd out of 121 qualifying cornerbacks.

=== 2021 ===
On January 15, 2021, the Atlanta Falcons announced the hiring of Tennessee Titans' offensive coordinator Arthur Smith as their new head coach. He entered training camp slated as the de facto No. 1 starting cornerback and teamed with Isaiah Oliver, Fabian Moreau, and Kendall Sheffield under defensive coordinator Dean Pees. He began the season as the No. 1 starting cornerback and was paired with Fabian Moreau.

On September 19, 2021, Terrell recorded two solo tackles and made two pass deflections before exiting in the third quarter of a 25–48 loss at the Tampa Bay Buccaneers after suffering a concussion while breaking up a pass by Tom Brady to wide receiver Antonio Brown. He remained inactive in concussion protocol for the Falcons' 17–14 win at the New York Giants in Week 3. In Week 11, Terrell collected a season-high nine combined tackles (four solo), made a pass deflection, and intercepted a pass by Mac Jones to tight end Jonnu Smith as they lost 0–25 to the New England Patriots. In Week 14, he made four combined tackles (three solo), tied his season-high of three pass deflections, and intercepted a pass by P. J. Walker to Robbie Anderson during a 29–21 win at the Carolina Panthers. On January 2, 2022, Terrell made seven combined tackles (six solo), one pass deflection, had his first career sack, and set a career-high with his third interception of the season on a pass by Josh Allen to Cole Beasley during a 15–29 loss at the Buffalo Bills. He made his first career sack on wide receiver Stefon Diggs for a two–yard loss in the second quarter. He finished the season with a total of 81 combined tackles (52 solo), 16 pass deflections, and three interceptions in 16 games and 16 starts. He was named second-team All-Pro for his performance in 2021. He received an overall grade of 82.7 from Pro Football Focus, which ranked second among all qualifying cornerbacks in 2021.

=== 2022 ===
Head coach Arthur Smith listed Terrell the No. 1 starting cornerback for the third consecutive season and paired him with Casey Hayward. In Week 2, he collected a season-high nine combined tackles (six solo) and broke up a pass during a 27–31 loss at the Los Angeles Rams. The following week, Terrell had six solo tackles and season-high three passes defended in the Falcons' 27–23 win at the Seattle Seahawks. In Week 6, Terrell recorded four combined tackles (two solo), broke up a pass, forced a fumble, and had his first career fumble recovery during a 28–14 win against the San Francisco 49ers. On October 23, 2022, he made one solo tackle before exiting during the second quarter of a 17–35 loss at the Cincinnati Bengals after injuring his hamstring. He was subsequently sidelined for the next three games (Weeks 8–10) due to his hamstring injury. He finished the 2022 NFL season with 47 combined tackles (36 solo), nine pass deflections, a forced fumble, and a fumble recovery in 14 games and 14 starts. He earned an overall grade of 63.9 from Pro Football Focus in 2022, which ranked 52nd out of 118 qualifying cornerbacks.

=== 2023 ===
On January 27, 2023, the Falcons hired former New Orleans Saints' defensive line coach Ryan Nielsen as their defensive coordinator following the retirement of Dean Pees. On April 28, 2013, the Atlanta Falcons exercised the fully–guaranteed fifth–year option on Terrell's rookie contract for one–year, $12.34 million. He entered training camp as the No. 1 cornerback and was expected to play alongside Jeff Okudah. Head coach Arthur Smith listed Terrell as the No. 1 starting cornerback to start the season and paired him with Tre Flowers.

On October 22, 2023, he collected a season-high five combined tackles (three solo) and tied his season-high of two pass deflections during a 16–13 win at the Tampa Bay Buccaneers. In Week 16, Terrell recorded a season-high four solo tackles (five combined) as the Falcons defeated the Indianapolis Colts 29–10. He started in all 17 games during the 2023 NFL season for the first time in his career and had a total of 45 combined tackles (34 solo) and 11 pass deflections. He received an overall grade of 74.6 from Pro Football Focus in 2023, which ranked 22nd among 127 cornerbacks. His coverage grade from PFF was also 74.6, ranking 24th out of 127.

=== 2024 ===
On August 22, 2024, the Atlanta Falcons signed Terrell to a four–year, $81.00 million contract extension that includes $65.80 million guaranteed, $42.34 million guaranteed upon signing, and an initial signing bonus of $25.00 million.

Former Los Angeles Rams' defensive coordinator Raheem Morris became the Atlanta Falcons new head coach after Arthur Smith was fired after they Falcons finished the 2023 NFL season with a 7–10 record and did not qualify for the playoffs for the third consecutive season. The Falcons' new defensive coordinator, Jimmy Lake retained Terrell as the No. 1 starting cornerback to begin the season and played alongside Mike Hughes, Kevin King, and Dee Alford following the departure of Casey Hayward.

In Week 2, Terrell racked up a season-high seven solo tackles during a 22–21 win at the Philadelphia Eagles. On October 13, 2024, he recorded three combined tackles (two solo), broke up a pass, and intercepted a pass thrown by Andy Dalton to tight end Ian Thomas during a 38–20 win at the Carolina Panthers. In Week 8, Terrell recorded seven combined tackles (six solo), deflected a pass, and intercepted a pass by Baker Mayfield to wide receiver Jalen McMillan as the Falcons win 38–26 at the Tampa Bay Buccaneers. The following week, he collected a season-high nine combined tackles (five solo) as the Falcons defeated the Dallas Cowboys 27–21 in Week 9. He started in all 17 games during the 2024 NFL season and recorded 66 combined tackles (50 solo), six pass deflections, and two interceptions. His overall grade of 69.4 from Pro Football Focus ranked 55th among 223 qualifying cornerbacks in 2024.

=== 2026 ===
Terrell suffered a groin injury in Week 2 and missed four games while on injured reserve. He was activated on October 24, 2026.

== Career statistics ==
=== NFL ===
Legend
**Bold**	Career high

Year	Team	GP	GS	Tackles					Interceptions				Fumbles	
Year	Team	GP	GS	Solo	Ast	Tot	TFL	Sk	Int	Yds	TD	PD	FF	FR
2020	ATL	14	14	**61**	13	74	3	0.0	1	0	0	7	**3**	0
2021	ATL	16	16	52	**29**	**81**	3	**1.0**	**3**	**42**	0	**16**	1	0
2022	ATL	14	14	36	11	47	1	0.0	0	0	0	9	0	**1**
2023	ATL	17	17	34	11	45	**4**	0.0	0	0	0	11	0	0
2024	ATL	17	17	50	16	66	2	0.0	2	1	0	6	0	0
2025	ATL	15	15	49	19	68	1	0.0	0	0	0	12	2	0
Career		93	93	282	99	381	14	1.0	6	43	0	61	6	1

=== College ===
Year	Team	Class	GP	Tackles					Interceptions					Fumbles	
Year	Team	Class	GP	Solo	Ast	Tot	Loss	Sk	Int	Yds	Avg	TD	PD	FF	FR
2017	Clemson	FR	10	10	4	14	1.0	0.0	1	0	0.0	0	7	0	0
2018	Clemson	SO	14	40	13	53	2.0	0.0	3	95	31.7	1	3	2	0
2019	Clemson	JR	14	24	10	34	0.5	0.5	2	65	32.5	0	3	0	0
Career			38	74	27	101	3.5	0.5	6	160	26.7	1	13	2	0

== Personal life ==
Aundell Terrell Jr. was the second of four children born to Aundell Terrell Sr. and his wife Aliya. The family moved from Rochester, New York, to Atlanta, Georgia, in 2001. Terrell Jr.'s son, Aundell III, was born in 2019.

His younger brother, Avieon, also plays for the Atlanta Falcons.
