= Tremayne Anchrum =

American football player (born 1998)

Tremayne Anchrum Jr.
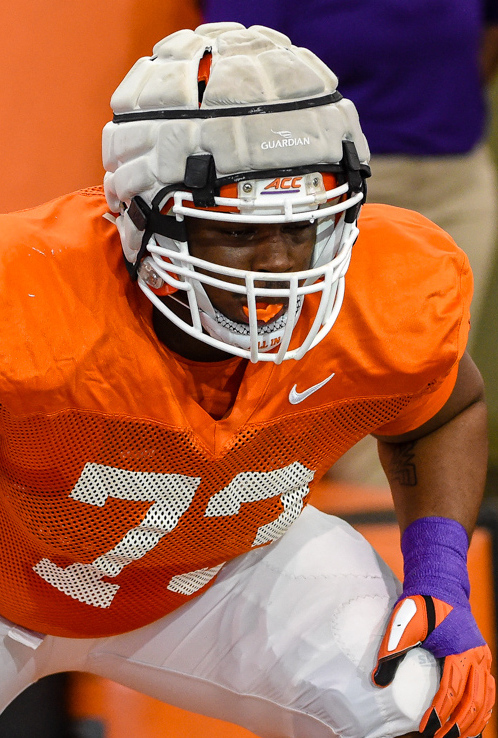
- Anchrum with the Clemson Tigers in 2019

Profile
- Position: Guard

Personal information
- Born: June 24, 1998 (age 28); Powder Springs, Georgia, U.S.
- Listed height: 6 ft 2 in (1.88 m)
- Listed weight: 315 lb (143 kg)

Career information
- High school: McEachern (Powder Springs)
- College: Clemson (2016–2019)
- NFL draft: 2020: 7th round, 250th overall pick

Career history
- Los Angeles Rams (2020–2023); Seattle Seahawks (2024)*; New Orleans Saints (2024)*; Houston Texans (2024)*; Kansas City Chiefs (2025)*; Jacksonville Jaguars (2025)*; Dallas Renegades (2026)
- * Offseason or practice squad member only

Awards and highlights
- Super Bowl champion (LVI); 2× CFP national champion (2016, 2018)

Career NFL statistics
- Games played: 31
- Games started: 1
- Stats at Pro Football Reference

Tremayne Anchrum Jr. (born June 24, 1998) is an American professional football guard. He played college football for the Clemson Tigers, and has previously played in the NFL for the Los Angeles Rams, with whom he won Super Bowl LVI.

== Early life ==
Anchrum played football and basketball at McEachern High School in Powder Springs, Georgia. He committed to Clemson on November 19, 2015, choosing the Tigers over Nebraska and Colorado.

== College career ==
After his senior season at Clemson, Anchrum played in the 2020 Senior Bowl.

== Professional career ==
Pre-draft measurables
| Height | Weight | Arm length | Hand span | Wingspan | 40-yard dash | 10-yard split | 20-yard split | Vertical jump | Broad jump | Bench press |
|---|---|---|---|---|---|---|---|---|---|---|
| 6 ft 1 7/8 in (1.88 m) | 314 lb (142 kg) | 33 5/8 in (0.85 m) | 9 5/8 in (0.24 m) | 6 ft 8 1/2 in (2.04 m) | 5.21 s | 1.85 s | 3.05 s | 24.5 in (0.62 m) | 8 ft 8 in (2.64 m) | 26 reps |
All values from NFL Combine

=== Los Angeles Rams ===
Anchrum was selected by the Los Angeles Rams in the seventh round (250th overall) of the 2020 NFL draft.

On September 2, 2021, Anchrum was placed on injured reserve. He was activated on October 12. Anchrum was part of the Rams team that won Super Bowl LVI over the Cincinnati Bengals.

On September 20, 2022, Anchrum was placed on injured reserve after suffering a fractured fibula in Week 2.

=== Seattle Seahawks ===
On March 18, 2024, Anchrum signed with the Seattle Seahawks. On July 24, Anchrum was released by Seattle.

=== New Orleans Saints ===
On July 28, 2024, Anchrum signed with the New Orleans Saints. He was released by New Orleans on August 27.

=== Houston Texans ===
On November 5, 2024, Anchrum was signed to the Houston Texans practice squad. He signed a reserve/future contract with Houston on January 21, 2025.

On April 21, 2025, Anchrum was released by the Texans.

=== Kansas City Chiefs ===
On May 16, 2025, Anchrum signed with the Kansas City Chiefs. He was released on June 20.

=== Jacksonville Jaguars ===
On August 4, 2025, the Jacksonville Jaguars signed Anchrum. He was released on August 26 as part of final roster cuts.

=== Dallas Renegades ===
On January 13, 2026, Anchrum was selected by the Dallas Renegades in the 2026 UFL Draft.

== Personal life ==
His father Tremayne Anchrum Sr. played basketball for USC from 1992 to 1996.
