= 2019 College Football Playoff National Championship =

College football championship game

2019 College Football Playoff National Championship presented by AT&T
- 5th College Football Playoff National Championship
Clemson Tigers	Alabama Crimson Tide
(14–0)	(14–0)
ACC	SEC
44	16
Head coach: Dabo Swinney	Head coach: Nick Saban
AP / Coaches / CFP; 2 / 2 / 2	AP / Coaches / CFP; 1 / 1 / 1
	1	2	3	4	Total
Clemson	14	17	13	0	44
Alabama	13	3	0	0	16
- Date: January 7, 2019
- Season: 2018
- Stadium: Levi's Stadium
- Location: Santa Clara, California
- MVP: Trevor Lawrence (Clemson, QB); Trayvon Mullen (Clemson, CB)
- Favorite: Alabama by 5
- National anthem: Andy Grammer
- Referee: Mike Cannon (Big Ten)
- Halftime show: Clemson University Tiger Band; Million Dollar Band
- Attendance: 74,814

United States TV coverage
- Network: ESPN and ESPN Radio
- Announcers: Chris Fowler (play-by-play); Kirk Herbstreit (analyst); Tom Rinaldi and Maria Taylor (sideline) (ESPN); Sean McDonough, Todd Blackledge, Holly Rowe and Ian Fitzsimmons (ESPN Radio)
- Nielsen ratings: 14.6 (25.28 million viewers)

International TV coverage
- Network: ESPN Deportes; ESPN Deportes Radio
- Announcers: Lalo Varela and Pablo Viruega (ESPN Deportes); Kenneth Garay and Alex Pombo (ESPN Deportes Radio)

The 2019 College Football Playoff National Championship was a college football bowl game played on January 7, 2019, at Levi's Stadium in Santa Clara, California. The fifth College Football Playoff National Championship, the game determined a national champion in the NCAA Division I Football Bowl Subdivision for the 2018 season. It was the final game of the 2018-19 College Football Playoff (CFP) and, aside from any all-star games that followed, was the culminating game of the 2018–19 bowl season. Sponsored by telecommunications company AT&T, the game was officially known as the 2019 College Football Playoff National Championship presented by AT&T.

The Clemson Tigers upset the defending national champion Alabama Crimson Tide by a score of 44–16 to win the championship with an undefeated 15–0 record. Clemson became the first such undefeated team in the CFP era to win the title, and the first (Note: At the FBS, Division I-A, or their predecessors level of college football.) to finish 15–0 in a single season since the 1897 Penn Quakers. The 28-point loss was the largest margin of defeat for Alabama during the Nick Saban era (2007–2023) and since Alabama's 31-point loss in the 1998 Music City Bowl.

== Background ==
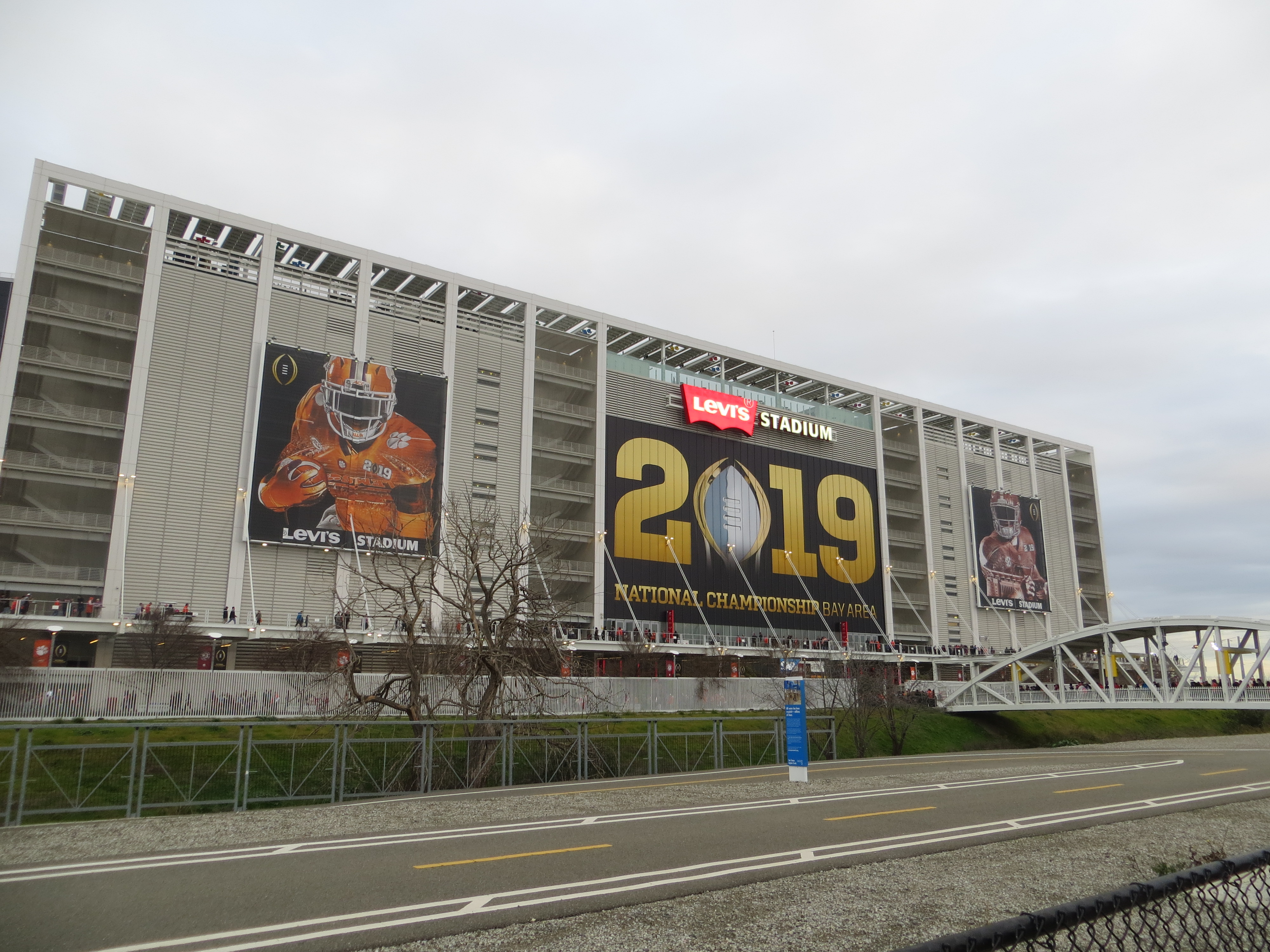
Levi's Stadium prior to the 2019 College Football Playoff National Championship

Levi's Stadium in Santa Clara, California, was announced as the host site for the fifth College Football Playoff National Championship on November 4, 2015. Atlanta was awarded the 2018 championship game while New Orleans was awarded the 2020 game. The three game sites were chosen out of nine bids, with bids by Houston, South Florida, Charlotte, Detroit, Minnesota, and San Antonio not selected.

== Teams ==
Alabama held a 14–4 series lead over Clemson in prior meetings between the two teams. They had met in the postseason in each of the prior three seasons: the 2016 College Football Playoff National Championship, won by Alabama (45–40); the 2017 College Football Playoff National Championship, won by Clemson (35–31); and the 2018 Sugar Bowl playoff semifinal game, won by Alabama (24–6).

This was the first time under the College Football Playoff format (initiated in 2014) that an undefeated team won the championship, as both teams came into the game 14–0.

=== Clemson Tigers ===
Clemson defeated the Pittsburgh Panthers in the 2018 ACC Championship Game on December 1, then received their bid to the Cotton Bowl with the release of final CFP rankings on December 2. Clemson defeated the Notre Dame Fighting Irish in the Cotton Bowl Classic on December 29 to advance to the championship game. The Tigers entered the championship game with a 14–0 record. On January 3, it was confirmed that three Clemson players, including starting defensive lineman Dexter Lawrence, would remain suspended from playing by the NCAA, due to drug testing in advance of the Cotton Bowl Classic that showed "trace amounts of a banned substance", which was identified as ostarine.

=== Alabama Crimson Tide ===
Alabama defeated the Georgia Bulldogs in the 2018 SEC Championship Game on December 1, then received their bid to the Orange Bowl with the release of final CFP rankings on December 2. Alabama defeated the Oklahoma Sooners in the Orange Bowl on December 29 to advance to the championship game. The Crimson Tide also entered the championship game with a 14–0 record. On December 27, in advance of the Orange Bowl, three Alabama players, including starting offensive lineman Deonte Brown, were suspended for the remainder of the season, in what was initially described as an unspecified violation of team rules, then later characterized as NCAA violations.

== Starting lineups ==
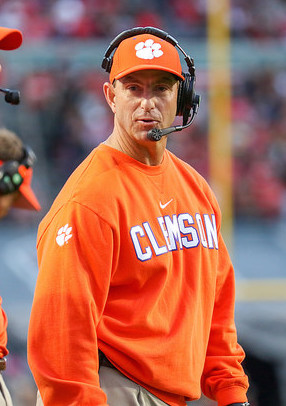
Clemson head coach Dabo Swinney

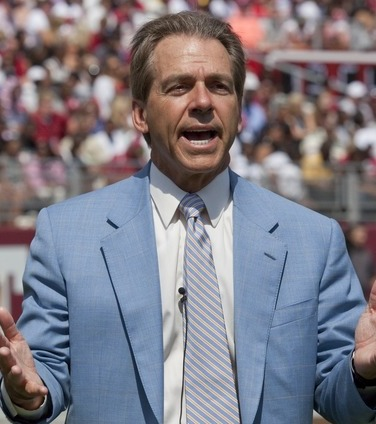
Alabama head coach Nick Saban

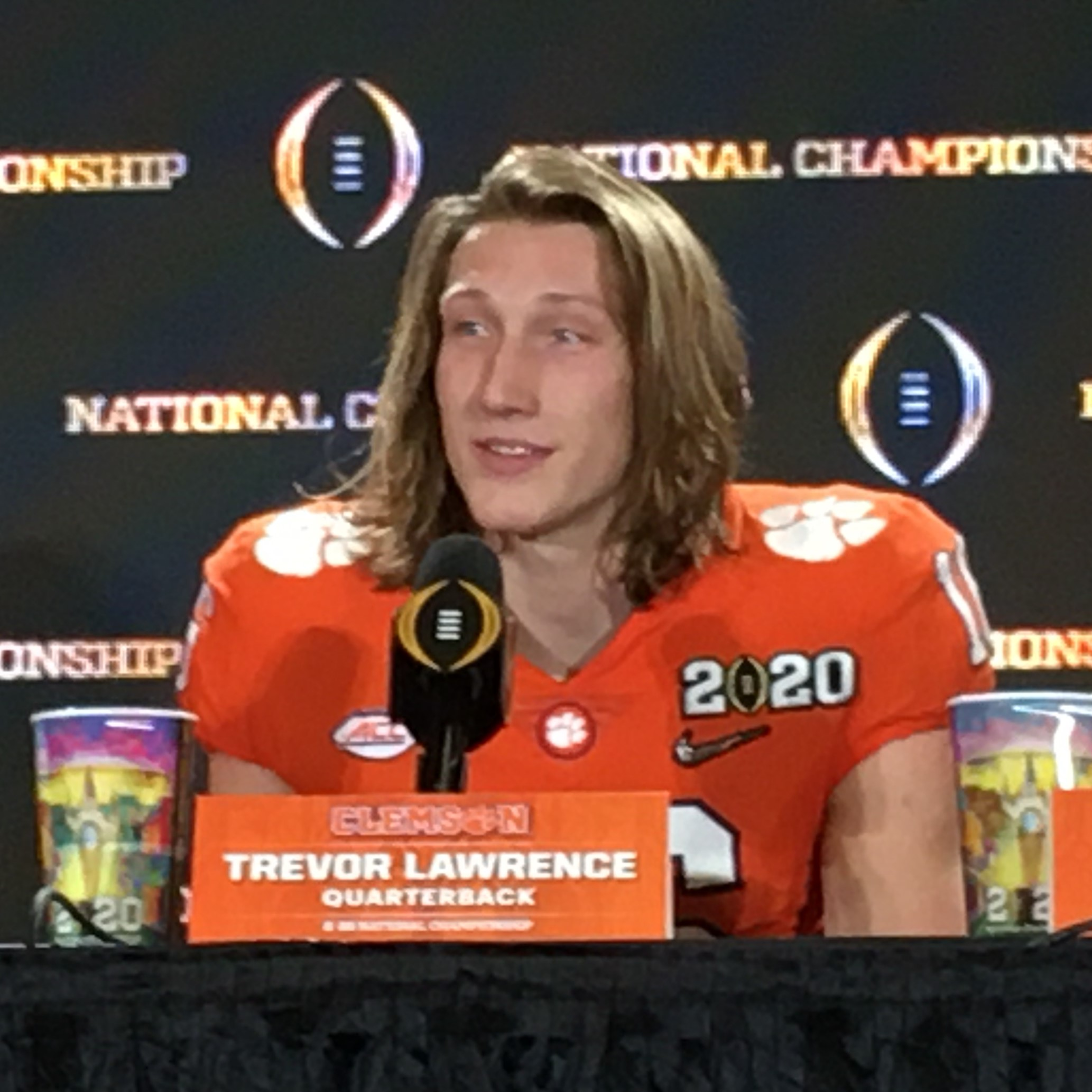
Clemson starting quarterback Trevor Lawrence (shown at 2020 College Football Playoff National Championship postgame)

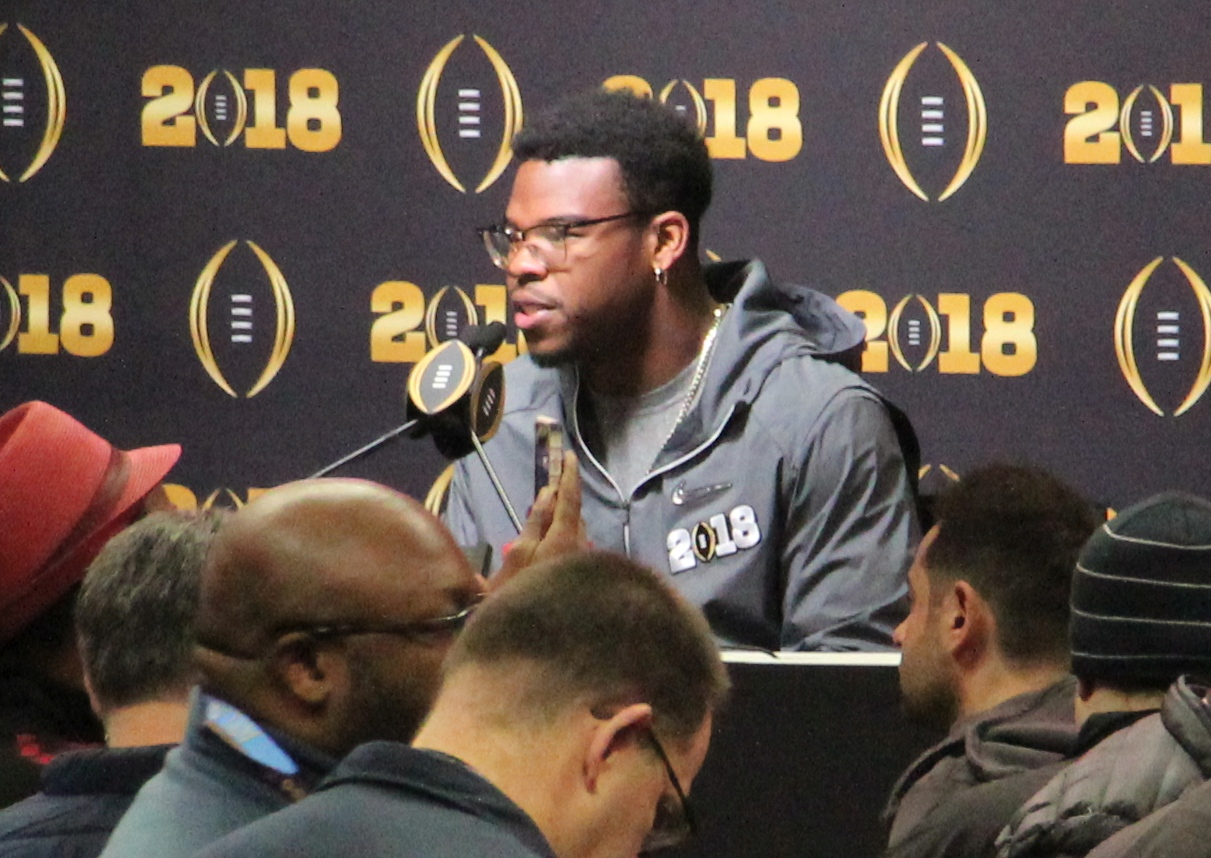
Alabama starting running back Damien Harris

Clemson	Position		Alabama
Offense
Tee Higgins 2	WR		Henry Ruggs III 1
Hunter Renfrow 5	WR		DeVonta Smith 1
† Mitch Hyatt	LT		† Jonah Williams 1
John Simpson 4	LG		Lester Cotton
Justin Falcinelli	C		Ross Pierschbacher 5
Gage Cervenka	RG		Alex Leatherwood 1
Tremayne Anchrum 7	RT		Jedrick Wills Jr. 1
Garrett Williams	TE		Irv Smith Jr. 2
Amari Rodgers 3	WR		† Jerry Jeudy 1
Trevor Lawrence 1	QB		† Tua Tagovailoa 1
Travis Etienne 1	RB		Damien Harris 3
Defense
† Clelin Ferrell 1	DE		Isaiah Buggs 6
† Christian Wilkins 1	DT	NG	† Quinnen Williams 1
Albert Huggins	DT	DE	Raekwon Davis 2
Austin Bryant 4	DE	STAR	Shyheim Carter
Kendall Joseph	WLB		Dylan Moses
Tre Lamar	MLB		Mack Wilson 5
Isaiah Simmons 1	SLB		Anfernee Jennings 3
A. J. Terrell 1	CB		Saivion Smith
Trayvon Mullen 2	CB		Patrick Surtain II 1
K'Von Wallace 4	SS		Xavier McKinney 2
Tanner Muse 3	FS		† Deionte Thompson 5
† 2018 All-American
Selected in an NFL Draft (number corresponds to draft round)

== Game summary ==
After winning the coin toss, Alabama elected to defer, giving Clemson the ball to start the game. The Tigers' opening drive resulted in a three-and-out, and Alabama took over on their own 21-yard-line following a punt. However, three plays later, the scoring was opened by Clemson cornerback A. J. Terrell, who intercepted a Tua Tagovailoa pass and returned it 44 yards for a touchdown. Alabama responded quickly, as Tagovailoa made up for the interception three plays later by finding Jerry Jeudy downfield for a 62-yard score. On their ensuing drive, Clemson continued the offensive trend of the first quarter with a 62-yard pass of their own, from Trevor Lawrence to Tee Higgins, which set up a 17-yard touchdown rush by Travis Etienne on the next play. Now trailing 14–7, Alabama marched downfield on their next drive, covering 75 yards in ten plays, to score a touchdown with an opportunity to tie the game. However, Alabama freshman placekicker Joseph Bulovas missed the extra point, hitting the right upright; this was his sixth missed extra point of the season and left Clemson ahead by one, 14–13. Clemson's ensuing drive resulted in another three-and-out; they punted to Alabama, who made it to the Clemson 3-yard-line when the first quarter ended.

The second quarter began with Clemson holding a one-point lead, although this would not last for long. Two plays into the quarter, Bulovas converted a 25-yard field goal to put Alabama in front by two points, 16–14. Clemson would soon recapture the lead, as Lawrence led the Tigers' offense down the field in six plays; the drive was capped by a one-yard touchdown rush by Travis Etienne. With Clemson lead at 21–16, Alabama began their next drive. The Clemson defense would make another important play, as Tagovailoa threw his second interception of the game and only his sixth all season. Clemson then capitalized with a five-yard pass from Lawrence to Etienne to push the lead to 12 points, 28–16. On what would be their last drive of the half, Alabama punted on 4th-and-17, giving Clemson the ball on their own 21-yard-line. With just over two minutes on the clock, Clemson drove down the field and converted a 36-yard field goal that put the lead at 31–16 and gave the Tide the ball back with 45 seconds. After an incomplete pass and a six-yard rush, Alabama head coach Nick Saban elected to let the clock expire and head to halftime trailing by fifteen.

On Alabama's first drive of the second half, they gained 53 yards on 12 plays before losing two yards on a fake field goal, turning the ball over on downs and giving the Tigers the football on their own 24-yard-line. Clemson took advantage of the Tide's mistake, scoring on a 74-yard Trevor Lawrence pass to Justyn Ross. Greg Huegel's extra point attempt hit the left upright, leaving the score at 37–16; it was only his second missed extra point of the season. Alabama's next drive spanned 59 yards before they failed to convert a 4th-and-4 on Clemson's 14-yard-line, giving the Tigers the ball with just under six minutes to play in the third quarter. Clemson took advantage, driving 89 yards for a touchdown with a five-yard touchdown catch by Tee Higgins; the successful extra point pushed their lead to 44–16. Alabama's 28-point deficit was the largest in any game under Saban, their coach since 2007. The Tide began their third drive of the second half on their 25-yard-line following a touchback.

Following a 48-yard pass from Tagovailoa to Jeudy on the final play of the third quarter, Alabama started the fourth quarter with a first down on Clemson's 27-yard-line. However, Alabama's offense stalled again, losing seven yards on 4th-and-goal from Clemson's 2-yard-line; this was the Tide's third straight turnover on downs, with all three coming in Clemson territory. Clemson was then unable to take advantage of their possession and punted for the first time since the first quarter; the punt was downed at Alabama's 48-yard-line. Alabama began their fourth second-half drive with just over eleven minutes on the clock and Jalen Hurts at quarterback; it ended in a three-and-out, and Mike Bernier's punt was downed at the Clemson one-yard-line. After draining more than seven minutes on the clock and with the ball on Alabama's 17-yard-line, the majority of Clemson's offensive starters were removed from the game, and Chase Brice was put in at quarterback. Clemson used up the remaining two minutes off the clock and took a knee on the final play ending the longest drive (10:02) in Clemson history and winning the National Championship, their second title in three years.

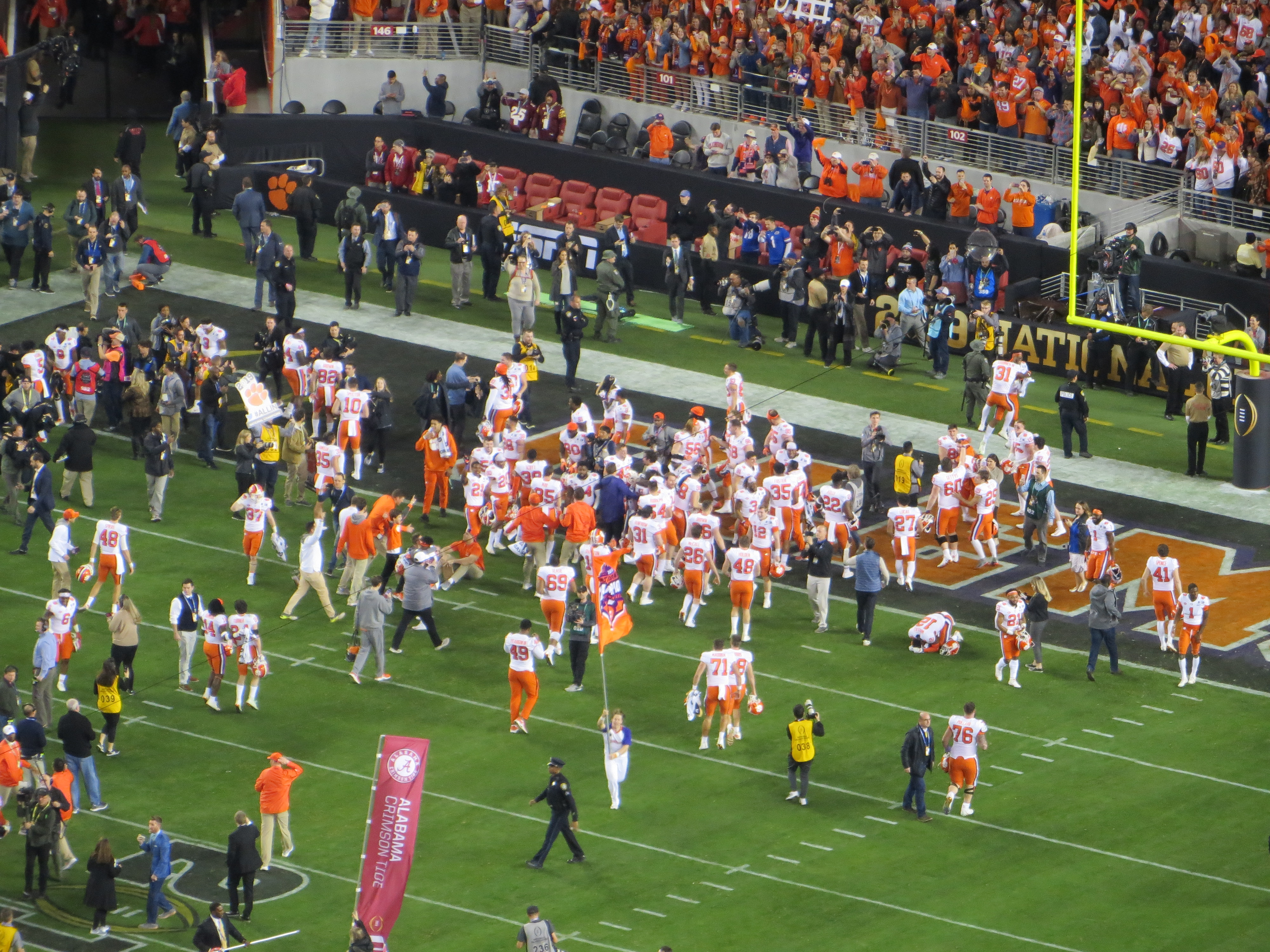
Clemson players celebrate in the end zone near the majority of their fans.

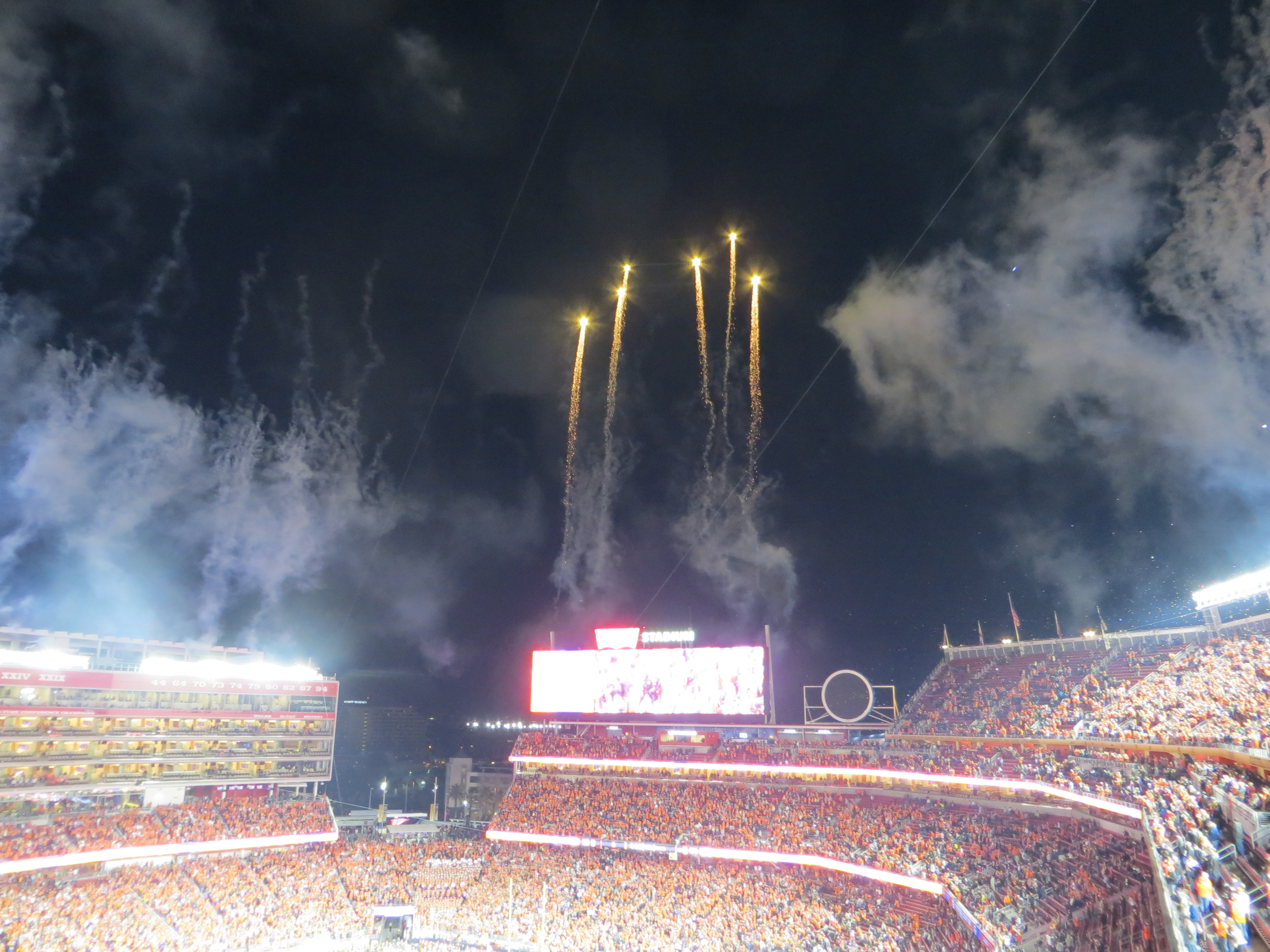
Fireworks went off after the conclusion of the game.

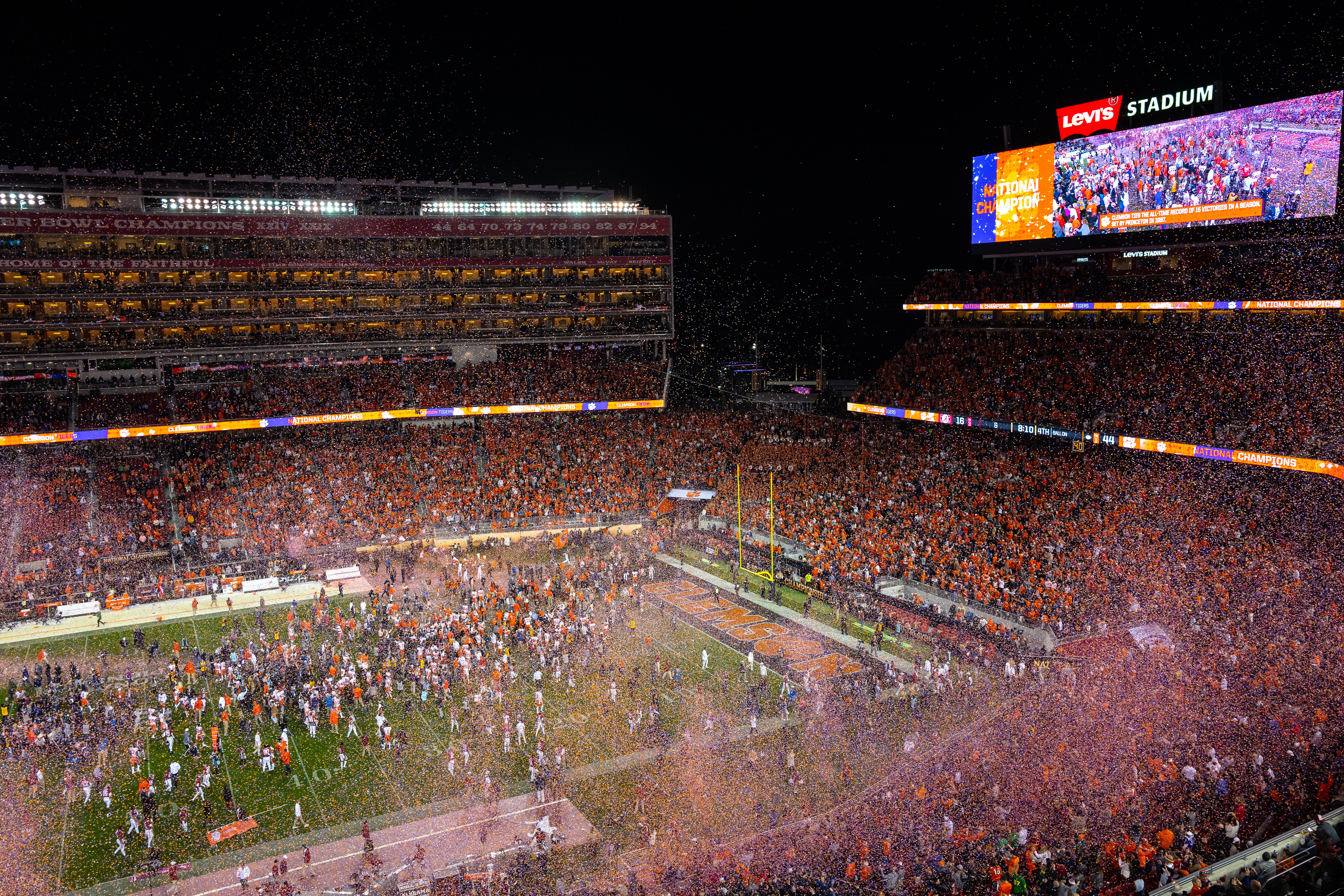
Clemson is recognized historical 15–0 national champion as confetti falls after the game.

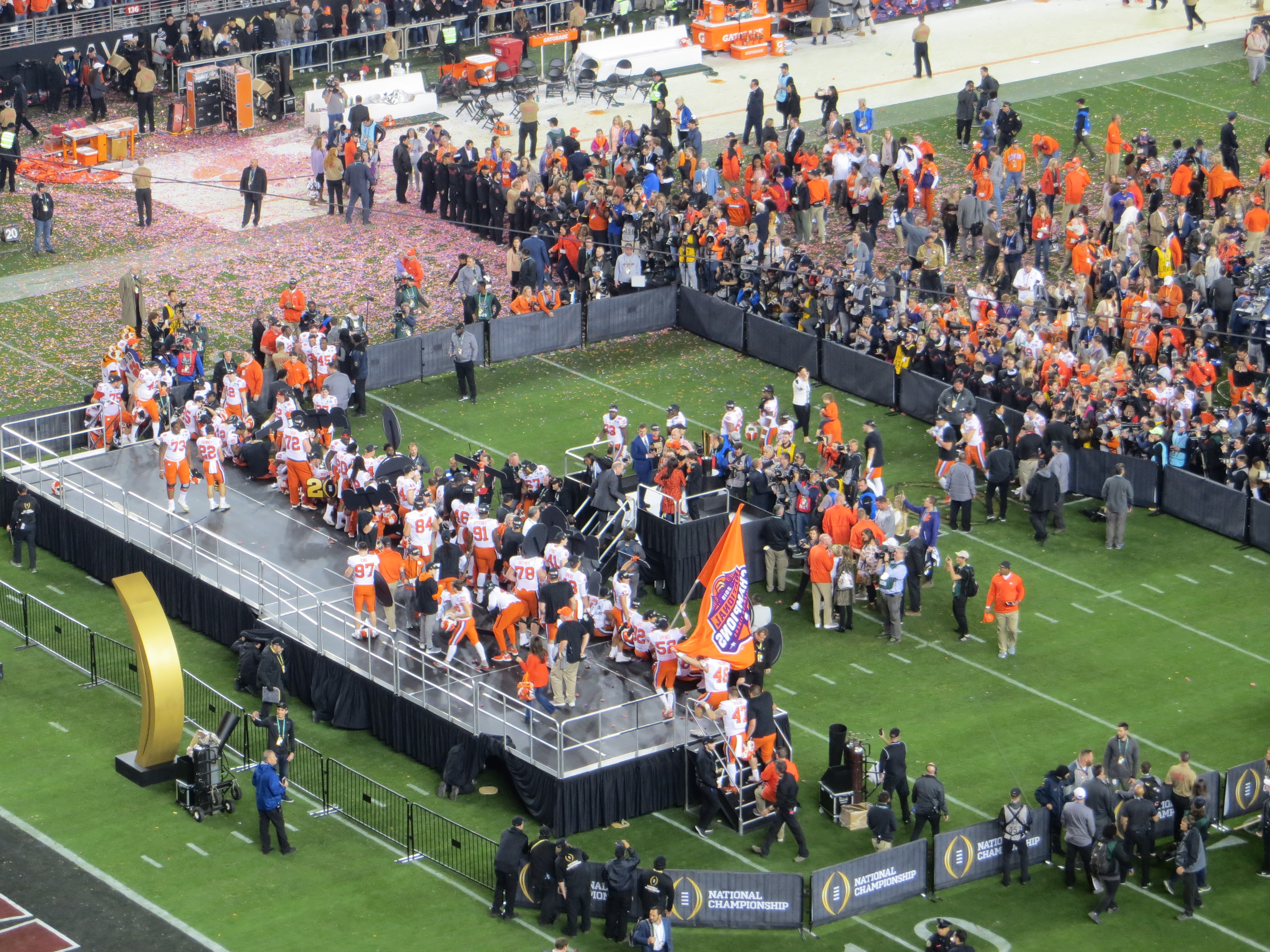
Clemson players take the stage to receive the trophy.

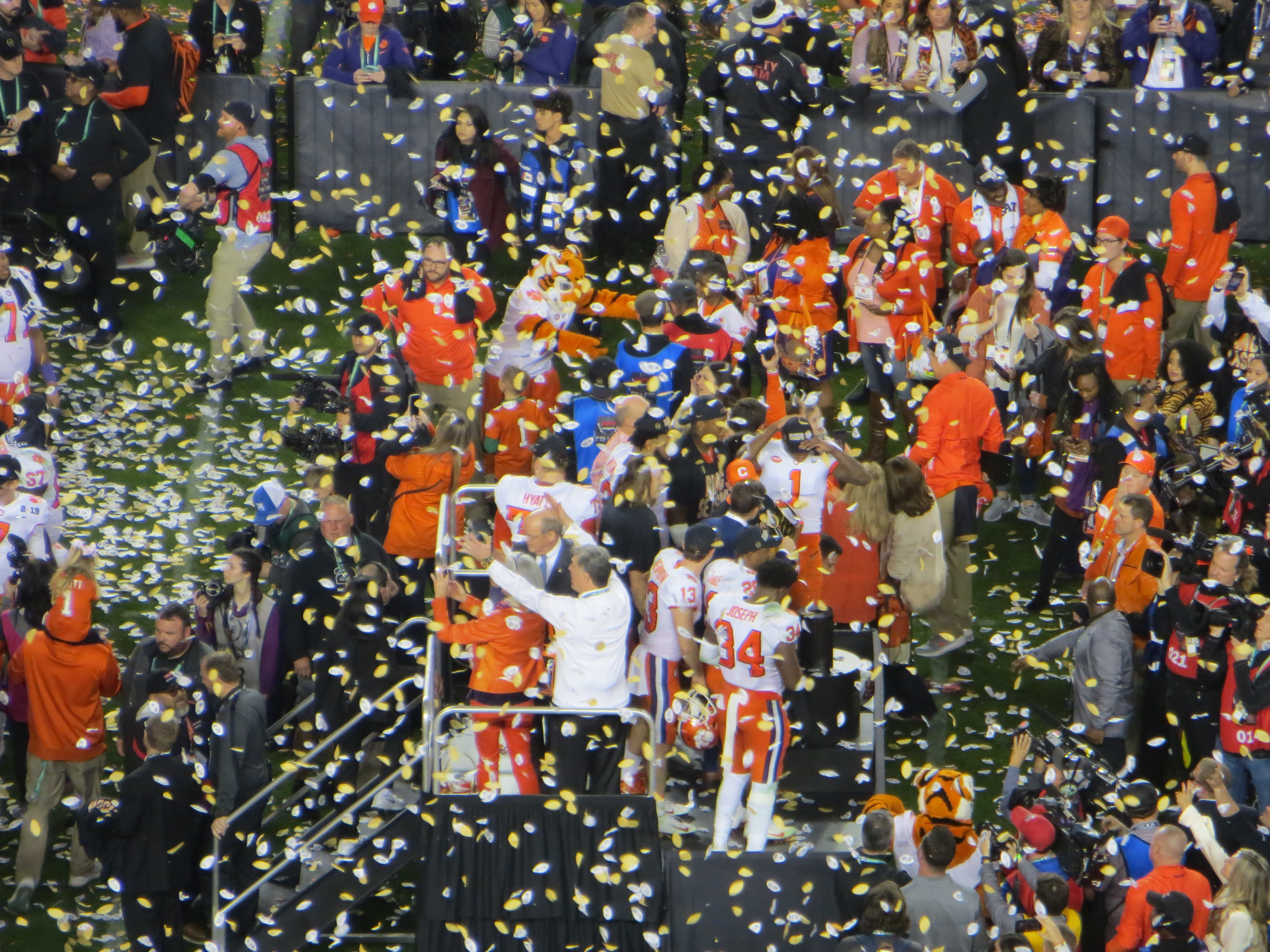
Clemson's coach and players are presented with the championship trophy.

=== Scoring summary ===
2019 College Football Playoff National Championship

Quarter	1	2	3	4	Total
No. 2 Clemson	14	17	13	0	44
No. 1 Alabama	13	3	0	0	16

at Levi's Stadium • Santa Clara, California

- Date: Monday, January 7, 2019
- Game time: 5:00 p.m. PST
- Game weather: TBD
- Game attendance: 74,814
- Referee: Mike Cannon (Big Ten)
- TV announcers (ESPN): Chris Fowler (play-by-play), Kirk Herbstreit (analyst), Maria Taylor and Tom Rinaldi (sidelines)
- Box score

Scoring summary

Quarter	Time	Drive			Team	Scoring information	Score	
Quarter	Time	Plays	Yards	TOP	Team	Scoring information	Clemson	Alabama
1	13:20				Clemson	Interception returned 44 yards for touchdown by A. J. Terrell, Greg Huegel kick good	7	0
1	12:05	3	75	1:15	Alabama	Jerry Jeudy 62-yard touchdown reception from Tua Tagovailoa, Joseph Bulovas kick good	7	7
1	10:35	4	75	1:30	Clemson	Travis Etienne 17-yard touchdown run, Greg Huegel kick good	14	7
1	6:23	10	75	4:12	Alabama	Hale Hentges 1-yard touchdown reception from Tua Tagovailoa, Joseph Bulovas kick no good (wide right)	14	13
2	14:18	11	45	6:07	Alabama	25-yard field goal by Joseph Bulovas	14	16
2	11:38	6	65	2:40	Clemson	Travis Etienne 1-yard touchdown run, Greg Huegel kick good	21	16
2	4:38	8	47	3:27	Clemson	Travis Etienne 5-yard touchdown reception from Trevor Lawrence, Greg Huegel kick good	28	16
2	0:45	8	61	1:19	Clemson	36-yard field goal by Greg Huegel	31	16
3	8:26	3	76	1:21	Clemson	Justyn Ross 74-yard touchdown reception from Trevor Lawrence, Greg Huegel kick no good (wide left)	37	16
3	0:21	12	89	5:21	Clemson	Tee Higgins 5-yard touchdown reception from Trevor Lawrence, Greg Huegel kick good	44	16
"TOP" = time of possession. For other American football terms, see Glossary of American football.							44	16

=== Statistics ===
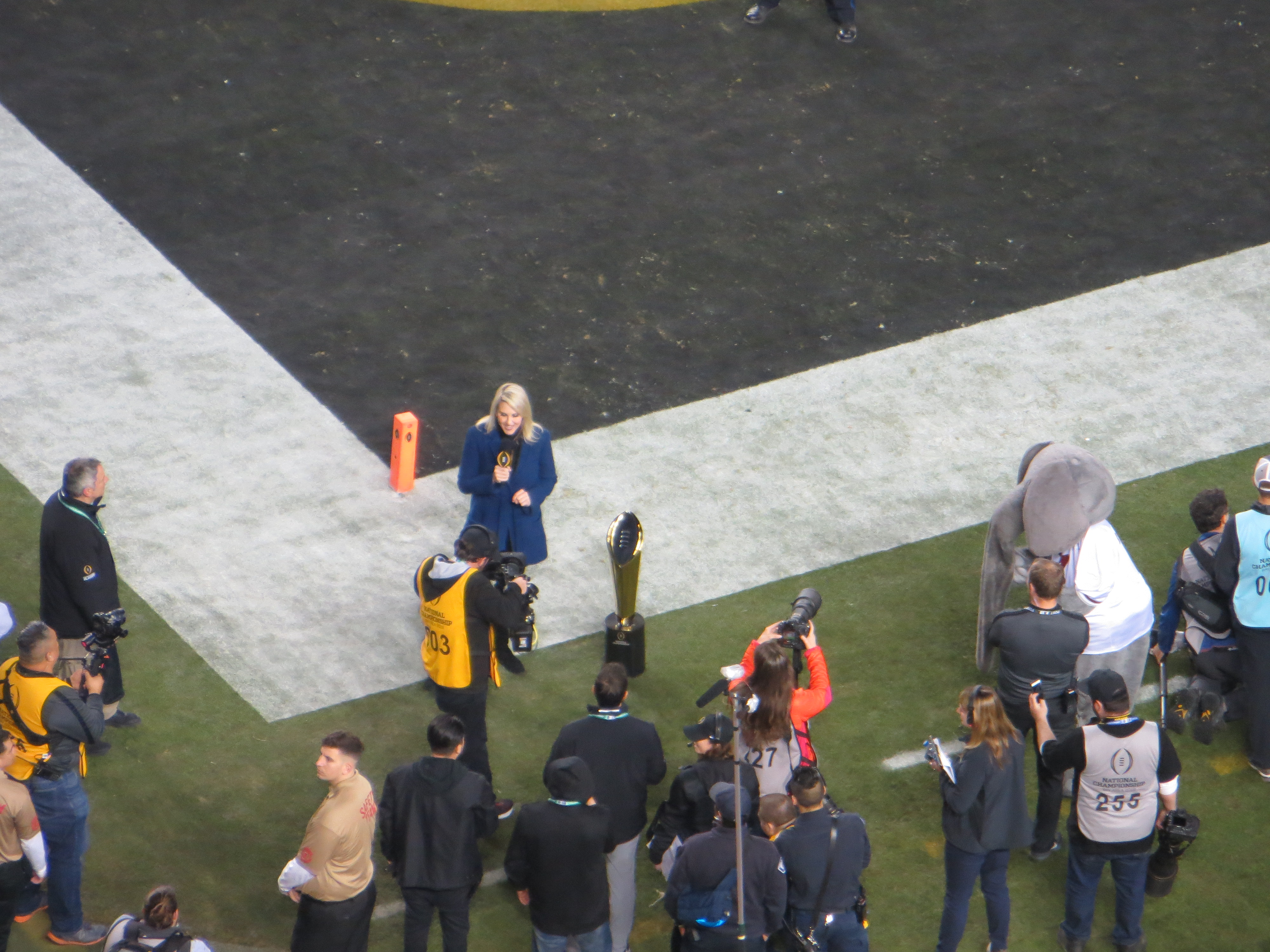
One of the sideline reporters shows off the College Football Playoff trophy late in the fourth quarter.

Statistics	Clemson	Alabama
First downs	21	23
Plays–yards	63–482	73–443
Rushes–yards	31–135	37–148
Passing yards	347	295
Passing: comp–att–int	20–32–0	22–36–2
Turnovers		
Time of possession	28:23	31:37

Team	Category	Player	Statistics
Clemson	Passing	Trevor Lawrence	20/32, 347 yds, 3 TD
Clemson	Rushing	Travis Etienne	14 car, 86 yds, 2 TD
Clemson	Receiving	Justyn Ross	6 rec, 153 yds, 1 TD
Alabama	Passing	Tua Tagovailoa	22/34, 295 yds, 2 TD, 2 INT
Alabama	Rushing	Najee Harris	9 car, 59 yds
Alabama	Receiving	Jerry Jeudy	5 rec, 139 yds, 1 TD

== Broadcasting ==
The game was televised nationally by ESPN, with Megacast coverage across all of its networks except ABC. As in 2018, the network also promoted an off-site concert that was televised at halftime during ESPN's broadcast, featuring rock band Imagine Dragons, including a "special collaboration" with rapper Lil Wayne, on Treasure Island.

== See also ==
- College football national championships in NCAA Division I FBS
- Alabama–Clemson football rivalry
- Super Bowl 50, the NFL championship game contested at the same venue on February 7, 2016
