= 2021 Clemson Tigers football team =

American college football season

2021 Clemson Tigers football

Cheez-It Bowl champion

Cheez-It Bowl, W 20–13 vs. Iowa State
- Conference: Atlantic Coast Conference
- Atlantic Division

Ranking
- Coaches: No. 16
- AP: No. 14
- Record: 10–3 (6–2 ACC)
- Head coach: Dabo Swinney (13th full, 14th overall season)
- Offensive coordinator: Tony Elliott (7th season)
- Offensive scheme: Spread
- Defensive coordinator: Brent Venables (10th season)
- Base defense: 4–3
- Home stadium: Memorial Stadium

Uniform
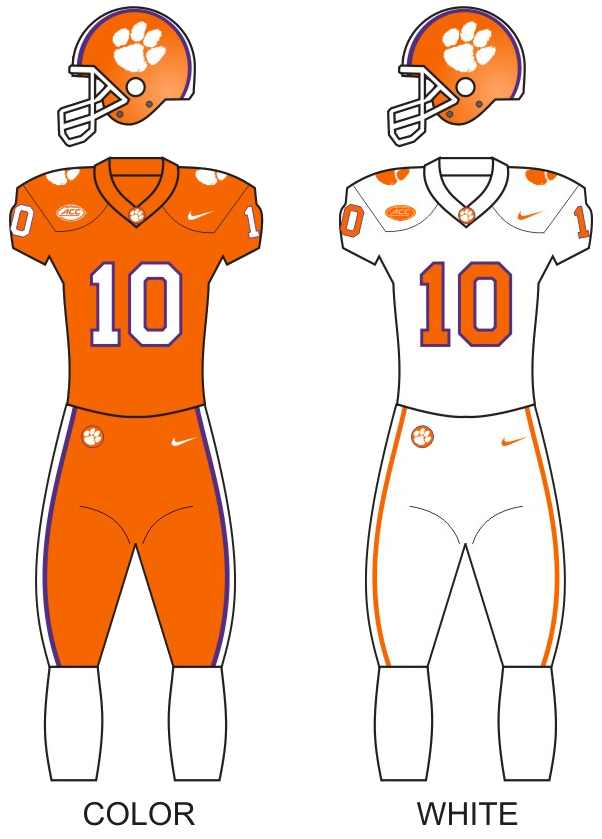

2021 Atlantic Coast Conference football standings
	Conf.			Overall
Team	W		L	W		L
Atlantic Division
No. 15 Wake Forest xy	7	–	1	11	–	3
No. 20 NC State	6	–	2	9	–	3
No. 14 Clemson	6	–	2	10	–	3
Louisville	4	–	4	6	–	7
Florida State	4	–	4	5	–	7
Boston College	2	–	6	6	–	6
Syracuse	2	–	6	5	–	7
Coastal Division
No. 13 Pittsburgh xy$	7	–	1	11	–	3
Miami (FL)	5	–	3	7	–	5
Virginia Tech	4	–	4	6	–	7
Virginia	4	–	4	6	–	6
North Carolina	3	–	5	6	–	7
Georgia Tech	2	–	6	3	–	9
Duke	0	–	8	3	–	9
Championship: Pittsburgh 45, Wake Forest 21
$ – Conference champion; x – Division champion/co-champions; y – Championship game participant; Rankings from AP Poll

The 2021 Clemson Tigers football team represented Clemson University during the 2021 NCAA Division I FBS football season. The Tigers were led by head coach Dabo Swinney, in his 14th year. The Tigers competed as a member of the Atlantic Coast Conference (ACC) and played their home games at Memorial Stadium in Clemson, South Carolina.

For the first time since 2014, Clemson did not reach the ACC Championship Game or the College Football Playoff. This season ended the team's streak of six consecutive conference championships, the longest in FBS as of the 2021 season.

The Tigers ended the season with a victory over Iowa State in the Cheez-It Bowl.

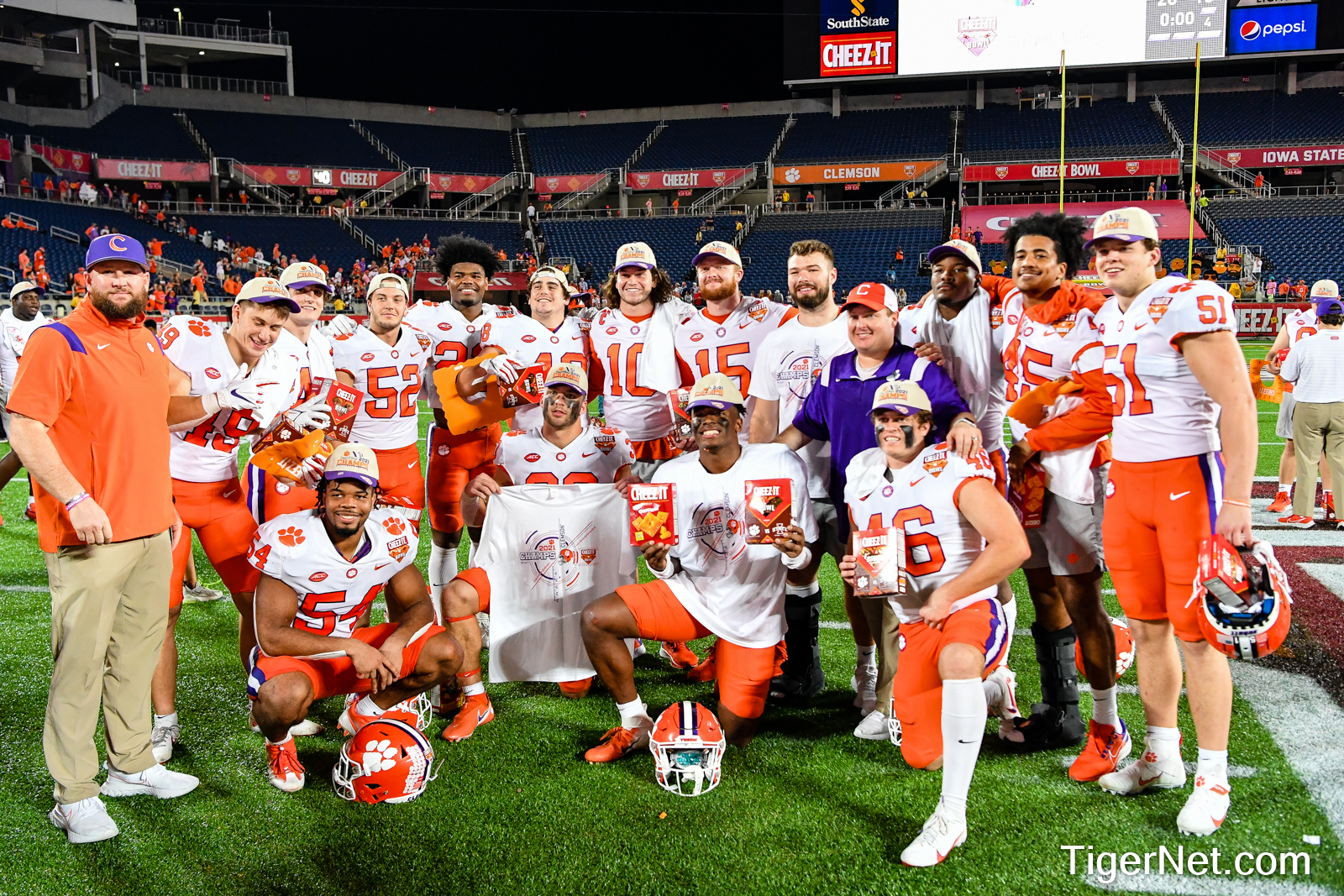
The 2021 Clemson football team after winning the 2021 Cheez-It Bowl against Iowa State.

== Offseason ==
=== Recruiting ===
Clemson's 2021 class consisted of nineteen signees. The class was ranked first in the ACC and fifth best overall by the 247Sports Composite.

College recruiting (2021)
Name	Hometown	School	Height	Weight	Commit date
Jake Briningstool; TE	Brentwood, Tennessee	Ravenwood High School	6 ft 6 in (1.98 m)	215 lb (98 kg)	Jan 26, 2020
Jake Briningstool; TE	Recruit ratings: Rivals: 247Sports: ESPN: (86)				
Barrett Carter; LB	Suwanee, Georgia	North Gwinnett High School	6 ft 1 in (1.85 m)	215 lb (98 kg)	May 19, 2020
Barrett Carter; LB	Recruit ratings: Rivals: 247Sports: ESPN: (84)				
Bubba Chandler; QB	Bogart, Georgia	North Oconee High School	6 ft 4 in (1.93 m)	195 lb (88 kg)	May 20, 2020
Bubba Chandler; QB	Recruit ratings: Rivals: 247Sports: ESPN: (80)				
Beaux Collins; WR	Bellflower, California	St. John Bosco High School	6 ft 4 in (1.93 m)	195 lb (88 kg)	Jan 25, 2020
Beaux Collins; WR	Recruit ratings: Rivals: 247Sports: ESPN: (86)				
Dacari Collins; WR	Atlanta, Georgia	Westlake High School	6 ft 4 in (1.93 m)	200 lb (91 kg)	Sep 7, 2019
Dacari Collins; WR	Recruit ratings: Rivals: 247Sports: ESPN: (84)				
Cade Denhoff; DE	Lakeland, Florida	Lakeland Christian School	6 ft 5 in (1.96 m)	225 lb (102 kg)	Jan 26, 2020
Cade Denhoff; DE	Recruit ratings: Rivals: 247Sports: ESPN: (85)				
Tristan Leigh; OT	Fairfax, Virginia	Robinson Secondary School	6 ft 5 in (1.96 m)	280 lb (130 kg)	Jan 2, 2021
Tristan Leigh; OT	Recruit ratings: Rivals: 247Sports: ESPN: (88)				
Ryan Linthicum; C	Damascus, Maryland	Damascus High School	6 ft 4 in (1.93 m)	275 lb (125 kg)	Sep 23, 2019
Ryan Linthicum; C	Recruit ratings: Rivals: 247Sports: ESPN: (82)				
Phil Mafah; RB	Loganville, Georgia	Grayson High School	6 ft 1 in (1.85 m)	210 lb (95 kg)	Aug 29, 2019
Phil Mafah; RB	Recruit ratings: Rivals: 247Sports: ESPN: (81)				
Andrew Mukuba; S	Austin, Texas	LBJ High School	5 ft 11 in (1.80 m)	180 lb (82 kg)	Oct 1, 2020
Andrew Mukuba; S	Recruit ratings: Rivals: 247Sports: ESPN: (83)				
Payton Page; DT	Greensboro, North Carolina	Dudley High School	6 ft 3 in (1.91 m)	360 lb (160 kg)	Jul 28, 2020
Payton Page; DT	Recruit ratings: Rivals: 247Sports: ESPN: (87)				
Zaire Patterson; DE	Winston-Salem, North Carolina	Winston-Salem Prep	6 ft 6 in (1.98 m)	225 lb (102 kg)	May 26, 2020
Zaire Patterson; DE	Recruit ratings: Rivals: 247Sports: ESPN: (81)				
Dietrick Pennington; OG	Cordova, Tennessee	Evangelical Christian School	6 ft 5 in (1.96 m)	280 lb (130 kg)	Jul 29, 2020
Dietrick Pennington; OG	Recruit ratings: Rivals: 247Sports: ESPN: (83)				
Will Shipley; RB	Matthews, North Carolina	Weddington High School	5 ft 11 in (1.80 m)	200 lb (91 kg)	May 5, 2020
Will Shipley; RB	Recruit ratings: Rivals: 247Sports: ESPN: (88)				
Troy Stellato; WR	Fort Lauderdale, Florida	Cardinal Gibbons High School	6 ft 0 in (1.83 m)	175 lb (79 kg)	Jun 5, 2020
Troy Stellato; WR	Recruit ratings: Rivals: 247Sports: ESPN: (82)				
Marcus Tate; OT	Fort Lauderdale, Florida	NSU University School	6 ft 5 in (1.96 m)	325 lb (147 kg)	Sep 24, 2019
Marcus Tate; OT	Recruit ratings: Rivals: 247Sports: ESPN: (84)				
Will Taylor; ATH	Irmo, South Carolina	Dutch Fork High School	5 ft 10 in (1.78 m)	160 lb (73 kg)	Sep 30, 2020
Will Taylor; ATH	Recruit ratings: Rivals: 247Sports: ESPN: (76)				
Jeremiah Trotter Jr. LB	Philadelphia, Pennsylvania	St. Joseph's Prep	6 ft 1 in (1.85 m)	215 lb (98 kg)	Sep 7, 2019
Jeremiah Trotter Jr. LB	Recruit ratings: Rivals: 247Sports: ESPN: (90)				
Nate Wiggins; CB	Atlanta, Georgia	Westlake High School	6 ft 2 in (1.88 m)	170 lb (77 kg)	Dec 12, 2020
Nate Wiggins; CB	Recruit ratings: Rivals: 247Sports: ESPN: (83)				
Overall recruit ranking: Rivals: 7 247Sports: 5 ESPN: 4
Note: In many cases, Scout, Rivals, 247Sports, On3, and ESPN may conflict in their listings of height and weight.; In these cases, the average was taken. ESPN grades are on a 100-point scale.; Sources: "Rivals commits". Rivals.; "ESPN commits". ESPN.; "2021 Team Ranking". Rivals.com.; "247Sports commits". 247Sports.

=== Players leaving for NFL ===
==== NFL draftees ====
Round	Pick	Player	Position	NFL club
1	1	Trevor Lawrence	QB	Jacksonville Jaguars
1	25	Travis Etienne	RB	Jacksonville Jaguars
2	46	Jackson Carman	OT	Cincinnati Bengals
3	85	Amari Rodgers	WR	Green Bay Packers
5	181	Cornell Powell	WR	Kansas City Chiefs

==== Transfers ====
===== Preseason transfers =====
Name	Number	Pos.	Height	Weight	Year	Hometown	College transferred to	Source(s)
Derion Kendrick	1	CB	6'0"	190	Junior	Rock Hill, SC	Georgia	
DeMarkcus Bowman	1	RB	5'10"	190	Freshman	Lakeland, FL	Florida	
Mike Jones Jr.	6	LB	6'0"	200	(redshirt) Sophomore	Lebanon, TN	LSU	
Michel Dukes	19	RB	5'10"	205	Junior	Charleston, SC	South Florida	
LeAnthony Williams Jr.	20	CB	5'11"	185	(redshirt) Junior	Roswell, GA	Marshall	
Chez Mellusi	27	RB	5'11"	200	Junior	Naples, FL	Wisconsin	
Nyles Pinckney	44	DT	6'1"	300	(redshirt) Senior	Seabrook, SC	Minnesota	
Kaleb Boateng	50	OL	6'4"	315	(redshirt) Freshman	Fort Lauderdale, FL	Florida	
Jordan Williams	59	DT	6'4"	310	(redshirt) Junior	Virginia Beach, VA	Virginia Tech	

===== Midseason transfers =====
Name	Number	Pos.	Height	Weight	Year	Hometown	College transferred to	Source(s)
Frank Ladson Jr.	2	WR	6'3"	205	Junior	Miami, FL	Miami (FL)	
Taisun Phommachanh	7	QB	6'3"	220	(redshirt) Sophomore	Bridgeport, CT	Georgia Tech	
Ajou Ajou	11	WR	6'3"	215	Sophomore	Alberta, Canada	South Florida	
Ray Thornton III	16	DB	6'1"	205	(redshirt) Sophomore	Phenix City, AL	South Florida	
Kane Patterson	17	LB	6'1"	225	Junior	Brentwood, TN	Vanderbilt	
Joseph Charleston	18	S	6'0"	190	Junior	Milton, GA	Missouri	
Lyn-J Dixon	23	RB	5'10"	195	Senior	Butler, GA	West Virginia	
Paul Tchio	57	OL	6'5"	300	Sophomore	Milton, GA	Georgia Tech	

== Preseason ==
=== Award watch lists ===
Listed in the order that they were released

Award	Player	Position	Year
Lott Trophy	Andrew Booth Jr.	CB	JR
Lott Trophy	Nolan Turner	S	SR
Maxwell Award	DJ Uiagalelei	QB	SO
Maxwell Award	Justyn Ross	WR	JR
Bednarik Award	Bryan Bresee	DT	SO
Bednarik Award	Nolan Tuner	S	SR
Davey O'Brien Award	DJ Uiagalelei	QB	SO
Doak Walker Award	Lyn-J Dixon	RB	SR
Biletnikoff Award	Justyn Ross	WR	JR
Butkus Award	James Skalski	LB	SR
Butkus Award	Baylon Spector	LB	SR
Jim Thorpe Award	Andrew Booth Jr.	CB	JR
Jim Thorpe Award	Nolan Tuner	S	SR
Bronko Nagurski Trophy	Bryan Bresee	DT	SO
Bronko Nagurski Trophy	Myles Murphy	DT	SO
Bronko Nagurski Trophy	James Skalski	LB	SR
Bronko Nagurski Trophy	Nolan Tuner	S	SR
Outland Trophy	Bryan Bresee	DT	SO
Outland Trophy	Tyler Davis	DT	JR
Outland Trophy	Jordan McFadden	OT	JR
Ray Guy Award	Will Spiers	P	GS
Lou Groza Award	B. T. Potter	PK	SR
Walter Camp Award	Bryan Bresee	DT	SO
Walter Camp Award	Justyn Ross	WR	JR

== Schedule ==
Date	Time	Opponent	Rank	Site	TV	Result	Attendance
September 4	7:30 p.m.	vs. No. 5 Georgia*	No. 3	Bank of America Stadium; Charlotte, NC (Duke's Mayo Classic, rivalry, College GameDay)	ABC	L 3–10	74,187
September 11	5:00 p.m.	South Carolina State*	No. 6	Memorial Stadium; Clemson, SC	ACCN	W 49–3	78,609
September 18	3:30 p.m.	Georgia Tech	No. 6	Memorial Stadium; Clemson, SC (rivalry)	ABC	W 14–8	81,500
September 25	3:30 p.m.	at NC State	No. 9	Carter–Finley Stadium; Raleigh, NC (Textile Bowl)	ESPN	L 21–27 ^{2OT}	56,919
October 2	7:30 p.m.	Boston College^{†}	No. 25	Memorial Stadium; Clemson, SC (O'Rourke–McFadden Trophy)	ACCN	W 19–13	79,159
October 15	7:00 p.m.	at Syracuse		Carrier Dome; Syracuse, NY	ESPN	W 17–14	36,670
October 23	3:30 p.m.	at No. 23 Pittsburgh		Heinz Field; Pittsburgh, PA	ESPN	L 17–27	60,594
October 30	3:30 p.m.	Florida State		Memorial Stadium; Clemson, SC (rivalry)	ESPN	W 30–20	79,097
November 6	7:30 p.m.	at Louisville		Cardinal Stadium; Louisville, KY	ACCN	W 30–24	51,729
November 13	12:00 p.m.	UConn*		Memorial Stadium; Clemson, SC	ACCN	W 44–7	77,522
November 20	12:00 p.m.	No. 10 Wake Forest		Memorial Stadium; Clemson, SC	ESPN	W 48–27	81,048
November 27	7:30 p.m.	at South Carolina*	No. 23	Williams–Brice Stadium; Columbia, SC (rivalry)	SECN	W 30–0	79,897
December 29	5:45 p.m.	vs. Iowa State*	No. 19	Camping World Stadium; Orlando, FL (Cheez-It Bowl)	ESPN	W 20–13	39,051
*Non-conference game; ^{†}Homecoming; Rankings from AP Poll (and CFP Rankings, after November 2) - Released prior to game; All times are in Eastern time

== Rankings ==
Ranking movements Legend: ██ Increase in ranking ██ Decrease in ranking — = Not ranked RV = Received votes ( ) = First-place votes
	Week															
Poll	Pre	1	2	3	4	5	6	7	8	9	10	11	12	13	14	Final
AP	3 (6)	6	6	9	25	RV	RV	RV	—	—	—	—	RV	22	19	14
Coaches	2	6	6	7	19	21	25	24	—	RV	RV	RV	RV	24	22	16
CFP	Not released									—	—	—	23	20	19	Not released

== Personnel ==
=== Coaching staff ===
Clemson Tigers football current coaching staff
Name	Position	Alma mater	Years at Clemson
Dabo Swinney	Head coach	University of Alabama (1993)	14th
Brent Venables	Associate head coach/defensive coordinator/linebackers coach	Kansas State University (1992)	9th
Tony Elliott	Assistant head coach/offensive coordinator/tight ends coach	Clemson University (2002)	6th
Mickey Conn	Assistant coach/Special teams coordinator/safeties coach	University of Alabama (1995)	6th
Brandon Streeter	Assistant coach/passing game coordinator/quarterbacks coach	Clemson University (1999)	7th
Todd Bates	Assistant coach/recruiting coordinator/defensive tackles coach	University of Alabama (2004)	4th
Robbie Caldwell	Assistant coach/offensive linemen coach	Furman University (1977)	10th
Tyler Grisham	Assistant coach/wide receivers coach	Clemson University (2009)	2nd
Lemanski Hall	Assistant coach/defensive ends coach	University of Alabama (1993)	4th
Mike Reed	Assistant coach/cornerbacks coach	Boston College (1994)	8th
C. J. Spiller	Assistant coach/running backs coach	Clemson University (2009)	1st

=== Roster ===
As of July 28, 2021

2021 Clemson Tigers Football
Quarterback: 5 DJ Uiagalelei – sophomore (6'4, 250); 7 Taisun Phommachanh – (redshirt) sophomore (6'3, 220); 12 Bubba Chandler – freshman (6'3, 190); 16 Will Taylor – freshman (5'10, 175); 17 Billy Wiles – freshman (6'3, 215); 18 Hunter Helms – (redshirt) freshman (6'1, 210); Running back: 1 Will Shipley – freshman (5'11, 200); 19 Michel Dukes – junior (5'10, 205); 20 Kobe Pace – sophomore (5'10, 215); 21 Darien Rencher – (redshirt) senior (5'8, 195); 23 Lyn-J Dixon – senior (5'10, 195); 26 Phil Mafah – freshman (6'1, 215); 34 Kevin McNeal – freshman (5'9, 195); Wide receiver: 2 Frank Ladson Jr. – junior (6'3 205); 3 Dacari Collins – freshman (6'5, 200); 6 E.J. Williams Jr. – sophomore (6'3, 190); 8 Justyn Ross – (redshirt) junior (6'4, 205); 10 Joseph Ngata – junior (6'3, 220); 11 Ajou Ajou – sophomore (6'3, 215); 13 Brannon Specter – (redshirt) sophomore (6'1, 195); 15 Troy Stellato – freshman (6'1, 175); 22 Will Swinney – senior (5'9, 185); 24 Hamp Greene – (redshirt) sophomore (5'9, 175); 32 Wise Segars Jr. – freshman (6'2, 195); 80 Beaux Collins – freshman (6'3, 195); 81 Drew Swinney – (redshirt) junior (5'8, 185); 82 Will Brown – (redshirt) senior (5'8, 190); 82 Jackson Crosby – freshman (5'11, 180); 83 Hampton Earle – (redshirt) sophomore (5'10, 185); 86 Tye Herbstreit – (redshirt) sophomore (5'11, 170); 89 Max May – (redshirt) junior (6'1, 190); 89 Zach Jackson – freshman (6'3, 200); Tight end: 9 Jake Briningstool – freshman (6'6, 215); 40 Luke Price – (redshirt) senior (6'2, 235); 43 Will Blackston – (redshirt) freshman (6'1, 250); 44 Banks Pope – freshman (6'4, 250); 84 Davis Allen – junior (6'6, 250); 85 Jaelyn Lay – (redshirt) sophomore (6'6, 270); 87 Sage Ennis – (redshirt) freshman (6'4, 235); 88 Braden Galloway – senior (6'4, 240); Placekicker: 29 B. T. Potter – senior (5'10, 180); 36 Quinn Castner – (redshirt) freshman (5'5, 140); 41 Jonathan Weitz – (redshirt) sophomore (5'11, 190); 47 Hogan Morton – freshman (5'9, 160)	Offensive lineman: 52 Tayquon Johnson – OG – (redshirt) sophomore (6'2, 340); 53 Ryan Linthicum – OL – freshman (6'4, 280); 54 Mason Trotter – OL – (redshirt) sophomore (6'2, 280); 55 Hunter Rayburn – OL – (redshirt) sophomore (6'4, 320); 56 Will Putnam – OL – junior (6'4, 300); 57 Paul Tchio – OL – sophomore (6'5, 300); 59 Dietrick Pennington – OL – freshman (6'5, 310); 60 Mac Cranford – OL – (redshirt) sophomore (6'0, 290); 62 Connor Graham – OL – (redshirt) freshman (6'1, 285); 63 Zac McIntosh – OL – (redshirt) senior (5'11, 285); 64 Walker Parks – OL – sophomore (6'5, 295); 65 Matt Bockhorst – OG – (redshirt) Graduate (6'4, 315); 68 Will Boggs – OL – (redshirt) freshman (6'3, 290); 69 Jacob Edwards – OL – (redshirt) senior (6'2, 300); 70 Tristan Leigh – OL – freshman (6'6, 290); 71 Jordan McFadden – OT – (redshirt) junior (6'2, 300); 73 Bryn Tucker – OL – (redshirt) freshman (6'3, 315); 74 Marcus Tate – OL – freshman (6'5, 290); 75 Trent Howard – OL – (redshirt) freshman (6'3, 275); 76 John Williams – OL – (redshirt) freshman (6'4, 300); 77 Mitchell Mayes – OL – sophomore (6'3, 300); Defensive lineman: 3 Xavier Thomas – DE – senior (6'2, 270); 5 KJ Henry – DE – (redshirt) junior (6'4, 255); 7 Justin Mascoll – DE – (redshirt) junior (6'3, 255); 8 Tré Williams – DT – (redshirt) freshman (6'2, 300); 11 Bryan Bresee – DT – sophomore (6'5, 300); 13 Tyler Davis – DT – junior (6'2, 300); 14 Kevin Swint – DE – sophomore (6'3, 230); 19 Demonte Capehart – DL – (redshirt) freshman (6'5, 305); 32 Etinosa Reuben – DT – (redshirt) sophomore (6'3, 280); 33 Ruke Orhorhoro – DT – (redshirt) sophomore (6'4, 295); 34 Armon Mason – DE – freshman (6'2, 210); 35 Justin Foster – DE – (redshirt) senior (6'2, 275); 41 Andrew Roberts – DE – (redshirt) junior (6'4, 225); 44 Cade Denhoff – DE – freshman (6'5, 225); 53 Regan Upshaw – DE – (redshirt) Graduate (5'11, 240); 55 Payton Page – DT – freshman (6'4, 315); 58 Evan McCutchen – DE – (redshirt) freshman (6'2, 240); 90 Darnell Jefferies – DT – (redshirt) junior (6'2, 290); 91 Zaire Patterson – DE – freshman (6'6, 225); 92 Klayton Randolph – DE – (redshirt) junior (6'2, 250); 95 James Edwards – DT – (redshirt) senior (6'2, 300); 97 Nick Eddis – DT – (redshirt) senior (5'11, 270); 98 Myles Murphy – DE – sophomore (6'5, 275); 99 Greg Williams – DE – (redshirt) sophomore (6'4, 260); Punter: 39 Aidan Swanson – (redshirt) sophomore (6'3, 180); 48 Will Spiers – (redshirt) Graduate (6'5, 225)	Linebacker: 0 Barrett Carter – freshman (6'1, 220); 6 Sheridan Jones – junior (6'0, 185); 10 Baylon Spector – (redshirt) Graduate (6'2, 230); 15 Jake Venables – (redshirt) junior (6'2, 235); 17 Kane Patterson – junior (6'1, 225); 22 Trenton Simpson – sophomore (6'3, 225); 30 Keith Maguire – (redshirt) sophomore (6'2, 230); 40 Tristen Rigby – freshman (5'11, 205); 42 LaVonta Bradley – (redshirt) sophomore (6'0, 235); 43 Riggs Faulkenberry – freshman (6'2, 210); 45 Sergio Allen – sophomore (6'1, 225); 46 Matt McMahan – (redshirt) sophomore (6'0, 220); 47 James Skalski – (redshirt) Graduate (6'0, 240); 48 David Cote – (redshirt) sophomore (5'11, 215); 49 Matt Maloney – (redshirt) sophomore (6'0, 200); 51 Colby Doolittle – freshman (6'2, 225); 52 Joey Eddis – (redshirt) freshman (6'0, 200); 54 Jeremiah Trotter Jr. – freshman (6'1, 210); 56 Reed Morrissey – freshman (6'0, 200); 57 Jacob Hendricks – freshman (5'8, 185); Defensive back: 1 Andrew Mukuba – S – freshman (6'0, 185); 2 Fred Davis II – CB – sophomore (6'0, 185); 9 R.J. Mickens – S – sophomore (6'0, 200); 12 Tyler Venables – S – sophomore (5'10, 200); 16 Ray Thornton III – DB – (redshirt) sophomore (6'1, 205); 18 Joseph Charleston – S – junior (6'0, 190); 20 Nate Wiggins – CB – freshman (6'2, 175); 21 Malcolm Greene – CB – sophomore (5'11, 190); 23 Andrew Booth Jr. – CB – junior (6'0, 195); 24 Nolan Turner – S – (redshirt) senior (6'1, 205); 25 Jalyn Phillips – S – junior (6'1, 210); 26 Jack McCall – CB – (redshirt) senior (5'11, 200); 27 Carson Donnelly – S – (redshirt) junior (5'10, 195); 29 Michael Becker – S – (redshirt) junior (6'0, 205); 31 Mario Goodrich – CB – senior (6'0, 190); 36 Lannden Zanders – S – junior (6'1, 200); 38 Peter Nearn – S – freshman (6'2, 190); 39 Bubba McAtee – S – (redshirt) freshman (6'2, 190); Long snappers: 33 Ty Lucas – (redshirt) junior (5'7, 220); 46 Jack Maddox – (redshirt) senior (6'3, 235); 58 Holden Caspersen – freshman (6'0, 210)

== Game summaries ==
=== vs. No. 5 Georgia ===
Nolan Smith (#4, upper right), outside linebacker with the Bulldogs, during a game against the Clemson Tigers on September 4, 2021.

No. 3 Clemson Tigers vs No. 5 Georgia Bulldogs − Game summary

Quarter	1	2	3	4	Total
No. 5 Georgia	0	7	3	0	10
No. 3 Clemson	0	0	0	3	3

at Bank of America Stadium • Charlotte, NC

- Date: September 4, 2021
- Game time: 7:30 p.m.
- Game weather: Temperature: 80 °F (27 °C) • Wind: 2 mph (3.2 km/h) S • Weather: Sunny
- Game attendance: 74,187
- Referee: Jason Autrey
- TV announcers (ABC): Chris Fowler (play-by-play), Kirk Herbstreit (color) and Holly Rowe (sideline)

Game information

First quarter

- None

Second quarter

- UGA – Christopher Smith II 74 yard interception return, (Jack Podlesny PAT), 02:58. Bulldogs 7–0. Drive: 1 play, 74 yards.

Third quarter

- UGA – Jack Podlesny 22 yard field goal, 02:38. Bulldogs 10–0. Drive: 11 plays, 81 yards, 4:51.

Fourth quarter

- CLEM – B. T. Potter 22 yard field goal, 09:08. Bulldogs 10–3. Drive: 10 plays, 82 yards, 3:48.

Top passers

- CLEM – DJ Uiagalelei: 19–37, 178 yards, 1 INT
- UGA – JT Daniels: 20–30, 135 yards, 1 INT

Top rushers

- CLEM – Lyn-J Dixon: 1 rush, 10 yards
- UGA – Zamir White: 13 rushes, 74 yards

Top Receiving

- CLEM – Joseph Ngata: 6 receptions, 110 yards
- UGA – Brock Bowers: 6 receptions, 43 yards

=== South Carolina State ===
South Carolina State Bulldogs at No. 6 Clemson Tigers − Game summary

Quarter	1	2	3	4	Total
South Carolina State	0	3	0	0	3
No. 6 Clemson	28	7	14	0	49

at Memorial Stadium • Clemson, SC

- Date: September 11, 2021
- Game time: 5:00 p.m.
- Game weather: Temperature: • Wind: • Weather: Sunny
- Game attendance: 78,609
- Referee: Marcus Woods
- TV announcers (ACCN): Dave O'Brien (play-by-play), Tim Hasselbeck (analyst) & Kelsey Riggs (sideline)

Game information

First quarter

- CLEM – DJ Uiagalelei 4 yard rush, (B. T. Potter PAT), 11:38. Tigers 7–0. Drive: 9 plays, 72 yards, 3:20.
- CLEM – Will Shipley 7 yard rush, (Potter PAT), 07:20. Tigers 14–0. Drive: 7 plays, 67 yards, 2:49.
- CLEM – Kobe Pace 2 yard rush, (Potter PAT), 03:21. Tigers 21–0. Drive: 8 plays, 56 yards, 2:13.
- CLEM – Uiagalelei 11 yard pass to Justyn Ross, (Potter PAT), 02:21. Tigers 28–0. Drive: 1 play, 11 yards, 00:06.

Second quarter

- CLEM – Uiagalelei 5 yard rush, (Potter PAT), 06:43. Tigers 35–0. Drive: 6 plays, 84 yards, 2:22.
- SCST – Dyson Roberts 27 yard FG, 00:19. Tigers 35–3. Drive: 6 plays, 26 yards, 1:45.

Third quarter

- CLEM – Shipley 13 yard rush, (Potter PAT), 09:39. Tigers 42–3. Drive: 9 plays, 65 yards, 3:44.
- CLEM – Taisun Phommachanh 14 yard pass to Lyn-J Dixon, (Potter PAT), 03:52. Tigers 49–3. Drive: 10 plays, 63 yards, 3:31.

Fourth quarter

- None

Top passers

- CLEM – DJ Uiagalelei: 14–24, 171 yards, 1 TD, 1 INT
- SCST – Corey Fields Jr.: 10–24, 132 yards, 1 INT

Top rushers

- CLEM – Will Shipley: 8 rushes, 80 yards, 2 TDs
- SCST – Kendrell Flowers: 11 rushes, 53 yards

Top Receiving

- CLEM – Justyn Ross: 3 receptions, 52 yards, 1 TD
- SCST – Will Vreen: 4 receptions, 96 yards

=== Georgia Tech ===
Georgia Tech Yellow Jackets at No. 6 Clemson Tigers − Game summary

Quarter	1	2	3	4	Total
Georgia Tech	0	3	0	5	8
No. 6 Clemson	7	0	0	7	14

at Memorial Stadium • Clemson, SC

- Date: September 18, 2021
- Game time: 3:30 p.m.
- Game weather: Temperature: 80 °F (27 °C) • Wind: South 4 mph (6.4 km/h) • Weather: Cloudy
- Game attendance: 81,500
- Referee: Jeff Heaser
- TV announcers (ABC): Bob Wischusen (play-by-play), Dan Orlovsky (analyst) & Kris Budden (sideline)

Game information

First quarter

- CLEM – Will Shipley 3 yard run, (B. T. Potter PAT), 04:37. Tigers 7–0. Drive: 8 plays, 39 yards, 3:15.

Second quarter

- GT – Brent Cimaglia 22 yard field goal, 00:00. Tigers 7–3. Drive: 14 plays, 66 yards, 2:47.

Third quarter

- None

Fourth quarter

- CLEM – Shipley 3 yard run, (Potter PAT), 08:12. Tigers 14–3. Drive: 12 plays, 66 yards, 4:29
- GT – Cimaglia 22 yard field goal, 01:19. Tigers 14–6. Drive: 16 plays, 70 yards, 6:53
- GT – Safety, 00:07. Tigers 14–8. Drive: 1 play, 2 yards, 00:08.

Top passers

- CLEM – DJ Uiagalelei: 18–25, 126 yards
- GT – Jordan Yates: 20–34, 203 yards, 1 INT

Top rushers

- CLEM – Will Shipley: 21 rushes, 88 yards, 2 TDs
- GT – Jahmyr Gibbs: 11 rushes, 30 yards

Top Receiving

- CLEM – Justyn Ross: 7 receptions, 61 yards
- GT – Kyric McGowan: 4 receptions, 82 yards

=== At NC State ===
No. 9 Clemson Tigers at NC State Wolfpack − Game summary

Quarter	1	2	3	4	OT	2OT	Total
No. 9 Clemson	7	0	7	0	7	0	21
NC State	7	0	7	0	7	6	27

at Carter–Finley Stadium • Raleigh, NC

- Date: September 25, 2021
- Game time: 3:30 p.m.
- Game weather: Temperature: 75 °F (24 °C) • Wind: • Weather: Sunny
- Game attendance: 56,919
- Referee: Jeff Flanagan
- TV announcers (ESPN): Mark Jones (play-by-play), Robert Griffin III (analyst) & Quint Kessenich (sideline)

Game information

First quarter

- CLEM – Justyn Ross 32-yard pass from DJ Uiagalelei (B. T. Potter kick), 9:11. Tigers 7–0. Drive: 5 plays, 80 yards, 1:33.
- NCST – Emeka Emezie 9-yard pass from Devin Leary (Christopher Dunn kick), 0:05. Tied 7–7. Drive: 10 plays, 54 yards, 4:43.

Second quarter

- No scoring plays

Third quarter

- NCST – Devin Carter 12-yard pass from Devin Leary (Christopher Dunn kick), 5:10. Wolfpack 14–7. Drive: 9 plays, 77 yards, 4:09.

Fourth quarter

- CLEM – Will Shipley 5-yard run (Potter kick), 10:52. Tied 14–14. Drive: 7 plays, 80 yards, 2:41.

Overtime

- CLEM – Justyn Ross 9-yard pass from DJ Uiagalelei (Potter kick). Tigers 21–14. Drive: 5 plays, 25 yards.
- NCST – Thayer Thomas 2-yard pass from Devin Leary (Christopher Dunn kick). Tied 21–21. Drive: 7 plays, 25 yards.

Second overtime

- NCST – Devin Carter 22-yard pass from Devin Leary (pass failed). Wolfpack 27–21. Drive: 2 plays, 25 yards.

Top passers

- CLEM – DJ Uiagalelei: 12–26, 111 yards, 2 TD, INT
- NCST – Devin Leary: 32–44, 238 yards, 4 TD

Top rushers

- CLEM – DJ Uiagalelei: 9 rushes, 63 yards
- NCST – Ricky Person Jr.: 21 rushes, 91 yards

Top Receiving

- CLEM – Justyn Ross: 8 receptions, 77 yards, 2 TD
- NCST – Emeka Emezie: 14 receptions, 114 yards, TD

=== Boston College ===
Boston College Eagles at No. 25 Clemson Tigers − Game summary

Quarter	1	2	3	4	Total
Boston College	3	3	7	0	13
No. 25 Clemson	7	6	3	3	19

at Memorial Stadium • Clemson, SC

- Date: October 2, 2021
- Game time: 7:30 p.m.
- Game weather: Temperature: 79 °F (26 °C) • Wind: SW @ 2 mph (3.2 km/h) • Weather: Cloudy
- Game attendance: 79,159
- Referee: Mike Roche
- TV announcers (ACCN): Dave O'Brien (play-by-play), Tim Hasselbeck (analyst) and Kelsey Riggs (sideline)

Game information

First quarter

- CLEM – Kobe Pace 59 yard rush, (B. T. Potter PAT), 08:02. Tigers 7–0. Drive: 5 plays, 86 yards, 1:42.
- BC – Connor Lytton 22 yard field goal, 02:59. Tigers 7–3. Drive: 10 plays, 70 yards, 5:03.

Second quarter

- CLEM – Potter 18 yard field goal, 10:10. Tigers 10–3. Drive: 10 plays, 94 yards, 5:07.
- CLEM – Potter 40 yard field goal, 07:07. Tigers 13–3. Drive: 7 plays, 27 yards, 1:51.
- BC – Lytton 34 yard field goal, 00:19. Tigers 13–6. Drive: 15 plays, 58 yards, 6:48.

Third quarter

- BC – Patrick Garwo III 3 yard rush, (Lytton PAT), 14:05. Tied 13–13. Drive: 4 plays, 75 yards, 00:55.
- CLEM – Potter 35 yard field goal, 01:10. Tigers 16–13. Drive: 6 plays, 15 yards, 2:00.

Fourth quarter

- CLEM – Potter 42 yard field goal, 04:51. Tigers 19–13. Drive: 7 plays, 55 yards, 2:21.

Top passers

- CLEM – DJ Uiagalelei: 13–28, 207 yards
- BC – Dennis Grosel: 23–40, 311 yards, 2 INT

Top rushers

- CLEM – Kobe Pace: 19 rushes, 125 yards, 1 TD
- BC – Patrick Garwo III: 12 rushes, 57 yards, 1 TD

Top Receiving

- CLEM – Joseph Ngata: 4 receptions, 111 yards
- BC – Trae Barry: 7 receptions, 82 yards

=== At Syracuse ===
Clemson Tigers at Syracuse Orange − Game summary

Quarter	1	2	3	4	Total
Clemson	0	14	0	3	17
Syracuse	0	7	0	7	14

at Carrier Dome • Syracuse, NY

- Date: October 15, 2021
- Game time: 7:00 p.m.
- Game weather: n/a (game played indoors)
- Game attendance: 36,670
- Referee: Marcus Woods
- TV announcers (ESPN): Anish Shroff (play-by-play), Mike Golic Jr. (analyst), Taylor McGregor (sideline)

Game information

First quarter

- None

Second quarter

- CLEM – Joseph Ngata 19 yard pass from DJ Uiagalelei (B. T. Potter kick), 9:06. Tigers 7–0. Drive: 12 plays, 87 yards, 6:57.
- CUSE – Garrett Shrader 2 yard run (Andre Szmyt kick), 3:28. Tied 7–7. Drive: 10 plays, 91 yards, 3:38.
- CLEM – Kobe Pace 2 yard run (Potter kick), 0:09. Tigers 14–7. Drive: 13 plays, 58 yards, 1:57.

Third quarter

- None

Fourth quarter

- CLEM – Potter 40 yard field goal. Tigers 17–7. Drive: 7 plays, 46 yards, 2:31.
- CUSE – Trebor Peña 62 yard pass from Shrader (Szmyt kick), 7:18. Tigers 17–14. Drive: 5 plays, 75 yards, 2:04.

Top passers

- CLEM – DJ Uiagalelei: 21–34, 181 yards, 1 TD
- CUSE – Garrett Shrader: 17–37, 191 yards, 1 TD, 1 INT

Top rushers

- CLEM – Kobe Pace: 14 rushes, 76 yards, 1 TD
- CUSE – Sean Tucker: 22 rushes, 157 yards

Top Receiving

- CLEM – Justyn Ross: 5 receptions, 51 yards
- CUSE – Trebor Peña: 1 reception, 62 yards, 1 TD

=== At No. 23 Pittsburgh ===
Clemson Tigers at No. 23 Pittsburgh Panthers − Game summary

Quarter	1	2	3	4	Total
Clemson	7	0	3	7	17
No. 23 Pittsburgh	0	14	10	3	27

at Heinz Field • Pittsburgh, PA

- Date: October 23, 2021
- Game time: 3:30 p.m.
- Game weather: Temperature: 52 °F (11 °C) • Wind: West @ 7 mph (11 km/h) • Weather: Cloudy
- Game attendance: 60,594
- Referee: Jeff Flanagan
- TV announcers (ESPN): Sean McDonough (play-by-play), Todd Blackledge (analyst), Molly McGrath (sideline)

Game information

First quarter

- CLEM – Phil Mafah 1 yard rush, (B. T. Potter PAT), 01:29. Tigers 7–0. Drive: 8 plays, 80 yards, 03:29.

Second quarter

- PITT – Jordan Addison 23 yard pass from Kenny Pickett, (Sam Scarton PAT), 03:18. Tied 7–7. Drive: 13 plays, 90 yards, 04:19.
- PITT – Taysir Mack 39 yard pass from Pickett, (Scarton PAT), 00:40. Panthers 14–7. Drive: 9 plays, 76 yards, 02:12.

Third quarter

- PITT – SirVocea Dennis 50 yard interception return, (Scarton PAT), 11:30. Panthers 21–7.
- CLEM – Potter 42 yard field goal. Panthers 21–10. Drive: 11 plays, 45 yards, 04:27.
- PITT – Scarton 44 yard field goal. Panthers 24–10. Drive: 11 plays 49 yards, 5:46.

Fourth quarter

- PITT – Scarton 34 yard field goal. Panthers 27–10. Drive: 11 plays, 64 yards, 5:48.
- CLEM – DJ Uiagalelei 6 yard rush, (Potter PAT), 07:56. Panthers 27–17. Drive: 5 plays, 72 yards, 1:28.

Top passers

- CLEM – DJ Uiagalelei: 12–25, 128 yards, 2 INTs
- PITT – Kenny Pickett: 25–39, 302 yards, 2 TDs

Top rushers

- CLEM – Will Shipley: 10 rushes, 52 yards
- PITT – Rodney Hammond Jr.: 11 rushes, 66 yards

Top Receiving

- CLEM – Justyn Ross: 5 receptions, 59 yards
- PITT – Jordan Addison: 5 receptions, 84 yards, 1 TD

=== Florida State ===
Florida State Seminoles at Clemson Tigers − Game summary

Quarter	1	2	3	4	Total
Florida State	6	7	0	7	20
Clemson	3	14	0	13	30

at Memorial Stadium • Clemson, SC

- Date: October 30, 2021
- Game time: 3:30 p.m.
- Game weather: Temperature: 63 °F (17 °C) • Wind: West @ 12 mph (19 km/h) • Weather: Cloudy
- Game attendance: 79,097
- Referee: Timothy Hedgepeth
- TV announcers (ESPN): Mark Jones (play-by-play), Robert Griffin III (analyst), Quint Kessenich (sideline)

Game information

First quarter

- CLEM – B. T. Potter 47 yard field goal, 5:32. Tigers 3–0. Drive: 10 plays, 46 yards, 3:32.
- FSU – Jashaun Corbin 1 yard pass from Jordan Travis, (extra point missed), 00:19. Seminoles 6–3. Drive: 10 plays, 75 yards, 5:13.

Second quarter

- CLEM – Davis Allen 11 yard pass from DJ Uiagalelei, (Potter PAT), 8:28. Tigers 10–6. Drive: 4 plays, 77 yards, 1:44.
- FSU – Lawrance Toafili 75 yard pass from Travis, (Ryan Fitzgerald PAT), 8:14. Seminoles 13–10. Drive: 1 play, 75 yards, 00:14.
- CLEM – Will Shipley 2 yard run, (Potter PAT), 3:41. Tigers 17–13. Drive: 10 plays, 83 yards, 4:28.

Third quarter

- None

Fourth quarter

- FSU – Jermaine Johnson II 6 yard fumble recovery, (Fizgerald PAT), 7:39. Seminoles 20–17.
- CLEM – Shipley 21 yard run, (Potter PAT), 2:53. Tigers 24–20. Drive: 3 plays, 58 yards, 00:55.
- CLEM – Barrett Carter 3 yard fumble recovery, (No PAT attempt), 00:00. Tigers 30–20.

Top passers

- CLEM – DJ Uiagalelei: 19–31, 189 yards, 1 TD, 1 INT
- FSU – Jordan Travis: 14–22, 176 yards, 2 TDs

Top rushers

- CLEM – Will Shipley: 25 rushes, 128 yards, 2 TDs
- FSU – Jashaun Corbin: 9 rushes, 31 yards

Top Receiving

- CLEM – Justyn Ross: 6 receptions, 85 yards
- FSU – Lawrance Toafili: 1 reception, 75 yards, 1 TD

=== At Louisville ===
Clemson Tigers at Louisville Cardinals − Game summary

Quarter	1	2	3	4	Total
Clemson	7	10	0	13	30
Louisville	14	3	7	0	24

at Cardinal Stadium • Louisville, KY

- Date: November 6, 2021
- Game time: 7:30 p.m.
- Game weather: Temperature: 51 °F (11 °C) • Wind: Calm • Weather: Cloudy
- Game attendance: 51,729
- Referee: Stuart Mullins
- TV announcers (ACCN): Dave O'Brien (play-by-play), Tim Hasselbeck (analyst), Kelsey Riggs (sideline)

Game information

First quarter

- LOU – Jalen Mitchell 26 yard run, (Jacquies Turner PAT), 12:08. Cardinals 7–0. Drive: 6 plays, 75 yards, 2:52.
- CLEM – Beaux Collins 46 yards pass from DJ Uiagalelei, (B. T. Potter PAT), 11:09. Tied 7–7. Drive: 3 plays, 75 yards, 0:53.
- LOU – Malik Cunningham 23 yard run, (Turner PAT), 1:16. Cardinals 14–7. Drive: 3 plays, 28 yards, 1:13.

Second quarter

- LOU – Turner 44 yard field goal, 10:32. Cardinals 17–7. Drive: 8 plays, 33 yards, 10:32.
- CLEM – Potter 38 yard field goal, 5:44. Cardinals 17–10. Drive: 10 plays, 54 yards, 4:48.
- CLEM – Davis Allen 8 yard pass from Uiagalelei, (Potter PAT), 0:18. Tied 17–17. Drive: 9 plays, 86 yards, 1:15.

Third quarter

- LOU – Cunningham 51 yard run, (Turner PAT), 11:29. Cardinals 24–17. Drive: 3 plays, 59 yards, 1:46.

Fourth quarter

- CLEM – Potter 34 yard field goal. Cardinals 24–20. Drive: 8 plays, 40 yards, 3:58.
- CLEM – Uiagalelei 8 yard run, (Potter PAT), 4:12. Tigers 27–24. Drive: 9 plays, 57 yards, 3:59.
- CLEM – Potter 40 yard field goal. Tigers 30–24. Drive: 4 plays, 2 yards, 0:16.

Top passers

- CLEM – DJ Uiagalelei: 18–30, 220 yards, 2 TDs
- LOU – Malik Cunningham: 12–20, 174 yards

Top rushers

- CLEM – Will Shipley: 14 rushes, 47 yards
- LOU – Malik Cunningham: 22 rushes, 134 yards, 2 TDs

Top Receiving

- CLEM – Beaux Collins: 6 receptions, 104 yards, 1 TD
- LOU – Tyler Harrell: 2 receptions, 76 yards

=== UConn ===
UConn Huskies at Clemson Tigers − Game summary

Quarter	1	2	3	4	Total
UConn	7	0	0	0	7
Clemson	10	20	7	7	44

at Memorial Stadium • Clemson, SC

- Date: November 13, 2021
- Game time: Noon
- Game weather: Temperature: 51 °F (11 °C) • Wind: West @ 9 mph (14 km/h) • Weather: Sunny
- Game attendance: 77,522
- Referee: Riley Johnson
- TV announcers (ACCN): Wes Durham (play-by-play), Roddy Jones (analyst), Taylor Davis (sideline)

Game information

First quarter

- UCONN – Brian Brewton 99 yard kickoff return, (Joe McFadden PAT), 11:45. Huskies 7–0.
- CLEM – B. T. Potter 49 yard field goal, 09:13. Huskies 7–3. Drive: 15 plays, 34 yards, 5:24.
- CLEM – Will Swinney 6 yard run, (Potter PAT), 3:03. Tigers 10–7. Drive: 11 plays, 78 yards, 3:46.

Second quarter

- CLEM – Taisun Phommachanh 3 yard run, (Potter PAT), 14:31. Tigers 17–7. Drive: 6 plays, 66 yards, 1:51.
- CLEM – Potter 49 yard field goal, 8:01. Tigers 20–7. Drive: 9 plays, 36 yards, 3:05.
- CLEM – Potter 30 yard field goal, 6:30. Tigers 23–7. Drive: 4 plays, 5 yards, 00:53.
- CLEM – Beaux Collins 32 yard pass from DJ Uiagalelei, (Potter PAT), 00:15. Tigers 30–7. Drive: 6 plays, 88 yards, 00:34.

Third quarter

- CLEM – Phil Mafah 2 yard run, (Potter PAT), 10:20. Tigers 37–7. Drive: 11 plays, 46 yards, 4:39.

Fourth quarter

- CLEM – Jake Briningstool 25 yard pass from Billy Wiles, (Jonathan Weitz PAT), 3:36. Tigers 44–7. Drive: 2 plays, 30 yards, 00:40.

Top passers

- CLEM – DJ Uiagalelei: 21–44, 241 yards, 1 TD, 1 INT
- UCONN – Jack Zergiotis: 9–21, 20 yards, 2 INTs

Top rushers

- CLEM – Phil Mafah: 17 rushes, 49 yards, 1 TD
- UCONN – Nate Carter: 5 rushes, 19 yards

Top Receiving

- CLEM – Dacari Collins: 6 receptions, 97 yards
- UCONN – Aaron Turner: 5 receptions, 59 yards

=== No. 10 Wake Forest ===
No. 10 Wake Forest Demon Deacons at Clemson Tigers − Game summary

Quarter	1	2	3	4	Total
No. 10 Wake Forest	0	10	3	14	27
Clemson	10	7	21	10	48

at Memorial Stadium • Clemson, SC

- Date: November 20, 2021
- Game time: Noon
- Game weather: Temperature: 48 °F (9 °C) • Wind: NE @ 9 mph (14 km/h) • Weather: Sunny
- Game attendance: 81,048
- Referee: Jeff Heaser
- TV announcers (ESPN): Roy Philpott (play-by-play), Greg McElroy (analyst), Alyssa Lang (sideline)

Game information

First quarter

- CLEM – B. T. Potter 50 yard field goal, 12:39. Tigers 3–0. Drive: 7 plays, 36 yards, 1:37.
- CLEM – Will Shipley 1 yard run, (Potter PAT), 6:41. Tigers 10–0. Drive: 9 plays, 77 yards, 4:06.

Second quarter

- WAKE – Nick Sciba 23 yard field goal, 10:21. Tigers 10–3. Drive: 14 plays, 81 yards, 4:28.
- CLEM – Davis Allen 2 yard pass from Shipley, (Potter PAT), 5:15. Tigers 17–3. Drive: 11 plays, 71 yards, 4:58.
- WAKE – Christian Turner 1 yard run, (Sciba PAT), 1:22. Tigers 17–10. Drive: 11 plays, 75 yards, 3:53.

Third quarter

- CLEM – Kobe Pace 8 yard run, (Potter PAT), 10:50. Tigers 24–10. Drive: 3 plays, 20 yards, 1:09.
- WAKE – Sciba 31 yard field goal, 8:08. Tigers 24–13. Drive: 7 plays, 62 yards, 2:42.
- CLEM – Beaux Collins 58 yard pass from DJ Uiagalelei, (Potter PAT), 5:36. Tigers 31–13. Drive: 5 plays, 75 yards, 2:32.
- CLEM – Pace 2 yard run, (Potter PAT), 3:38. Tigers 38–13. Drive: 5 plays, 20 yards, 1:53.

Fourth quarter

- WAKE – Quinton Cooley 7 yard run, (2 point attempt failed), 14:55. Tigers 38–19. Drive: 10 plays, 75 yards, 7:41.
- CLEM – Potter 35 yard field goal, 7:14. Tigers 41–19. Drive 11 plays, 57 yards, 7:41.
- WAKE – Blake Whiteheart 6 yard pass from Sam Hartman, (2 point attempt good), 4:50. Tigers 41–27. Drive: 10 plays, 75 yards, 2:24.
- CLEM – Shipley 3 yard run, (Potter PAT), 2:19. Tigers 48–27. Drive 4 plays, 43 yards, 2:30.

Top passers

- CLEM – DJ Uiagalelei: 11–19, 208 yards, 1 TD, 1 INT
- WAKE – Sam Hartman: 27–43, 312 yards, 1 TD, 1 INT

Top rushers

- CLEM – Kobe Pace: 24 rushes, 191 yards, 2 TDs
- WAKE – Quinton Cooley: 8 rushes, 39 yards, 1 TD

Top Receiving

- CLEM – Beaux Collins: 4 receptions, 137 yards, 1 TD
- WAKE – A. T. Perry: 5 receptions, 113 yards

=== At South Carolina ===
No. 23 Clemson Tigers at South Carolina Gamecocks − Game summary

Quarter	1	2	3	4	Total
No. 23 Clemson	10	7	3	10	30
South Carolina	0	0	0	0	0

at Williams–Brice Stadium • Columbia, SC

- Date: November 27, 2021
- Game time: 7:30 p.m.
- Game weather: Temperature: 47 °F (8 °C) • Wind: South @ 2 mph (3.2 km/h) • Weather: Sunny
- Game attendance: 79,897
- Referee: Jerry Magallanes
- TV announcers (SECN): Taylor Zarzour (play-by-play), Matt Stinchcomb (analyst) and Alyssa Lang (sideline)

Game information

First quarter

- CLEM – Will Shipley 29 yard rush, (B. T. Potter PAT), 11:44. Tigers 7–0. Drive: 7 plays, 73 yards, 3:11.
- CLEM – Potter 29 yard field goal, 2:40. Tigers 10–0. Drive: 4 plays, 1 yard, 1:22.

Second quarter

- CLEM – Kobe Pace 34 yard run, (Potter PAT), 12:10. Tigers 17–0. Drive: 7 plays, 79 yards, 3:08.

Third quarter

- CLEM – Potter 47 yard field goal, 9:05. Tigers 20–0. Drive: 9 plays, 34 yards, 4:05.

Fourth quarter

- CLEM – Potter 49 yard field goal, 12:24. Tigers 23–0. Drive: 6 plays, 27 yards, 3:41.
- CLEM – Phil Mafah 6 yard run, (Potter PAT), 2:30. Tigers 30–0. Drive: 6 plays, 25 yards, 3:13.

Top passers

- CLEM – DJ Uiagalelei: 9–19, 99 yards, 1 INT
- SC – Zeb Noland: 11–22, 96 yards

Top rushers

- CLEM – Will Shipley: 19 rushes, 128 yards, 1 TD
- SC – Zaquandre White: 7 rushes, 22 yards

Top Receiving

- CLEM – Dacari Collins: 2 receptions, 50 yards
- SC – Josh Vann: 4 receptions, 38 yards

=== vs. Iowa State ===
No. 19 Clemson Tigers vs Iowa State Cyclones (Cheez-It Bowl) − Game summary

Quarter	1	2	3	4	Total
No. 19 Clemson	3	3	14	0	20
Iowa State	0	3	3	7	13

at Camping World Stadium • Orlando, Florida

- Date: December 29, 2021
- Game time: 5:45 p.m.
- Game weather: Temperature: 78 °F (26 °C) • Wind: SW @ 5 mph (8.0 km/h) • Weather: Partly Cloudy
- Game attendance: 39,051
- Referee: Chris Coyte
- TV announcers (ESPN): Dave Pasch (play-by-play), Dusty Dvoracek (analyst), and Tom Luginbill (sideline)

Game information

First quarter

- CLEM – B. T. Potter 23 yard field goal, 6:52. Tigers 3–0. Drive: 15 plays, 69 yards, 8:08.

Second quarter

- ISU – Andrew Mevis 22 yard field goal, 11:25. Tied 3–3. Drive: 11 plays, 78 yards, 5:42.
- CLEM – Potter 51 yard field goal, 4:07. Tigers 6–3. Drive: 8 plays, 41 yards, 4:07.

Third quarter

- CLEM – Will Shipley 12 yard run, (Potter PAT), 4:54. Tigers 13–3. Drive: 16 plays, 79 yards, 7:39.
- CLEM – Mario Goodrich 18 yard interception return, (Potter PAT), 4:01. Tigers 20–3.
- ISU – Mevis 45 yard field goal, 1:23. Tigers 20–6. Drive: 4 plays, 0 yards, 1:04.

Fourth quarter

- ISU – Brock Purdy 6 yard pass to Charlie Kolar, (Mevis PAT), 9:42. Tigers 20–13. Drive: 8 plays, 63 yards, 5:18.

Top passers

- ISU – Brock Purdy: 23–39, 204 yards, 1 TD, 1 INT
- CLEM – DJ Uiagalelei: 21–32, 187 yards, 1 INT

Top rushers

- ISU – Jirehl Brock: 14 rushes, 42 yards
- CLEM – Will Shipley: 18 rushes, 61 yards, 1 TD

Top Receiving

- ISU – Jaylin Noel: 4 receptions, 54 yards
- CLEM – Dacari Collins: 6 receptions, 56 yards

== Awards and honors ==
All-ACC
Player	Position	Team
Tyler Davis	DT	First Team
James Skalski	LB	First Team
Mario Goodrich	CB	First Team
Andrew Booth Jr.	CB	First Team
Jordan McFadden	OT	Second Team
Myles Murphy	DE	Second Team
B. T. Potter	PK	Second Team
Xavier Thomas	DE	Third Team
Bryan Bresee	DT	Third Team
Andrew Mukuba	S	Third Team
Davis Allen	TE	Honorable Mention
Will Shipley	AP	Honorable Mention
Will Putnam	OG	Honorable Mention
Baylon Spector	LB	Honorable Mention
Nolan Turner	S	Honorable Mention
Will Spiers	P	Honorable Mention

== Players drafted into the NFL ==
Round	Pick	Player	Position	NFL club
2	42	Andrew Booth Jr.	CB	Minnesota Vikings
7	231	Baylon Spector	LB	Buffalo Bills
