= Dabo Swinney =

American football coach (born 1969)

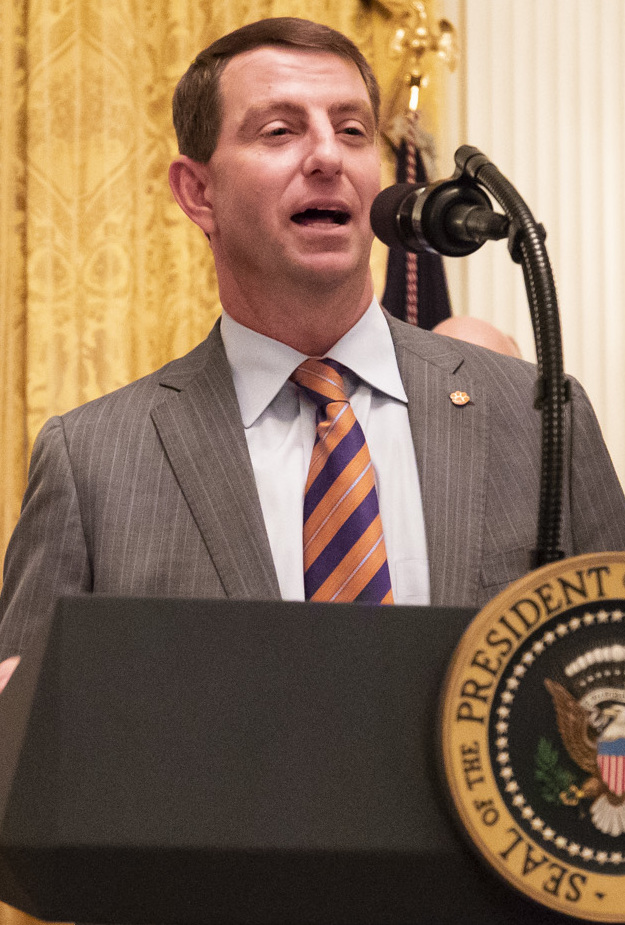
- Swinney in 2019

Current position
- Title: Head coach
- Team: Clemson
- Conference: ACC
- Record: 194–57

Biographical details
- Born: November 20, 1969 (age 57); Birmingham, Alabama, U.S.

Playing career
- 1990–1992: Alabama
- Position: Wide receiver

Coaching career (HC unless noted)
- 1993–1995: Alabama (GA)
- 1996: Alabama (WR/TE)
- 1997: Alabama (TE)
- 1998–2000: Alabama (WR)
- 2003–2006: Clemson (WR/RC)
- 2007–2008: Clemson (AHC/WR/RC)
- 2008: Clemson (interim HC/OC)
- 2009–present: Clemson

Head coaching record
- Overall: 194–57
- Bowls: 12–10
- Tournaments: 6–5 (CFP)

Accomplishments and honors

Championships
- 2 National (2016, 2018); 9 ACC (2011, 2015–2020, 2022, 2024); 10 ACC Atlantic Division (2009, 2011, 2012, 2015–2020, 2022)

Awards
- 3× Paul "Bear" Bryant Award (2015, 2016, 2018); AFCA Coach of the Year (2015); AP College Football Coach of the Year (2015); Sporting News Coach of the Year (2015); Home Depot Coach of the Year (2015); Bobby Dodd Coach of the Year (2011); Walter Camp Coach of the Year (2015); George Munger Award (2015); Woody Hayes Trophy Coach of the Year (2018); 2× ACC Coach of the Year (2015, 2018)

William Christopher "Dabo" Swinney (/ˈdæboʊ ˈswiːniː/; born November 20, 1969) is an American college football coach, currently serving as the head football coach at Clemson University. Swinney took over as head coach of the Clemson Tigers seven games into the 2008 season, following the resignation of Tommy Bowden. Swinney's team won national championships in 2016 and 2018. He is the winningest head coach in Clemson football history and Atlantic Coast Conference (ACC) football history.

== Early life and education ==
Swinney's parents, Carol McIntosh and Ervil Swinney, married shortly after Carol's high school graduation. The couple had three boys: Tracy, Tripp, and William (Dabo).

Although born in Birmingham, Swinney was raised in Pelham. He attended Pelham High School, where he played a number of sports, including baseball and football.

Facing financial troubles after his parents divorced, Swinney and his mother were temporarily homeless and lived with various friends for a period of time. Nevertheless, Swinney was an honor student and continued to excel in football.

His high school coach encouraged Swinney to pursue basketball at a number of colleges; however, Swinney insisted on the University of Alabama—his father's favorite football team—once he learned that he was admissible. Swinney once revealed, "I didn't know what a Pell Grant was, and I didn't know how to do student loans. I had no clue. I had no collegiate background in my family of how to do that type of stuff."

While in college, his mother stayed with him and a classmate in an off-campus apartment for three years until she could afford her own home. Swinney worked a number of low wage jobs during the summer of his sophomore year in order to pay for tuition, rent, and other expenses. That fall, he received a notice that he owed the university $550 that was due the next day or his classes would be dropped and he would be disqualified from the football team. That same day he opened a credit line with Discover credit card, which allowed him to pay the outstanding balance along with his rent.

Swinney is a first-generation college student who was involved in Greek Life during college, and was initiated as a brother of the Pi Kappa Alpha fraternity. He received his bachelor's degree in commerce & business administration in 1993 and two years later, he earned a master's degree in Business Administration from the same university. At one point, his career goals included being a doctor and running a hospital.

== Playing career ==
Swinney joined the Alabama Crimson Tide as a walk-on wide receiver in 1989. He earned a scholarship and lettered on three teams (1990–1992), including the Crimson Tide's 1992 National Championship team. During his time as an undergraduate at Alabama, Swinney was twice named an Academic All-SEC and SEC Scholar Athlete Honor Roll member. In three seasons at Alabama, he caught seven passes for 81 yards.

== Coaching career ==
=== Alabama ===
While completing work on his MBA, Swinney served as a graduate assistant at Alabama under Gene Stallings.

In December 1995, Swinney received his MBA from Alabama and became a full-time assistant coach for the Crimson Tide in charge of wide receivers and tight ends. He retained these posts under Stallings' successor, Mike DuBose. He was fired with all of DuBose's staff in early 2001 following a 3–8 season.

Swinney sat out the 2001 season while receiving his contractual payments from Alabama. His former strength coach at Alabama, Rich Wingo, had become president of Birmingham-based AIG Baker Real Estate and offered him a job. From April 2001 through February 2003, he did not coach and instead worked for AIG Baker Real Estate as a commercial real estate salesman.

=== Clemson ===
In 2002, Tommy Bowden—Swinney's former position coach at Alabama— offered him the position of wide receivers coach at Clemson, and Swinney joined in 2003. He also took over as recruiting coordinator from popular longtime coordinator Rick Stockstill. Swinney proved to be both an excellent wide receivers coach as well as recruiting coordinator, coaching ACC-leading receivers and being named one of the nation's top 25 recruiters in 2007 by Rivals.com.

==== 2008 season ====
Swinney was named the interim head football coach on October 13, 2008, after head coach Tommy Bowden resigned six games into the season. The Tigers had started the year ranked #9 in the preseason polls, but then went 3–3 (1–2 ACC) in their first six games. At the time he was informed of his promotion, he was working with the wide receivers on their upcoming game.

With a reputation as a top-notch recruiter, Swinney was chosen over Clemson defensive coordinator Vic Koenning (former head coach of Wyoming), and associate head coach Brad Scott (former head coach of South Carolina). Swinney's first actions as interim head coach were to fire offensive coordinator Rob Spence and introduce a new tradition, the "Tiger Walk", where all players and coaches walk through the parking lot outside Memorial Stadium about two hours before a game as they head inside for final game preparations. On October 18, in his first game as interim head coach, the team lost to Georgia Tech 21–17. On November 1, 2008, Swinney claimed his first victory as the Tigers' head coach by defeating Boston College, breaking Clemson's six-game losing streak against the Eagles. On November 29, 2008, Swinney coached Clemson to a 31–14 win over South Carolina in the annual rivalry game, after which Clemson became bowl eligible. After a vote of confidence from athletic director Terry Don Phillips, Swinney was formally named as Clemson's 27th head coach on December 1, 2008. In his first game as the full-time head coach, he lost the 2009 Gator Bowl to the Nebraska Cornhuskers 26–21.

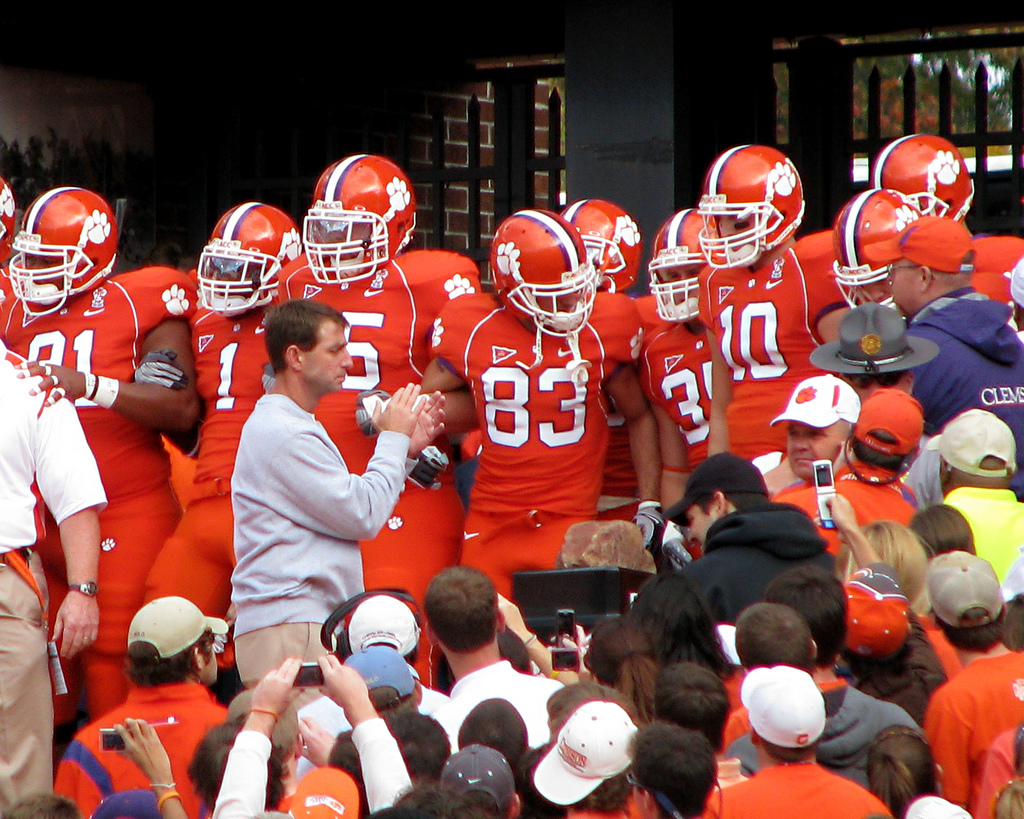
Swinney leading Clemson onto the field prior to a 2008 game.

Swinney's recruiting reputation became evident when he produced five top-20 ESPN recruiting classes in a row, including top 10 classes in 2011 and 2012. As a result, Clemson was one of only 10 schools to be ranked in the top 20 of recruiting five years in a row (along with LSU, Alabama, Texas, USC, Florida, Georgia, Florida State, Ohio State, and Oklahoma), and as of 2014 Swinney was one of only four active head coaches at the time to accomplish the feat (along with Nick Saban, Les Miles, and Bob Stoops).

Despite his recruiting reputation, Swinney was an unpopular hire among some Clemson fans. Some fans and pundits noted that he had never been more than a position coach. Others were skeptical that Clemson had opted to retain one of Bowden's assistants.

==== 2009 season ====
During the 2009 season, which was Swinney's first full season at the helm, Clemson achieved several accomplishments. The 2009 team finished the season with a record of 9–5 (6–2 in ACC) to win the Atlantic Division title of the Atlantic Coast Conference. The 2009 season included three marquee wins: a win over #8 Miami (FL) in overtime on the road, a 16-point win over Florida State at home, and a win over Kentucky 21–13 in the 2009 Music City Bowl. Swinney coached the Clemson Tigers to a #24 AP Top 25 final season ranking for the 2009 football season.

==== 2010 season ====
In 2010, Swinney led Clemson to a 6–6 (4–4 in ACC) regular season. Of the six losses in the 2010 season, five were by less than 10 points and four were by six points or less. The season included close losses to Cam Newton and the eventual national champion Auburn Tigers (27–24 on the road in OT), and the eventual division champion Florida State Seminoles (16–13 on a 55-yard, time-expiring field goal on the road). After the conclusion of the regular season, many fans called for the firing of both Swinney and athletic director Terry Don Phillips. Swinney would say years later he expected to be fired after the regular season ended with a loss to South Carolina. Phillips instead gave Swinney another vote of confidence and allowed him to return for the 2011 season. Discontent with Swinney grew even more after a bowl loss to South Florida made Clemson's final record 6–7, Clemson's first losing season since 1998. Swinney, who was 19–15, entered the 2011 season widely considered to be a coach on the hot seat. Despite a disappointing 6–7 record, the 2010 team featured one of the nation's top defenses and the Bronko Nagurski Trophy and Ted Hendricks Award winner, Da'Quan Bowers.

==== 2011 season ====
In 2011, Swinney led the Tigers to a 10–3 record that included an ACC Championship, the Tigers' first since 1991. They earned a trip to the Orange Bowl, their first major-bowl appearance since the 1981 national championship season. During a pre-game ESPN interview prior to the 2012 Orange Bowl, Swinney said, "Hopefully when this thing is over, people are going to be talking about the Clemson defense." The comment proved to be prescient as #15 Clemson went on to lose to the #23 West Virginia Mountaineers, 70–33, conceding an all-time record number of points scored in a quarter (35), half (49) and game (70) in the 109-year history of bowl games. Defensive coordinator Kevin Steele was fired after the game.

A notable addition to the Clemson coaching staff in 2011 was offensive coordinator Chad Morris, who had previously only coached at the high school level. Morris brought in a fast-paced, up-tempo spread offense that shattered many Clemson offensive records and influenced other coordinators around the country and in the NFL.

Swinney was the 2011 winner of the Bobby Dodd Coach of the Year Award, which was established to honor the NCAA Division 1 football coach whose team excels on the field, in the classroom, and in the community. The award is named for Bobby Dodd, longtime head football coach of the Georgia Tech Yellow Jackets. The award was established in 1976 to honor the values that Dodd exemplified.

==== 2012 season ====
Swinney and Clemson started off the 2012 season with a 3–0 start. The Tigers suffered their first setback against #4 Florida State 49–37 in the season's fourth game. The team reeled off seven consecutive wins before falling to rival #13 South Carolina 27–17. In 2012, Swinney led Clemson to its first 11-win season since the 1981 national championship year, capping the year off with an upset 25–24 victory over the #8 LSU Tigers in the Chick-fil-A Bowl. The Tigers finished the year at 11–2 and ranked 11th in the AP Poll. Swinney was a finalist for the third time in his career for the Liberty Mutual National Coach of the Year.

==== 2013 season ====
In 2013, Swinney guided the Tigers to their third 10-win season in a row, their first since 1989. The highlight regular-season win came against #5 Georgia in the season opener. The Tigers won 38–35. Clemson's two regular season losses were to top 10 opponents, national champion Florida State and South Carolina. The 31–17 loss to the rival Gamecocks was a record fifth straight for the Tigers, the longest winning streak for South Carolina in the series, while the 51–14 loss to Florida State was the worst home loss in the history of the Clemson football program and tied with the 2012 Orange Bowl for Clemson's most lopsided loss under Dabo Swinney. The completion of the season marked 32 wins over three years for Swinney, the most ever in such a span in Clemson football history. The Tigers received their second BCS bowl bid under Swinney with an invitation to play seventh-ranked Ohio State in the 2014 Orange Bowl. The Tigers defeated the Buckeyes 40–35 to give the Tigers' their third Orange Bowl win in their history and their first BCS bowl victory. The 2013 season marked the first time Clemson had back-to-back 11-win seasons. After the game, Swinney recalled the Tigers' lopsided loss two years before in the Orange Bowl and the team's journey since then. "Hey, listen: Two years ago we got our butts kicked on this field. And it has been a journey to get back. We're 22–4 since that night. And we are the first team from the state of South Carolina to ever win a BCS game," Swinney said. The win was Swinney's fourth victory over a top ten opponent as a head coach. The Tigers finished the season ranked in the top 10 in both polls (#8 in AP, #7 in Coaches), the first such achievement for Swinney as head coach.

Following the season, Swinney agreed to eight-year, $27.15 million contract and guaranteed if Swinney was fired in the next three years.

==== 2014 season ====
Under Swinney, Clemson had their fourth 10-win season in a row, making them one of only four schools to achieve the feat in the last four seasons. The Tigers started the season ranked #16 but suffered early setbacks with losses to #13 Georgia and #1 Florida State. However, with the emergence of freshman quarterback Deshaun Watson, the Tigers only lost one more game to ACC Coastal Division Champion Georgia Tech, which Watson started but did not finish due to injury. The regular season was highlighted with the finale against South Carolina in which Clemson broke a five-game losing streak to the Gamecocks to win 35–17 in Death Valley. Clemson received an invitation to play Oklahoma in the Russell Athletic Bowl on December 29, 2014. Led by Clemson's #1 ranked defense in the nation, the Tigers routed the Sooners 40–6, holding Oklahoma to 275 total yards and forcing five turnovers. Ironically, defensive coordinator Brent Venables had held the same position with the Sooners until coming to Clemson in 2012. The Tigers finished 10–3 for the season and ranked 15th in both the AP and the Coaches Poll.

Swinney's last three bowl wins have been over college programs that have all won national titles since 2000.

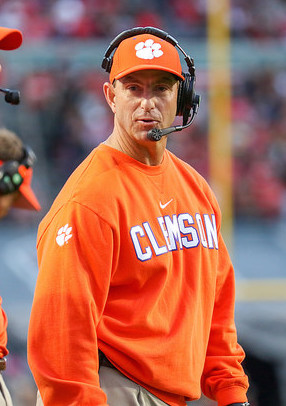
Swinney in 2015

==== 2015 season ====
Swinney completed his then best season as Clemson's head coach in 2015, leading the Tigers to a 14–1 record with an ACC Championship and an appearance in the national championship game. The Tigers defeated #8 North Carolina 45–37 to win their 15th ACC Championship. Clemson defeated #4 Oklahoma 37–17 in the College Football Playoff Semifinals at the Orange Bowl to face off in the National Championship. Clemson fell short to Alabama in the title game 45–40 after Nick Saban, the head coach of Alabama, surprised Clemson with a successful onside kick. The season marked Clemson's best run since the 1981 national championship season. Swinney was named ACC Coach of the Year, AFCA Coach of the Year, Associated Press Coach of Year, Walter Camp Coach of the Year, Home Depot Coach of the Year, and the Paul "Bear" Bryant Award. The 2015 Tigers set a record for single-season wins under Swinney with 14. Clemson ended the season ranked #2 in both the Associated Press and Coaches Polls.

==== 2016 season ====
On April 12, 2016, Swinney signed a six-year contract extension with the Tigers. Swinney once again recorded a banner season as Clemson's coach, leading the Tigers to a 12–1 regular season record and another ACC Championship, the third in Swinney's career. Clemson posted big wins during the 2016 season over #3 Louisville at home and #12 Florida State on the road. Their only loss of the year was to the Pitt Panthers, losing on a last second field goal and snapping their 15-game home winning streak. Swinney punctuated the regular season with a 56–7 home victory over arch-rival South Carolina, the largest margin of victory over the Gamecocks in Swinney's career and the largest in over 100 years in the history of the storied rivalry. Following Clemson's ACC Championship win over #19 Virginia Tech, the Tigers secured the #2 seed in the College Football Playoff. On December 31, in the College Football Playoff Semifinals at the Fiesta Bowl, Swinney and the Tigers defeated #3 Ohio State 31–0 in Ohio State head coach Urban Meyer's first career shut-out to set up a rematch of the 2015 National Championship against #1 Alabama. On January 9, 2017, Swinney led the Tigers to a 35–31 comeback win over Alabama to capture the national championship. The victory gave Clemson their first national championship since the 1981 season. For the second time, Swinney earned the Bear Bryant Coach of the Year Award.

==== 2017 season ====
Coming off of the national championship season from the year before, Clemson and Swinney looked to fill big shoes with the loss of many offensive starters, including standout quarterback Deshaun Watson who entered the NFL Draft. However, the Tigers once again rose to national prominence with a 12–1 regular season record and their third ACC Championship in a row. Clemson dominated #7 Miami 38–3 in the ACC Championship and secured the #1 seed in the College Football Playoffs. The Tigers posted big wins in the season with a 14–6 win over #13 Auburn, a 47–21 victory over #14 Louisville, and a 31–17 win over #12 Virginia Tech. Later in the season, Swinney earned his 97th career win at Clemson, vaulting him past Danny Ford to become the second-winningest coach in school history.

Swinney capped off the regular season with another convincing win over rival South Carolina, 34–10, marking his fourth win in a row over the Gamecocks. The Tigers faced #4 Alabama in the Sugar Bowl for the first round of the College Football Playoffs. Alabama defeated Clemson 24–6. Clemson finished #4 overall in the final standings and were ranked in the top 10 throughout the entire 2017 season.

==== 2018 season ====
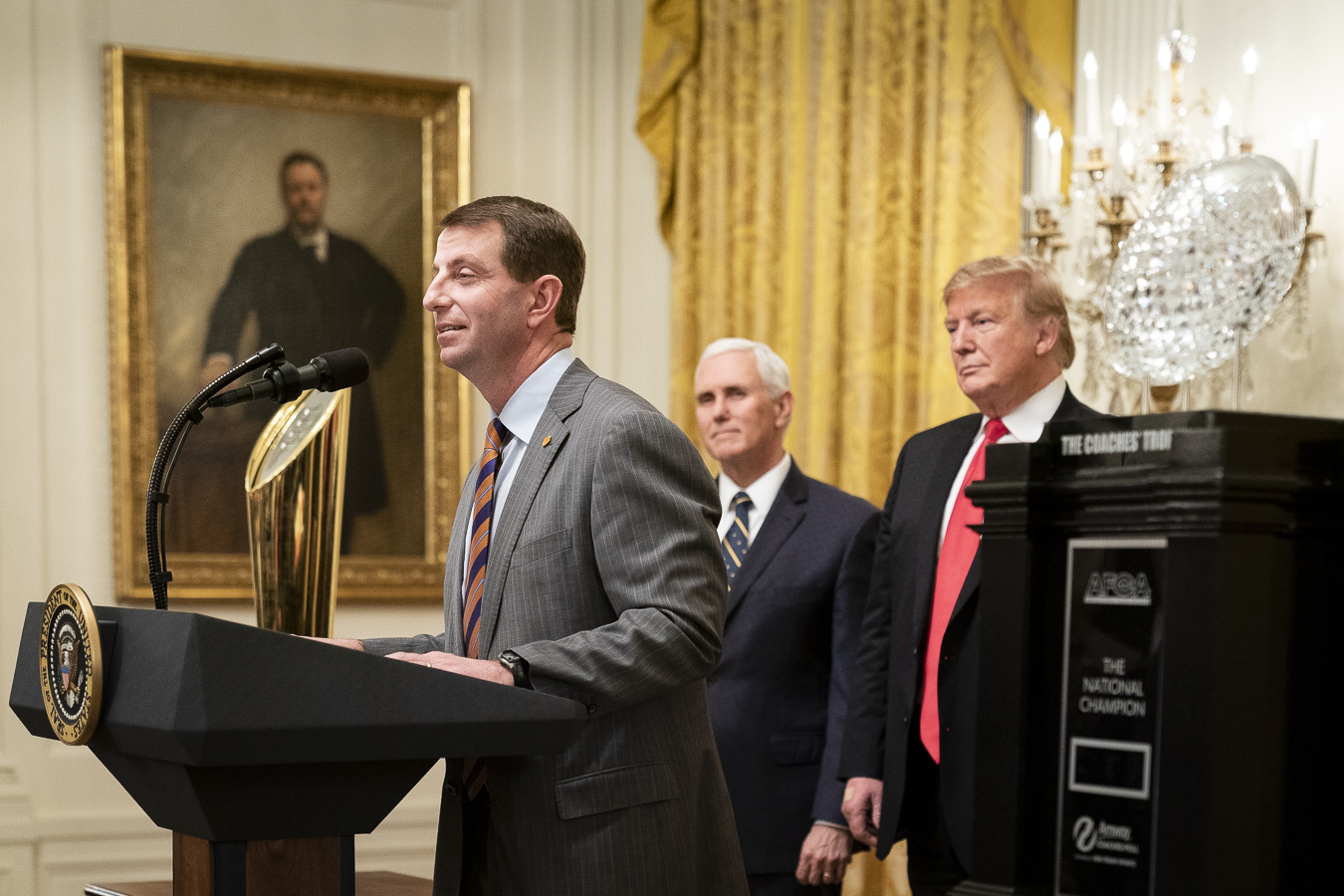
Swinney at the White House in 2019 after winning the 2019 College Football Playoff National Championship

Clemson started off the 2018 season ranked second in the nation in the AP Poll and Coaches Poll. The 2018 Tigers opened the season with a 48–7 victory over Furman. Clemson survived a close 28–26 result in the following game against Texas A&M. Following a 38–7 victory over Georgia Southern, Clemson opened ACC play with a 49–21 victory over Georgia Tech. Following a 27–23 victory over Syracuse, Clemson defeated Wake Forest 63–3. In the following game against #16 NC State, Clemson won 41–17. Clemson dominated in their next two games, a 59–10 victory over Florida State and a 77–16 victory over Louisville. Clemson closed out the regular season with victories over #17 Boston College, Duke, and South Carolina. Clemson qualified for the ACC Championship and defeated Pitt 42–10 to win their fourth consecutive conference championship.

Clemson qualified for the College Football Playoff as the #2-seed. In the College Football Playoff Semifinals, the Tigers faced off against undefeated #3 Notre Dame in the Cotton Bowl and won 30–3. Clemson finished the season undefeated and won the 2019 College Football Playoff national championship, defeating Alabama 44–16 to win the school their third national championship and Swinney's second. Clemson was the first team to go 15–0 in modern history and the first in college football history since the 1897 Penn Quakers football team, which led some pundits to say that the 2018 Tigers are the greatest college football team of all time. Swinney was named ACC Coach of the Year and the Bear Bryant Coach of the Year for the 2018 season.

==== 2019 season ====
Swinney's 2019 Tigers picked up where the previous year's team left off, running the table, including wins over Southeastern Conference opponents Texas A&M and South Carolina. The one close call came in Clemson's fifth game, a 21–20 road win over Mack Brown's North Carolina Tar Heels. They won their final seven regular season games by an average scoring margin of 41.7 points, and their streak of six straight wins by 35 points or more is the longest such streak of the modern era. The 2019 Tigers held all twelve of their regular season opponents under 300 yards of total offense, and they finished the season allowing the fewest points (10.6) and yards (244.7) per game in the country. Swinney won his fifth straight ACC Championship (and sixth overall) with a dismantling of Virginia in the championship game (although they were unable to hold Virginia under 300 yards of total offense [387]). The 62–17 final score brought the above-mentioned streak to seven. On December 8, 2019, Clemson was named the No. 3 seed in the College Football Playoff and slated to meet No. 2-seed Ohio State in the College Football Playoff Semifinal at the Fiesta Bowl. They defeated the Buckeyes, 29–23, to advance to the College Football Playoff National Championship on January 13, 2020. They lost the national title game to the LSU Tigers by a score of 42–25. LSU's victory snapped a 29-game winning streak for Clemson. The streak was tied for the longest in ACC history.

==== 2020 season ====
The 2020 Tigers played a shortened schedule due to the COVID-19 pandemic. The Tigers opened the 2020 season as the top-ranked team in the nation in the AP Poll and Coaches Poll. The Tigers started the season with a 7–0 record. On November 7, Clemson lost to #4 Notre Dame on the road in double overtime without Trevor Lawrence, who missed the game due to COVID-19 protocols. Following the loss, Clemson won their last two games to finish 9–1. The Tigers avenged their earlier loss, beating Notre Dame in the ACC Championship Game 34–10 to secure a sixth straight conference crown and a tenth win for a tenth straight season. The season ended with a loss in the 2021 Sugar Bowl, the College Football Playoff Semifinal, to the Ohio State by a score of 49–28.

==== 2021 season ====
Swinney and Clemson started off the 2021 season ranked third in the AP Poll. The Tigers suffered an early setback with a 10–3 loss to #5 Georgia. Following a 49–3 win over South Carolina State and a narrow 14–8 win over Georgia Tech, Clemson suffered a 27–21 loss to North Carolina State to drop to #25 in the poll. Following a close victory over Boston College, Clemson dropped out of the Top 25 for the first time since 2014. Following a 17–14 victory over Syracuse and a 27–17 loss to #23 Pitt, Clemson went on a five-game winning streak to close out the regular season. In that stretch was a 48–27 victory over #13 Wake Forest. Clemson returned to the Top 25 ranking for their bowl game. In the 2021 season, Swinney led the Tigers to a 10–3 record that culminated with a 20–13 victory over Iowa State in the Cheez-It Bowl and a final ranking of #14.

==== 2022 season ====
On September 8, 2022, Swinney signed a contract extension through 2031 worth $115 million. The Tigers recorded an 8–0 start and a #5 ranking before falling to Notre Dame 35–14 on November 5. The Tigers remained in contention for the College Football Playoff until the regular season finale against rival South Carolina, where the Tigers lost 31–30. The loss to the Gamecocks marked the first for Clemson in the rivalry since 2013. The Tigers won the ACC Championship over #24 North Carolina 39–10. The Tigers ended up in the Orange Bowl, where they lost 31–14 to #6 Tennessee. In the 2022 season, Swinney led the Tigers to an 11–3 record. For Swinney, the 2022 season marked Clemson's 12th consecutive campaign with at least ten wins, joining Bobby Bowden and Nick Saban as the only coaches to accomplish the feat.

==== 2023 season ====
Swinney and the Tigers started the 2023 season with #9 ranking in the AP Poll. The team dropped the season opener to Duke in a 28–7 loss. Clemson won their next two games over Charleston Southern and FAU before dropping a 31–24 overtime result to #4 Florida State. Tigers split their next four games to sit at 4–4. Swinney led the team to a five-game winning streak to close out the season. The winning streak saw ranked victories over Notre Dame and North Carolina to go with a Gator Bowl victory over Kentucky.

During the season, Swinney won his 166th game at Clemson, vaulting him past Hall of Famer Frank Howard to become the winningest coach in school history.

==== 2024 season ====
Swinney and the Tigers started the 2024 season with a #14 ranking in the AP Poll. The Tigers finished with a 9–3 regular season mark that qualified them for the ACC Championship. The Tigers defeated SMU 34–31 in the ACC Championship Game. Swinney led the Tigers to an appearance in the College Football Playoff as the 12-seed. The Tigers lost to Texas in the first round 38–24.

==== 2025 season ====
Swinney and the Tigers started the 2025 season with a #4 ranking in the AP Poll. Clemson struggled with a 1–3 start to the season with losses to #9 LSU, Georgia Tech, and Syracuse. The Tigers split their next four games to get to 3–5. The Tigers won four consecutive games to qualify for the Pinstripe Bowl, which they lost 22–10 to Penn State. The seven wins marked the fewest for Swinney at Clemson since the 2010 season.

== Personal life ==
Swinney's nickname "Dabo" was given to him as an infant by his brother, Tripp, who would try to enunciate "that boy" when referring to Swinney.

Swinney converted to Christianity when he was 16 years old, saying, "And that was a game-changer for me. That's really become the foundation of my life." Swinney has also said, "Coaching makes some of the things I've experienced in my life make sense to me. It allows me to use my life experiences to impact young people and to serve God through what I do. I'm very passionate about seeing young people graduate, mature and develop.". Swinney attends NewSpring Church and often brings players and recruits with him to church. He was friends with former Newspring pastor Perry Noble since 2007, but their relationship changed when Noble was fired due to alcohol abuse in July 2016.

He is married to his high school sweetheart Kathleen Swinney, with whom he has three sons, and resides in Clemson, South Carolina.

== Head coaching record ==
| Year | Team | Overall | Conference | Standing | Bowl/playoffs | Coaches^{#} | AP^{°} |
|---|---|---|---|---|---|---|---|
Clemson Tigers (Atlantic Coast Conference) (2008–present)
| 2008 | Clemson | 4–3 (Note: Took over midseason from Tommy Bowden, who resigned on October 13, 2008) | 3–2 | T–3rd (Atlantic) | L Gator | | |
| 2009 | Clemson | 9–5 | 6–2 | 1st (Atlantic) | W Music City | | 24 |
| 2010 | Clemson | 6–7 | 4–4 | T–4th (Atlantic) | L Meineke Car Care | | |
| 2011 | Clemson | 10–4 | 6–2 | 1st (Atlantic) | L Orange^{†} | 22 | 22 |
| 2012 | Clemson | 11–2 | 7–1 | T–1st (Atlantic) | W Chick-fil-A | 9 | 11 |
| 2013 | Clemson | 11–2 | 7–1 | 2nd (Atlantic) | W Orange^{†} | 7 | 8 |
| 2014 | Clemson | 10–3 | 6–2 | 2nd (Atlantic) | W Russell Athletic | 15 | 15 |
| 2015 | Clemson | 14–1 | 8–0 | 1st (Atlantic) | W Orange^{†}, L CFP NCG^{†} | 2 | 2 |
| 2016 | Clemson | 14–1 | 7–1 | 1st (Atlantic) | W Fiesta^{†}, W CFP NCG^{†} | 1 | 1 |
| 2017 | Clemson | 12–2 | 7–1 | 1st (Atlantic) | L Sugar^{†} | 4 | 4 |
| 2018 | Clemson | 15–0 | 8–0 | 1st (Atlantic) | W Cotton^{†}, W CFP NCG^{†} | 1 | 1 |
| 2019 | Clemson | 14–1 | 8–0 | 1st (Atlantic) | W Fiesta^{†}, L CFP NCG^{†} | 2 | 2 |
| 2020 | Clemson | 10–2 | 8–1 | 2nd | L Sugar^{†} | 3 | 3 |
| 2021 | Clemson | 10–3 | 6–2 | T–2nd (Atlantic) | W Cheez-It | 16 | 14 |
| 2022 | Clemson | 11–3 | 8–0 | 1st (Atlantic) | L Orange^{†} | 12 | 13 |
| 2023 | Clemson | 9–4 | 4–4 | T–6th | W Gator | 20 | 20 |
| 2024 | Clemson | 10–4 | 7–1 | 2nd | L CFP First Round^{†} | 11 | 14 |
| 2025 | Clemson | 7–6 | 4–4 | T–7th | L Pinstripe | | |
| 2026 | Clemson | 7–4 | 5–3 | | | | |
| Clemson: | | 194-57 | 119–31 | | | | |
| Total: | | 194–57 | | | | | |
National championship Conference title Conference division title or championship game berth
^{†}Indicates BCS or CFP / New Years' Six bowl.; ^{#}Rankings from final Coaches Poll.; ^{°}Rankings from final AP Poll.
