= 2021 Cheez-It Bowl =

American college football game

- 32nd Cheez-It Bowl
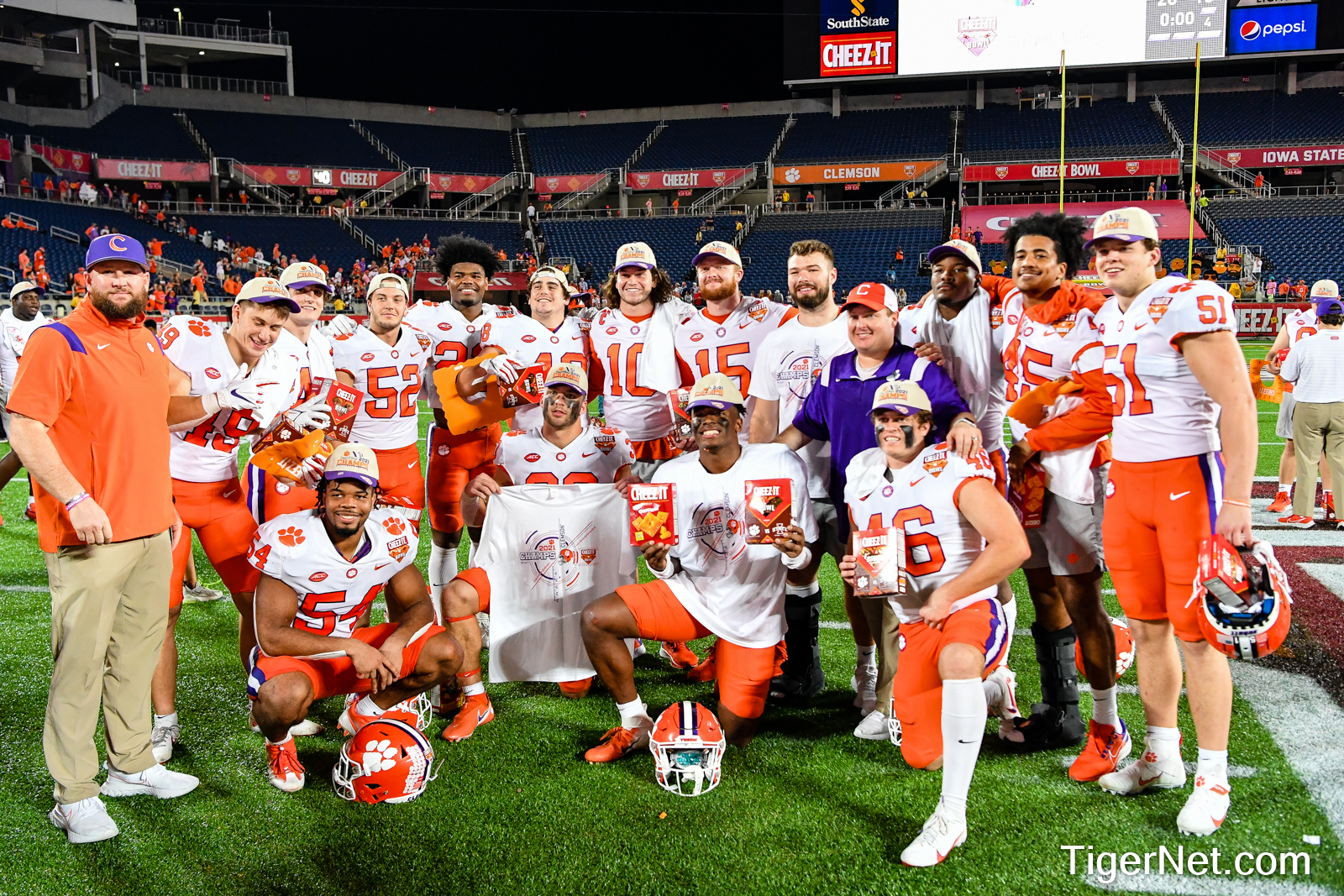
- Clemson players celebrate after the win
Clemson Tigers	Iowa State Cyclones
(9–3)	(7–5)
ACC	Big 12
20	13
Head coach: Dabo Swinney	Head coach: Matt Campbell
AP / Coaches / CFP; 22 / 24 / 19
	1	2	3	4	Total
Clemson	3	3	14	0	20
Iowa State	0	3	3	7	13
- Date: December 29, 2021
- Season: 2021
- Stadium: Camping World Stadium
- Location: Orlando, Florida
- MVP: Mario Goodrich (DB, Clemson)
- Favorite: Clemson by 1
- Referee: Chris Coyte (Pac-12)
- Attendance: 39,051

United States TV coverage
- Network: ESPN; ESPN Radio
- Announcers: ESPN: Dave Pasch (play-by-play), Dusty Dvoracek (analyst), and Tom Luginbill (sideline); ESPN Radio: Marc Kestecher (play-by-play), Ben Hartsock (analyst) & Kris Budden (sideline)

The 2021 Cheez-It Bowl was a college football bowl game played on December 29, 2021, with kickoff at 5:45 p.m. EST and televised on ESPN. It was the 32nd edition of the Cheez-It Bowl, and was one of the 2021–22 bowl games concluding the 2021 FBS football season. Food manufacturing company Kellogg's was the title sponsor of the game, through its Cheez-It brand.

== Teams ==
Consistent with conference tie-ins, the game was played between teams from the Atlantic Coast Conference (ACC) and the Big 12 Conference.

This was the first matchup between Clemson and Iowa State.

=== Clemson Tigers ===
Clemson completed their regular season with a 9–3 overall record, 6–2 in ACC games. The Tigers suffered two losses in their first four games, and did not reach the ACC Championship Game for the first time since the 2014 season. Clemson played three ranked teams during the regular season, losing to Georgia and Pittsburgh while defeating Wake Forest.

=== Iowa State Cyclones ===
Iowa State completed their regular season with an overall 7–5 record, 5–4 in Big 12 games. The Cyclones also lost two of their first four games, and later finished the season by losing three of their final five games. Iowa State faced three ranked FBS teams during the regular season, losing to Iowa and Oklahoma while defeating Oklahoma State.

== Game summary ==
2021 Cheez-It Bowl

Quarter	1	2	3	4	Total
No. 19 Clemson	3	3	14	0	20
Iowa State	0	3	3	7	13

at Camping World Stadium • Orlando, Florida

- Date: Wednesday, December 29, 2021
- Game time: 5:45 p.m. EST
- Game weather: Partly cloudy • Temperature: 78 °F (26 °C) • Wind: SW 5 mph
- Game attendance: 39,051
- Referee: Chris Coyte
- TV announcers (ESPN): Dave Pasch (play-by-play), Dusty Dvoracek (analyst), and Tom Luginbill (sideline)
- Box score

Scoring summary

Quarter	Time	Drive			Team	Scoring information	Score	
Quarter	Time	Plays	Yards	TOP	Team	Scoring information	Clemson	Iowa State
1	6:52	15	69	8:08	Clemson	23-yard field goal by B.T. Potter	3	0
2	11:25	11	78	5:42	Iowa State	22-yard field goal by Andrew Mevis	3	3
2	4:07	8	41	3:26	Clemson	51-yard field goal by B.T. Potter	6	3
3	4:54	16	79	7:39	Clemson	Will Shipley 12-yard touchdown run, B.T. Potter kick good	13	3
3	4:01				Clemson	Interception returned 18 yards for touchdown by Mario Goodrich, B.T. Potter kick good	20	3
3	1:23	4	0	1:04	Iowa State	45-yard field goal by Andrew Mevis	20	6
4	9:42	8	63	5:18	Iowa State	Charlie Kolar 6-yard touchdown reception from Brock Purdy, Andrew Mevis kick good	20	13
"TOP" = time of possession. For other American football terms, see Glossary of American football.							20	13

=== Statistics ===
Statistics	CLEM	ISU
First downs	20	14
Plays–yards	73–315	60–270
Rushes–yards	40–128	21–66
Passing yards	187	204
Passing: comp–att–int	21–33–1	23–39–1
Turnovers		
Time of possession	32:10	27:50

Team	Category	Player	Statistics
Clemson	Passing	DJ Uiagalelei	21/32, 187 yards, 1 INT
Clemson	Rushing	Will Shipley	18 carries, 61 yards, 1 TD
Clemson	Receiving	Dacari Collins	6 receptions, 56 yards
Iowa State	Passing	Brock Purdy	23/39, 204 yards, 1 TD, 1 INT
Iowa State	Rushing	Jirehl Brock	14 rushes, 42 yards
Iowa State	Receiving	Jaylin Noel	4 receptions, 54 yards

== See also ==
- 2022 Citrus Bowl, contested at the same venue three days later
