= 2021 Iowa State Cyclones football team =

American college football season

2021 Iowa State Cyclones football

Cheez-It Bowl, L 13–20 vs. Clemson
- Conference: Big 12 Conference
- Record: 7–6 (5–4 Big 12)
- Head coach: Matt Campbell (6th season)
- Offensive coordinator: Tom Manning (5th season)
- Offensive scheme: Pro spread
- Defensive coordinator: Jon Heacock (6th season)
- Base defense: 3-high safety
- Home stadium: Jack Trice Stadium

2021 Big 12 Conference football standings
	Conf.			Overall
Team	W		L	W		L
No. 7 Oklahoma State y	8	–	1	12	–	2
No. 5 Baylor y$	7	–	2	12	–	2
No. 10 Oklahoma	7	–	2	11	–	2
Iowa State	5	–	4	7	–	6
Kansas State	4	–	5	8	–	5
West Virginia	4	–	5	6	–	7
Texas	3	–	6	5	–	7
TCU	3	–	6	5	–	7
Texas Tech	3	–	6	7	–	6
Kansas	1	–	8	2	–	10
Championship: Baylor 21, Oklahoma State 16
$ – Conference champion; y – Championship game participant; Rankings from AP Poll

The 2021 Iowa State Cyclones football team represented Iowa State University as a member of Big 12 Conference during the 2021 NCAA Division I FBS football season. Led by sixth-year head coach Matt Campbell, the Cyclones compiled an overall record of 7–6 with a mark of 5–4 in conference play, placing fourth in the Big 12. Iowa State was invited to the Cheez-It Bowl, the Cyclones lost to Clemson. The team played home games at Jack Trice Stadium in Ames, Iowa.

Iowa State began the season ranked seventh in the AP poll, the highest preseason ranking in program history.

== Schedule ==
Date	Time	Opponent	Rank	Site	TV	Result	Attendance
September 4	3:30 p.m.	No. 21 (FCS) Northern Iowa*	No. 7	Jack Trice Stadium; Ames, IA	ESPN+	W 16–10	61,500
September 11	3:30 p.m.	No. 10 Iowa*	No. 9	Jack Trice Stadium; Ames, IA (rivalry, College GameDay)	ABC	L 17–27	61,500
September 18	9:30 p.m.	at UNLV*	No. 14	Allegiant Stadium; Paradise, NV	CBSSN	W 48–3	35,193
September 25	2:30 p.m.	at Baylor	No. 14	McLane Stadium; Waco, TX	Fox	L 29–31	42,539
October 2	6:00 p.m.	Kansas		Jack Trice Stadium; Ames, IA	FS1	W 59–7	60,446
October 16	6:30 p.m.	at Kansas State		Bill Snyder Family Football Stadium; Manhattan, KS (rivalry)	ESPN2	W 33–20	48,363
October 23	2:30 p.m.	No. 8 Oklahoma State^{†}		Jack Trice Stadium; Ames, IA	Fox	W 24–21	61,500
October 30	1:00 p.m.	at West Virginia	No. 22	Milan Puskar Stadium; Morgantown, WV	ESPN+	L 31–38	45,613
November 6	6:30 p.m.	Texas		Jack Trice Stadium; Ames, IA	FS1	W 30–7	61,500
November 13	2:30 p.m.	at Texas Tech		Jones AT&T Stadium; Lubbock, TX	ESPN2	L 38–41	47,158
November 20	11:00 a.m.	at No. 13 Oklahoma		Gaylord Family Oklahoma Memorial Stadium; Norman, OK (Big Noon Kickoff)	Fox	L 21–28	82,685
November 26	3:30 p.m.	TCU		Jack Trice Stadium; Ames, IA	FS1	W 48–14	57,775
December 29	4:45 p.m.	vs. No. 19 Clemson*		Camping World Stadium; Orlando, FL (Cheez-It Bowl)	ESPN	L 13–20	39,051
*Non-conference game; ^{†}Homecoming; Rankings from AP Poll (and CFP Rankings, after November 2) - Released prior to game; All times are in Central time

== Rankings ==
Ranking movements Legend: ██ Increase in ranking ██ Decrease in ranking — = Not ranked RV = Received votes
	Week															
Poll	Pre	1	2	3	4	5	6	7	8	9	10	11	12	13	14	Final
AP	7	9	14	14	RV	—	RV	RV	22	RV	RV	RV	—	—	—	—
Coaches	8	10	14	14	RV	RV	RV	RV	23	RV	RV	RV	—	—	—	—
CFP	Not released									—	RV	RV	—	—	—	Not released

== Game summaries ==
=== Vs. No. 21 (FCS) Northern Iowa ===
Northern Iowa Panthers (0–0) vs. #7 Iowa State Cyclones (0–0)

Quarter	1	2	3	4	Total
No. 21 (FCS) Northern Iowa	7	3	0	0	10
No. 7 Iowa State	3	10	0	3	16

at Jack Trice Stadium • Ames, IA

- Date: Saturday, September 4, 2021
- Game time: 3:30 p.m. CDT
- Game weather: sunny • Temperature: 73 °F (23 °C)
- Game attendance: 61,500
- Referee: Kevin Hassell
- TV announcers (ESPN+): Shawn Kenney, Sage Rosenfels, Skubie Mageza

Game information

First Quarter

- (4:09) UNI – Quan Hampton 52-yard pass from Will McElvain, Matthew Cook kick (Drive: 5 plays, 87 yards, 3:24; UNI 7–0)
- (1:06) ISU – Connor Assalley 35-yard field goal (Drive: 6 plays, 57 yards, 3:03; UNI 7–3)

Second Quarter

- (7:25) ISU – Breece Hall 2-yard run, Connor Assalley kick (Drive: 14 plays, 59 yards, 7:19; ISU 10–7)
- (2:35) UNI – Matthew Cook 41-yard field goal (Drive: 10 plays, 51 yards, 4:50; TIED 10–10)
- (0:00) ISU – Andrew Mevis 40-yard field goal (Drive 10 plays, 52 yards, 2:35; ISU 13–10)

Fourth Quarter

- (6:18) ISU – Connor Assalley 21-yard field goal (Drive: 10 plays, 57 yards, 5:20; ISU 16–10)

Statistics	UNI	ISU
First downs	13	17
Total yards	275	336
Rushes/yards	26/45	34/136
Passing yards	230	199
Passing: Comp–Att–Int	21–34–2	21–26–0
Turnovers	2	0
Time of possession	28:48	31:12

Team	Category	Player	Statistics
Northern Iowa	Passing	Will McElvain	21–34, 230 YDS, 1 TD, 2 INT
Northern Iowa	Rushing	Dom Williams	12 CAR, 43 YDS
Northern Iowa	Receiving	Quan Hampton	8 REC, 99 YDS, 1 TD
Iowa State	Passing	Brock Purdy	21–26, 199 yards
Iowa State	Rushing	Breece Hall	23 CAR, 69 YDS, 1 TD
Iowa State	Receiving	Xavier Hutchinson	7 REC, 88 YDS

=== Vs. No. 10 Iowa ===
No. 10 Iowa Hawkeyes (1–0) vs. No. 9 Iowa State Cyclones (1–0)

Quarter	1	2	3	4	Total
No. 10 Iowa	0	14	10	3	27
No. 9 Iowa State	3	7	0	7	17

at Jack Trice Stadium • Ames, IA

- Date: Saturday, September 11, 2021
- Game time: 3:30 p.m. CDT
- Game weather: sunny • Temperature: 92 °F (33 °C) • Wind: S 10 miles per hour (16 km/h)
- Game attendance: 61,500
- Referee: John O'Neill
- TV announcers (ABC): Rece Davis (play-by-play), Kirk Herbstreit (analyst), Holly Rowe (sideline)

Game information

First Quarter

- (00:39) ISU – Connor Assalley 23-yard field goal (Drive: 11 plays, 63 yards, 5:28; ISU 3–0)

Second Quarter

- (08:13) IOWA – Tyler Goodson 4-yard Run (Caleb Shudak Kick) (Drive: 8 plays, 49 yards, 3:50; IOWA 7–3)
- (01:01) IOWA – Charlie Jones 26-yard pass from Spencer Petras (Caleb Shudak Kick) (Drive: 10 plays, 71 yards, 4:34; IOWA 14–3)
- (00:07) ISU – Breece Hall 4-yard Run (Andrew Mevis Kick) (Drive: 5 plays, 75 yards, 0:54; IOWA 14–10)

Third Quarter

- (05:08) IOWA – Jack Campbell 6-yard Fumble Return (Caleb Shudak Kick) (Drive: 1 plays, 0 yards, 0:08; IOWA 21–10)
- (02:56) IOWA – Caleb Shudak 51-yard Field Goal (Drive: 4 plays, -8 yards, 1:27; IOWA 24–10)

Fourth Quarter

- (12:53) IOWA – Caleb Shudak 22-yard Field Goal (Drive: 6 plays, 18 yards, 2:52; IOWA 27–10)
- (03:27) ISU – Tarique Milton 13-yard pass from Hunter Dekkers (Connor Assalley Kick) (Drive: 7 plays, 83 yards, 3:00; IOWA 27–17)

Statistics	IOWA	ISU
First downs	11	21
Total yards	173	339
Rushes/yards	39/67	27/87
Passing yards	106	252
Passing: Comp–Att–Int	11–21–0	24–43–3
Turnovers	0	4
Time of possession	28:22	31:38

Team	Category	Player	Statistics
Iowa	Passing	Spencer Petras	11–21, 106 YDS, 1 TD
Iowa	Rushing	Tyler Goodson	21 CAR, 55 YDS, 1 TD
Iowa	Receiving	Charlie Jones	2 REC, 36 YDS, 1 TD
Iowa State	Passing	Brock Purdy	13–27, 138 YDS, 3 INT
Iowa State	Rushing	Breece Hall	16 CAR, 69 YDS, 1 TD
Iowa State	Receiving	Darren Wilson Jr.	2 REC, 56 YDS

=== At UNLV ===
No. 14 Iowa State Cyclones (1–1) vs. UNLV Rebels (0–2)

Quarter	1	2	3	4	Total
No. 14 Iowa State	7	17	14	10	48
UNLV	0	0	3	0	3

at Allegiant Stadium • Las Vegas, NV

- Date: Saturday, September 18, 2021
- Game time: 9:30 p.m. CDT
- Game weather: Indoors • Temperature: N/A
- Game attendance: 35,193
- Referee: Scott Campbell
- TV announcers (CBSSN): Rich Waltz (pxp), Aaron Taylor (analyst), Jenny Dell (sideline)

Game information

First Quarter

- (08:04) ISU – Breece Hall 1-yard Run (Andrew Mevis Kick) (Drive: 12 plays, 82 yards, 6:56; ISU 7–0)

Second Quarter

- (15:56) ISU – Breece Hall 1-yard Run (Connor Assalley Kick) (Drive: 9 plays, 80 yards, 5:06; ISU 14–0)
- (02:15) ISU – Xavier Hutchinson 20-yard pass from Brock Purdy (Andrew Mevis Kick) (Drive: 4 plays, 29 yards, 1:36; ISU 21–0)
- (00:03) ISU – Andrew Mevis 40-yard Field Goal (Drive: 5 plays, 30 yards, 1:02; ISU 24–0)

Third Quarter

- (11:03) ISU – Charlie Kolar 33-yard pass from Brock Purdy (Connor Assalley Kick) (Drive: 4 plays, 52 yards, 1:50; ISU 31–0)
- (03:39) UNLV – Daniel Gutierrez 30-yard Field Goal (Drive: 14 plays, 66 yards, 7:24; ISU 31–3)
- (01:51) ISU – Xavier Hutchinson 17-yard pass from Brock Purdy (Andrew Mevis Kick) (Drive: 4 plays, 68 yards, 1:48; ISU 38–3)

Fourth Quarter

- (08:23) ISU – Andrew Mevis 54-yard Field Goal (Drive: 7 plays, 10 yards, 3:18; ISU 41–3)
- (05:07) ISU – Deon Silas 1-yard Run (Connor Assalley Kick) (Drive: 4 plays, 52 yards, 1:45; ISU 48–3)

Statistics	ISU	UNLV
First downs	27	7
Total yards	493	134
Rushes/yards	37/184	31/40
Passing yards	309	94
Passing: Comp–Att–Int	23–30–0	10–19–1
Turnovers	1	1
Time of possession	32:14	27:46

Team	Category	Player	Statistics
Iowa State	Passing	Brock Purdy	21–24, 288 YDS, 3 TD
Iowa State	Rushing	Breece Hall	21 CAR, 100 YDS, 2 TD
Iowa State	Receiving	Xavier Hutchinson	10 REC, 133 YDS, 2 TD
UNLV	Passing	Cameron Friel	8–13, 67 YDS, 1 INT
UNLV	Rushing	Charles Williams	19 CAR, 42 YDS
UNLV	Receiving	Giovanni Fauolo Sr.	4 REC, 36 YDS

=== At Baylor ===
No. 14 Iowa State Cyclones (2–1) vs. Baylor Bears (3–0)

Quarter	1	2	3	4	Total
No. 14 Iowa State	7	6	10	6	29
Baylor	7	14	7	3	31

at McLane Stadium • Waco, TX

- Date: Saturday, September 25, 2021
- Game time: 2:30 p.m. CDT
- Game weather: Sunny • Temperature: 90 °F (32 °C)
- Game attendance: 45,140
- Referee: Tuta Salaam
- TV announcers (Fox): Joe Davis (pxp), Brock Huard (analyst)

Game information

First Quarter

- (09:26) ISU – Breece Hall 2-yard Run (Andrew Mevis Kick) (Drive: 10 plays, 75 yards, 5:34; ISU 7–0)
- (05:34) BU – Gerry Bohanon 8-yard Run (Isaiah Hankins Kick) (Drive: 8 plays, 75 yards, 3:52; TIED 7–7)

Second Quarter

- (14:53) BU – Tyquan Thornton 21-yard pass from Gerry Bohanon (Isaiah Hankins Kick) (Drive: 6 plays, 56 yards, 2:22; BU 14–7)
- (10:10) ISU – Andrew Mevis 40-yard Field Goal (Drive: 9 plays, 52 yards, 4:43; BU 14–10)
- (05:37) BU – Ben Sims 33-yard pass from Gerry Bohanon (Isaiah Hankins Kick) (Drive: 9 plays, 75 yards, 4:33; BU 21–10)
- (00:04) ISU – Andrew Mevis 38-yard Field Goal (Drive: 7 plays, 65 yards, 0:55; BU 21–13)

Third Quarter

- (07:13) ISU – Andrew Mevis 38-yard Field Goal (Drive: 9 plays, 55 yards, 4:13; BU 21–16)
- (06:59) BU – Trestan Ebner 98-yard Kickoff Return (Isaiah Hankins Kick) (Drive: 3 plays, 8 yards, 1:41; BU 28–16)
- (00:39) ISU – Breece Hall 2-yard Run (Connor Assalley Kick) (Drive: 5 plays, 85 yards, 2:08; BU 28–23)

Fourth Quarter

- (05:36) BU – Isaiah Hankins 34-yard Field Goal (Drive: 4 plays, -1 yards, 2:04; BU 31–23)
- (00:24) ISU – Breece Hall 16-yard pass from Brock Purdy (Two-Point Pass Conversion Failed) (Drive: 13 plays, 75 yards, 5:12; BU 31–29)

Statistics	ISU	BU
First downs	27	15
Total yards	479	282
Rushes/yards	40/216	33/123
Passing yards	263	159
Passing: Comp–Att–Int	22–33–1	14–19–0
Turnovers	1	1
Time of possession	35:39	24:21

Team	Category	Player	Statistics
Iowa State	Passing	Brock Purdy	22–33, 263 YDS, 1 TD, 1 INT
Iowa State	Rushing	Breece Hall	27 CAR, 190 YDS, 2 TD
Iowa State	Receiving	Chase Allen	7 REC, 98 YDS
Baylor	Passing	Gerry Bohanon	14–19, 159 YDS, 2 TD
Baylor	Rushing	Abram Smith	10 CAR, 47 YDS
Baylor	Receiving	R. J. Sneed	4 REC, 57 YDS

=== Vs. Kansas ===
Kansas Jayhawks (1–3) vs. Iowa State Cyclones (2–2)

Quarter	1	2	3	4	Total
Kansas	0	0	7	0	7
Iowa State	28	10	14	7	59

at Jack Trice Stadium • Ames, IA

- Date: Saturday, October 2, 2021
- Game time: 6:00 p.m. CDT
- Game weather: Overcast • Temperature: 66 °F (19 °C)
- Game attendance: 60,446
- Referee: David Alvarez
- TV announcers (FS1): Eric Collins (pxp), Devin Gardner (analyst)

Game information

First Quarter

- (10:33) ISU – Xavier Hutchinson 36-yard pass from Brock Purdy (Andrew Mevis Kick) (Drive: 6 plays, 70 yards, 3:07; ISU 7–0)
- (08:51) ISU – Charlie Kolar 6-yard pass from Brock Purdy (Connor Assalley Kick) (Drive: 3 plays, 24 yards, 1:08; ISU 14–0)
- (06:10) ISU – Joe Scates 44-yard pass from Brock Purdy (Andrew Mevis Kick) (Drive: 1 plays, 44 yards, 0:07; ISU 21–0)
- (00:48) ISU – Jirehl Brock 7-yard pass from Brock Purdy (Connor Assalley Kick) (Drive: 4 plays, 32 yards, 1:28; ISU 28–0)

Second Quarter

- (03:01) ISU – Breece Hall 9-yard Run (Andrew Mevis Kick) (Drive: 7 plays, 80 yards, 3:53; ISU 0–35)
- (00:00) ISU – Connor Assalley 26-yard Field Goal (Drive: 11 plays, 58 yards, 2:02; ISU 0–38)

Third Quarter

- (09:17) KU – Torry Locklin 12-yard Run (Jacob Borcila Kick) (Drive: 9 plays, 66 yards, 4:03; ISU 7–38)
- (05:27) ISU – Breece Hall 1-yard Run (Connor Assalley Kick) (Drive: 7 plays, 75 yards, 3:45; ISU 7–45)
- (02:27) ISU – Hunter Dekkers 41-yard Run (Andrew Mevis Kick) (Drive: 4 plays, 58 yards, 1:33; ISU 7–52)

Fourth Quarter

- (03:13) ISU – Deon Silas 16-yard Run (Connor Assalley Kick) (Drive: 6 plays, 57 yards, 3:26; ISU 7–59)

Statistics	KU	ISU
First downs	18	25
Total yards	302	564
Rushes/yards	44/175	33/290
Passing yards	127	274
Passing: Comp–Att–Int	11–22–1	19–27–0
Turnovers	2	0
Time of possession	33:15	26:45

Team	Category	Player	Statistics
Kansas	Passing	Jason Bean	10–20, 120 YDS, 1 INT
Kansas	Rushing	Devin Neal	15 CAR, 83 YDS
Kansas	Receiving	Trevor Wilson	3 REC, 55 YDS
Iowa State	Passing	Brock Purdy	17–22, 245 YDS, 4 TD
Iowa State	Rushing	Breece Hall	17 CAR, 123 YDS, 2 TD
Iowa State	Receiving	Xavier Hutchinson	7 REC, 96, 1 TD

=== At Kansas State ===
Iowa State Cyclones (3–2) vs. Kansas State Wildcats (3–2)

Quarter	1	2	3	4	Total
Iowa State	10	10	7	6	33
Kansas State	7	0	0	13	20

at Bill Snyder Family Stadium • Manhattan, KS

- Date: Saturday, October 16, 2021
- Game time: 6:30 p.m. CDT
- Game weather: Overcast• Temperature: 65 °F (18 °C)
- Game attendance: 48,363
- Referee: Scott Campbell
- TV announcers (ESPN2): Clay Matvick (pxp), Rocky Boiman (analyst), Tiffany Blackmon (sideline)

Game information

First Quarter

- (14:48) ISU – Breece Hall 75-yard Run (Andrew Mevis Kick) (Drive: 1 plays, 75 yards, 0:12; ISU 7–0)
- (07:36) ISU – Andrew Mevis 44-yard Field Goal (Drive: 6 plays, 25 yards, 2:27; ISU 10–0)
- (03:58) KSU – Phillip Brooks 40-yard pass from Skylar Thompson (Taiten Winkel Kick) (Drive: 7 plays, 64 yards, 3:38; ISU 10–7)

Second Quarter

- (05:02) ISU – Breece Hall 1-yard Run (Connor Assalley Kick) (Drive: 13 plays, 80 yards, 7:08; ISU 17–7)
- (00:00) ISU – Andrew Mevis 41-yard Field Goal (Drive: 7 plays, 40 yards, 2:27; ISU 20–7)

Third Quarter

- (02:55) ISU – Sean Shaw Jr. 11-yard pass from Brock Purdy (Andrew Mevis Kick) (Drive: 18 plays, 93 yards, 10:02; ISU 27–7)

Fourth Quarter

- (12:21) KSU – Skylar Thompson 1-yard Run (Taiten Winkel PAT failed) (Drive: 11 plays, 75 yards, 5:34; ISU 27–13)
- (09:09) ISU – Andrew Mevis 41-yard Field Goal (Drive: 5 plays, 52 yards, 3:12; ISU 30–13)
- (05:05) KSU – Malik Knowles 9-yard pass from Skylar Thompson (Taiten Winkel Kick) (Drive: 11 plays, 75 yards, 4:04; ISU 30–20)
- (01:23) ISU – Andrew Mevis 40-yard Field Goal (Drive: 8 plays, 22 yards, 3:42; ISU 33–20)

Statistics	ISU	KSU
First downs	19	21
Total yards	418	342
Rushes/yards	35/210	33/136
Passing yards	208	206
Passing: Comp–Att–Int	22–25–0	15–23–1
Turnovers	0	1
Time of possession	33:45	26:15

Team	Category	Player	Statistics
Iowa State	Passing	Brock Purdy	22–25, 208 YDS, 1 TD
Iowa State	Rushing	Breece Hall	30 CAR, 197 YDS, 2 TD
Iowa State	Receiving	Jaylin Noel	5 REC, 48 YDS
Kansas State	Passing	Skylar Thompson	15–23, 206 YDS, 2 TD, 1 INT
Kansas State	Rushing	Deuce Vaughn	18 CAR, 99 YDS
Kansas State	Receiving	Phillip Brooks	3 REC, 54 YDS, 1 TD

=== Vs. No. 8 Oklahoma State ===
No. 8 Oklahoma State Cowboys (6–0) vs. Iowa State Cyclones (4–2)

Quarter	1	2	3	4	Total
Oklahoma State	7	7	0	7	21
Iowa State	0	7	10	7	24

at Jack Trice Stadium • Ames, IA

- Date: Saturday, October 23, 2021
- Game time: 2:30 p.m. CDT
- Game weather: Overcast • Temperature: 52 °F (11 °C)
- Game attendance: 61,500
- Referee: Kevin Mar
- TV announcers (Fox): Aaron Goldsmith (pxp), Brock Huard (analyst)

Game information

First Quarter

- (05:55) OSU – Brennan Presley 5-yard pass from Spencer Sanders (Tanner Brown Kick) (Drive: 6 plays, 48 yards, 3:14; OSU 0–7)

Second Quarter

- (04:19) ISU – Xavier Hutchinson 1-yard pass from Brock Purdy (Andrew Mevis Kick) (Drive: 15 plays, 67 yards, 9:35; TIED 7–7)
- (00:59) OSU – Brennan Presley 42-yard pass from Spencer Sanders (Tanner Brown Kick) (Drive: 4 plays, 72 yards, 0:46; OSU 14–7)

Third Quarter

- (10:21) ISU – Xavier Hutchinson 9-yard pass from Brock Purdy (Connor Assalley Kick)(Drive: 6 plays, 87 yards, 2:41; TIED 14–14)
- (02:41) ISU – Andrew Mevis 29-yard Field Goal(Drive: 9 plays, 68 yards, 4:07; ISU 17–14)

Fourth Quarter

- (08:36) OSU – Tay Martin 25-yard pass from Spencer Sanders (Tanner Brown Kick)(Drive: 5 plays, 58 yards, 2:05; OSU 21–17)
- (05:29) ISU – Breece Hall 4-yard Run (Andrew Mevis Kick)(Drive: 6 plays, 85 yards, 3:07; ISU 24–21)

Statistics	OSU	ISU
First downs	16	18
Total yards	332	374
Rushes/yards	32/107	33/67
Passing yards	127	274
Passing: Comp–Att–Int	15–24–0	27–33–0
Turnovers	0	0
Time of possession	25:49	34:11

Team	Category	Player	Statistics
Oklahoma State	Passing	Spencer Sanders	15–24, 225 YDS, 3 TD
Oklahoma State	Rushing	Jaylen Warren	18 CAR, 76 YDS
Oklahoma State	Receiving	Brennan Presley	6 REC, 84 YDS, 2 TD
Iowa State	Passing	Brock Purdy	27–33, 307 YDS, 2 TD
Iowa State	Rushing	Breece Hall	21 CAR, 70 YDS, 1 TD
Iowa State	Receiving	Xavier Hutchinson	12 REC, 125 YDS, 2 TD

=== At West Virginia ===
No. 22 Iowa State Cyclones (5–2) vs West Virginia Mountaineers (3-4)

Quarter	1	2	3	4	Total
Iowa State	14	3	14	0	31
West Virginia	14	3	7	14	38

at Milan Puskar Stadium • Morgantown, WV

- Date: Saturday, October 30, 2021
- Game time: 1:00 p.m. CDT
- Game weather: Rain• Temperature: 47 °F (8 °C)
- Game attendance: 48,363
- Referee: Derek Anderson
- TV announcers (ESPN+): Courtney Lyle (pxp), Brandon Weeden (analyst), Shane Sparks (sideline)

Game information

First Quarter

- (11:39) ISU – Breece Hall 70-yard Run (Andrew Mevis Kick)(Drive: 3 plays, 83 yards, 1:05; ISU 7–0)
- (07:05) WVU – Leddie Brown 2-yard Run (Casey Legg Kick)(Drive: 12 plays, 75 yards, 4:34; TIED 7–7)
- (04:29) ISU – Tarique Milton 68-yard pass from Brock Purdy (Andrew Mevis Kick)(Drive: 1 plays, 68 yards, 0:11; ISU 14–7)
- (00:18) WVU – Bryce Ford-Wheaton 20-yard pass from Jarret Doege (Casey Legg Kick)(Drive: 9 plays, 75 yards, 4:11; TIED 14–14)

Second Quarter

- (09:29) WVU – Casey Legg 31-yard Field Goal(Drive: 8 plays, 31 yards, 3:59; WVU 17–14)
- (00:18) ISU – Andrew Mevis 34-yard Field Goal(Drive: 7 plays, 41 yards, 1:00; TIED 17–17)

Third Quarter

- (11:07) ISU – Jake Hummel 24-yard Interception Return (Andrew Mevis Kick)(Drive: 1 plays, 24 yards, 0:02; ISU 24–17)
- (08:36) WVU – Bryce Ford-Wheaton 23-yard pass from Jarret Doege (Casey Legg Kick)(Drive: 5 plays, 75 yards, 2:31; TIED 24–24)
- (06:06) ISU – Brock Purdy 1-yard Run (Andrew Mevis Kick)(Drive: 5 plays, 64 yards, 2:22; ISU 31–24)

Fourth Quarter

- (14:49) WVU – Winston Wright Jr. 22-yard pass from Jarret Doege (Casey Legg Kick)(Drive: 12 plays, 75 yards, 6:17; TIED 31–31)
- (09:25) WVU – Leddie Brown 2-yard Run (Casey Legg Kick)(Drive: 6 plays, 85 yards, 2:17; WVU 38–31)

Statistics	ISU	WVU
First downs	16	28
Total yards	424	492
Rushes/yards	34/239	29/122
Passing yards	185	370
Passing: Comp–Att–Int	16–27–0	30–47–2
Turnovers	1	2
Time of possession	25:42	34:18

Team	Category	Player	Statistics
Iowa State	Passing	Brock Purdy	16–27, 185 YDS, 1 TD
Iowa State	Rushing	Breece Hall	24 CAR, 167 YDS, 1 TD
Iowa State	Receiving	Tarique Milton	1 REC, 68 YDS, 1 TD
West Virginia	Passing	Jarret Doege	30-46, 370 YDS, 3 TD, 2 INT
West Virginia	Rushing	Leddie Brown	22 CAR, 109 YDS, 2 TD
West Virginia	Receiving	Bryce Ford-Wheaton	3 REC, 54 YDS, 1 TD

=== Vs. Texas ===
Texas Longhorns (4–4) vs. Iowa State Cyclones (5–3)

Quarter	1	2	3	4	Total
Texas	0	7	0	0	7
Iowa State	3	0	21	6	30

at Jack Trice Stadium • Ames, IA

- Date: Saturday, November 6, 2021
- Game time: 6:30 p.m. CDT
- Game weather: Clear • Temperature: 54 °F (12 °C)
- Game attendance: 61,500
- Referee: Kevin Hassell
- TV announcers (FS1): Aaron Goldsmith (pxp), Mark Helfrich (analyst)

Game information

First Quarter

- (12:27) ISU – Andrew Mevis 24-yard Field Goal(Drive: 7 plays, 32 yards, 2:33; ISU 3–0)

Second Quarter

- (05:29) UT – Xavier Worthy 4-yard pass from Hudson Card (Cameron Dicker Kick)(Drive: 14 plays, 78 yards, 5:38; UT 7–3)

Third Quarter

- (12:45) ISU – Breece Hall 47-yard Run (Andrew Mevis Kick)(Drive: 4 plays, 75 yards, 2:15; ISU 10–7)
- (07:10) ISU – Tarique Milton 49-yard pass from Xavier Hutchinson (Andrew Mevis Kick)(Drive: 1 plays, 49 yards, 0:09; ISU 17–7)
- (04:00) ISU – Breece Hall 2-yard Run (Andrew Mevis Kick)(Drive: 4 plays, 49 yards, 1:41; ISU 24–7)

Fourth Quarter

- (11:47) ISU – Andrew Mevis 29-yard Field Goal(Drive: 11 plays, 86 yards, 5:00; ISU 27–7)
- (04:29) ISU – Andrew Mevis 51-yard Field Goal(Drive: 9 plays, 28 yards, 5:00; ISU 30–7)

Statistics	UT	ISU
First downs	11	23
Total yards	205	476
Rushes/yards	35/102	34/175
Passing yards	103	301
Passing: Comp–Att–Int	16–29–0	28–39–0
Turnovers	2	1
Time of possession	25:02	34:58

Team	Category	Player	Statistics
Texas	Passing	Hudson Card	14-23, 101 YDS, 1 TD
Texas	Rushing	Bijan Robinson	18 CAR, 90 YDS
Texas	Receiving	Bijan Robinson	8 REC, 36 YDS
Iowa State	Passing	Brock Purdy	27-38, 252 YDS
Iowa State	Rushing	Breece Hall	9 CAR, 136 YDS, 2 TD
Iowa State	Receiving	Xavier Hutchinson	8 REC, 96 YDS

=== At Texas Tech ===
Iowa State Cyclones (6–3) vs. Texas Tech Red Raiders (5–4)

Quarter	1	2	3	4	Total
Iowa State	7	7	7	17	38
Texas Tech	14	17	0	10	41

at Jones AT&T Stadium • Lubbock, TX

- Date: Saturday, November 13, 2021
- Game time: 2:30 p.m. CDT
- Game weather: Clear• Temperature: 73 °F (23 °C)
- Game attendance: 47,158
- Referee: Michael Vandervelde
- TV announcers (ESPN2): Beth Mowins (pxp), Kirk Morrison (analyst), Dawn Davenport (sideline)

Game information

First Quarter

- (10:42) TTU – Tahj Brooks 14-yard Run (Jonathan Garibay Kick)(Drive: 7 plays, 75 yards, 4:18; TTU 7–0)
- (06:15) ISU – Breece Hall 1-yard Run (Andrew Mevis Kick)(Drive: 2 plays, 16 yards, 0:34; TIED 7–7)
- (04:26) TTU – Myles Price 39-yard pass from Donovan Smith (Jonathan Garibay Kick)(Drive: 5 plays, 75 yards, 1:49; TTU 14–7)

Second Quarter

- (06:14) TTU – Erik Ezukanma 3-yard pass from Donovan Smith (Jonathan Garibay Kick)(Drive: 15 plays, 70 yards, 8:51; TTU 21–7)
- (03:16) TTU – Erik Ezukanma 18-yard pass from Donovan Smith (Jonathan Garibay Kick)(Drive: 3 plays, 71 yards, 1:20; TTU 28–7)
- (01:11) ISU – Breece Hall 17-yard Run (Andrew Mevis Kick)(Drive: 7 plays, 75 yards, 2:05; TTU 28–14)
- (00:00) TTU – Jonathan Garibay 45-yard Field Goal(Drive: 6 plays, 48 yards, 1:11; TTU 31–14)

Third Quarter

- (03:03) ISU – Charlie Kolar 9-yard pass from Brock Purdy (Andrew Mevis Kick)(Drive: 7 plays, 73 yards, 2:14; TTU 31–21)

Fourth Quarter

- (13:29) ISU – Charlie Kolar 12-yard pass from Brock Purdy (Andrew Mevis Kick)(Drive: 7 plays, 75 yards, 2:50; TTU 31–28)
- (10:51) TTU – SaRodorick Thompson 13-yard Run (Jonathan Garibay Kick)(Drive: 6 plays, 75 yards, 2:38; TTU 38-28)
- (06:20) ISU – Breece Hall 14-yard pass from Brock Purdy (Andrew Mevis Kick)(Drive: 8 plays, 75 yards, 4:31; TTU 38–35)
- (01:00) ISU – Andrew Mevis 29-yard Field Goal(Drive: 15 plays, 68 yards, 3:36; TIED 38–38)
- (00:00) TTU – Jonathan Garibay 62-yard Field Goal(Drive: 7 plays, 31 yards, 1:00; TTU 41–38)

Statistics	ISU	TTU
First downs	26	23
Total yards	445	529
Rushes/yards	25/89	34/207
Passing yards	356	322
Passing: Comp–Att–Int	32-42–2	25-33–1
Turnovers	2	1
Time of possession	27:27	32:33

Team	Category	Player	Statistics
Iowa State	Passing	Brock Purdy	32-42, 356 YDS, 3 TD, 2 INT
Iowa State	Rushing	Breece Hall	18 CAR, 51 YDS, 2 TD
Iowa State	Receiving	Xavier Hutchinson	8 REC, 112 YDS
Texas Tech	Passing	Donovan Smith	25-32, 322 YDS, 3 TD, 1 INT
Texas Tech	Rushing	Tahj Brooks	9 CAR, 80 YDS, 1 TD
Texas Tech	Receiving	Myles Price	9 REC, 175 YDS, 1 TD

=== At No. 13 Oklahoma ===
Iowa State Cyclones (6–4) vs. No. 13 Oklahoma Sooners (9–1)

Quarter	1	2	3	4	Total
Iowa State	7	0	0	14	21
Oklahoma	7	7	7	7	28

at Memorial Stadium • Norman, OK

- Date: Saturday, November 20, 2021
- Game time: 11:00 p.m. CDT
- Game weather: Partly Cloudy• Temperature: 71 °F (22 °C)
- Game attendance: 82,685
- Referee: Brandon Cruse
- TV announcers (Fox): Gus Johnson (pxp), Joel Klatt (analyst), Jenny Taft (sideline)

Game information

First Quarter

- (10:00) ISU – Breece Hall 1-yard Run (Andrew Mevis Kick)(Drive: 12 plays, 75 yards, 5:00; ISU 7–0)
- (09:13) OU – Caleb Williams 74-yard Run (Gabe Brkic Kick)(Drive: 3 plays, 75 yards, 0:47; TIED 7–7)

Second Quarter

- (00:09) OU – Jalen Redmond 42-yard Fumble Return (Gabe Brkic Kick)(Drive: 1 plays, 42 yards, 0:07; OU 14–7)

Third Quarter

- (04:02) OU – Mario Williams 11-yard pass from Caleb Williams (Gabe Brkic Kick)(Drive: 10 plays, 64 yards, 3:06; OU 21–7)

Fourth Quarter

- (10:52) ISU – Chase Allen 12-yard pass from Hunter Dekkers (Andrew Mevis Kick)(Drive: 14 plays, 73 yards, 6:03; OU 21–14)
- (05:06) OU – Eric Gray 7-yard Run (Gabe Brkic Kick)(Drive: 6 plays, 68 yards, 2:20; OU 28-14)
- (02:57) ISU – Charlie Kolar 2-yard pass from Brock Purdy (Andrew Mevis Kick)(Drive: 9 plays, 75 yards, 2:09; OU 28–21)

Statistics	ISU	OU
First downs	25	14
Total yards	361	305
Rushes/yards	35/51	34/209
Passing yards	310	96
Passing: Comp–Att–Int	35-52–2	9-19–1
Turnovers	3	1
Time of possession	38:20	21:40

Team	Category	Player	Statistics
Iowa State	Passing	Brock Purdy	30-43, 281 YDS, 1 TD, 1 INT
Iowa State	Rushing	Breece Hall	19 CAR, 58 YDS, 1 TD
Iowa State	Receiving	Charlie Kolar	12 REC, 152 YDS, 1 TD
Oklahoma	Passing	Caleb Williams	8-18, 87 YDS, 1 TD, 1 INT
Oklahoma	Rushing	Kennedy Brooks	17 CAR, 115 YDS
Oklahoma	Receiving	Marvin Mims	1 REC, 22 YDS

=== Vs. TCU ===
TCU Horned Frogs (5–6) vs. Iowa State Cyclones (6–5)

Quarter	1	2	3	4	Total
TCU	0	7	0	7	14
Iowa State	3	14	10	21	48

at Jack Trice Stadium • Ames, IA

- Date: Friday, November 25, 2021
- Game time: 3:30 p.m. CDT
- Game weather: Clear• Temperature: 30 °F (−1 °C)
- Game attendance: 57,775
- Referee: Scott Campbell
- TV announcers (FS1): Chris Vosters (pxp), Devin Gardner (analyst)

Game information

First Quarter

- (10:33) ISU – Andrew Mevis 27-yard Field Goal(Drive: 9 plays, 50 yards, 4:27; ISU 3–0)

Second Quarter

- (13:12) ISU – Jirehl Brock 40-yard Run (Connor Assalley Kick)(Drive: 5 plays, 80 yards, 1:42; ISU 10–0)
- (03:35) ISU – Breece Hall 39-yard Run (Andrew Mevis Kick)(Drive: 7 plays, 86 yards, 3:08; ISU 17–0)
- (01:33) TCU – Blair Conwright 47-yard pass from Max Duggan (Griffin Kell Kick)(Drive: 6 plays, 75 yards, 2:02; ISU 17–7)

Third Quarter

- (10:25) ISU – Breece Hall 22-yard pass from Brock Purdy (Connor Assalley Kick)(Drive: 3 plays, 38 yards, 1:14; ISU 24–7)
- (02:31) ISU – Andrew Mevis 32-yard Field Goal(Drive: 10 plays, 42 yards, 5:09; ISU 27–7)

Fourth Quarter

- (12:56) ISU – Breece Hall 80-yard Run (Andrew Mevis Kick)(Drive: 1 play, 80 yards, 0:15; ISU 34–7)
- (10:54) TCU – Tyler Guyton 6-yard pass from Max Duggan (Griffin Kell Kick)(Drive: 4 plays, 19 yards, 1:49; ISU 34–14)
- (08:53) ISU – Breece Hall 4-yard Run (Connor Assalley Kick)(Drive: 4 plays, 75 yards, 1:55; ISU 41–14)
- (04:48) ISU – Chase Allen 35-yard pass from Brock Purdy (Andrew Mevis Kick)(Drive: 4 plays, 67 yards, 1:57; ISU 48–14)

Statistics	TCU	ISU
First downs	18	22
Total yards	348	541
Rushes/yards	39/132	23/279
Passing yards	216	262
Passing: Comp–Att–Int	15–26–1	21–30–0
Turnovers	1	0
Time of possession	34:35	25:25

Team	Category	Player	Statistics
TCU	Passing	Max Duggan	15-26, 216 YDS, 2 TD, 1 INT
TCU	Rushing	Emari Demercado	15 CAR, 65 YDS
TCU	Receiving	Derius Davis	4 REC, 63 YDS
Iowa State	Passing	Brock Purdy	21-30, 262 YDS, 2 TD
Iowa State	Rushing	Breece Hall	18 CAR, 242 YDS, 3 TD
Iowa State	Receiving	Xavier Hutchinson	7 REC, 107 YDS

=== Vs. No. 19 Clemson—Cheez-It Bowl ===
No. 19 Clemson Tigers (9–3) vs. Iowa State Cyclones (7–5) (Cheez-It Bowl)

Quarter	1	2	3	4	Total
Clemson	3	3	14	0	20
Iowa State	0	3	3	7	13

at Camping World Stadium • Orlando, FL

- Date: Wednesday, Dec 29, 2021
- Game time: 4:45 p.m. CDT
- Game weather: Clear • Temperature: 72 °F (22 °C)
- Game attendance: 39,051
- Referee: Chris Coyte
- TV announcers (ESPN): Dave Pasch (pxp), Dusty Dvoracek (analyst), Tom Luginbill (sideline)

Game information

First Quarter

- (06:52) CLEM – B.T. Potter 23-yard Field Goal(Drive: 15 plays, 69 yards, 8:08; CLEM 3–0)

Second Quarter

- (11:25) ISU – Andrew Mevis 22-yard Field Goal(Drive: 11 plays, 78 yards, 5:42; TIE 3–3)
- (04:07) CLEM – B.T. Potter 51-yard Field Goal(Drive: 8 plays, 41 yards, 3:26; CLEM 6–3)

Third Quarter

- (04:53) CLEM – Will Shipley 12-yard Run (B.T. Potter Kick)(Drive: 16 plays, 79 yards, 7:39; CLEM 13–3)
- (04:01) CLEM – Mario Goodrich 18-yard Interception Return (B.T. Potter Kick)(Drive: 2 plays, 5 yards, 0:53; CLEM 20–3)
- (01:23) ISU – Andrew Mevis 45-yard Field Goal(Drive: 4 plays, 0 yards, 1:04; CLEM 20–6)

Fourth Quarter

- (09:42) ISU – Charlie Kolar 6-yard pass from Brock Purdy (Andrew Mevis Kick)(Drive: 8 play, 63 yards, 5:18; CLEM 20–13)

Statistics	CLEM	ISU
First downs	20	14
Total yards	315	270
Rushes/yards	40/128	21/66
Passing yards	187	204
Passing: Comp–Att–Int	21–33–1	23–39–1
Turnovers	1	1
Time of possession	32:10	27:50

Team	Category	Player	Statistics
CLEMSON	Passing	DJ Uiagalelei	21-32, 187 YDS, 1 INT
CLEMSON	Rushing	Will Shipley	18 CAR, 61 YDS, 1 TD
CLEMSON	Receiving	Dacari Collins	6 REC, 56 YDS
Iowa State	Passing	Brock Purdy	23-39, 204 YDS, 1 TD, 1 INT
Iowa State	Rushing	Jirehl Brock	14 CAR, 42 YDS
Iowa State	Receiving	Jaylin Noel	4 REC, 54 YDS

== Coaching staff ==
Name	Position	Year at Iowa State	Previous job
Matt Campbell	Head coach	6th	Toledo (HC)
Jon Heacock	Defensive coordinator	6th	Toledo (DC)
Tom Manning	Offensive coordinator	5th	Indianapolis Colts (TE)
Tyson Veidt	Assistant head coach/linebackers	6th	Toledo (LB)
Eli Rasheed	Defensive line	6th	Toledo (DL)
Joel Gordon	Passing game coordinator/QB	6th	Ferrum (OC)
Jeff Myers	Offensive line	6th	Toledo (graduate assistant)
Nathan Scheelhaase	Run game coordinator/running backs/wide receivers	4th	Illinois (offensive analyst)
Matt Caponi	Cornerbacks	3rd	West Virginia (DB)
Taylor Mouser	Tight ends	6th	Toledo (GA)
Deon Broomfield	Safeties	1st	Houston Texans (DA)
Jake Waters	Offensive quality control	2nd	UTEP (WR)

== TV ratings ==
Opponent	Outlet	Viewers	Rating
Northern Iowa	ESPN+	†	†
Iowa	ABC	3.890	2.2
@ UNLV	CBSSN	†	†
@ Baylor	FOX	2.012M	1.1
Kansas	FS1	262K	0.17
@ Kansas State	ESPN2	608K	0.31
Oklahoma State	FOX	2.659M	1.6
@ West Virginia	ESPN+	†	†
Texas	FS1	907K	0.47
@ Texas Tech	ESPN2	676K	0.37
@ Oklahoma	FOX	3.103M	1.9
TCU	FS1	518K	0.26
vs. Clemson	ESPN	4.902M	2.8

All totals via Sports Media Watch. Streaming numbers not included. † - Data not available.
