= Frank Ladson Jr. =

American football player (born 2000)

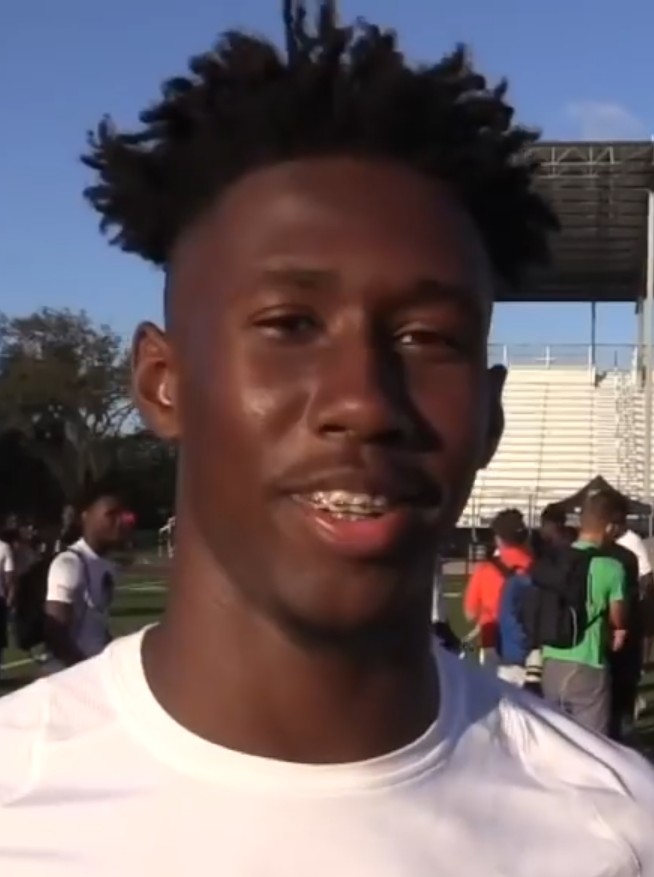
- Ladson in 2018

No. 7 – UMass Minutemen
- Position: Wide receiver
- Class: Graduate student

Personal information
- Born: September 27, 2000 (age 26); Miami, Florida
- Listed height: 6 ft 3 in (1.91 m)
- Listed weight: 205 lb (93 kg)

Career information
- High school: South Dade (Miami-Dade County)
- College: Clemson (2019–2021); Miami (FL) (2022–2023); UMass (2024–present)
- Stats at ESPN

Frank Ladson Jr. (born September 27, 2000) is an American college football wide receiver for the UMass Minutemen. He previously played for the Clemson Tigers and the Miami Hurricanes.

== Early life ==
Ladson attended South Dade Senior High School in Miami-Dade County, Florida. As a senior, Ladson caught 50 passes for a school record 1,133 yards and 13 touchdowns. Ladson was invited to the All-American Bowl as a result. A five-star recruit, Ladson committed to play college football at Clemson University.

== College career ==
=== Clemson ===
As a freshman, Ladson recorded nine catches for 128 yards and three touchdowns. Ladson's first career catch was a 21-yard touchdown pass. The following season, Ladson tallied 18 catches for 281 yards and three touchdowns. In 2021, Ladson had four catches for 19 yards before his season was cut short due to injuries.

=== Miami ===
In January 2022, Ladson announced he would be transferring to the University of Miami to play for the Miami Hurricanes. In his first season with Miami, he caught 27 receptions for 298 yards and a touchdown before recording no offensive stats the following season. Subsequently, he entered the transfer portal for a second time.

=== UMass ===
On December 27, 2023, Ladson announced he would be transferring to the University of Massachusetts Amherst to play for the UMass Minutemen.
