= 2018 Cotton Bowl Classic =

College Football Playoff Semifinal bowl game

2018 Goodyear Cotton Bowl Classic
- College Football Playoff Semifinal; 83rd Cotton Bowl Classic
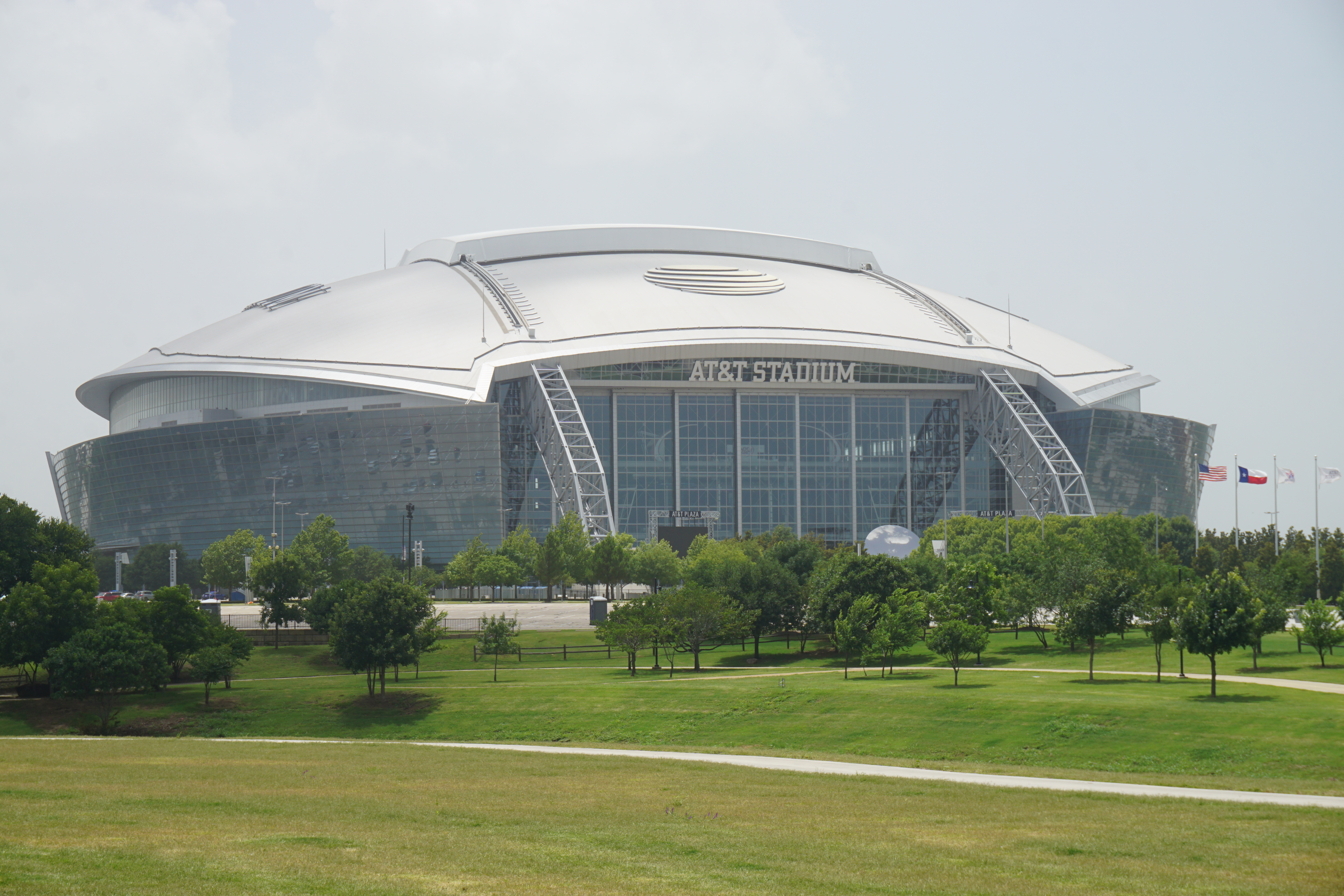
- AT&T Stadium in Arlington, Texas, hosted the Cotton Bowl Classic.
Notre Dame Fighting Irish	Clemson Tigers
(12–0)	(13–0)
Independent	ACC
3	30
Head coach: Brian Kelly	Head coach: Dabo Swinney
AP / Coaches / CFP; 3 / 3 / 3	AP / Coaches / CFP; 2 / 2 / 2
	1	2	3	4	Total
Notre Dame	3	0	0	0	3
Clemson	3	20	7	0	30
- Date: December 29, 2018
- Season: 2018
- Stadium: AT&T Stadium
- Location: Arlington, Texas
- MVP: Trevor Lawrence (QB, Clemson); Austin Bryant (DE, Clemson)
- Favorite: Clemson by 10.5
- Referee: Matt Austin (SEC)
- Attendance: 72,183

United States TV coverage
- Network: ESPN and ESPN Radio
- Announcers: Sean McDonough (play-by-play) Todd Blackledge (analyst); Holly Rowe and Tom Rinaldi (sideline) (ESPN); Bill Rosinski, David Norrie and Ian Fitzsimmons (ESPN Radio)
- Nielsen ratings: 10.3 (16.8 million viewers)

International TV coverage
- Network: ESPN Deportes; ESPN Deportes Radio
- Announcers: Lalo Varela and Pablo Viruega

The 2018 Cotton Bowl Classic was a college football bowl game played on December 29, 2018, at AT&T Stadium in Arlington, Texas. The 83rd Cotton Bowl Classic was a College Football Playoff semifinal, the game featured two of the four teams selected by the College Football Playoff Selection Committee—Notre Dame from the NCAA FBS independents and Clemson from the ACC. The game started slow on offense with only 2 field goals in the first quarter, the 3 points for Notre Dame were the only points they scored, as Clemson dominated all the way 30-3. They advanced to face the winner of the Orange Bowl (Alabama) to compete in the 2019 College Football Playoff National Championship. It was one of the 2018–19 bowl games concluding the 2018 FBS football season. Sponsored by the Goodyear Tire and Rubber Company, the game was officially known as the College Football Playoff Semifinal at the Goodyear Cotton Bowl Classic.

== Teams ==
The game featured second-ranked Clemson of the Atlantic Coast Conference (ACC) against third-ranked Notre Dame, an FBS independent. This was the first time that the two programs met in a bowl game; their more recent regular season meeting had been in 2015, won by Clemson. The only prior Cotton Bowl to feature two undefeated teams had been the 1948 edition, which ended in a 13–13 tie between Penn State and SMU.

=== Clemson Tigers ===
Clemson defeated Pitt in the 2018 ACC Championship Game on December 1, then received their bid to the Cotton Bowl with the release of final CFP rankings on December 2. The Tigers entered the bowl with a 13–0 record (8–0 in conference). On December 27, it was confirmed that three Clemson players, including starting defensive lineman Dexter Lawrence, would be suspended from playing in the game by the NCAA, due to drug testing showing "trace amounts of a banned substance", which was identified as ostarine.

This was Clemson's second Cotton Bowl bid in school history, following its appearance in the 1940 edition. It was also the first Cotton Bowl appearance by an active ACC member since Maryland's appearance in the 1977 edition.

=== Notre Dame Fighting Irish ===
Notre Dame received their bid to the Cotton Bowl with the release of final CFP rankings on December 2. The independent Fighting Irish entered the bowl with a 12–0 record. This was Notre Dame's first Cotton Bowl berth since the 1994 edition and its eighth overall.

== Game summary ==
=== Scoring summary ===
Scoring summary

Quarter	Time	Drive			Team	Scoring information	Score	
Quarter	Time	Plays	Yards	TOP	Team	Scoring information	ND	CLEM
1	8:35	9	31	3:15	CLEM	40-yard field goal by Greg Huegel	0	3
1	4:31	10	66	4:04	ND	28-yard field goal by Justin Yoon	3	3
2	12:50	3	65	1:04	CLEM	Justyn Ross 52-yard touchdown reception from Trevor Lawrence, Greg Huegel kick blocked	3	9
2	1:44	8	85	3:12	CLEM	Justyn Ross 42-yard touchdown reception from Trevor Lawrence, Greg Huegel kick good	3	16
2	0:02	4	80	0:46	CLEM	Tee Higgins 19-yard touchdown reception from Trevor Lawrence, Greg Huegel kick good	3	23
3	2:04	3	71	1:01	CLEM	Travis Etienne 62-yard touchdown run, Greg Huegel kick good	3	30
"TOP" = time of possession. For other American football terms, see Glossary of American football.							3	30

=== Statistics ===
	1	2	3	4	Total
No. 3 Fighting Irish	3	0	0	0	3
No. 2 Tigers	3	20	7	0	30

Statistics	ND	CLEM
First downs	17	26
Plays–yards	69–248	78–538
Rushes–yards	35–88	37–211
Passing yards	160	327
Passing: comp–att–int	17–34–1	27–41–0
Turnovers		
Time of possession	27:06	32:54

Team	Category	Player	Statistics
Notre Dame	Passing	Ian Book	17/34, 160 yds, 1 INT
Notre Dame	Rushing	Dexter Williams	16 car, 54 yds
Notre Dame	Receiving	Miles Boykin	5 rec, 69 yds
Clemson	Passing	Trevor Lawrence	27/39, 327 yds, 3 TD
Clemson	Rushing	Travis Etienne	14 car, 109 yds, 1 TD
Clemson	Receiving	Justyn Ross	6 rec, 148 yds, 2 TD
