= 2018 Clemson Tigers football team =

American college football season

2018 Clemson Tigers football

Consensus national champion ACC champion ACC Atlantic Division champion Cotton Bowl Classic champion

ACC Championship Game, W 42–10 vs. Pittsburgh

Cotton Bowl Classic (CFP Semifinal), W 30–3 vs. Notre Dame CFP National Championship, W 44–16 vs. Alabama
- Conference: Atlantic Coast Conference
- Atlantic Division

Ranking
- Coaches: No. 1
- AP: No. 1
- Record: 15–0 (8–0 ACC)
- Head coach: Dabo Swinney (10th full, 11th overall season)
- Co-offensive coordinators: Tony Elliott (4th season); Jeff Scott (4th season)
- Offensive scheme: Spread
- Defensive coordinator: Brent Venables (7th season)
- Base defense: 4–3
- Home stadium: Memorial Stadium

2018 Atlantic Coast Conference football standings
	Conf.			Overall
Team	W		L	W		L
Atlantic Division
No. 1 Clemson x$#^	8	–	0	15	–	0
No. 15 Syracuse	6	–	2	10	–	3
NC State	5	–	3	9	–	4
Boston College	4	–	4	7	–	5
Wake Forest	3	–	5	7	–	6
Florida State	3	–	5	5	–	7
Louisville	0	–	8	2	–	10
Coastal Division
Pittsburgh x	6	–	2	7	–	7
Georgia Tech	5	–	3	7	–	6
Miami (FL)	4	–	4	7	–	6
Virginia	4	–	4	8	–	5
Virginia Tech	4	–	4	6	–	7
Duke	3	–	5	8	–	5
North Carolina	1	–	7	2	–	9
Championship: Clemson 42, Pittsburgh 10
# – College Football Playoff champion; ^ – College Football Playoff participant; $ – Conference champion; x – Division champion/co-champions; Rankings from AP Poll

The 2018 Clemson Tigers football team represented Clemson University during the 2018 NCAA Division I FBS football season. The Tigers played their home games at Memorial Stadium, also known as "Death Valley," and competed in the Atlantic Division of the Atlantic Coast Conference. They were led by head coach Dabo Swinney in his tenth full year and 11th overall since taking over midway through 2008 season.

Clemson, coming off a College Football Playoff semifinal loss to Alabama in 2017, began the year ranked second in the preseason AP Poll and Coaches Poll. The Tigers won all 12 of their regular season games, securing their first undefeated regular season since 2015. Clemson won their fourth consecutive ACC title by defeating Pittsburgh in the 2018 ACC Championship Game. In the final College Football Playoff rankings of the 2018 season, Clemson was ranked second, earning them their fourth consecutive playoff bid and a spot in the 2018 Cotton Bowl Classic against third-ranked Notre Dame. The Tigers won that game 30–3, advancing them to the 2019 College Football Playoff National Championship against Alabama, their fourth consecutive year meeting the Crimson Tide in the playoff and third time in four years doing so in the national title game. Clemson won that game in dominant fashion, 44–16, to win the Tigers' third national championship in school history and second in three years. They were the first undefeated College Football Playoff champion and the first major college football program to finish with a record of 15–0 since Penn in 1897. The team is considered by some analysts to be one of the greatest in college football history.

The Tigers were led offensively by true freshman quarterback Trevor Lawrence, who won a highly publicized battle for the starting role over 2017 starter Kelly Bryant. Sophomore running back Travis Etienne contributed significantly, rushing for over 1,600 yards and an FBS-leading 24 rushing touchdowns. He was named ACC Player of the Year following the regular season. On defense, the team was anchored by a veteran defensive line consisting of Clelin Ferrell, Christian Wilkins, Dexter Lawrence, and Austin Bryant, all of whom were subsequently drafted in the 2019 NFL draft.

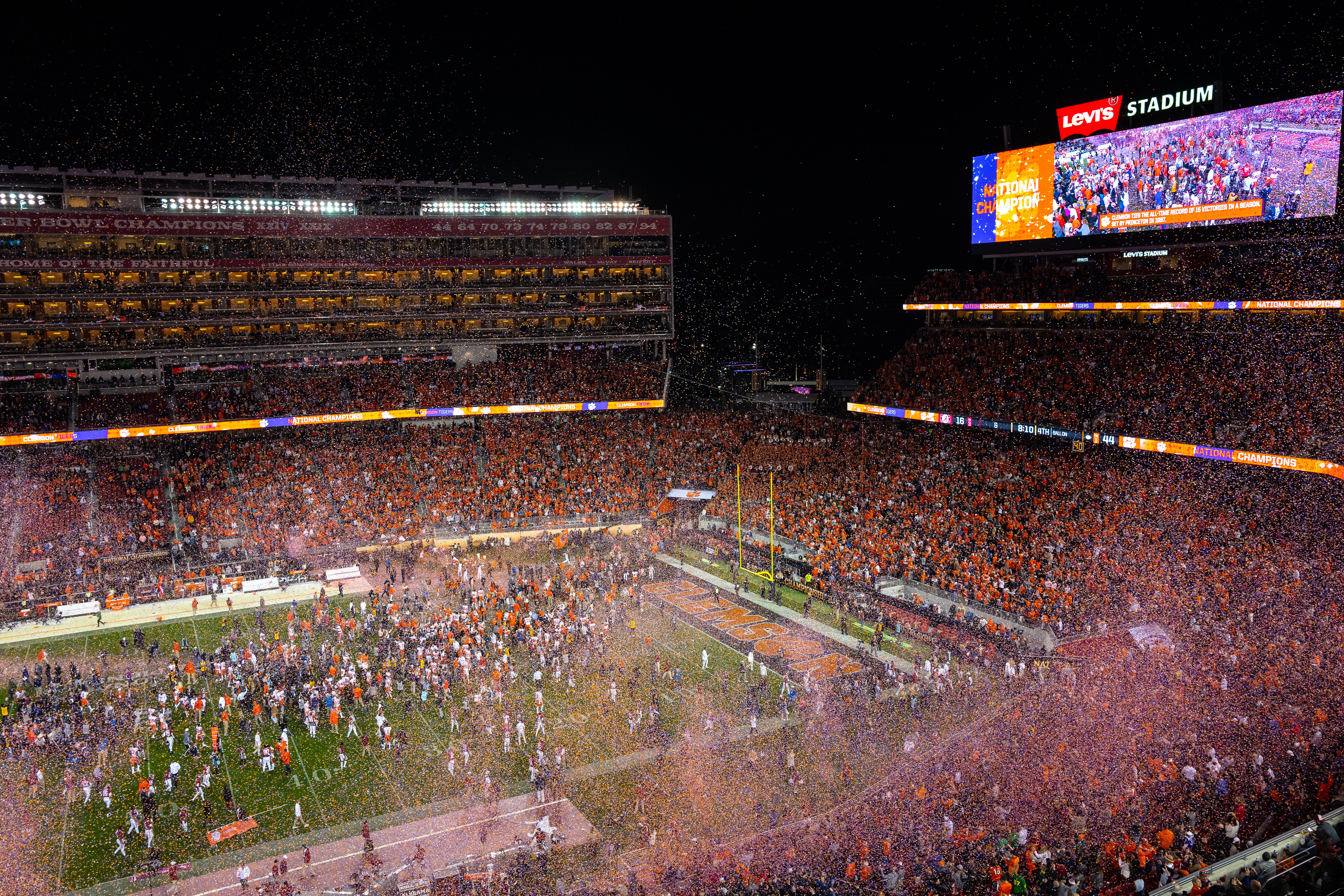
The 2018 Clemson football team was declared national champion at Levi's Stadium in Santa Clara, Calif. after defeating Alabama Crimson Tide.

== Offseason ==
Position key

Back	B	Center	C	Cornerback	CB	Defensive back	DB
Defensive end	DE	Defensive lineman	DL	Defensive tackle	DT	End	E
Fullback	FB	Guard	G	Halfback	HB	Kicker	K
Kickoff returner	KR	Offensive tackle	OT	Offensive lineman	OL	Linebacker	LB
Long snapper	LS	Punter	P	Punt returner	PR	Quarterback	QB
Running back	RB	Safety	S	Tight end	TE	Wide receiver	WR

=== Offseason departures ===
==== NFL draftees ====
Player	Round	Pick	Team	Position
Dorian O'Daniel	3	100	Kansas City Chiefs	LB
Deon Cain	6	185	Indianapolis Colts	WR
Ray-Ray McCloud	6	187	Buffalo Bills	WR
Ryan Carter	Undrafted		Buffalo Bills	CB
Marcus Edmund	Undrafted		Los Angeles Chargers	CB
Van Smith	Undrafted		Atlanta Falcons	S
Taylor Hearn	Undrafted		Carolina Panthers	OL

==== Transfers ====
Name	Number	Pos.	Height	Weight	Year	Hometown	College transferred to	Source(s)
Jabril Robinson	50	DT	6'2"	270	(redshirt) Senior	Leland, NC	West Virginia	
Tucker Israel	10	QB	5'11"	165	(redshirt) Junior	Orlando, FL	None	
Zerrick Cooper	6	QB	6'2"	220	(redshirt) Sophomore	Jonesboro, GA	Jacksonville State	
Amir Trapp	38	CB	5'8"	170	(redshirt) Sophomore	Clemson, SC	Furman	
Sterling Johnson	93	DT	6'4"	300	(redshirt) Sophomore	Clayton, NC	Coastal Carolina	
C.J. Fuller	27	RB	5'10"	205	(redshirt) Senior	Easley, SC	None^	
Shadell Bell	11	TE	6'1"	225	(redshirt) Sophomore	Decatur, GA	Coastal Carolina	
Josh Belk	94	DT	6'3"	309	Freshman	Richburg, SC	South Carolina	
Hunter Johnson	15	QB	6'2"	220	Sophomore	Brownsburg, IN	Northwestern	
Kelly Bryant*	2	QB	6'3	225	Senior	Calhoun Falls, SC	Missouri	

^ Prior to the season, C.J. Fuller decided to transfer from the program. However, on October 3, 2018, before he elected a school to transfer to, Fuller died due to a blood clot in his lung. Fuller, age 22, had had surgery two weeks before his death.

* Kelly Bryant decided to transfer schools after playing in four games during the 2018 season.

=== Recruits ===
The Tigers signed a total of 17 recruits, 15 on early signing day and 2 on National Signing Day. The 2018 class was ranked as the best in the ACC and the seventh best nationally by the 247Sports.com Composite Rankings.

College recruiting (2018)
Name	Hometown	School	Height	Weight	Commit date
Mike Jones Jr. LB	Lebanon, Tennessee	IMG Academy	6 ft 0 in (1.83 m)	228 lb (103 kg)	Jun 16, 2016
Mike Jones Jr. LB	Recruit ratings: Scout: Rivals: 247Sports: ESPN:				
Trevor Lawrence; QB	Cartersville, Georgia	Cartersville High School	6 ft 6 in (1.98 m)	208 lb (94 kg)	Dec 16, 2016
Trevor Lawrence; QB	Recruit ratings: Scout: Rivals: 247Sports: ESPN:				
Jake Venables; LB	Central, South Carolina	Daniel High School	6 ft 2 in (1.88 m)	229 lb (104 kg)	Dec 18, 2016
Jake Venables; LB	Recruit ratings: Scout: Rivals: 247Sports: ESPN:				
Derion Kendrick; WR	Rock Hill, South Carolina	South Pointe High School	6 ft 1 in (1.85 m)	184 lb (83 kg)	Jan 28, 2017
Derion Kendrick; WR	Recruit ratings: Scout: Rivals: 247Sports: ESPN:				
Josh Belk; DT	Richburg, South Carolina	Lewisville High School	6 ft 3 in (1.91 m)	309 lb (140 kg)	Jan 29, 2017
Josh Belk; DT	Recruit ratings: Scout: Rivals: 247Sports: ESPN:				
Justin Mascoll; DE	Snellville, Georgia	South Gwinnett High School	6 ft 4 in (1.93 m)	237 lb (108 kg)	Mar 17, 2017
Justin Mascoll; DE	Recruit ratings: Scout: Rivals: 247Sports: ESPN:				
Braden Galloway; TE	Seneca, South Carolina	Seneca High School	6 ft 6 in (1.98 m)	225 lb (102 kg)	Apr 8, 2017
Braden Galloway; TE	Recruit ratings: Scout: Rivals: 247Sports: ESPN:				
Xavier Thomas; DE	Florence, South Carolina	IMG Academy	6 ft 3 in (1.91 m)	260 lb (120 kg)	Apr 8, 2017
Xavier Thomas; DE	Recruit ratings: Scout: Rivals: 247Sports: ESPN:				
B. T. Potter; K	Rock Hill, South Carolina	South Pointe High School	5 ft 11 in (1.80 m)	165 lb (75 kg)	Jun 7, 2017
B. T. Potter; K	Recruit ratings: Scout: Rivals: 247Sports: ESPN:				
Darnell Jefferies; DT	Covington, Georgia	Newton High School	6 ft 3 in (1.91 m)	275 lb (125 kg)	Jun 12, 2017
Darnell Jefferies; DT	Recruit ratings: Scout: Rivals: 247Sports: ESPN:				
Kyler McMichael; CB	Suwanee, Georgia	Greater Atlanta Christian School	6 ft 1 in (1.85 m)	201 lb (91 kg)	Jun 23, 2017
Kyler McMichael; CB	Recruit ratings: Scout: Rivals: 247Sports: ESPN:				
Jordan McFadden; OT	Roebuck, South Carolina	Dorman High School	6 ft 4 in (1.93 m)	290 lb (130 kg)	Dec 9, 2017
Jordan McFadden; OT	Recruit ratings: Scout: Rivals: 247Sports: ESPN:				
KJ Henry; DE	Winston-Salem, North Carolina	West Forsyth High School	6 ft 5 in (1.96 m)	220 lb (100 kg)	Dec 20, 2017
KJ Henry; DE	Recruit ratings: Scout: Rivals: 247Sports: ESPN:				
Jackson Carman; OT	Fairfield, Ohio	Fairfield High School	6 ft 6 in (1.98 m)	330 lb (150 kg)	Dec 20, 2017
Jackson Carman; OT	Recruit ratings: Scout: Rivals: 247Sports: ESPN:				
Lyn-J Dixon; RB	Butler, Georgia	Taylor County High School	5 ft 11 in (1.80 m)	178 lb (81 kg)	Dec 20, 2017
Lyn-J Dixon; RB	Recruit ratings: Scout: Rivals: 247Sports: ESPN:				
Mario Goodrich; CB	Lee's Summit, Missouri	Lee's Summit West High School	6 ft 2 in (1.88 m)	180 lb (82 kg)	Feb 7, 2018
Mario Goodrich; CB	Recruit ratings: Scout: Rivals: 247Sports: ESPN:				
Justyn Ross; WR	Phenix City, Alabama	Central High School	6 ft 4 in (1.93 m)	201 lb (91 kg)	Feb 7, 2018
Justyn Ross; WR	Recruit ratings: Scout: Rivals: 247Sports: ESPN:				
Overall recruit ranking: Rivals: 8 247Sports: 7 ESPN: 5
Note: In many cases, Scout, Rivals, 247Sports, On3, and ESPN may conflict in their listings of height and weight.; In these cases, the average was taken. ESPN grades are on a 100-point scale.; Sources: "Clemson Football Commitments". Rivals.; "2018 Team Ranking". Rivals.com.

=== Returning starters ===
Name	Number	Pos.	Hometown	Source
Mitch Hyatt	75	OL	Suwanee, GA	
Clelin Ferrell	99	DE	Richmond, VA	
Austin Bryant	7	DE	Pavo, GA	
Kendall Joseph	34	LB	Belton, SC	
Christian Wilkins	42	DT	Springfield, MA	
Kelly Bryant	2	QB	Calhoun Falls, SC	
Travis Etienne	9	RB	Jennings, LA	
Hunter Renfrow	13	WR	Myrtle Beach, SC	
Justin Falcinelli	50	C	Middletown, MD	
Tremayne Anchrum	73	OL	Powder Springs, GA	
Dexter Lawrence	90	DT	Wake Forest, NC	
Tre Lamar	57	LB	Roswell, GA	

== Preseason ==
=== Award watch lists ===
Listed in the order that they were released

Award	Player	Position	Year
Lott Trophy	Dexter Lawrence	DT	JR
Lott Trophy	Christian Wilkins	DT	SR
Rimington Trophy	Justin Falcinelli	C	SR
Chuck Bednarik Award	Clelin Ferrell	DE	JR
Chuck Bednarik Award	Dexter Lawrence	DT	JR
Chuck Bednarik Award	Christian Wilkins	DT	SR
Maxwell Award	Christian Wilkins	DT	SR
Maxwell Award	Travis Etienne	RB	SO
Maxwell Award	Kelly Bryant	QB	SR
Davey O'Brien Award	Kelly Bryant	QB	SR
Doak Walker Award	Travis Etienne	RB	SO
John Mackey Award	Milan Richard	TE	SR
Butkus Award	Kendall Joseph	LB	SR
Butkus Award	Tre Lamar	LB	JR
Bronko Nagurski Trophy	Austin Bryant	DE	SR
Bronko Nagurski Trophy	Clelin Ferrell	DE	JR
Bronko Nagurski Trophy	Dexter Lawrence	DT	JR
Bronko Nagurski Trophy	Christian Wilkins	DT	SR
Outland Trophy	Justin Falcinelli	C	SR
Outland Trophy	Mitch Hyatt	OT	SR
Outland Trophy	Dexter Lawrence	DT	JR
Outland Trophy	Christian Wilkins	DT	SR
Lou Groza Award	Greg Huegel	K	SR
Wuerffel Trophy	Christian Wilkins	DT	SR
Walter Camp Award	Dexter Lawrence	DT	JR
Walter Camp Award	Christian Wilkins	DT	SR
Ted Hendricks Award	Austin Bryant	DE	SR
Ted Hendricks Award	Clelin Ferrell	DE	JR
Johnny Unitas Golden Arm Award	Kelly Bryant	QB	SR

=== ACC media poll ===
The ACC media poll was released on July 24, 2018. Clemson was the consensus pick to repeat as ACC Champion, receiving 145 votes out of 148 to win the Atlantic Division and 139 of 148 votes to win the Conference Championship.

Media poll (Atlantic)
Predicted finish	Team	Votes (1st place)
1	Clemson	1,031 (145)
2	Florida State	789 (1)
3	NC State	712 (2)
4	Boston College	545
5	Louisville	422
6	Wake Forest	413
7	Syracuse	232

Media poll (ACC Championship)
Rank	Team	Votes
1	Clemson	139
2	Miami (FL)	5
3	NC State	2
4	Florida State	1
4	Virginia Tech	1

== Schedule ==
Clemson announced its 2018 football schedule on January 17, 2018. The 2018 schedule consisted of seven home games and five away games in the regular season. The Tigers hosted ACC foes Syracuse, NC State, Louisville, and Duke and traveled to Georgia Tech, Wake Forest, Florida State and Boston College.

The Tigers hosted three of the four non-conference opponents, Furman from the Southern Conference, Georgia Southern from Sun Belt Conference and South Carolina from the SEC, and traveled to Texas A&M from the SEC.

Date	Time	Opponent	Rank	Site	TV	Result	Attendance
September 1	12:20 p.m.	No. 23 (FCS) Furman*	No. 2	Memorial Stadium; Clemson, SC	ACCN	W 48–7	80,048
September 8	7:00 p.m.	at Texas A&M*	No. 2	Kyle Field; College Station, TX (College GameDay)	ESPN	W 28–26	104,794
September 15	12:00 p.m.	Georgia Southern*	No. 2	Memorial Stadium; Clemson, SC	ESPNU	W 38–7	79,844
September 22	3:30 p.m.	at Georgia Tech	No. 3	Bobby Dodd Stadium; Atlanta, GA (rivalry)	ABC	W 49–21	50,595
September 29	12:00 p.m.	Syracuse	No. 3	Memorial Stadium; Clemson, SC	ABC	W 27–23	80,122
October 6	3:30 p.m.	at Wake Forest	No. 4	BB&T Field; Winston-Salem, NC	ESPN	W 63–3	31,608
October 20	3:30 p.m.	No. 16 NC State^{†}	No. 3	Memorial Stadium; Clemson, SC (Textile Bowl)	ESPN	W 41–7	81,295
October 27	12:00 p.m.	at Florida State	No. 2	Doak Campbell Stadium; Tallahassee, FL (rivalry)	ABC	W 59–10	68,403
November 3	12:00 p.m.	Louisville	No. 2	Memorial Stadium; Clemson, SC	ABC	W 77–16	78,741
November 10	8:00 p.m.	at No. 17 Boston College	No. 2	Alumni Stadium; Chestnut Hill, MA (O'Rourke–McFadden Trophy, College GameDay)	ABC	W 27–7	44,500
November 17	7:00 p.m.	Duke	No. 2	Memorial Stadium; Clemson, SC	ESPN	W 35–6	81,313
November 24	7:00 p.m.	South Carolina*	No. 2	Memorial Stadium; Clemson, SC (rivalry)	ESPN	W 56–35	81,436
December 1	8:00 p.m.	vs. Pittsburgh	No. 2	Bank of America Stadium; Charlotte, NC (ACC Championship Game)	ABC	W 42–10	67,784
December 29	4:00 p.m.	vs. No. 3 Notre Dame*	No. 2	AT&T Stadium; Arlington, TX (Cotton Bowl Classic–CFP Semifinal)	ESPN	W 30–3	72,183
January 7, 2019	8:00 p.m.	vs. No. 1 Alabama*	No. 2	Levi's Stadium; Santa Clara, CA (CFP National Championship, rivalry, College GameDay)	ESPN	W 44–16	74,814
*Non-conference game; ^{†}Homecoming; Rankings from AP Poll and CFP Rankings after October 30 released prior to game; All times are in Eastern time

== Personnel ==
=== Coaching staff ===
Clemson Tigers football current coaching staff
Name	Position	Alma mater	Years at Clemson
Dabo Swinney	Head coach	University of Alabama (1993)	16th
Danny Pearman	Assistant head coach, Special Teams Coordinator, Tight Ends	Clemson University (1987)	11th
Jeff Scott	Co-offensive coordinator/wide receivers coach	Clemson University (2003)	11th
Brent Venables	Defensive coordinator/linebackers coach	Kansas State University (1992)	7th
Michael Reed	Defensive Backs Coach	Boston College (1994)	6th
Todd Bates	Assistant coach, Defensive tackles	University of Alabama (2004)	2nd
Tony Elliott	Co-offensive coordinator/running backs coach	Clemson University (2002)	8th
Robbie Caldwell	Assistant coach, Offensive Linemen	Furman University (1977)	8th
Brandon Streeter	Assistant coach, Recruiting Coordinator, Quarterbacks	Clemson University (1999)	5th
Mike Reed	Assistant coach, Cornerbacks	Boston College (1994)	6th
Mickey Conn	Assistant coach, Safeties	University of Alabama (1995)	3rd
Lemanski Hall	Assistant coach, Defensive Ends	University of Alabama (1993)	4th
Zac Alley	Graduate assistant	Clemson University (2014)	8th

=== Roster ===
2018 Clemson Tigers Football
Quarterback: 7 Chase Brice – (redshirt) freshman (6'2, 220); 12 Ben Batson – freshman (6'0, 200); 15 Patrick McClure – freshman (6'1, 195); 16 Trevor Lawrence – freshman (6'6, 215); Running back: 9 Travis Etienne Jr. – sophomore (5'10, 200); 21 Darien Rencher – (redshirt) sophomore (5'8, 195); 23 Lyn-J Dixon – freshman (5'10, 195); 26 Adam Choice – (redshirt) graduate (5'9, 220); 28 Tavien Feaster – junior (5'11, 215); 32 Sylvester Mayers – sophomore (5'6, 150); 35 Ty Thomason – (redshirt) junior (5'10, 225); 37 Ryan Mac Lain – senior (5'9, 175); Wide receiver: 1 Trevion Thompson – (redshirt) senior (6'2, 205); 3 Amari Rodgers – sophomore (5'10, 215); 5 Tee Higgins – sophomore (6'4, 210); 8 Justyn Ross – freshman (6'4, 210); 10 Derion Kendrick – freshman (6'0, 195); 13 Hunter Renfrow – (redshirt) senior (5'10, 185); 14 Diondre Overton – junior (6'4, 210); 17 Cornell Powell – junior (6'0, 210); 18 T.J. Chase – (redshirt) sophomore (6'0, 190); 22 Will Swinney – sophomore (5'8, 185); 45 Josh Jackson – (redshirt) sophomore (6'0, 195); 81 Drew Swinney – freshman (5'8, 180); 82 Will Brown – (redshirt) freshman (5'8, 185); 83 Carter Groomes – (redshirt) sophomore (5'8, 185); 85 Max May – freshman (6'1, 195); Tight end: 25 J.C. Chalk – (redshirt) sophomore (6'3, 260); 31 Cole Renfrow – (redshirt) sophomore (5'10, 235); 44 Garrett Williams – (redshirt) junior (6'2, 235); 80 Milan Richard – (redshirt) graduate (6'3, 255); 84 Cannon Smith – (redshirt) senior (6'4, 270); 86 Tyler Brown – (redshirt) sophomore (6'0, 220); 87 J.L Banks – (redshirt) junior (6'1, 240); 88 Braden Galloway – freshman (6'4, 240); Placekicker: 29 B. T. Potter – freshman (5'10, 175); 41 Alex Spence – (redshirt) graduate (6'2, 200); 92 Greg Huegel – (redshirt) senior (5'10, 195)	Offensive lineman: 50 Justin Falcinelli – OL – (redshirt) graduate (6'4, 315); 59 Gage Cervenka – OL – (redshirt) junior (6'3, 325); 62 Cade Stewart – OL – (redshirt) sophomore (6'3, 310); 64 Pat Godfrey – OL – (redshirt) graduate (6'2, 250); 65 Matt Bockhorst – OG – (redshirt) freshman (6'4, 310); 68 Noah DeHond – OT – (redshirt) freshman (6'7, 310); 70 Seth Penner – OG – senior (6'2, 325); 71 Jordan McFadden – OT – freshman (6'3, 300); 72 Blake Vinson – OT – (redshirt) freshman (6'4, 285); 73 Tremayne Anchrum – OT – junior (6'2, 310); 74 John Simpson – OG – junior (6'4, 330); 75 Mitch Hyatt – OT – senior (6'5, 310); 76 Sean Pollard – OL – junior (6'5, 315); 77 Zach Giella – OL – (redshirt) junior (6'6, 315); 78 Chandler Reeves – OT – (redshirt) sophomore (6'6, 295); 79 Jackson Carman – OL – freshman (6'5, 345); Defensive lineman: 3 Xavier Thomas – DE – freshman (6'2, 260); 7 Austin Bryant – DE – senior (6'6, 280); 13 KJ Henry – DE – freshman (6'4, 250); 17 Justin Mascoll – DE – freshman (6'4, 255); 22 Xavier Kelly – DL – (redshirt) sophomore (6'4, 270); 35 Justin Foster – DE – sophomore (6'2, 260); 42 Christian Wilkins – DT – graduate (6'4, 315); 44 Nyles Pinckney – DT – (redshirt) sophomore (6'1, 300); 45 Chris Register – DE – (redshirt) graduate (6'3, 260); 49 Richard Yeargin – DE – (redshirt) graduate (6'3, 260); 54 Logan Rudolph – DE – (redshirt) freshman (6'2, 245); 59 Jordan Williams – DT – (redshirt) freshman (6'4, 310); 67 Albert Huggins – DT – senior (6'3, 315); 90 Dexter Lawrence – DT – junior (6'4, 350); 91 Darnell Jefferies – DT – freshman (6'2, 275); 94 Jacob Edwards – DE – (redshirt) freshman (6'2, 285); 95 James Edwards – DT – (redshirt) freshman (6'2, 285); 97 Nick Rowell – DT – senior (6'3, 275); 99 Clelin Ferrell – DE – (redshirt) junior (6'4, 265); Punter: 48 Will Spiers – (redshirt) sophomore (6'5, 220); 97 Carson King – (redshirt) junior (5'11, 215); 98 Steven Sawicki – (redshirt) junior (6'3, 240)	Linebacker: 5 Shaq Smith – (redshirt) sophomore (6'2, 255); 6 Mike Jones Jr. – freshman (6'0, 230); 10 Baylon Spector – (redshirt) freshman (6'1, 230); 15 Jake Venables – freshman (6'1, 225); 30 Jalen Williams – graduate (5'9, 225); 33 J.D. Davis – graduate (6'1, 230); 34 Kendall Joseph – (redshirt) graduate (6'0, 235); 36 Judah Davis – graduate (6'1, 240); 43 Chad Smith – (redshirt) graduate (6'3, 245); 46 John Boyd – (redshirt) freshman (6'0, 215); 47 James Skalski – junior (6'0, 245); 48 Landon Holden – (redshirt) sophomore (6'1, 240); 52 Matthew King – senior (6'0, 230); 53 Regan Upshaw – (redshirt) sophomore (5'11, 235); 56 Luke Price – (redshirt) freshman (6'2, 230); 57 Tre Lamar – junior (6'4, 255); Defensive back: 1 Trayvon Mullen – CB – junior (6'1, 195); 2 Mark Fields – CB – senior (5'10, 180); 8 A. J. Terrell – CB – sophomore (6'2, 190); 9 Brian Dawkins Jr. – CB – (redshirt) sophomore (5'7, 170); 11 Isaiah Simmons – S – (redshirt) sophomore (6'2, 230); 12 K'Von Wallace – DB – junior (5'11, 210); 14 Denzel Johnson – S – (redshirt) junior (6'0, 205); 19 Tanner Muse – S – (redshirt) junior (6'1, 230); 20 LeAnthony Williams Jr. – CB – (redshirt) freshman (5'11, 180); 21 Kyler McMichael – CB – freshman (6'0, 200); 24 Nolan Turner – S – (redshirt) sophomore (6'1, 205); 27 Carson Donnelly – S – freshman (5'10, 180); 29 Michael Becker – S – freshman (6'1, 185); 31 Mario Goodrich – CB – freshman (6'0, 195); 32 Kyle Cote – S – (redshirt) graduate (5'9, 195); 37 Austin Jackson – S – (redshirt) junior (6'1, 210); 38 Elijah Turner – S – junior (5'11, 190); 39 Cameron Scott – CB – (redshirt) senior (5'9, 205); 40 Hall Morton – S – (redshirt) sophomore (5'8, 180); 45 Josh Jackson – DB – (redshirt) sophomore (6'1, 190); 47 Peter Cote – S – (redshirt) freshman (5'9, 185); Long snappers: 52 Austin Spence – (redshirt) junior (6'1, 200); 58 Patrick Phibbs – (redshirt) junior (6'2, 210); 71 Jack Maddox – (redshirt) freshman (6'3, 220)

=== Depth chart ===
Depth chart shown is one released for Oct 20 game vs. NC State.

Defense

FS
Tanner Muse
Denzel Johnson
⋅

SAM	MLB	SLB
Isaiah Simmons	Tre Lamar	Kendall Joseph
Jalen Williams	Judah Davis	J.D. Davis
Baylon Spector	Chad Smith	Shaq Smith

SS
K'Von Wallace
Nolan Turner
⋅

CB
A. J. Terrell
Mark Fields
Mario Goodrich

DE	DT	DT	DE
Clelin Ferrell	Christian Wilkins	Dexter Lawrence	Austin Bryant
Justin Foster	Albert Huggins	Nyles Pinckney	Xavier Thomas
KJ Henry	Xavier Kelly	Jordan Williams	Logan Rudolph

CB
Trayvon Mullen
Kyler McMichael
LeAnthony Williams

Offense

WR
Tee Higgins
Justyn Ross
Diondre Overton

WR
Hunter Renfrow
Trevion Thompson
T.J. Chase

LT	LG	C	RG	RT
Mitch Hyatt	John Simpson	Justin Falcinelli	Sean Pollard	Tremayne Anchrum
Jackson Carman	Matt Bockhorst	Gage Cervenka	Cade Stewart	Chandler Reeves
⋅	⋅	⋅	⋅	Blake Vinson

TE
Milan Richard
Braden Galloway
J.C. Chalk

WR
Amari Rodgers
Cornell Powell
Derion Kendrick

QB
Trevor Lawrence
Chase Brice
⋅

Special teams
PK Greg Huegel
PK B. T. Potter
P Will Spiers
P Carson King
KR Derion Kendrick
PR Amari Rodgers
LS Patrick Phibbs
Austin Spence
H Will Swinney

RB
Travis Etienne
Tavien Feaster
Adam Choice

== Rankings ==
Ranking movements Legend: ██ Increase in ranking ██ Decrease in ranking ( ) = First-place votes
	Week															
Poll	Pre	1	2	3	4	5	6	7	8	9	10	11	12	13	14	Final
AP	2 (18)	2 (12)	2 (6)	3	3 (1)	4 (1)	4 (1)	3	2	2	2	2	2	2	2	1 (61)
Coaches	2 (3)	2 (3)	2 (3)	2 (2)	2 (2)	4 (2)	4 (2)	3 (2)	2 (1)	2 (2)	2 (1)	2 (1)	2 (1)	2 (1)	2 (2)	1 (64)
CFP	Not released									2	2	2	2	2	2	Not released

== Game summaries ==
=== Furman ===
Furman Paladins at Clemson Tigers − Game summary

Quarter	1	2	3	4	Total
No. 23 (FCS) Furman	0	0	0	7	7
No. 2 Clemson	10	17	14	7	48

at Memorial Stadium • Clemson, SC

- Date: September 1, 2018
- Game time: 12:30 p.m.
- Game weather: Temperature: 83 °F (28 °C) • Wind: ENE 3 mph (4.8 km/h) • Weather: Sunny
- Game attendance: 80,048
- Referee: Riley Johnson
- TV announcers (ACCN): Tom Werme, David Archer, Lericia Harris

Game information

First quarter

- 07:50 CLEM TD – Kelly Bryant 40 yard pass to Amari Rodgers, (Greg Huegel PAT)
- 02:45 CLEM FG – Heugel 35 yard field goal

Second quarter

- 09:19 CLEM FG – Heugel 49 yard field goal
- 02:54 CLEM TD – Trevor Lawrence 6 yard pass to Diondre Overton, (Heugel PAT)
- 01:03 CLEM TD – Travis Etienne 7 yard run, (Heugel PAT)

Third quarter

- 05:26 CLEM TD – Bryant 35 yard run, (Heugel PAT)
- 00:08 CLEM TD – Lawrence 15 yard pass to Justyn Ross, (Heugel PAT)

Fourth quarter

- 13:42 CLEM TD – Lawrence 9 yard pass to Braden Galloway, (Heugel PAT)
- 01:18 FUR TD – Darren Grainger 16 yard pass to Ryan DeLuca, (Grayson Atkins PAT)

Top passers

- FUR – Darren Grainger: 3–5, 30 yards, 1 TD
- CLEM – Trevor Lawrence: 9–15, 137 yards, 3 TDs

Top rushers

- FUR – Deon Sanders: 4 rushes, 50 yards
- CLEM – Lyn-J Dixon: 6 rushes, 89 yards

Top Receiving

- FUR – Ryan DeLuca: 1 reception, 16 yards, 1 TD
- CLEM – Amari Rodgers: 3 receptions, 44 yards, 1 TD

Clemson's first game of the year was against in-state FCS foe Furman. Clemson won in a blowout, 48–7.

The Tigers' quarterback situation had dominated discussion of the team in the offseason, with 2017 starter Kelly Bryant in jeopardy of losing the starting job to highly touted true freshman Trevor Lawrence. The week before the season opener, head coach Dabo Swinney announced that Bryant would start the game against Furman but Lawrence would see significant playing time. Swinney stuck to the game plan, as Bryant played the first quarter, Lawrence the second, and each quarterback played in two drives to start the second half.

Clemson opened the scoring in the first quarter with a 40 yard touchdown pass from Kelly Bryant to Amari Rodgers. The next drive ended with a 35-yard field goal from kicker Greg Huegel to make the score 10–0. Trevor Lawrence's first drive in the second quarter also ended with a field goal by Huegel, this time from 49 yards. The next drive was an 11-play, 95-yard drive that ended with Lawrence's first career touchdown, a six-yard pass from Lawrence to Diondre Overton. Travis Etienne added another touchdown on the ground before the half to make the score 27–0. In the second half, Kelly Bryant scored on a 35-yard touchdown run, and Trevor Lawrence added two more touchdowns through the air. Furman scored their first points via a 16-yard touchdown pass with 1:18 left to go, bringing the final score to 48–7.

=== At Texas A&M ===
Clemson Tigers at Texas A&M Aggies− Game summary

Quarter	1	2	3	4	Total
No. 2 Clemson	7	7	14	0	28
Texas A&M	3	0	10	13	26

at Kyle Field • College Station, TX

- Date: September 8, 2018
- Game time: 7:00 p.m.
- Game weather: Temperature: 81 °F (27 °C) • Wind: W 6 mph (9.7 km/h) • Weather: Rain in the area
- Game attendance: 104,794
- Referee: Stuart Mullins
- TV announcers (ESPN): Rece Davis (Play-by-Play), Kirk Herbstreit (Color), Maria Taylor (Sideline)

Game information

First quarter

- 04:28 TAMU FG – Daniel LaCamera 40 yard field goal
- 01:23 CLEM TD – Kelly Bryant 1 yard run, (Greg Huegel PAT)

Second quarter

- 14:13 CLEM TD – Trevor Lawrence 64 yard pass to Tee Higgins, (Hugel PAT)

Third quarter

- 10:37 TAMU FG – Daniel LaCamera 40 yard field goal
- 04:59 CLEM TD – Bryant 8 yard pass to Diondre Overton, (Hugel PAT)
- 04:22 TAMU TD – Kellen Mond 9 yard pass to Kendrick Rogers, (LaCamera PAT)
- 01:01 CLEM TD – Travis Etienne 1 yard run, (Hugel PAT)

Fourth quarter

- 14:07 TAMU TD – Mond 14 yard pass to Quartney Davis, (LaCamera PAT)
- 00:46 TAMU TD – Mond 24 yard pass to Rogers, (2 PT attempt FAILED)

Top passers

- CLEM – Kelly Bryant: 12–17, 205 yards, 1 TD
- TAMU – Kellen Mond: 23–40, 430 yards, 3 TD

Top rushers

- CLEM – Kelly Bryant: 15 rushes, 54 yards, 1 TD
- TAMU – Kellen Mond: 10 rushes, 33 yards

Top Receiving

- CLEM – Tee Higgins: 3 receptions, 123 yards, 1 TD
- TAMU – Kendrick Rogers: 7 receptions, 120 yards, 2 TDs

In Clemson's second game of the season, the Tigers traveled to College Station, Texas to play Texas A&M of the SEC. Clemson held off a late Texas A&M comeback attempt to win 28–26.

Dabo Swinney again said he intended to play both Kelly Bryant and Trevor Lawrence at quarterback in the game against Texas A&M, as he did against Furman in week 1. Bryant started the game, scoring on a one-yard touchdown run late in the first quarter to take a 7–3 lead over the Aggies. Trevor Lawrence was brought in in the second quarter, completing a 64-yard touchdown pass to Tee Higgins on his first pass attempt, bringing the score to 14–3. A 50-yard field goal attempt by Texas A&M was blocked by Dexter Lawrence in the second quarter. Trevor Lawrence and Bryant struggled to score for the rest of the half, however, and the 14–3 score carried into halftime. In the third quarter, Clemson and Texas A&M traded touchdowns for several drives. Kelly Bryant completed an eight-yard touchdown pass to Diondre Overton to make the score 21–6 in favor of Clemson, which was answered by a nine-yard touchdown pass by Texas A&M's Kellen Mond to Kendrick Rogers. Clemson's Travis Etienne capped off a 75-yard drive with a one-yard touchdown run, and Texas A&M responded with another touchdown pass from Kellen Mond to bring the score to 28–20 Clemson. The Aggies were poised to score with less than two minutes remaining in the fourth quarter, but wide receiver Quartney Davis fumbled the ball near the goal line, which was ruled to have gone out of bounds in the endzone, resulting in a touchback and Clemson's ball. The Aggies forced a three-and-out, however, and regained possession with 1:12 left to play. Kellen Mond's offense marched down the field and scored a 24-yard touchdown completion to Kendrick Rogers with 46 seconds to go. The Aggies' two-point try to potentially tie the game ended with a Kellen Mond interception, however, and Clemson ran out the clock to end the game.

=== Georgia Southern ===
Georgia Southern Eagles at Clemson Tigers − Game summary

Quarter	1	2	3	4	Total
Georgia Southern	0	0	0	7	7
No. 2 Clemson	0	21	3	14	38

at Memorial Stadium • Clemson, SC

- Date: September 15, 2018
- Game time: Noon
- Game weather: Temperature: 84 °F (29 °C) • Wind: NNE 15 mph (24 km/h) • Weather: Mostly cloudy
- Game attendance: 79,844
- Referee: Jeff Heaser
- TV announcers (ESPNU): Anish Shroff, Ahmad Brooks, Alex Corddy

Game information

First quarter

- None

Second quarter

- 08:43 CLEM TD – Travis Etienne 1 yard run, (Greg Huegel PAT)
- 05:19 CLEM TD – Trevor Lawrence 57 yd pass to Justyn Ross, (Huegel PAT)
- 00:53 CLEM TD – Tavien Feaster 1 yard run, (Huegel PAT)

Third quarter

- 10:36 CLEM FG – Huegel 37 yard field goal

Fourth quarter

- 13:54 GS TD – Shai Werts 6 yard run, (Tyler Bass PAT)
- 06:06 CLEM TD – Etienne 40 yard run, (Huegel PAT)
- 02:03 CLEM TD – Adam Choice 10 yard run, (Huegel PAT)

Top passers

- GASO – Shai Werts: 2–8, 20 yards
- CLEM – Trevor Lawrence: 12–19, 194 yards, 1 TD

Top rushers

- GASO – Wesley Fields: 14 rushes, 27 yards
- CLEM – Travis Etienne: 16 rushes, 162 yards, 2 TDs

Top Receiving

- GASO – Obe Fortune: 2 receptions, 20 yards
- CLEM – Justyn Ross: 3 receptions, 103 yards, 1 TD

Clemson's third game of the season, a home game against Georgia Southern of the Sun Belt Conference, was put in jeopardy by Hurricane Florence. The hurricane made landfall near Wrightsville Beach, North Carolina the day before the game was set to be played, and was forecast to move south toward South Carolina late Saturday. Clemson officials decided not to cancel or change the location of the game, as was being done for other football games being played in the Carolinas that weekend, but did move game time up to noon from its originally scheduled time of 4:30 p.m. Clemson won the game 38–7 in front of a packed crowd at Memorial Stadium.

Clemson followed the pattern of its previous two games by starting Kelly Bryant at quarterback but bringing in Trevor Lawrence for equal playing time. The Tigers three drives in the first quarter all failed to score, ending with an interception thrown by Bryant, a missed field goal, and a fumble by Adam Choice, respectively. In the second quarter, Trevor Lawrence led a 93-yard drive that ended with a one-yard touchdown run by Travis Etienne. Bryant began the following drive at quarterback but came off the field due to an apparent injury. Two plays later, Trevor Lawrence completed a 57-yard touchdown pass to Justyn Ross. Clemson's next drive ended in a one-yard touchdown run by Tavien Feaster, bringing the score to 21–0 just before the half. In the second half, Kelly Bryant did not return from his injury, which head coach Dabo Swinney described as a chest bruise. After Clemson scored a 37-yard field goal by kicker Greg Huegel, Georgia Southern scored their only touchdown on the day early in the fourth quarter via a six-yard touchdown run by Shai Werts. Travis Etienne scored on a 40-yard touchdown run later in the quarter, which was followed by a 10-yard touchdown run by Adam Choice to bring the final score to 38–7. Etienne finished with a career-best 162 yards rushing and two touchdowns in the game. Trevor Lawrence improved his career best to 194 passing yards to go along with one touchdown and one interception.

=== At Georgia Tech ===
Clemson Tigers at Georgia Tech Yellow Jackets − Game summary

Quarter	1	2	3	4	Total
No. 3 Clemson	7	21	14	7	49
Georgia Tech	0	7	7	7	21

at Bobby Dodd Stadium • Atlanta, GA

- Date: September 22, 2018
- Game time: 3:30 p.m.
- Game weather: Temperature: 90 °F (32 °C) • Wind: NW • Weather: Partly Cloudy
- Game attendance: 50,595
- Referee: Jeff Flanagan
- TV announcers (ABC): Mark Jones (Play-by-Play), Dusty Dvoracek (Color), Molly McGrath (Sideline)

Game information

First quarter

- 03:42 CLEM TD – Fumble Recovery, (Greg Huegel PAT)

Second quarter

- 09:11 CLEM TD – Trevor Lawrence 17 yd pass to Hunter Renfrow, (Huegel PAT)
- 07:05 CLEM TD – Lawrence 53 yard pass to Justyn Ross, (Huegel PAT)
- 02:08 GT TD – TaQuon Marshall 11 yard run, (Shawn Davis PAT)
- 00:05 CLEM TD – Lawrence 3 yard pass to Travis Etienne, (Huegel PAT)

Third quarter

- 12:20 CLEM TD – Tavien Feaster 27 yard run, (Huegel PAT)
- 05:10 CLEM TD – Travis Etienne 3 yard run, (Huegel PAT)
- 01:43 GT TD – Nathan Cottrell 2 yard run, (Davis PAT)

Fourth quarter

- 06:15 GT TD – Tobias Oliver 5 yard pass to Clinton Lynch, (Davis PAT)
- 04:01 CLEM TD – Lawrence 30 yard pass to Tee Higgins, (Huegel PAT)

Top passers

- CLEM – Trevor Lawrence: 13–18, 176 yards, 4 TD, 1 INT
- GT – TaQuon Marshall: 2–6, 29 yards

Top rushers

- CLEM – Travis Etienne: 11 rushes, 122 yards, 1 TD
- GT – TaQuon Marshall: 25 rushes, 82 yards, 1 TD

Top Receiving

- CLEM – Amari Rodgers: 6 receptions, 63 yards
- GT – Clinton Lynch: 3 receptions, 57 yards, 1 TD

Clemson opened its ACC conference schedule with a road game against Georgia Tech. The Tigers won convincingly, 49–21.

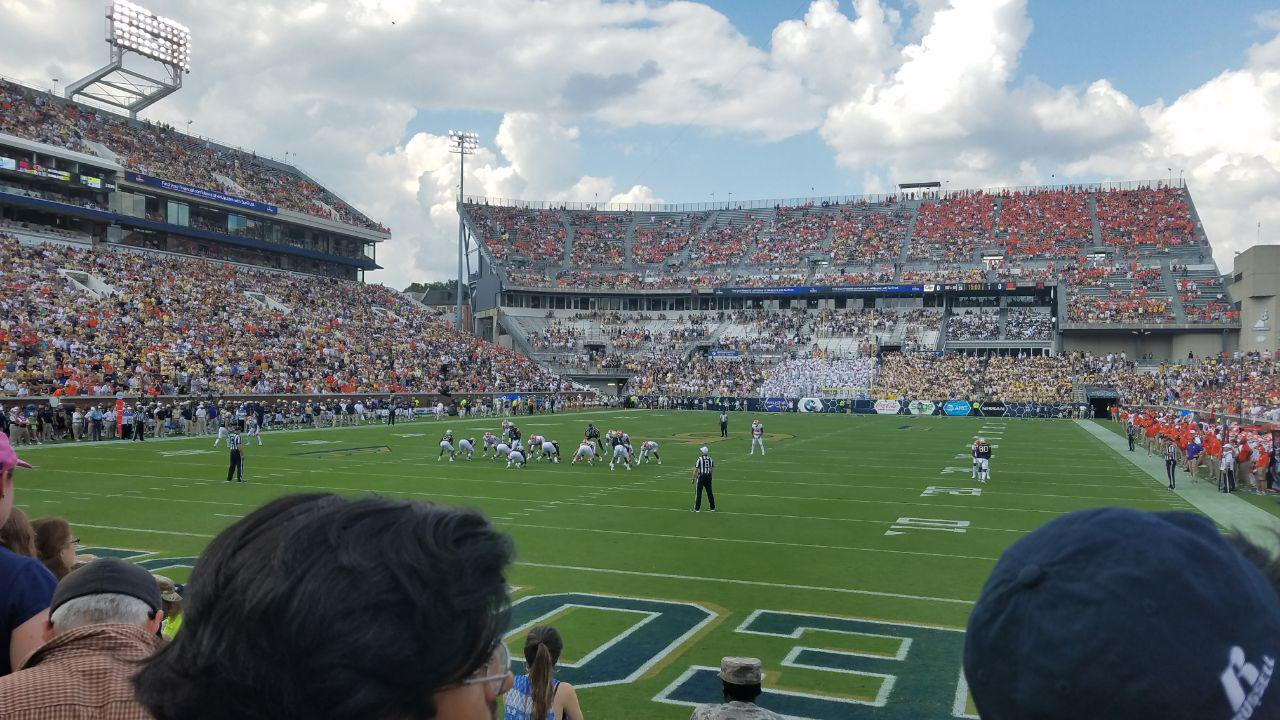
Clemson playing the Yellow Jackets in Atlanta

For what would prove to be the final time, Kelly Bryant started the game at quarterback. He played only two drives in the first half, both of which ended in punts, and after which Trevor Lawrence was brought in. Clemson's first score of the game was a fumble recovery in the end zone by Clelin Ferrell. The Tigers' next score came from a 17-yard touchdown pass from Trevor Lawrence to Hunter Renfrow. A 53-yard touchdown pass from Lawrence to Justyn Ross on the next drive made the game 21–0 in the second quarter. On the next drive, an intended screen pass from Lawrence deflected off a Clemson lineman and was caught by Georgia Tech's Desmond Branch. Georgia Tech then scored their lone points of the first half via an 11-yard touchdown run by TaQuon Marshall. Clemson led another touchdown drive, ending in a 3-yard pass from Lawrence to Travis Etienne, just before the half to make the score 28–7. The third quarter featured touchdown runs by Tavien Feater and Etienne, after which the score was 42–7. Georgia Tech added touchdowns via a two-yard score by Nathan Cottrell and a five-yard pass from Tobias Oliver to Clinton Lynch. The last score of the game was a 30-yard touchdown pass from Trevor Lawrence to Tee Higgins. Lawrence finished the day with 176 passing yards, four touchdown passes and one interception.

=== Syracuse ===
Syracuse Orange at Clemson Tigers − Game summary

Quarter	1	2	3	4	Total
Syracuse	6	10	0	7	23
No. 3 Clemson	7	0	6	14	27

at Memorial Stadium • Clemson, SC

- Date: September 29, 2018
- Game time: Noon
- Game weather: Temperature: 78 °F (26 °C) • Wind: 5 mph (8.0 km/h), ENE • Weather: Partly Cloudy
- Game attendance: 80,122
- Referee: Jeff Maconaghy
- TV announcers (ABC): Sean McDonough (Play-by-Play), Todd Blackledge (Color), Holly Rowe (Sideline)

Game information

First quarter

- 09:49 CUSE FG – Andre Szmyt 35 yard field goal
- 08:26 CUSE FG – Szmyt 51 yard field goal
- 00:54 CLEM TD – Travis Etienne 1 yard run, (Greg Huegel PAT)

Second quarter

- 07:31 CUSE TD – Eric Dungey 1 yard run, (Szmyt PAT)
- 00:24 CUSE FG – Szmyt 32 yard field goal

Third quarter

- 04:09 CLEM FG – Huegel 43 yard field goal
- 02:13 CLEM FG – Huegel 37 yard field goal

Fourth quarter

- 12:58 CUSE TD – Eric Dungey 1 yard run, (Szmyt PAT)
- 11:08 CLEM TD – Etienne 26 yard run, (Huegel PAT)
- 00:41 CLEM TD – Etienne 1 yard run, (Huegel PAT)

Top passers

- CUSE – Eric Dungey: 26–41, 250 yards, 1 INT
- CLEM – Trevor Lawrence: 10–15, 93 yards

Top rushers

- CUSE – Sean Riley: 2 rushes, 24 yards
- CLEM – Travis Etienne: 27 rushes, 203 yards, 3 TD

Top Receiving

- CUSE – Jamal Custis: 5 receptions, 73 yards
- CLEM – Tee Higgins: 4 receptions, 53 yards

Clemson's next game was their conference home opener against Syracuse, the team that had given Clemson their sole regular season loss the previous year. The Tigers led a fourth quarter comeback to win the 2018 match-up, 27–23.

The Clemson quarterback situation came to a head during the week leading up to the game. Head coach Dabo Swinney decided that Trevor Lawrence would be the starter going forward, supplanting 2017 starter Kelly Bryant, who had started each of the first four games but split drives with Lawrence. The next day, Bryant announced he intended to transfer schools. In order to take advantage of a new NCAA rule that allowed players to redshirt after appearing in a maximum of four games, Bryant, a senior, would have to sit the remainder of the year in order to save his remaining eligibility.

Syracuse opened the scoring in the game by scoring field goals on each of their first two drives. Trevor Lawrence led a 60-yard drive that ended with a one-yard touchdown run by Travis Etienne to make the score 7–6 Clemson at the end of the first quarter. Syracuse's Eric Dungey responded with a 70-yard drive that ended with him scoring a one-yard rushing touchdown to take the lead for the Orange. The following Clemson drive ended with Trevor Lawrence taking a hard hit to the head. He would not re-enter the game, and since Kelly Bryant could not enter the game without burning his redshirt, third-string quarterback Chase Brice would need to lead the Clemson comeback. Syracuse kicked another field goal to bring the score to 16–7 Syracuse at halftime.

In the third quarter, Greg Huegel kicked 43- and 37-yard field goals for Clemson to bring the score to 16–13 in favor of Syracuse. The Orange extended their lead to 10 points after recovering a muffed punt at the Clemson 10 yard line, after which Eric Dungey scored on a one-yard touchdown run. Travis Etienne cut the deficit back to three points with a 26-yard touchdown run with 11 minutes remaining in the fourth quarter. With six minutes remaining, Chase Brice and Etienne led the go-ahead, 94-yard scoring drive that ended with a one-yard touchdown run by Etienne with 41 seconds remaining in the game. Syracuse failed to move the ball in the final seconds, helped by two sacks by Clemson freshman Xavier Thomas, and the game was over. Travis Etienne ended with a career high 203 rushing yards and three touchdowns.

=== At Wake Forest ===
Clemson Tigers at Wake Forest Demon Deacons − Game summary

Quarter	1	2	3	4	Total
No. 4 Clemson	7	21	21	14	63
Wake Forest	0	0	3	0	3

at BB&T Field • Winston–Salem, NC

- Date: October 6, 2018
- Game time: 3:30 p.m.
- Game weather: Temperature: 79 °F (26 °C) • Wind: ESE 5 mph (8.0 km/h) • Weather: Partly Cloudy
- Game attendance: 31,608
- Referee: J. Magallenes
- TV announcers (ESPN): Beth Mowins (Play-by-Play), Anthony Becht (Color), Rocky Boiman (Sideline).

Game information

First quarter

- 06:21 CLEM TD – Travis Etienne 59-yard run (Greg Huegel PAT)

Second quarter

- 13:16 CLEM TD – Etienne 3-yard run (Huegel PAT)
- 9:53 CLEM TD – Trevor Lawrence 55-yd pass to Justyn Ross (Huegel PAT)
- 00:30 CLEM TD – Lawrence 20-yd pass to Tee Higgins (Huegel PAT)

Third quarter

- 13:45 CLEM TD – Etienne 70-yard run (Huegel PAT)
- 08:22 WAKE FG – Nick Sciba 25-Yd Field Goal
- 04:41 CLEM TD – Adam Choice 64-yard run (Huegel PAT)
- 02:21 CLEM TD – Lyn-J Dixon 65-yard run (Huegel PAT)

Fourth quarter

- 10:08 CLEM TD – Chase Brice 2-yd pass to Diondre Overton (B. T. Potter PAT)
- 00:48 CLEM TD – Dixon 52-yard run (Huegel PAT)

Top passers

- CLEM – Trevor Lawrence: 20–25, 175 yards, 2 TD, 0 INT
- WAKE – Sam Hartman 7–20, 74 yards, 0 TD, 1 INT

Top rushers

- CLEM – Travis Etienne: 10 rushes, 167 yards, 3 TD
- WAKE – Kendall Hinton: 11 rushes, 92 yards, 0 TD

Top Receiving

- CLEM – Justyn Ross: 5 receptions, 74 yards, 1 TD
- WAKE – Greg Dortch: 3 receptions, 37 yards, 0 TD

The Tigers' next game was a conference road game against Wake Forest. Clemson dominated the game, 63–3.

Quarterback Trevor Lawrence, back from the head injury he sustained the previous week, started the game. The Tigers offense struggled early in the game, failing to score on their first three drives. Travis Etienne opened the scoring in the first quarter with a 59-yard touchdown run. He added another touchdown run early in the second quarter to bring the score to 14–0. Trevor Lawrence passed for two first half touchdowns, first on a 55-yard connection to Justyn Ross, then on a 20-yard pass to Tee Higgins just before the half. In the third quarter, Etienne scored another long touchdown, this one from 70 yards on Clemson's first offensive play of the second half. Wake Forest scored their only points of the game, a 25-yard field goal by Nick Sciba, in the third quarter. Clemson running back Lyn-J Dixon scored two second half touchdowns, including a 65-yard touchdown run. Adam Choice had a 64-yard touchdown run as well. Etienne, Dixon, and Choice all surpassed 125 rushing yards on the day, the first time three Clemson players each surpassed that mark in one game. Players said they considered the rushing performance by the team a fitting tribute to former Clemson running back C.J. Fuller, a member of the 2016 championship team that died unexpectedly from a blood clot the week of this game.

=== NC State ===
NC State Wolfpack at Clemson Tigers − Game summary

Quarter	1	2	3	4	Total
No. 16 NC State	0	0	0	7	7
No. 3 Clemson	14	10	7	10	41

at Memorial Stadium • Clemson, SC

- Date: October 20, 2018
- Game time: 3:30 p.m.
- Game weather: Temperature: 72 °F (22 °C) • Wind: West 14 mph (23 km/h) • Weather: Sunny
- Game attendance: 81,295
- Referee: Jeff Flanagan
- TV announcers (ESPN): Sean McDonough (Play-by-Play), Todd Blackledge (Color), Holly Rowe (Sideline)

Game information

First quarter

- 11:23 CLEM TD – Travis Etienne 3 yard run, (Greg Huegel PAT)
- 02:59 CLEM TD – Trevor Lawrence 46 yd pass to Tee Higgins, (Huegel PAT)

Second quarter

- 00:46 CLEM TD – Etienne 2 yard run, (Huegel PAT)
- 00:02 CLEM FG – Huegel 28 yard field goal

Third quarter

- 03:54 CLEM TD – Etienne 1 yard run, (Huegel PAT)

Fourth quarter

- 14:56 NCST TD – Reggie Gallaspy 9 yard run, (Christopher Dunn PAT)
- 12:32 CLEM FG – Huegel 27 yard field goal
- 08:11 CLEM TD – Lyn-J Dixon 2 yard run, (Huegel PAT)

Top passers

- CLEM – Trevor Lawrence: 26–39, 308 yards, 1 TD
- NCST – Ryan Finley: 21–34, 156 yards, 2 INTs

Top rushers

- CLEM – Travis Etienne: 15 rushes, 39 yards, 3 TDs
- NCST – Reggie Gallaspy: 9 rushes, 59 yards, 1 TD

Top Receiving

- CLEM – Tee Higgins: 8 receptions, 119 yards, 1 TD
- NCST – Jakobi Meyers: 8 receptions, 61 yards

After Clemson's win against Wake Forest, the Tigers returned home to face their first ranked opponent in 2018, the 16th-ranked NC State Wolfpack. Clemson won in a rout, 41–7.

Clemson's first drive of the game was a 57-yard drive that ended with a three-yard touchdown run by Travis Etienne. Later in the first quarter, Trevor Lawrence completed a 46-yard touchdown pass to Tee Higgins as the Tigers jumped out to an early 14–0 lead. With 46 seconds left in the first half, Etienne ran for another short touchdown from two yards out. NC State quarterback Ryan Finley threw an interception to Clemson defender K'Von Wallace, who returned it to the NC State 4 yard line with 19 seconds in the half. Greg Huegel converted the 28-yard field goal to bring the score to 24–0 Clemson at halftime. In the third quarter, Travis Etienne scored his third touchdown of the day, a one-yard run that extended Clemson's lead to 31–0. NC State scored their only points on the day via a nine-yard touchdown run by Reggie Gallaspy II early in the fourth quarter. Clemson added another field goal by Huegel and a two-yard touchdown run by Lyn-J Dixon before the end of the game. Trevor Lawrence finished with a career best 308 passing yards in the game.

=== At Florida State ===
Clemson Tigers at Florida State Seminoles − Game summary

Quarter	1	2	3	4	Total
No. 2 Clemson	0	28	24	7	59
Florida State	0	0	3	7	10

at Doak Campbell Stadium • Tallahassee, FL

- Date: October 27, 2018
- Game time: Noon
- Game weather: Temperature: 63 °F (17 °C) • Wind: WNW 11 mph (18 km/h) • Weather: Cloudy
- Game attendance: 68,403
- Referee: Stuart Mullins
- TV announcers (ABC): Bob Wischusen (Play-by-Play), Brock Huard (Color), Allison Williams (Sideline)

Game information

First quarter

- None

Second quarter

- 13:19 CLEM TD – Trevor Lawrence 7 yd pass to Tee Higgins, (B. T. Potter PAT)
- 07:49 CLEM TD – Lawrence 3 yard pass to Higgins, (Greg Huegel PAT)
- 03:34 CLEM TD – Christian Wilkins 1 yard run, (Huegel PAT)
- 01:07 CLEM TD – Garrett Williams 2 yard run, (Huegel PAT)

Third quarter

- 14:12 CLEM TD – Lawrence 58 yard pass to Amari Rodgers, (Potter PAT)
- 10:18 CLEM FG – Potter 24 yard field goal
- 07:50 CLEM TD – Lawrence 68 yard pass to Rodgers, (Potter PAT)
- 04:35 FSU FG – Ricky Aguayo 35 yard field goal
- 02:10 CLEM TD – Chase Brice 5 yard pass to T.J. Chase, (Potter PAT)

Fourth quarter

- 13:50 CLEM TD – Adam Choice 15 yard run, (Potter PAT)
- 04:43 FSU TD – Keyshawn Helton 73 yard pass to James Blackman, (Aguayo PAT)

Top passers

- CLEM – Trevor Lawrence: 20–37, 314 yards, 4 TD
- FSU – Deondre Francois: 17–36, 180 yards, 1 INT

Top rushers

- CLEM – Travis Etienne: 10 rushes, 45 yards
- FSU – Jacques Patrick: 7 rushes, 17 yards

Top Receiving

- CLEM – Amari Rodgers: 6 receptions, 156 yards, 2 TD
- FSU – Keyshawn Helton: 3 receptions, 100 yards, 1 TD

Following the home win against NC State, Clemson traveled to Tallahassee, Florida to face Florida State, seeking to become the first ACC team to ever beat the Seminoles in four consecutive years. Clemson did so by winning in dominant fashion, 59–10.

Both offenses were held scoreless in the first quarter. Early in the second quarter, Trevor Lawrence opened the scoring for the Tigers with a seven-yard touchdown pass to Tee Higgins. The next Clemson drive ended the same way, with a three-yard touchdown pass from Lawrence to Higgins. Later in the quarter, Clemson lined up on the goal-line in a "Fridge Package" with defensive linemen Christian Wilkins and Dexter Lawrence in the backfield. Wilkins received the handoff and scored his first career rushing touchdown. Clemson scored another touchdown via a two-yard run by tight end Garrett Williams to bring the score to 28–0 before the half. In Clemson's first drive of the second half, Trevor Lawrence connected with Amari Rodgers for a 58-yard touchdown pass. The two connected again later in the quarter for a 68-yard score, after which it was 45–0 Clemson. Florida State kicker Ricky Aguayo completed a 35-yard field goal in the third quarter to break up the shutout. In the fourth quarter, Clemson running back Adam Choice scored on a 15-yard run. Florida State's final points came via a 73-yard pass from quarterback James Blackman to Keyshawn Helton with 4:43 left to go in the game. The final score of 59–10 was Florida State's worst home loss in program history.

=== Louisville ===
Louisville Cardinals at Clemson Tigers − Game summary

Quarter	1	2	3	4	Total
Louisville	3	0	6	7	16
No. 2 Clemson	14	21	28	14	77

at Memorial Stadium • Clemson, SC

- Date: November 3, 2018
- Game time: Noon
- Game weather: Temperature: 61 °F (16 °C) • Wind: SE 4 mph (6.4 km/h) • Weather: Clear and Sunny
- Game attendance: 78,741
- Referee: Jeff Heaser
- TV announcers (ABC): Mark Jones (Play-by-Play), Dusty Dvoracek (Color), Molly McGrath (Sideline)

Game information

First quarter

- 13:45 CLEM TD – Travis Etienne 10 yard run, (Greg Huegel PAT)
- 12:02 CLEM TD – Tavien Feaster 70 yard run, (Huegel PAT)
- 03:16 LOU FG – Blanton Creque 25 yard FG

Second quarter

- 14:56 CLEM TD – Trevor Lawrence 11 yard pass to Tee Higgins, (Huegel PAT)
- 11:42 CLEM TD – Isaiah Simmons 27 yard interception return, (Huegel PAT)
- 00:30 CLEM TD – Lawrence 3 yard pass to Amari Rodgers, (Huegel PAT)

Third quarter

- 10:15 CLEM TD – Dexter Lawrence 2 yard run, (Huegel PAT)
- 08:58 CLEM TD – Feaster 3 yard run, (Huegel PAT)
- 03:50 CLEM TD – Chase Brice 6 yard pass to Trevion Thompson, (Alex Spence PAT)
- 01:07 CLEM TD – Brice 59 yard pass to Justyn Ross, (Spence PAT)
- 00:54 LOU TD – Hassan Hall 93 yard kickoff return, (Creque PAT blocked)

Fourth quarter

- 14:52 CLEM TD – Lyn-J Dixon 55 yard run, (Spence PAT)
- 11:42 LOU TD – Malik Cunningham 10 yard run, (Creque PAT)
- 08:52 CLEM TD – Brice 8 yard pass to Will Swinney, (Spence PAT)

Top passers

- LOU – Malik Cunningham: 5–10, 121 yards
- CLEM – Chase Brice: 6–7, 110 yards, 3 TD

Top rushers

- LOU – Colin Wilson: 8 rushes, 26 yards
- CLEM – Travis Etienne: 8 rushes, 153 yards, 1 TD

Top Receiving

- LOU – Jaylen Smith: 5 receptions, 53 yards
- CLEM – Justyn Ross: 3 receptions, 74 yards, 1 TD

After the win against Florida State, Clemson returned home once again to play Louisville. The Tigers won in another blowout, 77–16.

Clemson received the kickoff the start the game, and on their opening drive marched down the field 75 yards and scored via a 10-yard touchdown run by Travis Etienne. The next Clemson drive was over after one play thanks to a 70-yard touchdown run by Tavien Feater, and the Tigers were up 14–0 less than three minutes into the game. After Louisville kicked a 25-yard field goal, Clemson finished another 75-yard drive with an 11-yard touchdown completion from Trevor Lawrence to Tee Higgins. Early in the second quarter, Louisville quarterback Jawon Pass threw a pass that was intercepted by Clemson's Isaiah Simmons and returned 27 yards for a touchdown. In the final minute of the half, Lawrence completed a three yard touchdown pass to Amari Rogers, and the score was 35–3 at halftime.

Early in the third quarter, Clemson brought out the "Fridge Package" on the goal-line, as they had done the week prior against Florida State. This time it was defensive lineman Dexter Lawrence that scored his first career rushing touchdown from two yards out. Louisville's next drive ended in another intercepted pass, returned to the Louisville nine yard line by Tanner Muse. Clemson running back Tavien Foster scored a three-yard touchdown three plays later. Backup quarterback Chase Brice played the rest of the game, and his next two drives ended in touchdown passes, first on a six-yard pass to Trevion Thompson, then on a 59-yard completion to Justyn Ross, after which the score was 63–3, still in the third quarter. Louisville's Steven Sawicki returned the ensuing kick-off 93 yards for their first touchdown of the day. Clemson running back Lyn-J Dixon ended the next drive with a 55-yard touchdown run. Louisville added another touchdown via a 10-yard run by Malik Cunningham, and Clemson ended the scoring on the day with Chase Brice's third touchdown pass, to Will Swinney for eight yards. Clemson's 77 points on the day were the most for the Tigers since an 82–24 victory over Wake Forest in Clemson's 1981 championship season.

=== At Boston College ===
Clemson Tigers at Boston College Eagles− Game summary

Quarter	1	2	3	4	Total
No. 2 Clemson	10	3	7	7	27
No. 17 Boston College	7	0	0	0	7

at Alumni Stadium • Chestnut Hill, MA

- Date: November 10, 2018
- Game time: 8:00 p.m.
- Game weather: Temperature: 34 °F (1 °C) • Wind: W 6 mph (9.7 km/h) • Weather: Clear
- Game attendance: 44,500
- Referee: Tra Blake
- TV announcers (ABC): Chris Fowler (Play-by-Play), Kirk Herbstreit (Color), Maria Taylor (Sideline)

Game information

First quarter

- 12:12 CLEM FG – Greg Huegel 30 yard field goal
- 06:22 BC TD – Michael Walker 74 yard punt return, (Colton Lichtenberg PAT)
- 01:18 CLEM TD – Trevor Lawrence 2 yd pass to Milan Richard, (Huegel PAT)

Second quarter

- 11:45 CLEM FG – Huegel 23 yard field goal

Third quarter

- 11:56 CLEM TD – Lawrence 6 yard run, (Huegel PAT)

Fourth quarter

- 11:39 CLEM TD – Amari Rodgers 58 yard punt return, (Huegel PAT)

Top passers

- CLEM – Trevor Lawrence: 29–40, 295 yards, 1 TD, 1 INT
- BC – E. J. Perry: 12–21, 98 yards

Top rushers

- CLEM – Travis Etienne: 11 rushes, 78 yards
- BC – A. J. Dillon: 16 rushes, 39 yards

Top Receiving

- CLEM – Hunter Renfrow: 8 receptions, 80 yards
- BC – Kobay White: 4 receptions, 65 yards

Clemson next traveled to play 17th-ranked Boston College in Chestnut Hill, Massachusetts, with a chance to clinch the ACC's Atlantic Division for the fourth consecutive year. The Tigers did just that, winning the game handily, 27–7. Boston College hosted ESPN's College GameDay that morning, where multiple analysts picked the Eagles to upset the Tigers.

Clemson received the kick-off and got as far as the Boston College 12 yard line but settled for a 30-yard field goal to take the 3–0 lead. Boston College's first possession ended with starting quarterback Anthony Brown being taken down by Clemson defensive lineman Christian Wilkins, suffering an apparent injury. He walked off the field under his own power but did not return to the game. Clemson's next possession ended in a punt, which was returned 74 yards for a touchdown by Boston College's Michael Walker. Clemson responded with a 70-yard touchdown drive that ended with a two-yard pass from Trevor Lawrence to Milan Richard to retake the lead. Clemson added another field goal from 23 yards out early in the second quarter. Both teams failed to score for the rest of the half, and the 13–7 score carried into halftime. Clemson's first offensive drive of the second half ended with Trevor Lawrence's first career rushing touchdown, a six yard run. Early in the fourth quarter, Amari Rogers returned a Boston College punt 58 yards for a touchdown, which brought the score to 27–7, which held until the end of the game.

=== Duke ===
Duke Blue Devils at Clemson Tigers − Game summary

Quarter	1	2	3	4	Total
Duke	6	0	0	0	6
No. 2 Clemson	0	14	14	7	35

at Memorial Stadium • Clemson, SC

- Date: November 17, 2018
- Game time: 7:00 p.m.
- Game weather: Temperature: 48 °F (9 °C) • Wind: NW 1 mph (1.6 km/h) • Weather: Clear
- Game attendance: 81,313
- Referee: Riley Johnson
- TV announcers (ESPN): Steve Levy (Play-by-Play), Brian Griese (Color), Todd McShay (Sideline)

Game information

First quarter

- 04:07 DUKE FG – Collin Wareham 34 yard Field Goal
- 00:22 DUKE FG – Wareham 32 yard Field Goal

Second quarter

- 12:44 CLEM TD – Tavien Feaster 2 yard run, (Greg Huegel PAT)
- 01:16 CLEM TD – Trevor Lawrence 19 yard pass to Justyn Ross, (Huegel PAT)

Third quarter

- 12:25 CLEM TD – Travis Etienne 27 yard run, (Huegel PAT)
- 04:20 CLEM TD – Etienne 29 yard run, (Huegel PAT)

Fourth quarter

- 11:21 CLEM TD – Lawrence 10 yard pass to T.J. Chase, (Huegel PAT)

Top passers

- DUKE – Daniel Jones: 24–43, 158 yards
- CLEM – Trevor Lawrence: 21–38, 251 yards, 2 TDs

Top rushers

- DUKE – Deon Jackson: 11 rushes, 51 yards
- CLEM – Travis Etienne: 9 rushes, 81 yards, 2 TDs

Top Receiving

- DUKE – Daniel Helm: 3 receptions, 38 yards
- CLEM – Justyn Ross: 4 receptions, 76 yards, 1 TD

Clemson's last conference game was a home game against Duke. The Tigers secured a perfect conference finish by beating the Blue Devils 35–6.

Clemson's offense started out slow, punting on each of their first three drives, and the defense allowed two Duke field goals, bringing the score to 6–0 in favor of Duke at the end of the first quarter. But Clemson completed a 75-yard drive that ended with a two-yard Tavien Feaster touchdown run early in the second quarter to take the lead. With 1:16 left in the first half, the Tigers added another touchdown via a 19-yard pass from Trevor Lawrence to Justyn Ross, and the score was 14–6 at the half. In the second half, Clemson scored on three straight drives to bring the game out of reach. First, Travis Etienne scored a 27-yard touchdown run, followed by a 29-yard touchdown run on the next drive. Trevor Lawrence completed a 10-yard touchdown pass to T.J. Chase early in the fourth quarter to bring the score to 35–6, which held until the end of the game. Lawrence finished with 251 yards and two touchdowns on the day.

=== South Carolina ===
South Carolina Gamecocks at Clemson Tigers − Game summary

Quarter	1	2	3	4	Total
South Carolina	7	14	0	14	35
No. 2 Clemson	14	14	14	14	56

at Memorial Stadium • Clemson, SC

- Date: November 24, 2018
- Game time: 7:00 p.m.
- Game weather: Temperature: 49 °F (9 °C) • Wind: NNW 2 mph (3.2 km/h) • Weather: Clear
- Game attendance: 81,436
- Referee: Matt Loeffler
- TV announcers (ESPN): Steve Levy (Play-by-Play), Brian Griese (Color), Todd McShay (Sideline)

Game information

First quarter

- 10:41 USC TD – Jake Bentley 9 yard pass to Deebo Samuel, (Parker White PAT)
- 06:17 CLEM TD – Adam Choice 1 yard run, (Greg Huegel PAT)
- 00:17 CLEM TD – Trevor Lawrence 22 yard pass to Tee Higgins, (Huegel PAT)

Second quarter

- 07:23 CLEM TD – Christian Wilkins 1 yard run, (Huegel PAT)
- 06:29 USC TD – Bentley 67 yard pass to Keil Pollard, (White PAT)
- 04:49 CLEM TD – Choice 2 yard run, (Huegel PAT)
- 04:37 USC TD – Bentley 75 yard pass to Samuel, (White PAT)

Third quarter

- 10:21 CLEM TD – Travis Etienne 2 yard run, (Huegel PAT)
- 06:46 CLEM TD – Tavien Feaster 13 yard run, (Huegel PAT)

Fourth quarter

- 12:05 CLEM TD – Choice 15 yard run, (Huegel PAT)
- 09:10 USC TD – Bentley 32 yard pass to Samuel, (White PAT)
- 03:37 USC TD – Bentley 20 yard pass to Shi Smith, (White PAT)
- 00:39 CLEM TD – Etienne 7 yard run, (Huegel PAT)

Top passers

- USC – Jake Bentley: 32–50, 510 yards, 5 TDs, 1 INT
- CLEM – Trevor Lawrence: 27–36, 393 yards, 1 TD

Top rushers

- USC – Mon Denson: 17 rushes, 64 yards
- CLEM – Travis Etienne: 28 rushes, 150 yards, 2 TDs

Top Receiving

- USC – Deebo Samuel: 10 receptions, 210 yards, 3 TDs
- CLEM – Tee Higgins: 6 receptions, 142 yards, 1 TD

Clemson's last game of the regular season was against in-state rival South Carolina, a member of the Southeastern Conference. Clemson won the game 56–35 to secure a perfect 12–0 regular season, their first since 2015 and third in school history.

South Carolina received the opening kick-off, and marched down the field 75 yards on their first drive and scored on a nine-yard touchdown pass from Jake Bentley to Deebo Samuel. Clemson responded with their own 75-yard drive, which ended with a one-yard score by Adam Choice. The next Clemson drive ended with a 22-yard touchdown pass from Trevor Lawrence to Tee Higgins, bringing the score to 14–7 Clemson. One drive later, defensive lineman Christian Wilkins scored on fourth and one from the South Carolina one yard line, his second rushing touchdown on the year. South Carolina responded with a 67-yard touchdown pass from Bentley to Kiel Pollard, and the score was 21–14 Clemson in the second quarter. Clemson and South Carolina traded touchdowns again before the end of the half, first with Clemson's Adam Choice scoring a two-yard touchdown run, followed by a 75-yard connection from South Carolina's Jake Bentley to Deebo Samuel. Clemson's Greg Huegel missed a 39-yard field goal at the end of the half, and the score was 28–21 Clemson at halftime.

The Tigers started the second half with a 10-play, 75-yard drive that ended with a 2-yard touchdown run by Travis Etienne. The two following Clemson drives ended with a 13-yard touchdown run by Tavien Feaster and then a 15-yard touchdown run by Adam Choice to extend their lead to 49–21 early in the fourth quarter. South Carolina added two touchdowns, first by a 32-yard touchdown pass from Bentley to Samuel, then by a 20-yard touchdown pass from Bentley to Shi Smith with 3:37 left to play. Travis Etienne added another Clemson touchdown via a 7-yard run in the last minute of the game, bringing the final score to 56–35. The 35 points surrendered by the Tigers was the most given up by the team since the 2016 ACC Championship Game against Virginia Tech. Trevor Lawrence threw for a career-high 393 yards in the game. Jake Bentley set the South Carolina single-game passing record (510 yds.) in the loss.

=== Pittsburgh – ACC Championship Game ===
Clemson Tigers vs Pittsburgh Panthers − Game summary

Quarter	1	2	3	4	Total
No. 2 Clemson	14	14	0	14	42
Pittsburgh	3	7	0	0	10

at Bank of America Stadium • Charlotte, NC

- Date: December 1, 2018
- Game time: 8:00 p.m.
- Game weather: Temperature: 55 °F (13 °C) • Wind: ESE 7 mph (11 km/h) • Weather: Rain
- Game attendance: 67,784
- Referee: Jeff Heaser
- TV announcers (ABC/ESPN Radio): Chris Fowler (Play-by-play), Kirk Herbstreit (Color), Maria Taylor (Sideline)

Game information

First quarter

- 14:47 CLEM TD – Travis Etienne 75 yard run, (Greg Huegel PAT)
- 09:29 CLEM TD – Etienne 3 yard run, (Huegel PAT)
- 01:46 PITT FG – Alex Kessman 37 yard field goal

Second quarter

- 07:56 PITT TD – Qadree Ollison 1 yard run, (Kessman PAT)
- 04:57 CLEM TD – Trevor Lawrence 5 yard pass to Tee Higgins, (Huegel PAT)
- 00:25 CLEM TD – Lawrence 10 yard pass to Higgins, (Huegel PAT)

Fourth quarter

- 14:27 CLEM TD – Adam Choice 1 yard run, (Huegel PAT)
- 03:17 CLEM TD – Lyn-J Dixon 4 yard run, (Huegel PAT)

Top passers

- CLEM - Trevor Lawrence: 12–24, 118 yards, 2 TDs
- PITT - Kenny Pickett: 4–16, 8 yards, 1 INT

Top rushers

- CLEM - Travis Etienne: 12 carries, 156 yards, 2 TDs
- PITT - Darrin Hall: 14 carries, 86 yards

Top Receiving

- CLEM - Tee Higgins: 3 receptions, 36 yards, 2 TDs
- PITT - Rafael Araujo-Lopes: 2 receptions, 10 yards

Clemson, champions of the Atlantic Coast Conference's Atlantic Division, faced off against Coastal Division champion Pittsburgh in the 2018 ACC Championship Game, played in Charlotte, North Carolina. Clemson won the game in a blowout, 42–10, to secure their fourth consecutive ACC title.

On the very first offensive play of the game, Clemson running back Travis Etienne ran 75 yards for a touchdown to give the Tigers the early lead. Later in the first quarter, Clemson safety Isaiah Simmons forced a Pittsburgh fumble on their own 21 yard line, which was returned to the three yard line by Christian Wilkins. Travis Etienne scored on a three-yard run on the next play. Pittsburgh got on the board later in the quarter with a 37-yard field goal by Alex Kessman. A one-yard touchdown run by Pittsburgh's Qadree Ollison made the score 14–10 Clemson midway through the second quarter. Trevor Lawrence extended the lead with a five-yard touchdown completion to Tee Higgins. In the final minute of the half, Pittsburgh quarterback Kenny Pickett threw an interception to Clemson's A.J. Terrell, who returned it to the Pittsburgh 10 yard line. Lawrence and Higgins connected again on the following play to bring the score to 28–10 at halftime.

Both offenses were held scoreless in the third quarter. In the early fourth quarter, Adam Choice closed out a 69-yard Clemson drive with a one-yard touchdown run. Later in the quarter, Lyn-J Dixon scored on a four-yard touchdown run, bringing the score to 42–10, which held until the end of the game. Travis Etienne finished with 156 rushing yards and two touchdowns in the game.

=== Notre Dame – Cotton Bowl ===
Clemson Tigers vs Notre Dame Fighting Irish − Game summary

Quarter	1	2	3	4	Total
No. 3 Notre Dame	3	0	0	0	3
No. 2 Clemson	3	20	7	0	30

at AT&T Stadium • Arlington, Texas

- Date: December 29, 2018
- Game time: 4:00 p.m.
- Game weather: Temperature: 72 °F (22 °C) • Wind: N/A - indoors • Weather: N/A - indoors
- Game attendance: 72,183
- Referee: Matt Austin
- TV announcers (ESPN): Sean McDonough (Play-by-Play), Todd Blackledge (Color), Holly Rowe and Tom Rinaldi (Sideline)

Game information

First quarter

- 08:35 CLEM FG – Greg Huegel 40 yard field goal
- 04:31 ND FG – Justin Yoon 28 yard field goal

Second quarter

- 12:50 CLEM TD – Trevor Lawrence 52 yard pass to Justyn Ross, (Huegel PAT blocked)
- 01:44 CLEM TD – Lawrence 42 yard pass to Ross, (Huegel PAT)
- 00:02 CLEM TD – Lawrence 19 yard pass to Tee Higgins, (Huegel PAT)

Third quarter

- 02:04 CLEM TD – Travis Etienne 62 yard run, (Huegel PAT)

Fourth quarter

- None

Top passers

- CLEM - Trevor Lawrence: 27–39, 327 yards, 3 TDs
- ND - Ian Book: 17–34, 160 yards, 1 INT

Top rushers

- CLEM - Travis Etienne: 14 rushes, 109 yards, 1 TD
- ND - Dexter Williams: 16 rushes, 54 yards

Top Receiving

- CLEM - Justyn Ross: 6 receptions, 148 yards, 2 TDs
- ND - Miles Boykin: 5 receptions, 69 yards

In the final College Football Playoff rankings of the year, released on December 2, Clemson was ranked second, which earned them a spot in the CFP semifinal to be played at the 2018 Cotton Bowl Classic. Their opponent was the Notre Dame Fighting Irish, ranked third by the playoff committee and also undefeated. The winner would go on to the 2019 College Football Playoff National Championship to play the winner of the other semifinal game, the 2018 Orange Bowl. Clemson opened as an 11.5-point favorite against the Irish by Las Vegas sportsbooks. Prior to the game, starting defensive lineman Dexter Lawrence and two backups, Zach Giella and Braden Galloway, tested positive for a banned substance, ostarine, and were told by the NCAA they must sit out the Cotton Bowl while awaiting results of further tests.

The Cotton Bowl Classic began with both teams trading field goals in the first quarter. Early in the second quarter, Clemson scored their first touchdown via a 52-yard touchdown pass from Trevor Lawrence to Justyn Ross. Greg Huegel's extra point attempt was blocked, and the score was 9–3 Clemson. Lawrence and Ross connected again later in the quarter, this time on a 42-yard touchdown pass with 1:44 left to go in the half. Clemson got the ball back with 46 seconds to go, and Trevor Lawrence led an 80-yard drive in that time that ended with a 19-yard pass to Tee Higgins to extend their lead to 23–3 at halftime. In the third quarter, Travis Etienne scored on a 62-yard touchdown run. Both teams failed to score for the rest of the game, and 30–3 was the final score. Trevor Lawrence finished with 327 yards and was awarded MVP of the game along with defensive lineman Austin Bryant.

=== Alabama – CFP National Championship ===
Clemson Tigers vs Alabama Crimson Tide − Game summary

Quarter	1	2	3	4	Total
No. 2 Clemson	14	17	13	0	44
No. 1 Alabama	13	3	0	0	16

at Levi's Stadium • Santa Clara, California

- Date: January 7, 2019
- Game time: 8:00 p.m.
- Game weather: Temperature: 61 °F (13 °C) • Wind: SE 5-10 mph (8-16 km/h) • Weather: Cloudy
- Game attendance: 74,814
- Referee: Mike Cannon (Big Ten)
- TV announcers (ESPN): Chris Fowler (Play-by-Play), Kirk Herbstreit (Color), Tom Rinaldi and Maria Taylor (Sideline)

Game information

First quarter

- 13:20 CLEM TD: A. J. Terrell 44 yard interception return, (Greg Huegel PAT)
- 12:05 ALA TD: Tua Tagovailoa 62 yard pass to Jerry Jeudy, (Joseph Bulovas PAT)
- 10:35 CLEM TD: Travis Etienne 17 Yd Run, (Huegel PAT)
- 6:23 ALA TD: Hale Hentges 1 Yd pass from Tagovailoa, (Bulovas PAT failed)

Second quarter

- 14:18 ALA FG: Bulovas 25 Yd Field Goal
- 11:38 CLEM TD: Etienne 1 Yd Run, (Huegel Kick)
- 4:38 CLEM TD: Etienne 5 Yd pass from Trevor Lawrence, (Huegel PAT)
- 0:45 CLEM FG: Huegel 36 Yd Field Goal

Third quarter

- 8:26 CLEM TD: Justyn Ross 74 Yd pass from Lawrence, (Greg Huegel PAT failed)
- 0:21 CLEM TD: Tee Higgins 5 Yd pass from Lawrence, (Huegel PAT)

Fourth quarter

- None

Top passers

- CLEM - Trevor Lawrence: 20–32, 347 yards, 3 TD
- ALA - Tua Tagovailoa: 22-34, 295 yards, 2 TD, 2 INT

Top rushers

- CLEM - Travis Etienne: 14 rushes, 86 yards, 2 TD
- ALA - Najee Harris: 9 rushes, 59 yards

Top receiving

- CLEM - Justyn Ross: 6 receptions, 153 yards, 1 TD
- ALA - Jerry Jeudy: 5 receptions, 139 yards, 1 TD

By winning the Cotton Bowl Classic, Clemson advanced to the 2019 College Football Playoff National Championship to play the winner of the Orange Bowl, Alabama. This was Clemson's third appearance in the CFP championship game in four years, all of which were played against Alabama. The Crimson Tide won their first CFP match-up in 2016 (2015 season), and Clemson won the rematch in 2017 (2016 season). The Crimson Tide and Tigers also met in the CFP semifinals the previous season, where Alabama was victorious in the 2018 Sugar Bowl. Alabama opened as the 6.5-point favorite in the 2019 match-up. The three Clemson players that had been suspended for the Cotton Bowl for testing positive for a banned substance, including Dexter Lawrence, were again suspended for the national championship game after NCAA tests confirmed the prior results.

Clemson received the opening kickoff of the Championship Game but was forced to punt after a three-and-out. The following Alabama drive ended in an uncharacteristic pick-six interception thrown by Alabama's Tua Tagovailoa, returned 44 yards by A.J. Terrell after being tipped by blitzing safety Isaiah Simmons in the backfield. Alabama responded with a three-play, 75-yard drive that ended with a 62-yard touchdown from Tagovaila to Jerry Jeudy to even the score at seven apiece. Clemson's next drive included a 62-yard pass from Trevor Lawrence to Tee Higgins and ended with a 17-yard touchdown by Travis Etienne. The high-scoring first quarter continued as Alabama marched down the field again and scored on a one-yard pass from Tagovailoa to Hale Hentges. Alabama's extra point missed, and the score was 14–13 Clemson at the end of the first quarter. Early in the second quarter, Alabama's Joseph Bulovas kicked a 25-yard field goal to take the lead for the Crimson Tide. Clemson's next two drives both ended with Travis Etienne touchdowns, the first a one-yard run and the second a five-yard reception from Trevor Lawrence. Clemson kicked a 36-yard field goal in the final minute of the half, bringing a 31–16 lead into halftime.

In the second half, Alabama received the kick and advanced to the Clemson 24 yard line, but failed to convert a fake field goal on 4th and 6, turning the ball over. Clemson scored three plays later via a 74-yard pass from Trevor Lawrence to Justyn Ross. Alabama was again stopped on their next drive, and Clemson marched 89 yards down the field to score a five-yard touchdown pass from Lawrence to Tee Higgins, after which the score was 44–16 at the end of the third quarter. Clemson's defense held the Alabama offense scoreless on the next two drives. The Tigers received the ball on their own one yard line with 10:02 left to go in the game, and were able to completely wind down the clock over the course of a 14-play, 94-yard drive that ended the game. Trevor Lawrence threw for 347 yards and three touchdowns in the game and was named offensive MVP. Cornerback Trayvon Mullen, who intercepted a first-half pass by Tua Tagovailoa and returned it 46 yards, was named defensive MVP.

== Awards and honors ==
Individual Awards
Player	Position	Award	Ref.
Travis Etienne	RB	ACC Player of the Year; ACC Offensive Player of the Year	
Trevor Lawrence	QB	Archie Griffin Award; ACC Rookie of the Year; ACC Offensive Rookie of the Year	
Clelin Ferrell	DL	Ted Hendricks Award; ACC Defensive Player of the Year	
Mitch Hyatt	OT	Jacobs Blocking Trophy	
Hunter Renfrow	WR	Burlsworth Trophy	
Christian Wilkins	DL	Campbell Trophy	
Dabo Swinney	Head coach	Woody Hayes Trophy; Bear Bryant Award; ACC Coach of the Year	

All-American
Player	AP	AFCA	FWAA	TSN	WCFF	Designation
Christian Wilkins	1	1	1	1	1	Unanimous
Mitch Hyatt	1	1	1	2	1	Consensus
Clelin Ferrell	1	1		1	1	Consensus
Travis Etienne	2	2	2	1	2	
Dexter Lawrence		1				
Tre Lamar		2				
Trayvon Mullen		2				
The NCAA recognizes a selection to all five of the AP, AFCA, FWAA, TSN and WCFF first teams for unanimous selections and three of five for consensus selections.

All-ACC
Player	Position	Team
Travis Etienne	RB	1st
Mitch Hyatt	OT	1st
Clelin Ferrell	DE	1st
Christian Wilkins	DT	1st
Dexter Lawrence	DT	1st
Trevor Lawrence	QB	2nd
Tee Higgins	WR	2nd
Tremayne Anchrum	OT	2nd
Sean Pollard	OT	2nd
Justin Falcinelli	C	2nd
Tre Lamar	LB	2nd
Trayvon Mullen	CB	2nd
Hunter Renfrow	WR	3rd
John Simpson	OG	3rd
Austin Bryant	DE	3rd
A. J. Terrell	CB	3rd
Tanner Muse	S	3rd
Amari Rodgers	WR	HM
K'Von Wallace	S	HM
Greg Huegel	K	HM
HM = Honorable mention. Source:

== 2019 NFL draft ==
The 2019 NFL draft was held on April 25–27 in Nashville, Tennessee. Six Clemson players were selected as part of the draft, including a school record three taken in the first round. Five additional Clemson players were signed to NFL teams as undrafted free agents.

Player	Team	Round	Pick #	Position
Clelin Ferrell	Oakland Raiders	1st	4	DE
Christian Wilkins	Miami Dolphins	1st	13	DT
Dexter Lawrence	New York Giants	1st	17	DT
Trayvon Mullen	Oakland Raiders	2nd	40	CB
Austin Bryant	Detroit Lions	4th	117	DE
Hunter Renfrow	Oakland Raiders	5th	149	WR

=== Undrafted Free Agents ===
Player	Team	Position	Ref
Tre Lamar	Detroit Lions	LB	
Trevion Thompson	Los Angeles Chargers	WR	
Albert Huggins	Houston Texans	DT	
Mark Fields	Kansas City Chiefs	CB	
Mitch Hyatt	Dallas Cowboys	OT	

== Notes ==
- Clemson scored a total of 664 points during the season, which set a school record.

== Legacy ==
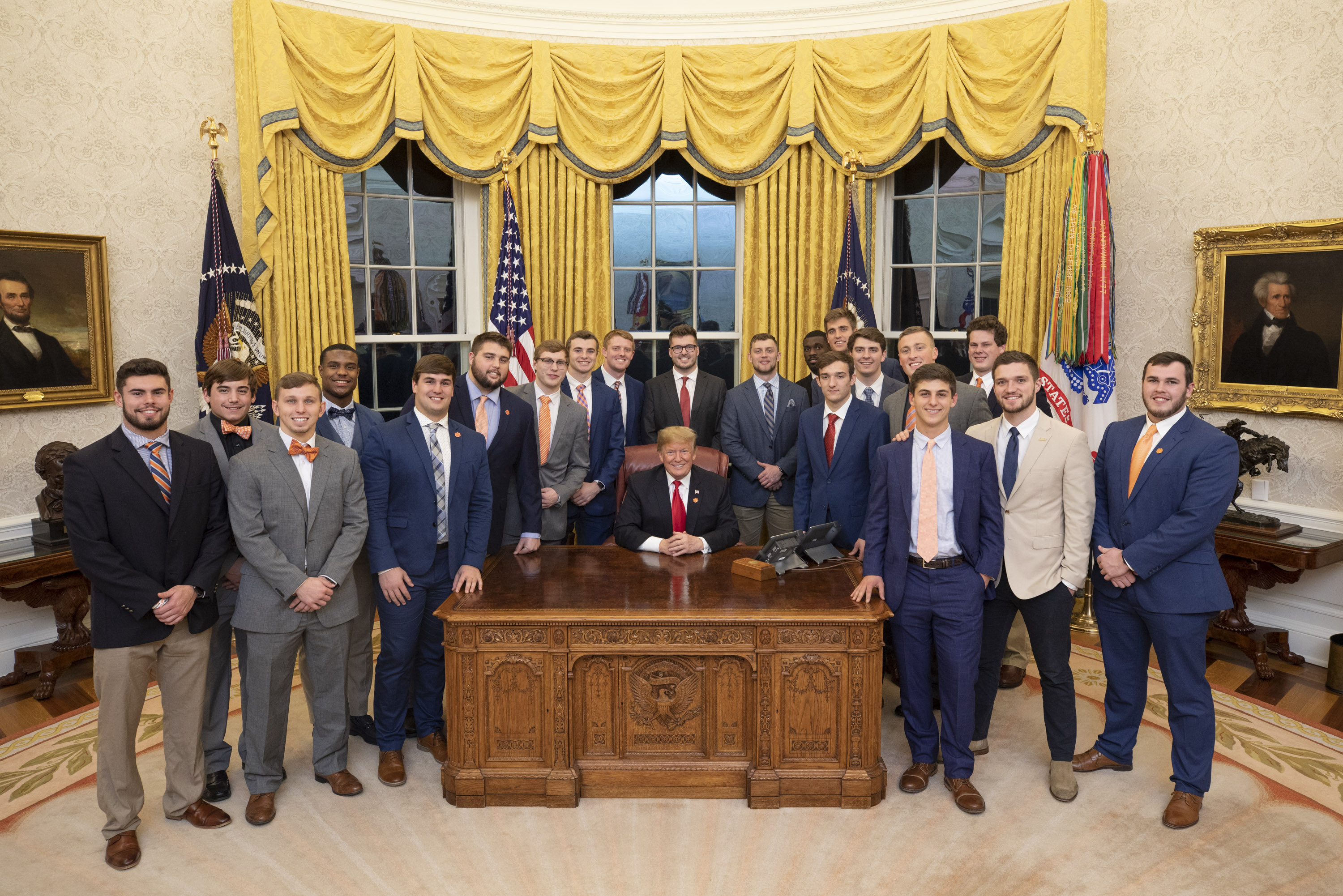
Members of the 2018 Clemson Tigers football team pose with President Trump in the Oval Office

Multiple analysts and media outlets have discussed the 2018 Clemson team as being one of the best in college football history, in league with 2001 Miami, 1995 Nebraska, and other all-time great teams, due to its historic margin of victory (32 points per game), record (15–0), and dominance in victories over highly ranked teams. Clemson became the first team in over forty years to beat two top 5 teams (AP Poll) by at least 25 points. Clemson accomplished the feat in 11 days. The Tigers won 13 of 15 games by at least 20 points, including the last ten in a row.

The Tigers' national championship victory celebration at the White House made headlines due to the government shutdown. The White House residence staff, which would normally prepare the meal, was not working so President Donald Trump served them large amounts of fast food, including burgers, french fries and pizza, for the team. Despite widespread controversy, some of the Clemson players said they enjoyed the meal and the experience.
