= Mario Goodrich =

American football player (born 2000)

Profile
- Position: Cornerback

Personal information
- Born: January 12, 2000 (age 26); Kansas City, Missouri, U.S.
- Listed height: 6 ft 0 in (1.83 m)
- Listed weight: 186 lb (84 kg)

Career information
- High school: Lee's Summit West (Lee's Summit, Missouri)
- College: Clemson (2018–2021)
- NFL draft: 2022: undrafted

Career history
- Philadelphia Eagles (2022–2023); New York Giants (2024)*; Birmingham Stallions (2025); Denver Broncos (2025)*; New York Jets (2025)*; Birmingham Stallions (2026); Tennessee Titans (2026)*
- * Offseason or practice squad member only

Awards and highlights
- CFP national champion (2018); First-team All-ACC (2021)

Career NFL statistics as of 2024
- Total tackles: 5
- Stats at Pro Football Reference

Mario Goodrich III (born January 12, 2000) is an American professional football cornerback. He played college football at Clemson, winning a national championship in 2018. He was signed as an undrafted free agent by the Philadelphia Eagles in 2022.

== Early life ==
Goodrich attended Lee's Summit West High School in Lee's Summit, Missouri. He played cornerback and wide receiver in high school. During his career he had 140 tackles, 11 interceptions on defense and 38 receptions for 641 yards on offense with 22 total touchdowns. He originally committed to the University of Nebraska–Lincoln to play college football before switching to Clemson University.

== College career ==
Goodrich played in 14 games as a true freshman at Clemson in 2018, recording six tackles. In 2019 he played in 13 games and had seven tackles and one interceptions. In 2020 he started four of eight games, recording 13 tackles and two interceptions. As a senior in 2021, he had 42 tackles, two interceptions and a touchdown in 12 starts. He was named the MVP of the 2021 Cheez-It Bowl in his final collegiate game.

=== College statistics ===
Season	GP	Tackles					Interceptions					Fumbles		
Season	GP	Solo	Ast	Cmb	TfL	Sck	Int	Yds	Avg	TD	PD	FR	FF	TD
2018	5	4	2	6	0.0	0.0	0	0	0	0	3	0	0	0
2019	8	3	4	7	0.5	0.0	1	0	0.0	0	2	0	0	0
2020	7	3	4	7	0.0	0.0	2	5	2.5	0	2	1	0	0
2021	11	26	16	42	0.0	0.0	2	20	10.0	1	9	0	1	0
Career	31	39	29	68	0.5	0.0	5	25	5.0	1	15	1	1	0

== Professional career ==
Pre-draft measurables
Height	Weight	Arm length	Hand span	Wingspan	40-yard dash	10-yard split	20-yard split	Vertical jump	Broad jump
6 ft 0 1/4 in (1.84 m)	176 lb (80 kg)	30 5/8 in (0.78 m)	9 1/8 in (0.23 m)	6 ft 2 5/8 in (1.90 m)	4.52 s	1.59 s	2.62 s	31.0 in (0.79 m)	10 ft 2 in (3.10 m)
All values from NFL Combine/Pro Day

=== Philadelphia Eagles ===
After going unselected in the 2022 NFL draft, Goodrich was signed by the Philadelphia Eagles as an undrafted free agent on April 30. He was waived on August 30, 2022, and signed to the practice squad the next day. On February 15, 2023, Goodrich signed a reserve/future contract with the Eagles.

On October 18, 2023, Goodrich was waived by the Eagles and re-signed to the practice squad. He signed a reserve/future contract on January 18, 2024. Goodrich was waived on July 30.

=== New York Giants ===
On July 31, 2024, Goodrich was claimed off waivers by the New York Giants. He was waived/injured on August 27.

=== Birmingham Stallions (first stint) ===
On February 7, 2025, Goodrich signed with the Birmingham Stallions of the United Football League (UFL).

=== Denver Broncos ===
On June 18, 2025, Goodrich was signed by the Denver Broncos following the conclusion of the 2025 UFL season. On August 1, he was waived by the Broncos.

=== New York Jets ===
On August 2, 2025, Goodrich was claimed off waivers by the New York Jets. He was waived by the Jets on August 23.

=== Birmingham Stallions (second stint) ===
Goodrich returned to the Stallions ahead of the 2026 UFL season.

=== Tennessee Titans ===
On August 1, 2026, Goodrich signed with the Tennessee Titans. He was waived by the Titans as a part of final roster cuts on August 30, but re–signed with the team's practice squad the next day. On September 1, Goodrich was released from the practice squad.
