= 2018 Orange Bowl =

College Football Playoff Semifinal bowl game

2018 Capital One Orange Bowl
- College Football Playoff Semifinal; 85th Orange Bowl
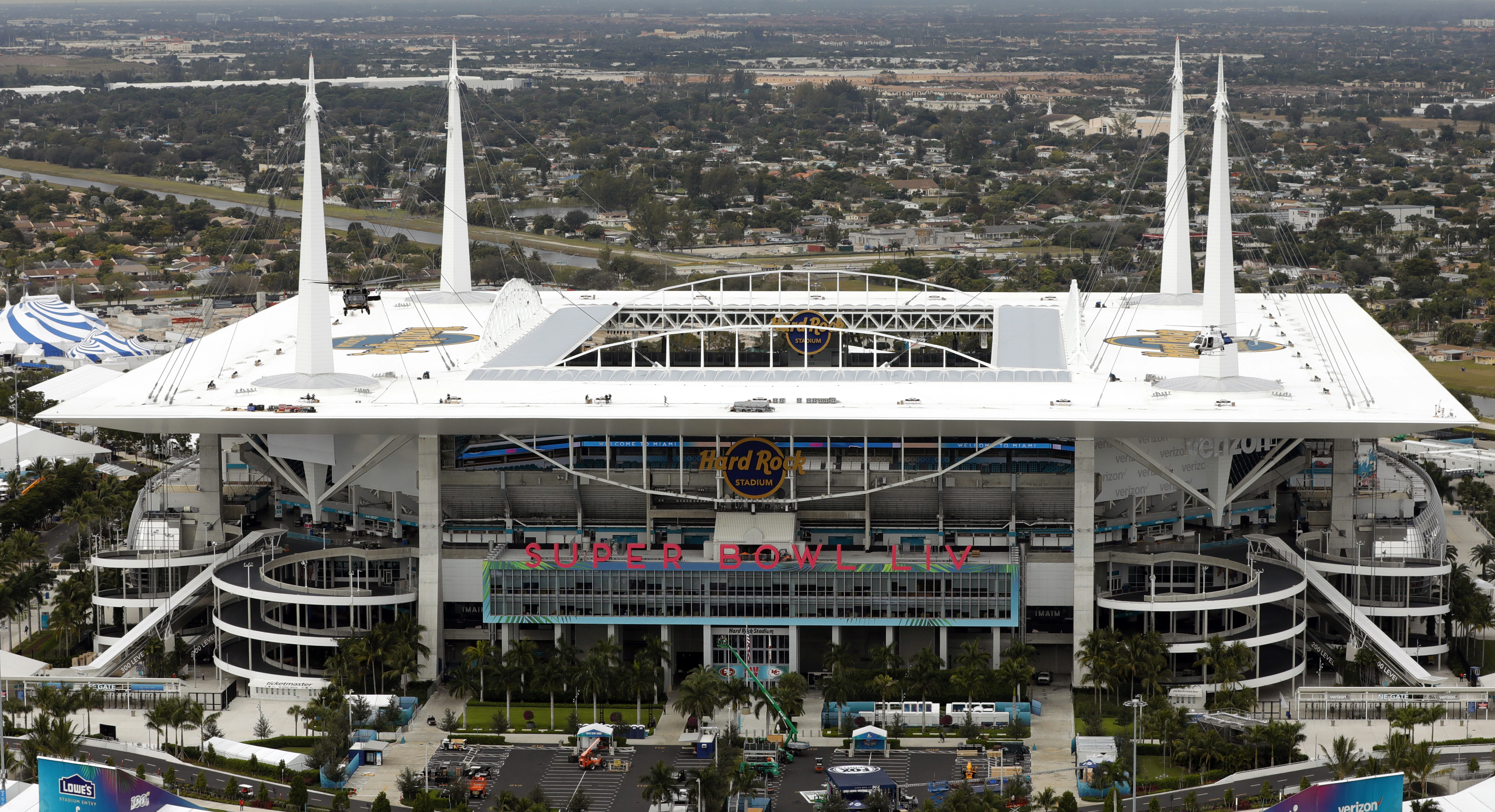
- Hard Rock Stadium in Miami Gardens, Florida, hosted the Orange Bowl.
Oklahoma Sooners	Alabama Crimson Tide
(12–1)	(13–0)
Big 12	SEC
34	45
Head coach: Lincoln Riley	Head coach: Nick Saban
AP / Coaches / CFP; 4 / 4 / 4	AP / Coaches / CFP; 1 / 1 / 1
	1	2	3	4	Total
Oklahoma	0	10	10	14	34
Alabama	21	10	0	14	45
- Date: December 29, 2018
- Season: 2018
- Stadium: Hard Rock Stadium
- Location: Miami Gardens, Florida
- MVP: Tua Tagovailoa (QB, Alabama); Xavier McKinney (S, Alabama)
- Favorite: Alabama by 14½ (80½)
- National anthem: Nicole Henry
- Referee: Duane Heydt (ACC)
- Attendance: 66,203

United States TV coverage
- Network: ESPN and ESPN Radio
- Announcers: Chris Fowler (play-by-play); Kirk Herbstreit (analyst); Maria Taylor and Laura Rutledge (sideline) (ESPN); Steve Levy, Brian Griese and Todd McShay (ESPN Radio)
- Nielsen ratings: 10.4 (19 million viewers)

International TV coverage
- Network: ESPN Deportes; ESPN Deportes Radio
- Announcers: Kenneth Garay; Sebastian Martinez-Christensen

The 2018 Orange Bowl was a college football bowl game played on Saturday, December 29, 2018, at Hard Rock Stadium in Miami. The 85th edition of the Orange Bowl was one of two College Football Playoff semifinal games, the game featured two of the four teams selected by the College Football Playoff Selection Committee—Alabama from the SEC, and Oklahoma from the Big 12 Conference. Alabama took off with a 28-0 lead in the early 2nd quarter and never looked back, winning 45–34. They advanced to face the winner of the Cotton Bowl (Clemson) in the 2019 College Football Playoff National Championship. It was one of the 2018–19 bowl games concluding the 2018 FBS football season. Sponsored by the Capital One Financial Corporation, the game was officially known as the College Football Playoff Semifinal at the Capital One Orange Bowl.

== Teams ==
The game featured top-ranked Alabama of the Southeastern Conference (SEC) against fourth-ranked Oklahoma of the Big 12 Conference. The programs had previously met five times, with Oklahoma leading the series, 3–1–1. They first met in the 1963 Orange Bowl, won by Alabama, 17–0. Their most recent meeting was in the 2014 Sugar Bowl, a 45–31 Oklahoma victory.

=== Alabama Crimson Tide ===
Alabama defeated Georgia in the 2018 SEC Championship Game on December 1, then received their bid to the Orange Bowl with the release of final CFP rankings on December 2. The Crimson Tide entered the bowl with a 13–0 record (8–0 in conference). On December 25, it was announced that three Alabama players, including starting offensive lineman Deonte Brown, would not play in the game due to an unspecified violation of team rules.

=== Oklahoma Sooners ===
Oklahoma defeated Texas in the 2018 Big 12 Championship Game on December 1, then received their bid to the Orange Bowl with the release of final CFP rankings on December 2. The Sooners entered the bowl with a 12–1 record (8–1 in conference); their only loss was to Texas, by a score of 45–48 in the 113th Red River Showdown on October 6.

== Game summary ==
=== Scoring summary ===
Scoring summary

Quarter	Time	Drive			Team	Scoring information	Score	
Quarter	Time	Plays	Yards	TOP	Team	Scoring information	OKLA	BAMA
1	11:54	7	75	3:06	BAMA	Damien Harris 1-yard touchdown run, Joseph Bulovas kick good	0	7
1	5:54	8	55	3:57	BAMA	Henry Ruggs III 10-yard touchdown reception from Tua Tagovailoa, Joseph Bulovas kick good	0	14
1	1:33	5	61	2:35	BAMA	Damien Harris 1-yard touchdown run, Joseph Bulovas kick good	0	21
2	13:01	5	48	2:04	BAMA	Josh Jacobs 27-yard touchdown reception from Tua Tagovailoa, Joseph Bulovas kick good	0	28
2	11:48	4	75	1:13	OKLA	Trey Sermon 2-yard touchdown run, Austin Seibert kick good	7	28
2	7:30	10	41	3:14	OKLA	26-yard field goal by Austin Seibert	10	28
2	0:25	12	55	7:05	BAMA	38-yard field goal by Joseph Bulovas	10	31
3	9:42	14	66	5:18	OKLA	26-yard field goal by Austin Seibert	13	31
3	3:03	6	75	2:03	OKLA	Charleston Rambo 49-yard touchdown reception from Kyler Murray, Austin Seibert kick good	20	31
4	13:08	9	75	4:55	BAMA	DeVonta Smith 10-yard touchdown reception from Tua Tagovailoa, Joseph Bulovas kick good	20	38
4	8:31	14	80	4:37	OKLA	CeeDee Lamb 10-yard touchdown reception from Kyler Murray, Austin Seibert kick good	27	38
4	6:08	5	46	2:23	BAMA	Jerry Jeudy 13-yard touchdown reception from Tua Tagovailoa, Joseph Bulovas kick good	27	45
4	4:23	6	74	1:45	OKLA	Kyler Murray 8-yard touchdown run, Austin Seibert kick good	34	45
"TOP" = time of possession. For other American football terms, see Glossary of American football.							34	45

=== Statistics ===
	1	2	3	4	Total
No. 4 Sooners	0	10	10	14	34
No. 1 Crimson Tide	21	10	0	14	45

Statistics	OKLA	BAMA
First downs	26	28
Plays–yards	69–471	70–528
Rushes–yards	32–163	42–200
Passing yards	308	328
Passing: comp–att–int	19–37–0	25–28–0
Time of possession	23:52	36:08

Team	Category	Player	Statistics
Oklahoma	Passing	Kyler Murray	19/37, 308 yds, 2 TD
Oklahoma	Rushing	Kyler Murray	17 car, 109 yds, 1 TD
Oklahoma	Receiving	CeeDee Lamb	8 rec, 109 yds, 1 TD
Alabama	Passing	Tua Tagovailoa	24/27, 318 yds, 4 TD
Alabama	Rushing	Josh Jacobs	15 car, 98 yds
Alabama	Receiving	DeVonta Smith	6 rec, 104 yds, 1 TD
