= 2018 ACC Championship Game =

2018 Dr Pepper ACC Championship Game
- Conference Championship
Clemson Tigers	Pittsburgh Panthers
(12–0)	(7–5)
42	10
Head coach: Dabo Swinney	Head coach: Pat Narduzzi
AP / Coaches / CFP; 2 / 2 / 2
	1	2	3	4	Total
Clemson	14	14	0	14	42
Pittsburgh	3	7	0	0	10
- Date: December 1, 2018
- Season: 2018
- Stadium: Bank of America Stadium
- Location: Charlotte, North Carolina
- MVP: Travis Etienne (RB, Clemson)
- Favorite: Clemson by 28
- Referee: Jeff Heaser
- Attendance: 67,784

United States TV coverage
- Network: ABC/ESPN Radio
- Announcers: ABC: Chris Fowler (Play-By-Play); Kirk Herbstreit (Analyst); Maria Taylor (Sidelines)

2018 Atlantic Coast Conference football standings
	Conf.			Overall
Team	W		L	W		L
Atlantic Division
No. 1 Clemson x$#^	8	–	0	15	–	0
No. 15 Syracuse	6	–	2	10	–	3
NC State	5	–	3	9	–	4
Boston College	4	–	4	7	–	5
Wake Forest	3	–	5	7	–	6
Florida State	3	–	5	5	–	7
Louisville	0	–	8	2	–	10
Coastal Division
Pittsburgh x	6	–	2	7	–	7
Georgia Tech	5	–	3	7	–	6
Miami (FL)	4	–	4	7	–	6
Virginia	4	–	4	8	–	5
Virginia Tech	4	–	4	6	–	7
Duke	3	–	5	8	–	5
North Carolina	1	–	7	2	–	9
Championship: Clemson 42, Pittsburgh 10
# – College Football Playoff champion; ^ – College Football Playoff participant; $ – Conference champion; x – Division champion/co-champions; Rankings from AP Poll

The 2018 ACC Championship Game was played on December 1, 2018. It was the 14th annual ACC Championship Game. The Clemson Tigers and the Pittsburgh Panthers played to determine the 2018 champion of the Atlantic Coast Conference. The game was held at Bank of America Stadium in Charlotte, North Carolina. Clemson emerged victorious and became the 2018 ACC champions, beating Pitt 42–10.

== History ==
The 2018 Championship Game was the 14th in the Atlantic Coast Conference's 66-year history. Last season, the ACC Championship Game featured the Clemson Tigers, champions of the Atlantic Division, and the Miami Hurricanes, champions of the Coastal Division. Clemson won the game 38–3 and went on to the 2017 College Football Playoff.

== Teams ==
=== Clemson ===
The Clemson Tigers finished the season with a 12–0 undefeated record. This is the Tigers' fourth straight appearance in the championship game. They have won the previous three championship games. During the season, they defeated Georgia Tech, Syracuse, Wake Forest, NC State, Florida State, Louisville, Boston College and Duke in conference play. Their season was also highlighted by 2 wins over SEC teams (Texas A&M and South Carolina). The Tigers come into the game ranked #2 in both the AP and Coaches poll.

=== Pittsburgh ===
The Pittsburgh Panthers finished the season with a 7–5 overall record and a 6–2 record in ACC play. This is Pitt's first appearance in the championship game. During the regular season, they defeated Georgia Tech, Syracuse, Duke, Virginia, Virginia Tech, and Wake Forest in conference play. They lost to North Carolina and Miami (FL) in conference play. The Panthers come into the game unranked in both the AP and Coaches poll.

=== Clemson vs. Pittsburgh series history ===
This matchup was the third all-time meeting between the Tigers and Panthers. They last played on November 12, 2016, when Pitt upset No. 2 Clemson at Memorial Stadium, kicking the winning field goal with 6 seconds remaining to defeat Clemson by a final score of 43–42. The win brought Clemson its first (and ultimately, only) loss of the season, as the Tigers went on to win the College Football Playoff National Championship.

== Game summary ==
=== Scoring summary ===
Scoring summary

Quarter	Time	Drive			Team	Scoring information	Score	
Quarter	Time	Plays	Yards	TOP	Team	Scoring information	Clemson	Pittsburgh
1	14:47	1	75	0:13	Clemson	Travis Etienne 75-yard touchdown run, Greg Huegel kick good	7	0
1	09:29	1	3	0:05	Clemson	Travis Etienne 3-yard touchdown run, Greg Huegel kick good	14	0
1	01:46	9	62	4:22	Pittsburgh	37-yard field goal by Alex Kessman	14	3
2	07:56	6	39	3:08	Pittsburgh	Qadree Ollison 1-yard touchdown run, Alex Kessman kick good	14	10
2	04:57	7	75	2:59	Clemson	Tee Higgins 5-yard touchdown reception from Trevor Lawrence, Greg Huegel kick good	21	10
2	00:25	1	10	0:04	Clemson	Tee Higgins 10-yard touchdown reception from Trevor Lawrence, Greg Huegel kick good	28	10
4	14:27	5	69	1:32	Clemson	Adam Choice 1-yard touchdown run, Greg Huegel kick good	35	10
4	03:17	5	65	2:45	Clemson	Lyn-J Dixon 4-yard touchdown run, Greg Huegel kick good	42	10
"TOP" = time of possession. For other American football terms, see Glossary of American football.							42	10

=== Statistics ===
	1	2	3	4	Total
No. 2 Tigers	14	14	0	14	42
Panthers	3	7	0	0	10

Statistics	CLEM	PITT
First downs	13	11
Plays–yards	59–419	64–200
Rushes–yards	35–301	48–192
Passing yards	118	8
Passing: Comp–Att–Int	12–24–0	4–16–1
Time of possession	25:16	34:44

Team	Category	Player	Statistics
Clemson	Passing	Trevor Lawrence	12–24, 118 yards, 2 TDs
Clemson	Rushing	Travis Etienne	12 carries, 156 yards, 2 TDs
Clemson	Receiving	Tee Higgins	3 receptions, 36 yards, 2 TDs
Pittsburgh	Passing	Kenny Pickett	4–16, 8 yards, 1 INT
Pittsburgh	Rushing	Darrin Hall	14 carries, 86 yards
Pittsburgh	Receiving	Rafael Araujo-Lopes	2 receptions, 10 yards
