= Justyn Ross =

American football player (born 1999)

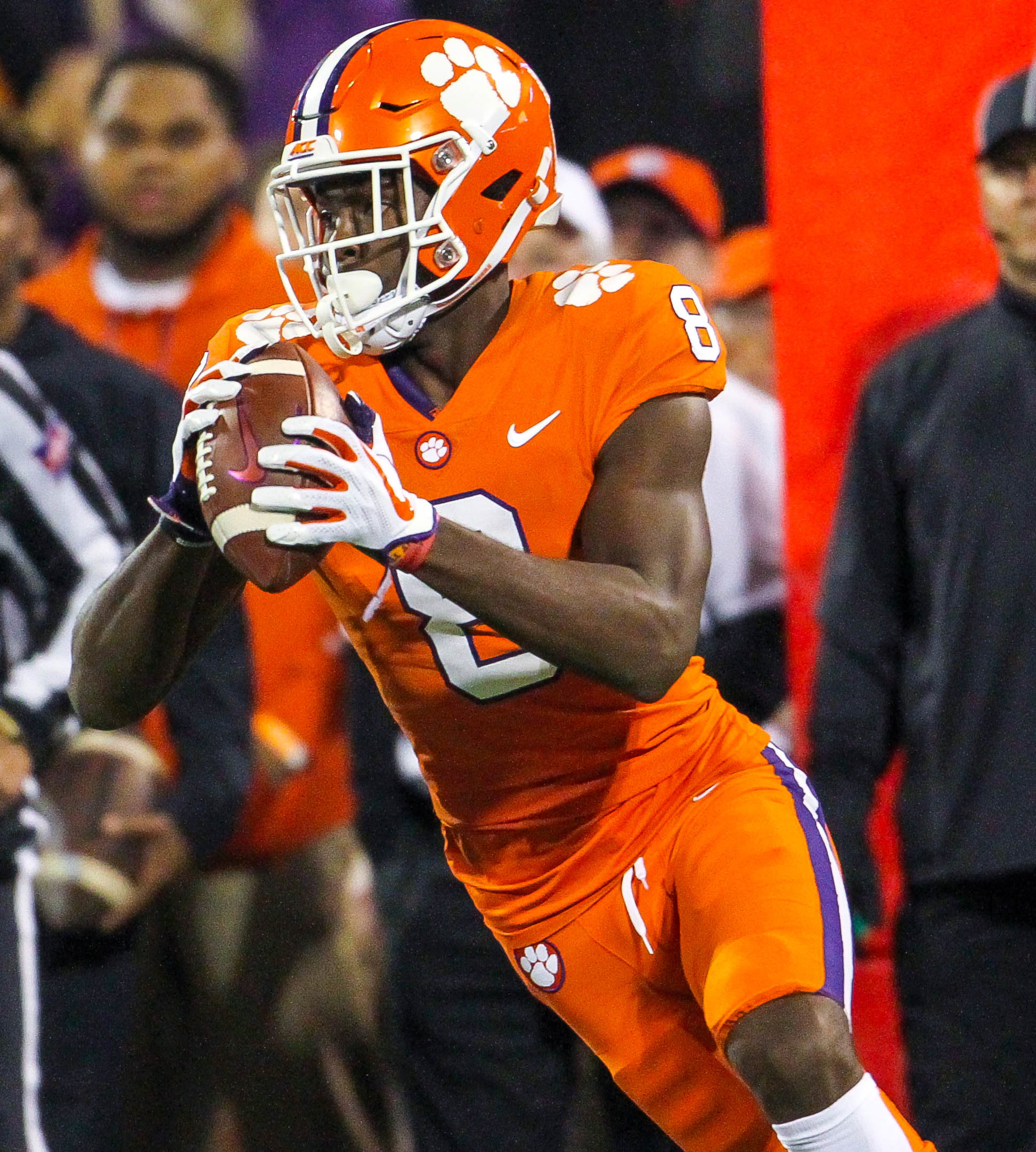
- Ross at Clemson in 2018

No. 13 – Rhode Island Breakers
- Position: Wide receiver
- Roster status: Active

Personal information
- Born: December 15, 1999 (age 26); Phenix City, Alabama, U.S.
- Listed height: 6 ft 4 in (1.93 m)
- Listed weight: 210 lb (95 kg)

Career information
- High school: Central (Phenix City, Alabama)
- College: Clemson (2018–2021)
- NFL draft: 2022: undrafted

Career history
- Kansas City Chiefs (2022–2024); Birmingham Stallions (2026); Rhode Island Breakers (2027–present)

Awards and highlights
- 2× Super Bowl champion (LVII, LVIII); CFP national champion (2018); Brian Piccolo Award (2021)

Career NFL statistics
- Receptions: 6
- Receiving yards: 53
- Stats at Pro Football Reference

Justyn Ross (born December 15, 1999) is an American professional football wide receiver for the Rhode Island Breakers of the United Football League (UFL). He played college football for the Clemson Tigers.

== Early life ==
Ross attended Central High School in Phenix City, Alabama. As a senior, he had 37 receptions for 730 yards and 13 touchdowns. Ross was a four-star recruit ranked as the number 45 national recruit and the number 7 wide receiver in the nation receiving offers from several Division I colleges such as Alabama, Clemson, Auburn, and Duke. He committed to Clemson University to play college football.

== College career ==
As a freshman at Clemson in 2018, Ross had 46 receptions for 1,000 yards and nine touchdowns. In the 2019 College Football Playoff National Championship against Alabama he had six receptions for 153 yards and a touchdown. As a sophomore in 2019, Ross finished with 865 receiving yards on 66 receptions with eight touchdowns. Ross missed the entire 2020 season due to a congenital fusion condition of his neck and spine stemming from Klippel–Feil syndrome which required surgery. He was granted a medical redshirt after his surgery. As a redshirt junior in 2021, Ross finished with a team high of 524 receiving yards on 47 receptions and three touchdowns in ten games. Ross finished his career at Clemson ranking 5th all-time in career receiving touchdowns with 20. On January 6, 2022, Ross announced that he would forgo his senior year, and enter the NFL Draft.

=== Statistics ===
| Season | Team | Rec | Yds | Avg | TD |
|---|---|---|---|---|---|
| 2018 | Clemson | 46 | 1,000 | 21.7 | 9 |
| 2019 | Clemson | 66 | 865 | 13.1 | 8 |
| 2020 | Clemson | Did not play | | | |
| 2021 | Clemson | 47 | 524 | 11.1 | 3 |
| Career | | 159 | 2,389 | 15.0 | 20 |

== Professional career ==
Pre-draft measurables
| Height | Weight | Arm length | Hand span | Wingspan | 40-yard dash | 10-yard split | 20-yard split | Vertical jump | Broad jump | Bench press |
|---|---|---|---|---|---|---|---|---|---|---|
| 6 ft 3 5/8 in (1.92 m) | 205 lb (93 kg) | 32 1/8 in (0.82 m) | 9 5/8 in (0.24 m) | 6 ft 5 7/8 in (1.98 m) | 4.64 s | 1.76 s | 2.72 s | 31.5 in (0.80 m) | 9 ft 8 in (2.95 m) | 11 reps |
All values from NFL Combine/Pro Day

Ross was not selected during the 2022 NFL draft. He signed with the Kansas City Chiefs as an undrafted free agent on May 7, 2022. On July 25, 2022, Ross was placed on injured reserve due to an offseason foot surgery that caused him to miss the entire season. Ross earned his first Super Bowl championship when the Chiefs defeated the Philadelphia Eagles in Super Bowl LVII. Ross was placed in the Commissioner's Exempt List on October 27, 2023, due to his arrest earlier in the week. Ross was later suspended from Week 8 until Week 14. Ross won a second Super Bowl title when the Chiefs defeated the San Francisco 49ers in Super Bowl LVIII.

Ross was waived by the Chiefs on August 27, 2024, and re-signed to the practice squad. He signed a reserve/future contract on February 11, 2025.

On July 16, 2025, Ross was waived by the Chiefs.

=== Birmingham Stallions ===
On January 14, 2026, Ross was selected by the Birmingham Stallions of the United Football League (UFL).

== Legal troubles ==
On October 23, 2023, Ross was arrested in Shawnee, Kansas for domestic battery and criminal property damage of less than $1,000.
