= Tre Lamar =

American football player (born 1997)

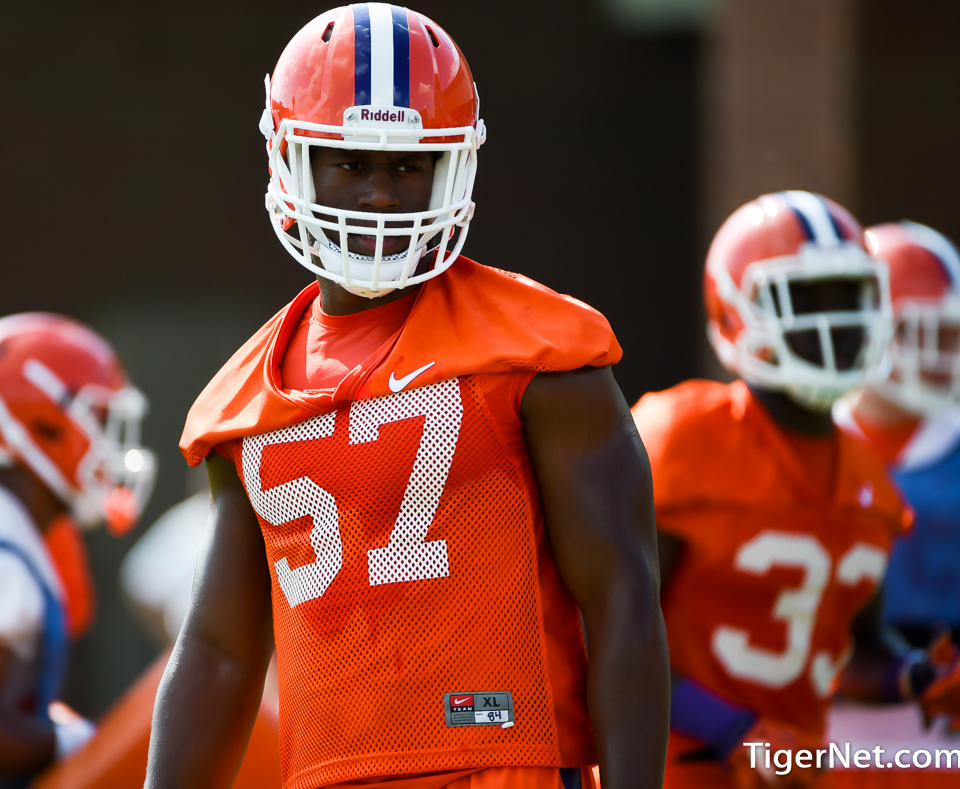
- Lamar with Clemson in 2016

No. 59
- Position: Linebacker

Personal information
- Born: October 8, 1997 (age 29); Roswell, Georgia, U.S.
- Listed height: 6 ft 4 in (1.93 m)
- Listed weight: 250 lb (113 kg)

Career information
- High school: Roswell (GA)
- College: Clemson
- NFL draft: 2019: undrafted

Career history
- Detroit Lions (2019)

Awards and highlights
- CFP national champion (2018); Second team All-ACC (2018)
- Stats at Pro Football Reference

Tre Lamar (born October 8, 1997) is an American former football linebacker. He played college football at Clemson.

== College career ==
As a 4-star high school recruit, Lamar signed with Clemson on national signing day. As a freshman, Lamar played in all 15 games spending some time on special teams. During his sophomore year, Lamar played in 10 games starting 8 as a linebacker. Due to a shoulder injury he received against Florida State on November 11, Lamar missed the last 5 games of the 2017 season, including the 2017 ACC Championship and the 2018 Sugar Bowl. Going into Spring training, it was reported that Lamar was healthy again. Despite this, Lamar was listed as the backup middle linebacker going into 2018 spring training behind Kendall Joseph. It was later announced by defensive coordinator Brent Venables that this was a mistake, and he meant to indicate that Lamar and Joseph were co-starters. During the 2018 season, Lamar was named a semi-finalist for the Butkus Award. On January 9, 2019, Lamar announced that he would forgo his final year of eligibility and declare for the 2019 NFL draft.

== Professional career ==
Lamar signed with the Detroit Lions as an undrafted free agent following the 2019 draft. He was waived/injured on August 11, 2019, and placed on injured reserve the next day. He was waived from injured reserve on September 10.

== Personal life ==
Lamar's parents are George, Jr. and Ilysse Lamar. His sister, Chesslyn Lamar, played lacrosse for Kennesaw State.
