= Austin Bryant =

American football player (born 1996)

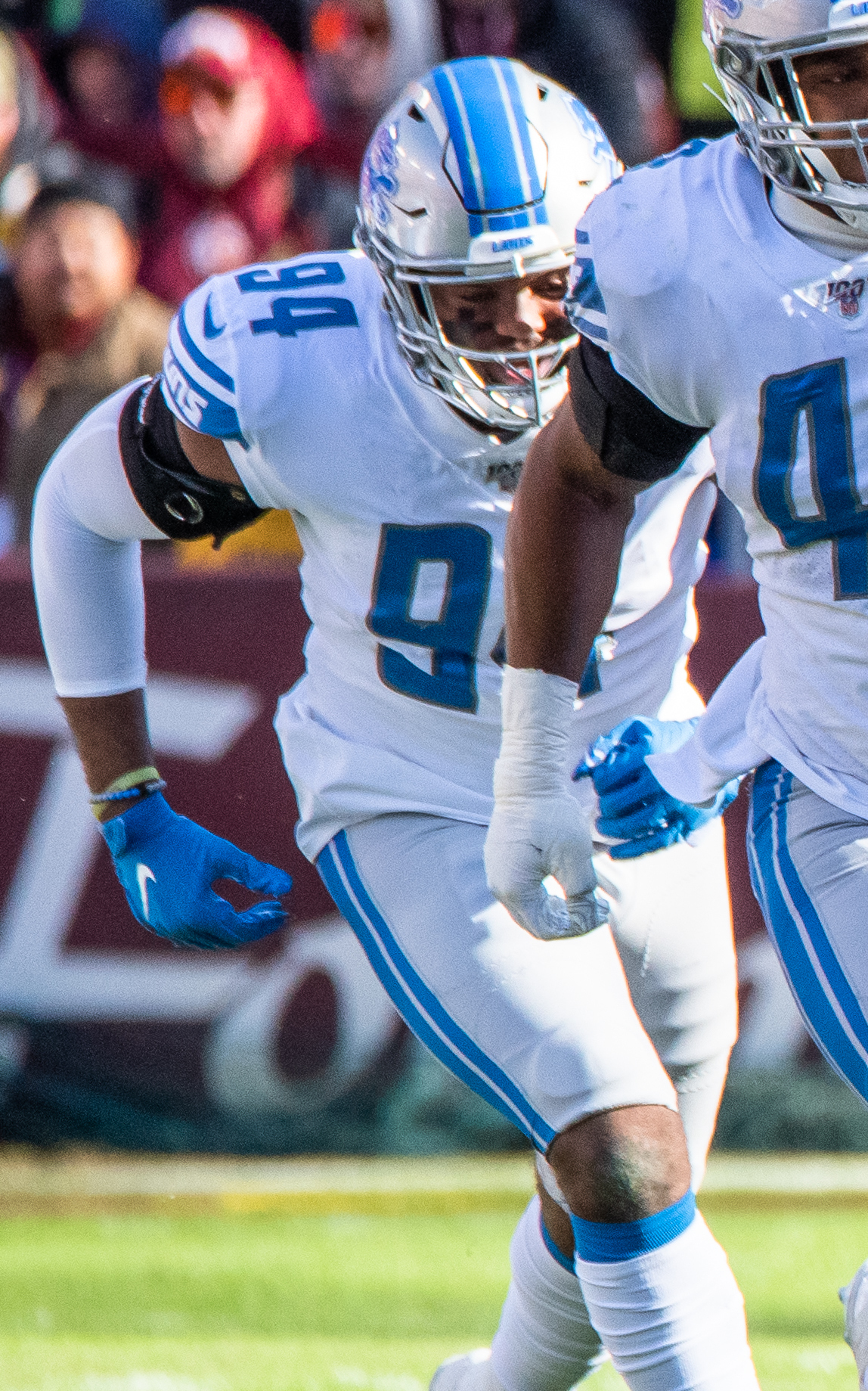
- Bryant with the Detroit Lions in 2019

No. 94, 2, 56
- Position: Defensive end

Personal information
- Born: November 12, 1996 (age 29); Pavo, Georgia, U.S.
- Listed height: 6 ft 5 in (1.96 m)
- Listed weight: 250 lb (113 kg)

Career information
- High school: Thomas County Central (Thomasville, Georgia)
- College: Clemson (2015–2018)
- NFL draft: 2019: 4th round, 117th overall pick

Career history
- Detroit Lions (2019–2022); San Francisco 49ers (2023); Minnesota Vikings (2023)*; San Francisco 49ers (2023)*
- * Offseason or practice squad member only

Awards and highlights
- 2× CFP national champion (2016, 2018); First-team All-American (2017); Second-team All-ACC (2017); Third-team All-ACC (2018)

Career NFL statistics
- Total tackles: 66
- Sacks: 4.5
- Pass deflections: 1
- Stats at Pro Football Reference

Austin Bryant (born November 12, 1996) is an American former professional football player who was a defensive end in the National Football League (NFL). He played college football for the Clemson Tigers.

== Early life ==
Bryant attended Thomas County Central High School in Thomasville, Georgia. He committed to Clemson University to play college football.

== College career ==
As a true freshman at Clemson in 2015, Bryant played in 13 games, recording 22 tackles and 1.5 sacks. He missed the first six games of his sophomore season in 2016, due to a foot injury. He returned from the injury and recorded 12 tackles and 2.5 sacks. Bryant became a starter for the first time his junior year in 2017.

== Professional career ==
Pre-draft measurables
Height	Weight	Arm length	Hand span
6 ft 3 7/8 in (1.93 m)	271 lb (123 kg)	34 5/8 in (0.88 m)	9 5/8 in (0.24 m)
All values are from NFL Scouting Combine

=== Detroit Lions ===
Bryant was selected by the Detroit Lions in the fourth round (117th overall) of the 2019 NFL draft. He was placed on injured reserve on September 2, 2019. He was designated for return on October 30, 2019, and began practicing with the team again. He was activated on November 20, 2019.

Bryant was placed on the active/physically unable to perform list (PUP) at the start of training camp on August 2, 2020. He was placed on reserve/PUP on September 5, 2020. He was activated on November 7, 2020.

=== San Francisco 49ers (first stint) ===
On March 23, 2023, Bryant signed a one-year contract with the San Francisco 49ers. He was released on September 8, 2023, and re-signed to the practice squad. Bryant was released on November 15.

=== Minnesota Vikings ===
On November 21, 2023, Bryant was signed to the Minnesota Vikings practice squad. He was not signed to a reserve/future contract and became a free agent at the end of the season.

=== San Francisco 49ers (second stint) ===
On January 16, 2024, Bryant was signed to the 49ers' practice squad. He re-signed on February 14, 2024. He was placed on injured reserve on August 9, then released a week later.
