= Rafael Araujo-Lopes =

American gridiron football player (born 1996)

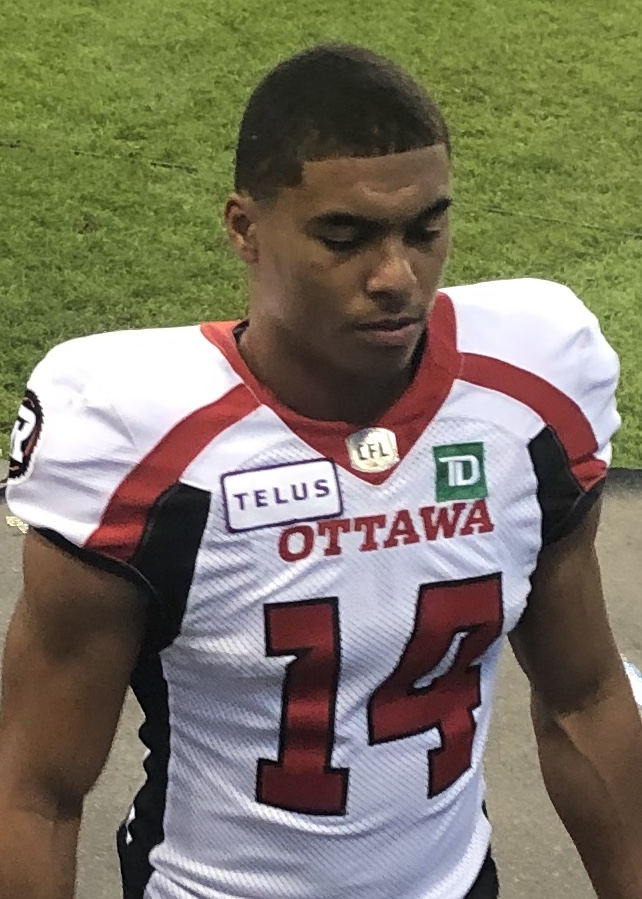
- Araujo-Lopes with the Ottawa Redblacks in 2019

No. 14
- Position: Wide receiver

Personal information
- Born: April 7, 1996 (age 30); Kissimmee, Florida
- Listed height: 5 ft 9 in (1.75 m)
- Listed weight: 190 lb (86 kg)

Career information
- High school: Winter Park High School
- College: Reedley (2014); Pittsburgh (2015–2018)
- NFL draft: 2019: undrafted

Career history
- Ottawa Redblacks (2019–2021)

Career CFL statistics
- Receptions: 6
- Receiving yards: 57
- Receiving touchdowns: 0
- Stats at CFL.ca

Rafael Luiz Araujo-Lopes (born April 7, 1996) is an American former professional football wide receiver who played for the Ottawa Redblacks of the Canadian Football League (CFL). He played college football at Pittsburgh.

== College career ==
After attending Winter Park High School, Araujo-Lopes played college football for Reedley College in 2014 and for Pittsburgh from 2015 to 2018.

== Professional career ==
In April 2019, Araujo-Lopes was invited to rookie minicamp with the Miami Dolphins on a tryout basis, but was not signed.

In July 2019, Araujo-Lopes signed with the Ottawa Redblacks. He made his professional debut on August 8, 2019 against the Edmonton Eskimos where he recorded six receptions for 57 yards. He played in two regular season games in 2019. He re-signed with the Redblacks on January 12, 2021.

== Post-playing career ==
Following his football career, he became a sales representative for Stryker Corporation.
