= 2015 Clemson Tigers football team =

American college football season

2015 Clemson Tigers football

ACC champion ACC Atlantic Division champion Orange Bowl champion

ACC Championship, W 45–37 vs. North Carolina

Orange Bowl (CFP Semifinal), W 37–17 vs. Oklahoma CFP National Championship, L 40–45 vs. Alabama
- Conference: Atlantic Coast Conference
- Atlantic Division

Ranking
- Coaches: No. 2
- AP: No. 2
- Record: 14–1 (8–0 ACC)
- Head coach: Dabo Swinney (7th full, 8th overall season)
- Co-offensive coordinators: Tony Elliott (1st season); Jeff Scott (1st season)
- Offensive scheme: Spread
- Defensive coordinator: Brent Venables (4th season)
- Base defense: 4–3
- Captains: Travis Blanks; B. J. Goodson; Eric MacLain; Charone Peake; D. J. Reader; Stanton Seckinger
- Home stadium: Memorial Stadium

2015 Atlantic Coast Conference football standings
	Conf.			Overall
Team	W		L	W		L
Atlantic Division
No. 2 Clemson x$^	8	–	0	14	–	1
No. 14 Florida State	6	–	2	10	–	3
Louisville	5	–	3	8	–	5
NC State	3	–	5	7	–	6
Syracuse	2	–	6	4	–	8
Wake Forest	1	–	7	3	–	9
Boston College	0	–	8	3	–	9
Coastal Division
No. 15 North Carolina x	8	–	0	11	–	3
Pittsburgh	6	–	2	8	–	5
Miami (FL)	5	–	3	8	–	5
Duke	4	–	4	8	–	5
Virginia Tech	4	–	4	7	–	6
Virginia	3	–	5	4	–	8
Georgia Tech	1	–	7	3	–	9
Championship: Clemson 45, North Carolina 37
^ – College Football Playoff participant; $ – Conference champion; x – Division champion/co-champions; Rankings from AP Poll

The 2015 Clemson Tigers football team represented Clemson University in the 2015 NCAA Division I FBS football season. The Tigers were led by head coach Dabo Swinney in his seventh full year and eighth overall since taking over midway through 2008 season. They played their home games at Memorial Stadium, also known as "Death Valley." Clemson competed in the Atlantic Division of the Atlantic Coast Conference. On December 5, 2015, the Tigers won the 2015 ACC Championship Game by defeating the North Carolina Tar Heels, 45–37, capping their first undefeated regular season since winning the national title in 1981. Ranked No. 1 throughout the College Football Playoff (CFP) rankings, Clemson defeated the No. 4 Oklahoma Sooners, 37–17, in the 2015 Orange Bowl to advance to the College Football Playoff National Championship. Despite the success of the season, and entering the championship game with an undefeated record (14–0), they lost to the No. 2 Alabama Crimson Tide (13–1) in the national championship, 45–40. Both Clemson and Alabama finished the season 14–1.

== Schedule ==
Clemson announced their 2015 football schedule on January 29, 2015. The 2015 schedule consisted of seven home and five away games in the regular season. The Tigers hosted ACC foes Boston College, Florida State, Georgia Tech, and Wake Forest, and travelled to Louisville, Miami, NC State, and Syracuse. Clemson hosted #4 seed Oklahoma in the Orange Bowl in the first round of the 2015-16 College Football Playoff. The Tigers then hosted #2 seed Alabama in the 2016 College Football Playoff National Championship in University of Phoenix Stadium.

Date	Time	Opponent	Rank	Site	TV	Result	Attendance
September 5	12:30 p.m.	Wofford*	No. 12	Memorial Stadium; Clemson, SC	ACCN	W 49–10	81,345
September 12	12:30 p.m.	Appalachian State*	No. 12	Memorial Stadium; Clemson, SC	ESPN3	W 41–10	81,467
September 17	7:30 p.m.	at Louisville	No. 11	Papa John's Cardinal Stadium; Louisville, KY	ESPN	W 20–17	55,396
October 3	8:00 p.m.	No. 6 Notre Dame*	No. 12	Memorial Stadium; Clemson, SC (College GameDay)	ABC	W 24–22	82,415
October 10	3:30 p.m.	Georgia Tech	No. 6	Memorial Stadium; Clemson, SC (rivalry)	ABC/ESPN2	W 43–24	80,983
October 17	7:00 p.m.	Boston College^{†}	No. 5	Memorial Stadium; Clemson, SC (O'Rourke–McFadden Trophy)	ESPNU	W 34–17	81,416
October 24	Noon	at Miami (FL)	No. 6	Sun Life Stadium; Miami Gardens, FL	ABC	W 58–0	45,211
October 31	3:30 p.m.	at NC State	No. 3	Carter–Finley Stadium; Raleigh, NC (Textile Bowl)	ABC/ESPN2	W 56–41	57,600
November 7	3:30 p.m.	No. 16 Florida State	No. 1	Memorial Stadium; Clemson, SC (rivalry)	ABC	W 23–13	83,099
November 14	3:30 p.m.	at Syracuse	No. 1	Carrier Dome; Syracuse, NY	ABC/ESPN2	W 37–27	36,736
November 21	3:30 p.m.	Wake Forest	No. 1	Memorial Stadium; Clemson, SC	ESPN2	W 33–13	81,577
November 28	Noon	at South Carolina*	No. 1	Williams-Brice Stadium; Columbia, SC (Palmetto Bowl)	ESPN	W 37–32	81,409
December 5	8:00 p.m.	vs. No. 10 North Carolina	No. 1	Bank of America Stadium; Charlotte, NC (ACC Championship Game)	ABC	W 45–37	74,514
December 31	4:00 p.m.	vs. No. 4 Oklahoma*	No. 1	Sun Life Stadium; Miami Gardens, FL (Orange Bowl–CFP Semifinal)	ESPN	W 37–17	67,615
January 11, 2016	8:30 p.m.	vs. No. 2 Alabama*	No. 1	University of Phoenix Stadium; Glendale, AZ (CFP National Championship / rivalry / SEC Nation)	ESPN	L 40–45	75,765
*Non-conference game; ^{†}Homecoming; Rankings from AP Poll and CFP Rankings after November 3 released prior to game; All times are in Eastern time

Schedule source:

== Roster ==
2015 Clemson Tigers football team roster
Players
Coaches
Offense

Pos.	#	Name	Class
WR	1	Trevion Thompson	Fr
QB	2	Kelly Bryant	Fr
WR	3	Artavis Scott	So
QB	4	Deshaun Watson	So
WR	5	Germone Hopper	Jr
WR	7	Mike Williams (injured)	Jr
WR	8	Deon Cain	Fr
RB	9	Wayne Gallman	So
QB	10	Tucker Israel	Fr
WR	11	Shadell Bell	Fr
QB	12	Nick Schuessler	Jr
WR, P	13	Hunter Renfrow	Fr
TE	16	Jordan Leggett	Jr
QB	18	James Barnes	Fr
WR	19	Charone Peake	Sr
RB	21	C. J. Davidson	Sr
RB	22	Tyshon Dye	So
RB	24	Zac Brooks	Sr
RB	26	Adam Choice	So
RB	27	C. J. Fuller	Fr
WR	34	Ray-Ray McCloud	Fr
RB	38	Brennan Goodnature	Sr
WR	39	Jordan Bianchi	Sr
TE	44	Garrett Williams	Fr
OL	50	Justin Falcinelli	Fr
OL	51	Taylor Hearn	Fr
OL	54	Zach Riggs	So
G	55	Tyrone Crowder	So
OL	57	Jay Guillermo	Jr
OL	58	Ryan Norton	Sr
OT	61	William Cockerill	Sr
OT	63	Jake Fruhmorgen	Fr
OL	64	Pat Godfrey	Fr
OT	65	Daniel Stone	Sr
G	69	Maverick Morris	So
G	70	Seth Penner	Fr
OL	71	Noah Green	Fr
OL	72	Logan Tisch	Fr
OL	73	Joe Gore	Sr
OT	75	Mitch Hyatt	Fr
C	77	Zach Geilla	Fr
G	78	Eric Mac Lain	Sr
OL	79	Harrison Tucker	Sr
TE	80	Milan Richard	Fr
TE	81	Stanton Seckinger	Sr
WR	82	Adrien Dunn	So
TE	83	Jesse Fisher	Fr
TE	84	Cannon Smith	Fr
WR	85	Seth Ryan	So
WR	86	Ty Thomason	Fr
TE	87	D. J. Greenlee	So
WR	88	Sean Mac Lane	Jr
TE	89	Jay Jay McCullough	Jr

Defense

Pos.	#	Name	Class
S	1	Jayron Kearse	Jr
CB	2	Mackensie Alexander	So
LB	6	Dorian O'Daniel	So
LB	10	Ben Boulware	Jr
LB	11	Travis Blanks	Jr
S	12	Korrin Wiggins (injured)	Jr
CB	14	Denzel Johnson	Fr
S	15	T. J. Green	Jr
S	17	Jefferie Gibson	Fr
S	18	Jadar Johnson	Jr
S	19	Tanner Muse	Fr
CB	20	Kaleb Chalmers	Fr
CB	21	Adrian Baker	So
S	23	Van Smith	Fr
CB	24	Mark Fields	Fr
CB	25	Cordrea Tankersley	Jr
CB	29	Marcus Edmond	So
LB	30	Jalen Williams	Fr
CB	31	Ryan Carter	So
S	32	Kyle Cote	Fr
LB	33	J. D. Davis	Fr
LB	34	Kendall Joseph	Fr
LB	35	Quentin Hall	Sr
LB	37	Judah Davis	Fr
S	37	Cameron Scott	Fr
CB	38	Amir Trapp	Fr
DE	40	Jaquarius Brice	So
DT	40	Roderick Byers	Sr
LB	41	T. J. Burrell	Jr
DT	42	Christian Wilkins	Fr
LB	43	Chad Smith	Fr
LB	44	B. J. Goodson	Sr
DE	45	Chris Register	Fr
LB	46	Jarvis Magwood	Fr
DT	48	D. J. Reader	Sr
S	49	Beau Brown	Sr
DE	49	Richard Yeargin	Fr
DT	50	Jabril Robinson	Fr
LB	52	Connor Prevost	So
LB	53	Martin Aiken	Jr
DT	56	Scott Pagano	So
DE	59	Collins Mauldin	Sr
DE	60	Kelby Bevelle	So
DE	62	Kaleb Bevelle	So
DT	67	Albert Huggins	Fr
DE	85	Dane Rogers	So
DE	90	Shaq Lawson	Jr
DE	91	Austin Bryant	Fr
DE	93	Sterling Johnson	Fr
DT	94	Carlos Watkins	Jr
DT	95	Gage Cervenka	Fr
DE	98	Kevin Dodd	Jr
DE	99	Clelin Ferrell	Fr

Special teams

Pos.	#	Name	Class
P	32	Andy Teasdall	Jr
K, P	36	Ammon Lakip	Sr
K, P	39	Christian Groomes	Fr
K	47	Alex Spence	So
LS	52	Austin Spence	Fr
LS	59	Bradley Tatko	So
LS	61	David Estes	Jr
LS	76	Jim Brown	Sr
K	92	Greg Huegel	Fr
P	96	Michael Batson	Fr

Head coach

- Dabo Swinney (8th season)

Coordinators/assistant coaches

- Tony Elliott – Co-offensive coordinator / running backs
- Jeff Scott – Co-offensive coordinator / wide receivers
- Danny Pearman – Assistant Head Coach / special teams coordinator & Tight Ends
- Robbie Caldwell – Offensive linemen
- Brandon Streeter – Quarterbacks / recruiting coordinator
- Brent Venables – Defensive coordinator / Linebackers
- Marion Hobby – Co-defensive coordinator / Defensive Ends
- Mike Reed – Associate head coach / defensive backs
- Dan Brooks – Defensive tackles
- Thomas Austin – Graduate assistant
- Tyler Grisham – Graduate assistant
- DeAndre McDaniel – Graduate assistant
- Corico White – Graduate assistant
- Zac Alley– Graduate Assistant

Legend

- (C) Team captain
- (S) Suspended
- (I) Ineligible
- Injured
- Redshirt

Roster
Last update: November 22, 2015

=== Recruiting class ===
College recruiting (2015)
Name	Hometown	School	Height	Weight	Commit date
Mitch Hyatt; OT	Suwanee, Georgia	North Gwinnett H.S.	6 ft 5 in (1.96 m)	272 lb (123 kg)	—
Mitch Hyatt; OT	Recruit ratings: Scout: Rivals: 247Sports: ESPN:				
Deon Cain; WR	Tampa, Florida	Tampa Bay Tech	6 ft 1.5 in (1.87 m)	194 lb (88 kg)	—
Deon Cain; WR	Recruit ratings: Scout: Rivals: 247Sports: ESPN:				
Christian Wilkins; DT	Suffield, Connecticut	Suffield Academy	6 ft 4 in (1.93 m)	290 lb (130 kg)	—
Christian Wilkins; DT	Recruit ratings: Scout: Rivals: 247Sports: ESPN:				
Ray-Ray McCloud; ATH	Tampa, Florida	Sickles High School	5 ft 9 in (1.75 m)	175 lb (79 kg)	
Ray-Ray McCloud; ATH	Recruit ratings: Scout: Rivals: 247Sports: ESPN:				
Albert Huggins; DT	Orangeburg, South Carolina	Orangeburg-Wilkinson	6 ft 3 in (1.91 m)	283 lb (128 kg)	—
Albert Huggins; DT	Recruit ratings: Scout: Rivals: 247Sports: ESPN:				
Mark Fields; CB	Cornelius, North Carolina	William Amos Hough	5 ft 11 in (1.80 m)	190 lb (86 kg)	—
Mark Fields; CB	Recruit ratings: Scout: Rivals: 247Sports: ESPN:				
Jake Fruhmorgen; OL	Tampa, Florida	Plant H.S.	6 ft 5 in (1.96 m)	280 lb (130 kg)	-
Jake Fruhmorgen; OL	Recruit ratings: Scout: Rivals: 247Sports: ESPN:				
Clelin Ferrell; DE	Richmond, Virginia	Benedictine H.S.	6 ft 5 in (1.96 m)	225 lb (102 kg)	—
Clelin Ferrell; DE	Recruit ratings: Scout: Rivals: 247Sports: ESPN:				
Garrett Williams; TE	Orlando, Florida	The First Academy	6 ft 4 in (1.93 m)	220 lb (100 kg)	—
Garrett Williams; TE	Recruit ratings: Scout: Rivals: 247Sports: ESPN:				
Austin Bryant; DE	Thomasville, Georgia	Thomas County Central	6 ft 5 in (1.96 m)	250 lb (110 kg)	—
Austin Bryant; DE	Recruit ratings: Scout: Rivals: 247Sports: ESPN:				
Chad Smith; LB	Sterling, Virginia	Dominion	6 ft 3.5 in (1.92 m)	213 lb (97 kg)	—
Chad Smith; LB	Recruit ratings: Scout: Rivals: 247Sports: ESPN:				
Van Smith; ATH	Cornelius, North Carolina	William Amos Hough	5 ft 11 in (1.80 m)	180 lb (82 kg)	—
Van Smith; ATH	Recruit ratings: Scout: Rivals: 247Sports: ESPN:				
Sterling Johnson; DT	Clayton, North Carolina	Cleveland H.S.	6 ft 5 in (1.96 m)	281 lb (127 kg)	—
Sterling Johnson; DT	Recruit ratings: Scout: Rivals: 247Sports: ESPN:				
Noah Green; OT	Boiling Springs, South Carolina	Boiling Springs H.S.	6 ft 5 in (1.96 m)	275 lb (125 kg)	—
Noah Green; OT	Recruit ratings: Scout: Rivals: 247Sports: ESPN:				
Kelly Bryant; QB	Piedmont, South Carolina	Wren H.S.	6 ft 4 in (1.93 m)	205 lb (93 kg)	—
Kelly Bryant; QB	Recruit ratings: Scout: Rivals: 247Sports: ESPN:				
Kaleb Chalmers; CB	Greenwood, South Carolina	Greenwood H.S.	5 ft 11 in (1.80 m)	171 lb (78 kg)	—
Kaleb Chalmers; CB	Recruit ratings: Scout: Rivals: 247Sports: ESPN:				
Shadell Bell; WR	Decatur, Georgia	Columbia H.S.	6 ft 3 in (1.91 m)	190 lb (86 kg)	—
Shadell Bell; WR	Recruit ratings: Scout: Rivals: 247Sports: ESPN:				
Zach Giella; OT	Augusta, Georgia	Augusta Christian H.S.	6 ft 6 in (1.98 m)	300 lb (140 kg)	—
Zach Giella; OT	Recruit ratings: Scout: Rivals: 247Sports: ESPN:				
Tanner Muse; S	Belmont, North Carolina	South Point	6 ft 3 in (1.91 m)	207 lb (94 kg)	—
Tanner Muse; S	Recruit ratings: Scout: Rivals: 247Sports: ESPN:				
Tucker Israel; QB	Orlando, Florida	Lake Nona High School	6 ft 0.5 in (1.84 m)	200 lb (91 kg)	—
Tucker Israel; QB	Recruit ratings: Scout: Rivals: 247Sports: ESPN:				
Gage Cervenka; DT	Greenwood, South Carolina	Emerald High School	6 ft 1 in (1.85 m)	275 lb (125 kg)	—
Gage Cervenka; DT	Recruit ratings: Scout: Rivals: 247Sports: ESPN:				
LaSamuel Davis; DE	Bamberg, South Carolina	Bamberg Ehrhardt	6 ft 3 in (1.91 m)	194 lb (88 kg)	—
LaSamuel Davis; DE	Recruit ratings: Scout: Rivals: 247Sports: ESPN:				
Denzel Johnson; S	Columbia, South Carolina	AC Flora	6 ft 2 in (1.88 m)	187 lb (85 kg)	—
Denzel Johnson; S	Recruit ratings: Scout: Rivals: 247Sports: ESPN:				
Amir Trapp; CB	Central, South Carolina	D.W. Daniel H.S.	5 ft 8 in (1.73 m)	160 lb (73 kg)	—
Amir Trapp; CB	Recruit ratings: Scout: Rivals: 247Sports: ESPN:				
Overall recruit ranking: Scout: 15 Rivals: 4 247Sports: 9 ESPN: 7
‡ Refers to 40-yard dash; Note: In many cases, Scout, Rivals, 247Sports, On3, and ESPN may conflict in their listings of height, weight and 40 time.; In these cases, the average was taken. ESPN grades are on a 100-point scale.; Sources: "2015 Team Ranking". Rivals.com.

== Game summaries ==
=== Wofford ===
	1	2	3	4	Total
Terriers	0	7	3	0	10
#12 Tigers	14	21	7	7	49

=== Appalachian State ===
	1	2	3	4	Total
Mountaineers	0	0	3	7	10
#12 Tigers	3	28	7	3	41

=== Louisville ===
	1	2	3	4	Total
#11 Tigers	0	7	10	3	20
Cardinals	0	3	7	7	17

=== Notre Dame ===
#6 Notre Dame (4–0) at #11 Clemson (3–0)

Quarter	1	2	3	4	Total
Notre Dame	3	0	0	19	22
Clemson	14	0	7	3	24

at Memorial Stadium, Clemson, South Carolina

- Date: October 3
- Game time: 8:15 p.m. EST
- Game weather: Rain; 64 °F (18 °C); wind 12 mph (19 km/h) ENE
- Game attendance: 82,415
- Referee: Jeff Heaser
- TV announcers (ABC): Chris Fowler and Kirk Herbstreit
- Automated Scorebook

Game information

Notre Dame

- DeShone Kizer
  19/34, 321 Yds, 2 TD, INT
  14 Rush, 55 Yds, TD
- C.J. Prosise
  4 Rec, 100 Yds, TD

Clemson

- Deshaun Watson
  10/21, 84 Yds, 2 TD, INT
- Wayne Gallman
  23 Rush, 111 Yds
- Artavis Scott
  5 Rec, 43 Yds, TD

Scoring summary

Quarter	Time	Drive			Team	Scoring information	Score	
Quarter	Time	Plays	Yards	TOP	Team	Scoring information	ND	CLEM
1	12:19	7	64	2:46	Clemson	Leggett 6-yard touchdown reception from Watson, Huegel kick good	0	7
1	8:43	4	40	1:45	Clemson	Scott 13-yard touchdown reception from Watson, Huegel kick good	0	14
1	5:32	9	22	3:09	Notre Dame	46-yard field goal by Yoon	3	14
3	14:14	3	29	0:38	Clemson	Watson 21-yard touchdown run, Huegel kick good	3	21
4	14:13	4	80	1:54	Notre Dame	Prosise 56-yard touchdown reception from Kizer, 2-point pass failed	9	21
4	10:56	6	50	3:15	Clemson	35-yard field goal by Huegel	9	24
4	9:03	4	64	1:58	Notre Dame	Kizer 3-yard touchdown run, Yoon kick good	16	24
4	0:07	6	32	0:59	Notre Dame	Hunter Jr. 1-yard touchdown reception from Kizer, 2-point run failed	22	24
"TOP" = time of possession. For other American football terms, see Glossary of American football.							22	24

=== Georgia Tech ===
	1	2	3	4	Total
Yellow Jackets	3	7	7	7	24
#6 Tigers	19	14	7	3	43

=== Boston College ===
	1	2	3	4	Total
Eagles	7	3	0	7	17
#5 Tigers	10	7	10	7	34

=== Miami (FL) ===
	1	2	3	4	Total
#6 Tigers	21	21	3	13	58
Hurricanes	0	0	0	0	0

=== NC State ===
	1	2	3	4	Total
#3 Tigers	16	10	21	9	56
Wolfpack	13	7	7	14	41

=== Florida State ===
	1	2	3	4	Total
#16 Seminoles	7	3	3	0	13
#1 Tigers	3	3	7	10	23

=== Syracuse ===
	1	2	3	4	Total
#1 Tigers	21	10	0	6	37
Orange	14	3	7	3	27

=== Wake Forest ===
	1	2	3	4	Total
Demon Deacons	0	7	0	6	13
#1 Tigers	20	10	3	0	33

=== South Carolina ===
	1	2	3	4	Total
#1 Tigers	0	14	14	9	37
Gamecocks	0	3	14	15	32

=== ACC Championship Game ===
#1 Clemson Tigers vs #8 North Carolina Tar Heels – Game summary

Quarter	1	2	3	4	Total
#1 Tigers	7	14	14	10	45
#8 Tar Heels	9	7	7	14	37

at Bank of America Stadium • Charlotte, NC

- Date: December 5, 2015
- Game time: 8:00 p.m.
- TV announcers (ABC): Chris Fowler (play-by-play), Kirk Herbstreit (color), Heather Cox (sideline)

== CFP Playoff ==
=== Orange Bowl- CFP Semifinal Game ===
#4 Oklahoma Sooners vs #1 Clemson Tigers - Game summary

Quarter	1	2	3	4	Total
#4 Sooners	7	10	0	0	17
#1 Tigers	3	13	14	7	37

at Sun Life Stadium • Miami Gardens, Florida

- Date: December 31, 2015
- Game time: 4:00 p.m.
- Game weather: Outdoors
- Game attendance: 67,615
- Referee: Mike Cannon (Big Ten)
- TV announcers (ESPN): Brad Nessler (Play-by-Play), Todd Blackledge (Analyst), Holly Rowe (Sideline)

=== CFP Championship Game ===
#2 Alabama Crimson Tide vs #1 Clemson Tigers - Game summary

Quarter	1	2	3	4	Total
#2 Alabama	7	7	7	24	45
#1 Clemson	14	0	10	16	40

at University of Phoenix Stadium • Glendale, AZ

- Date: January 11, 2016
- Game time: 6:33 p.m.
- Game weather: Indoors
- Game attendance: 75,765
- Referee: Terry Leyden (Pac-12)
- TV announcers (ESPN): Chris Fowler (play-by-play), Kirk Herbstreit (color), Heather Cox & Tom Rinaldi (sideline)

== Rankings ==
Ranking movements Legend: ██ Increase in ranking ██ Decrease in ranking ( ) = First-place votes
	Week															
Poll	Pre	1	2	3	4	5	6	7	8	9	10	11	12	13	14	Final
AP	12	12	11	11	12	6	5 (1)	6 (1)	3 (6)	3 (6)	1 (31)	1 (34)	1 (55)	1 (53)	1 (51)	2
Coaches	12	12	9	10	11	6	6	6	6 (1)	5 (2)	2 (21)	1 (28)	1 (58)	1 (53)	1 (55)	2
CFP	Not released									1	1	1	1	1	1	Not released

== 2016 NFL draft ==
The Tigers had nine players drafted in the 2016 NFL draft. Shaq Lawson was picked first at 19th overall. Nine draftees is the most for Clemson since the 1983 NFL draft. It also gave the Tigers the second highest number of draftees in the 2016 NFL draft, second only to Ohio State with 12 players selected.

Player	Team	Round	Pick #	Position
Shaq Lawson	Buffalo Bills	1st	19th	DE
Kevin Dodd	Tennessee Titans	2nd	33rd	DE
Mackensie Alexander	Minnesota Vikings	2nd	54th	DB
T. J. Green	Indianapolis Colts	2nd	57th	S
B. J. Goodson	New York Giants	4th	109th	LB
D. J. Reader	Houston Texans	5th	166th	DT
Charone Peake	New York Jets	7th	241st	WR
Jayron Kearse	Minnesota Vikings	7th	244th	S
Zac Brooks	Seattle Seahawks	7th	247th	RB

== Awards and honors ==
National Coach of the Year Awards

- Dabo Swinney: AFCA, AP, CBS Sports, Home Depot, Maxwell Foundation, Paul "Bear" Bryant, Phil Steele, Sporting News, Sports Illustrated, Walter Camp

Broyles Award Finalist

- DC Brent Venables

Archie Griffin Award

- Deshaun Watson

Davey O'Brien Award

- Deshaun Watson

Manning Award

- Deshaun Watson

Heisman Trophy Finalist

- Deshaun Watson (3rd)

All-Americans

- QB Deshaun Watson‡: 1st Team - AP, AFCA, Athlon, FWAA, CBS Sports, ESPN, USA Today; 2nd Team - Walter Camp, Sporting News, Sports Illustrated
- DE Shaq Lawson‡: 1st Team - AP, AFCA, FWAA, Walter Camp, ESPN, USA Today; 2nd Team - Athlon, CBS Sports, Sporting News, Sports Illustrated
- SS Jayron Kearse: 1st Team - ESPN; 2nd Team - AP, Athlon, CBS Sports, Sports Illustrated
- TE Jordan Leggett: 2nd Team - Walter Camp; 3rd Team - Athlon, Honorable Mention - Sports Illustrated
- CB Mackensie Alexander: 2nd Team - Athlon; 3rd Team - AP; Honorable Mention - Sports Illustrated
- K Greg Huegel: 2nd Team - Sports Illustrated; Freshman Team - USA Today
- LB Ben Boulware: Honorable Mention - Sports Illustrated
- OT Mitch Hyatt: Freshman Team - FWAA, Sporting News, USA Today
- DT Christian Wilkins: Freshman Team - FWAA, Sporting News

‡ - Consensus All-Americans

ACC Coach of the Year

- Dabo Swinney

ACC Player of the Year

- Deshaun Watson

ACC Offensive Player of the Year

- Deshaun Watson

All-ACC:

- 1st Team: QB Deshaun Watson, WR Artavis Scott, OG Eric MacLain, DE Shaq Lawson, DT Carlos Watkins, CB Mackensie Alexander
- 2nd Team: RB Wayne Gallman, TE Jordan Leggett, C Jay Guillermo, LB Ben Boulware, LB B. J. Goodson, S Jayron Kearse, K Greg Huegel
- 3rd Team: OG Tyrone Crowder, OT Joe Gore, OT Mitch Hyatt, CB Cordrea Tankersley
