= Jordan Leggett =

American football player (born 1995)

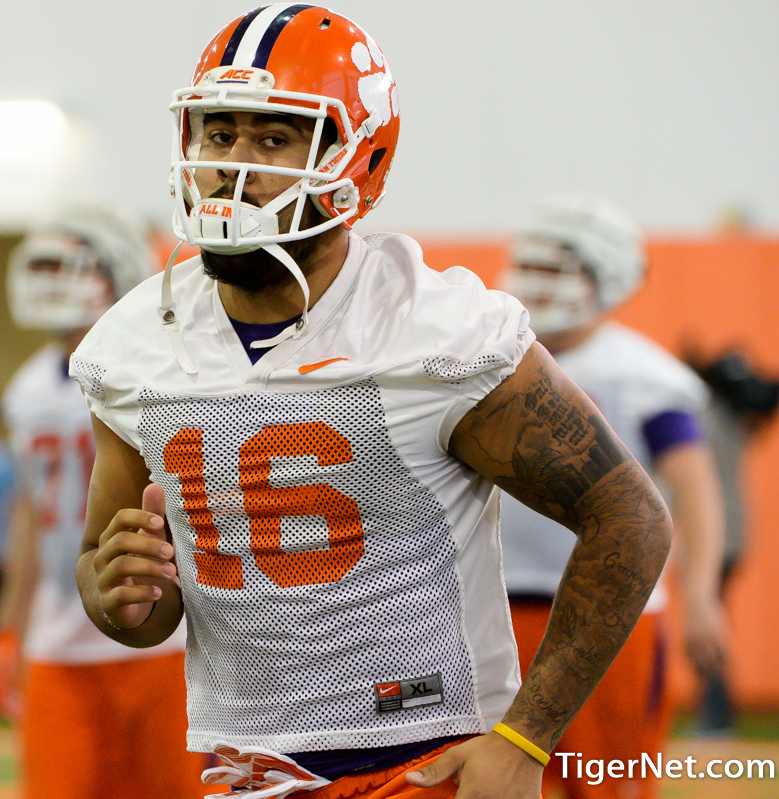
- Leggett with the Clemson Tigers in 2016

No. 86
- Position: Tight end

Personal information
- Born: January 31, 1995 (age 31); Navarre, Florida, U.S.
- Listed height: 6 ft 5 in (1.96 m)
- Listed weight: 258 lb (117 kg)

Career information
- High school: Navarre
- College: Clemson (2013–2016)
- NFL draft: 2017: 5th round, 150th overall pick

Career history
- New York Jets (2017–2018); Tampa Bay Buccaneers (2019); Denver Broncos (2020)*
- * Offseason or practice squad member only

Awards and highlights
- CFP national champion (2016); Second-team All-American (2015); First-team All-ACC (2016); Second-team All-ACC (2015)

Career NFL statistics
- Receptions: 14
- Receiving yards: 114
- Receiving touchdowns: 1
- Stats at Pro Football Reference

Jordan Kristopher Leggett (born January 31, 1995) is an American former professional football player who was a tight end in the National Football League (NFL). He played college football for the Clemson Tigers. He was selected by the New York Jets in the fifth round of the 2017 NFL draft.

== Early life ==
Leggett attended Navarre High School in Navarre, Florida, where he played high school football. He was rated by Rivals.com as a three-star recruit and committed to Clemson University to play college football.

== College career ==
As a true freshman at Clemson in 2013, Leggett played in 10 games, recording 10 receptions for 176 yards and two touchdowns. As a sophomore in 2014, he started seven of 11 games and had 14 receptions for 161 yards and one touchdown. As a junior in 2015, he was a finalist for the John Mackey Award.

Leggett's Clemson teams won four bowl games, three BCS/New Years Six bowls, and played in two national championship games, winning one in 2017. Leggett won the Orange Bowl as a freshman against Ohio State, the Russell Athletic Bowl as a sophomore against Oklahoma, the Orange Bowl as a junior against Oklahoma, and the Fiesta Bowl as a senior against Ohio State. Leggett's only bowl loss was in the 2015–16 National Championship Game against Alabama.

On January 9, 2017, Leggett was part of the Clemson team that defeated top-ranked Alabama in the 2017 College Football Playoff National Championship by a score of 35–31. In the game, he recorded seven receptions for 95 yards.

=== College statistics ===
Year	Team	Conf	Class	Pos	G	Rec	Yds	Avg	TD
2013	Clemson	ACC	FR	TE	7	12	176	14.7	2
2014	Clemson	ACC	SO	TE	9	14	161	11.5	1
2015	Clemson	ACC	JR	TE	15	40	525	13.1	8
2016	Clemson	ACC	SR	TE	13	46	736	16.0	7
Career						112	1.598	14.3	18

== Professional career ==
=== Pre-draft ===
As one of the top tight end prospects, Leggett received an invitation to play in the 2017 Senior Bowl, but declined to participate. He was one of 19 collegiate tight ends to receive an invitation to the NFL Scouting Combine in Indianapolis, Indiana. Leggett opted to only perform the vertical jump, broad jump, three-cone drill, and short shuttle at the combine. He finished fourth among tight ends in the short shuttle, eighth in the three-cone drill, tied for eighth in the vertical jump, tied for tenth in the bench press, and tied for 11th among his position group in the broad jump. On March 16, 2017, Leggett attended Clemson's pro day, along with Deshaun Watson, Mike Williams, Carlos Watkins, Artavis Scott, Wayne Gallman, Ben Boulware, Cordrea Tankersley, and six other players. He performed the rest of the combine drills he skipped at the combine for the scouts and team representatives from all 32 NFL teams. At the conclusion of the pre-draft process, Leggett was projected to be a third or fourth round pick by the majority of NFL draft experts and scouts. He was ranked the fourth best tight end prospect by NFL senior analyst Gil Brandt and was ranked the seventh best by NFLDraftScout.com and NFL analyst Mike Mayock.

Pre-draft measurables
Height	Weight	Arm length	Hand span	40-yard dash	10-yard split	20-yard split	20-yard shuttle	Three-cone drill	Vertical jump	Broad jump	Bench press
6 ft 5 1/2 in (1.97 m)	258 lb (117 kg)	33 1/2 in (0.85 m)	10 3/8 in (0.26 m)	4.71 s	1.70 s	2.70 s	4.33 s	7.12 s	33 in (0.84 m)	9 ft 6 in (2.90 m)	18 reps
All values from NFL Combine/Clemson's Pro Day

=== New York Jets ===
Leggett was selected by the New York Jets in the fifth round (150th overall) of the 2017 NFL draft. He was the tenth tight end selected. On May 18, 2017, the Jets signed Leggett to a four-year, $2.86 million with a $282,052 signing bonus. Throughout training camp, Leggett competed against Austin Seferian-Jenkins and Eric Tomlinson for the job as the starting tight end. Leggett was slated to begin the season as the starting tight end with Seferian-Jenkins serving a two-game suspension for a DUI. After the second preseason game, Leggett suffered a knee injury, and was placed on injured reserve on October 31. On November 9, Leggett announced he had successfully undergone knee surgery.

In Week 4 of the 2018 season, Leggett recorded his first three career receptions, which went for 13 yards and one touchdown, in the team's loss to the Jacksonville Jaguars. On May 20, 2019, the Jets waived Leggett.

=== Tampa Bay Buccaneers ===
On May 21, 2019, Leggett was claimed off waivers by the Tampa Bay Buccaneers. On August 31, Leggett was waived by the Buccaneers and re-signed to the team's practice squad. On October 30, Leggett was promoted to the active roster. He was waived on December 24, and re-signed to the practice squad. Leggett signed a reserve/future contract with the Buccaneers on December 31. He was waived by Tampa Bay on July 30, 2020.

Leggett had a tryout with the Baltimore Ravens on August 22, 2020.

=== Denver Broncos ===
On November 16, 2020, Leggett was signed to the Denver Broncos' practice squad. He signed a reserve/future contract with Denver on January 4, 2021. On February 2, the Broncos waived Leggett.
