= Deshaun Watson =

American football player (born 1995)

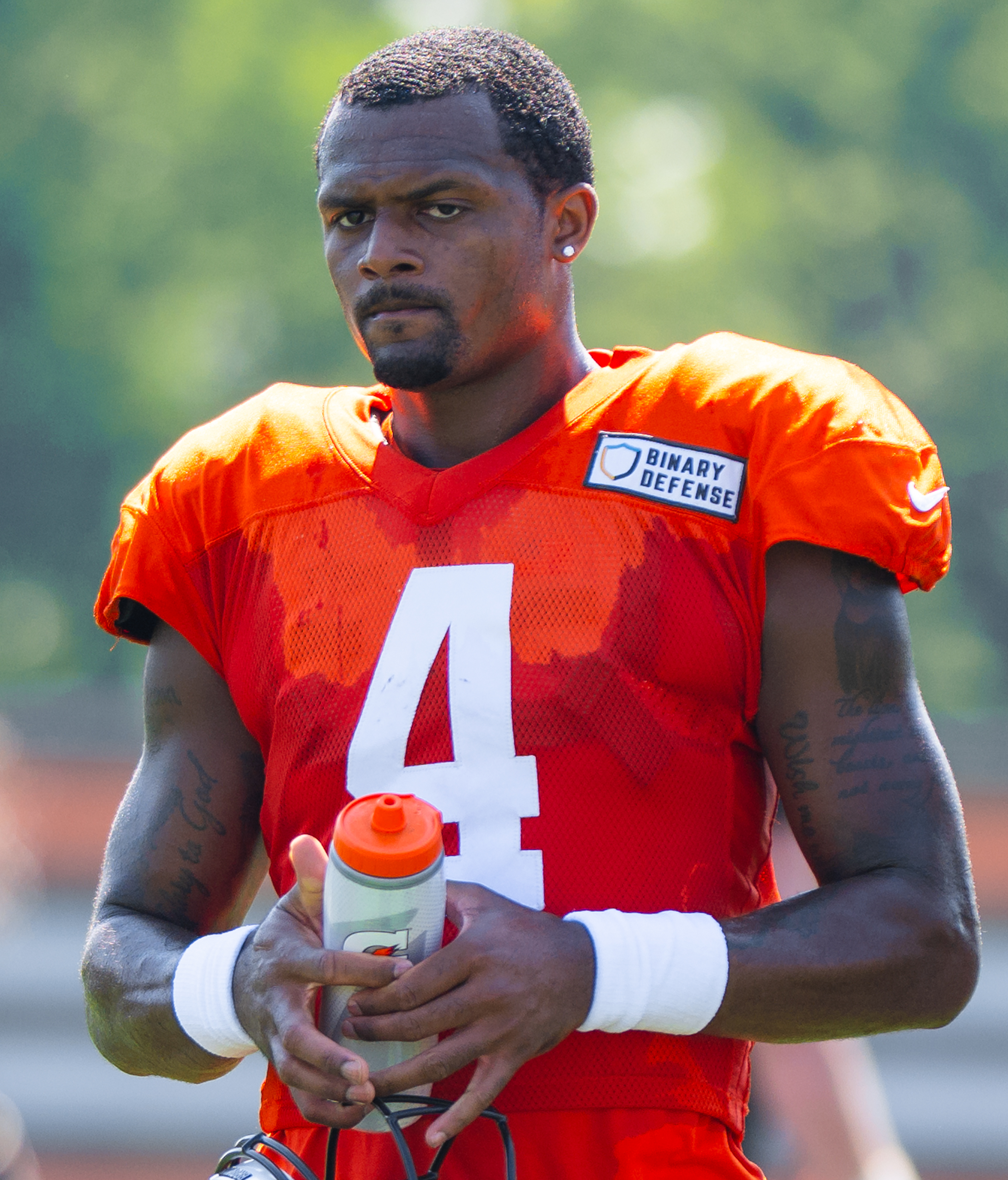
- Watson with the Cleveland Browns in 2023

No. 4 – Cleveland Browns
- Position: Quarterback
- Roster status: Active

Personal information
- Born: September 14, 1995 (age 31); Gainesville, Georgia, U.S.
- Listed height: 6 ft 3 in (1.91 m)
- Listed weight: 223 lb (101 kg)

Career information
- High school: Gainesville
- College: Clemson (2014–2016)
- NFL draft: 2017: 1st round, 12th overall pick

Career history
- Houston Texans (2017–2021); Cleveland Browns (2022–present)

Awards and highlights
- 3× Pro Bowl (2018–2020); NFL passing yards leader (2020); PFWA All-Rookie Team (2017); CFP national champion (2016); CFP National Championship Offensive MVP (2016); Johnny Unitas Golden Arm Award (2016); 2× Davey O'Brien Award (2015, 2016); 2× Manning Award (2015, 2016); Consensus All-American (2015); Second-team All-American (2016); 2× ACC Athlete of the Year (2016, 2017); ACC Player of the Year (2015); ACC Offensive Player of the Year (2015); First-team All-ACC (2015); Second-team All-ACC (2016); NFL records: Most pass attempts in a game with a perfect passer rating: 33 (tied) (Note: Tied with Jared Goff.)

Career NFL statistics as of Week 10, 2026
- Passing attempts: 2,594
- Passing completions: 1,715
- Completion percentage: 66.1%
- TD–INT: 130–52
- Passing yards: 20,022
- Passer rating: 97.7
- Rushing yards: 2,408
- Rushing touchdowns: 22
- Stats at Pro Football Reference

Derrick Deshaun Watson (born September 14, 1995) is an American professional football quarterback for the Cleveland Browns of the National Football League (NFL). He played college football for the Clemson Tigers, leading the team to a national championship in 2016. Watson was selected in the first round of the 2017 NFL draft by the Houston Texans.

After having a productive rookie season cut short by injury, Watson guided the Texans to consecutive division titles in 2018 and 2019 and led the league in passing yards in 2020. He also received Pro Bowl honors in each of his three seasons as Houston's primary starter. He is currently 10th in career completion percentage at 66.3% and 6th in all-time career passer rating at 98.75 (Note: Both leaderboards are minimum 1,500 pass attempts.).

In 2021, Watson was sued by more than two dozen female massage therapists for sexual harassment and sexual assault. Watson has denied any wrongdoing while settling 20 claims of sexual misconduct. Disagreements with the Texans' front office, and multiple sexual-misconduct lawsuits, kept Watson out for the entire 2021 season and eventually led to a trade to the Browns in 2022. With Cleveland, Watson signed a five-year contract worth $230 million, one of the largest contracts in NFL history.

== Early life ==
Watson was born in Gainesville, Georgia, on September 14, 1995, to Deann Watson and Don Richardson. He attended Gainesville High School from the fall of 2010 and played for the school's Red Elephants football team. Gainesville head coach Bruce Miller had planned to start a rising junior at quarterback to execute his spread offense, but Watson won the starting spot, becoming Miller's first-ever freshman starting quarterback.

During his high-school career, Watson set numerous state records, including those for total yards (17,134), total touchdowns (218), career passing yards (13,077) and career passing touchdowns (155). He rushed for 4,057 yards and 63 touchdowns. Watson excelled in his junior year, winning a state championship and earning accolades such as Junior All-American, 2014 Player to Watch and 2014 Top 100 Recruit. During his sophomore and senior years, Watson led Gainesville to the state semifinals.

Watson received offers from numerous colleges before verbally committing to Clemson University on February 1, 2012. He was ranked as the top quarterback recruit for the 2014 class by ESPN 300.

== College career ==
=== Freshman year ===
Watson enrolled at Clemson in January 2014. During his high-school career, Watson had worn #4, but at Clemson, that number had been retired after quarterback Steve Fuller graduated. However, Fuller allowed Watson to wear the number. Watson entered his true freshman season as the backup to starter Cole Stoudt, but still received extensive playing time. Through three games, he completed 29 of 41 passes for 479 yards with four touchdowns and no interceptions, outperforming Stoudt. Watson was named the Tigers' starter on September 21. In Watson's first career start against the North Carolina Tar Heels, he set a school record with six touchdown passes and threw for 435 yards en route to a 50–35 victory.

On October 11, 2014, Watson broke a bone in his right hand in the first quarter of a game against the Louisville Cardinals. As a result of the injury, he missed games against Boston College, Syracuse and Wake Forest. He returned for a game against Georgia Tech only to suffer an LCL strain, missing most of the game. He did not play against Georgia State the following week, but led Clemson to a victory over state rival South Carolina the following week. It was revealed that Watson had played the game with a torn ACL in his left knee. He underwent surgery the Friday before Clemson's bowl game against Oklahoma.

=== Sophomore year ===
In 2015, Watson led Clemson to an undefeated 12–0 regular season and a #1 ranking in the polls. After the regular season, the Tigers qualified for the ACC Championship Game, facing off against #10 North Carolina. Watson threw for 289 yards and three touchdowns and ran for 131 yards and two touchdowns to lead the Tigers to a 45–37 win, Clemson's first ACC championship since 2011. Watson was also named the ACC Championship Game MVP.

The Tigers were selected to participate in the 2016 College Football Playoff as the #1 seed. They faced the #4 seed Oklahoma Sooners in the Orange Bowl, one of the two College Football Playoff semifinal games. Watson threw for 189 yards and a touchdown and ran for 145 yards and a touchdown as he led Clemson to a 37–17 victory, earning game MVP honors.

With the win, the Tigers advanced to the 2016 College Football Playoff National Championship game against the #2 Alabama Crimson Tide, but Clemson lost 45–40. Watson threw for 405 yards and four touchdowns in the game and ran for 73 yards in the losing effort, though he surpassed the 4,000-yard passing mark. He set the record for most total yards in national championship game history, with 478 yards (405 passing / 73 rushing) against the nation's best defense. In addition to throwing for over 4,000 yards, he also rushed for over 1,000 yards to complete his true sophomore season. Watson was the first player to accomplish this feat in the history of college football.

For his accomplishments during the 2015 season, Watson was named a finalist for the Heisman Trophy, the first time that a Clemson player had been invited to the Heisman Trophy presentation. He finished third in the balloting after Heisman winner Derrick Henry, an Alabama running back, and Stanford running back Christian McCaffrey. Watson's third-place finish was the highest in Clemson football history. He won the Davey O'Brien Award, which is awarded annually to the top college quarterback. He was also named the 2015 ACC Player of the Year and ACC Offensive Player of the Year.

=== Junior year ===
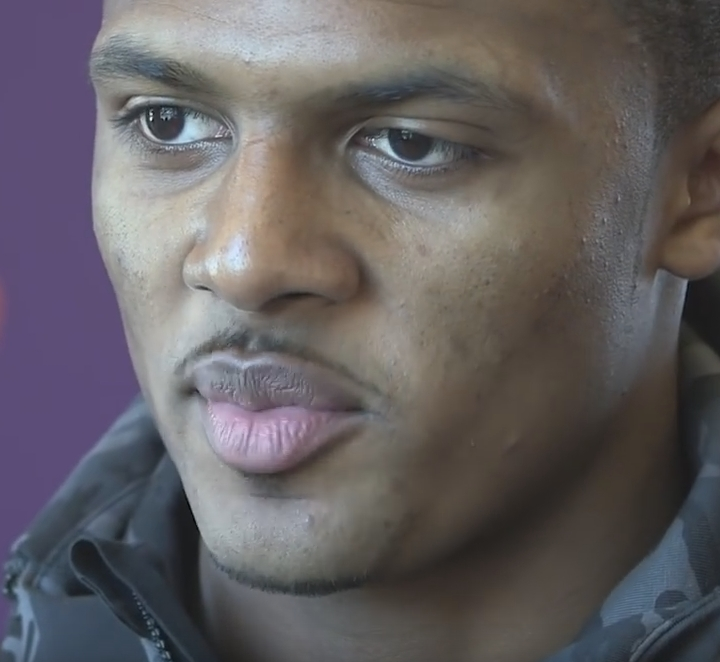
Watson in 2016

Watson started his junior season positively with 248 passing yards, one touchdown, and one interception in a narrow 19–13 victory over the Auburn Tigers. On October 1, Watson threw for 306 passing yards, five touchdowns, and three interceptions in a 42–36 victory over Louisville. He totaled 378 passing yards and two touchdowns against Florida State on October 29, rallying to a 37–34 win. Against Syracuse on November 5, he threw for 169 passing yards with two touchdowns but left the game with an apparent shoulder injury. On November 26, he passed for 347 yards, six touchdowns and one interception in a 56–7 victory over South Carolina.

In the fall of 2016, Watson became the first player since Jason White in 2003–2004 to win the Davey O'Brien Award in consecutive years. He was also named winner of the Johnny Unitas Golden Arm Award and was the first repeat winner of the Manning Award. For the second consecutive year, Watson was named one of the five Heisman Trophy candidates, along with Michigan's Jabrill Peppers, Oklahoma's Baker Mayfield and Dede Westbrook and Louisville's Lamar Jackson. He again came up short, as Louisville's Lamar Jackson was awarded the Heisman Trophy, finishing with nearly twice as many first-place votes as had Watson.

After defeating Ohio State 31–0 in the CFP semifinal in the Fiesta Bowl and receiving the offensive MVP award, Clemson defeated No. 1 Alabama 35–31 in the 2017 College Football Playoff National Championship. Watson completed 36 of 56 passes for 420 yards and three touchdowns against the nation's top-ranked defense, including the last-second game-winning pass to wide receiver Hunter Renfrow. He also rushed for 43 yards and a touchdown. The win marked Clemson's second national championship, ending a three-decade national-championship drought. Watson was named the game's offensive MVP.

On November 8, 2016, Watson, along with three other Clemson players, Wayne Gallman, Artavis Scott and Mike Williams, declared for the NFL draft. In December, Watson graduated with a degree in communications after three years at Clemson.

== Professional career ==
=== Pre-draft ===
Watson was projected as a first-round pick by the majority of scouts and analysts. He was ranked as the top quarterback available in the draft by Sports Illustrated, Pro Football Focus and ESPN. He was ranked the second-best quarterback by NFLDraftScout.com.

Pre-draft measurables
Height	Weight	Arm length	Hand span	Wingspan	40-yard dash	10-yard split	20-yard split	20-yard shuttle	Three-cone drill	Vertical jump	Broad jump	Wonderlic
6 ft 2 1/2 in (1.89 m)	221 lb (100 kg)	33 in (0.84 m)	9 3/4 in (0.25 m)	6 ft 7 7/8 in (2.03 m)	4.66 s	1.53 s	2.72 s	4.31 s	6.95 s	32.5 in (0.83 m)	9 ft 11 in (3.02 m)	20
All values from NFL Combine

=== Houston Texans ===
==== 2017 ====
The Houston Texans drafted Watson in the first round (12th overall) of the 2017 NFL draft. The Texans had acquired the pick from the Cleveland Browns, trading their 25th overall pick in the 2017 NFL Draft and their first round pick in the 2018 NFL draft. Houston had already traded quarterback Brock Osweiler to Cleveland for draft picks earlier that year as part of what was widely considered the NFL's first major "salary dump." Watson was the third quarterback taken in the draft behind Mitchell Trubisky, who went second overall to the Chicago Bears, and Patrick Mahomes, who went tenth overall to the Kansas City Chiefs.

On May 12, 2017, the Texans signed Watson to a four-year, $13.84 million contract featuring an $8.21 million signing bonus. Watson made his first regular-season appearance on September 10, 2017, against the Jacksonville Jaguars. He entered the game after Tom Savage was benched at halftime and played for the remainder of the game. In the third quarter, he threw his first NFL touchdown, a four-yard pass to wide receiver DeAndre Hopkins. He finished with 102 passing yards, a touchdown and an interception as the Texans lost 29–7.

Watson made his first career start on September 14, his 22nd birthday, in an away game against the Cincinnati Bengals. He finished with 125 passing yards, 67 rushing yards and a 49-yard rushing touchdown as the Texans won 13–9. In Week 4 against the Tennessee Titans, he completed 25 of 34 passes for 283 yards, four touchdowns, and an interception while also rushing for 24 yards and a touchdown as the Texans won 57–14. His five total scores tied the NFL rookie touchdown record. He also became the first rookie to pass for at least four touchdowns and rush for one touchdown in a game since Hall of Famer Fran Tarkenton in 1961. His performance earned him AFC Offensive Player of the Week honors. Watson followed up his Week 4 performance with another great outing against the Kansas City Chiefs. In the 42–34 loss, Watson finished 16-of-31 for 261 yards and five touchdown passes, tying an NFL rookie record for touchdown passes thrown in a single game. He also rushed for 31 yards. In Week 8 against the Seattle Seahawks, Watson posted his first game with over 400 passing yards. He finished with 402 passing yards, four touchdowns, three interceptions and 67 rushing yards, though the Texans lost 41–38. Watson threw 16 touchdowns in the month of October, setting the NFL record for touchdown passes by a rookie in a calendar month. He was named AFC Offensive Player of the Month and the NFL Offensive Rookie of the Month for October.

On November 2, Watson tore his ACL on a non-contact play during practice, prematurely ending his rookie season. In seven games (six starts) during his rookie year, Watson amassed 1,699 passing yards, 19 touchdowns and eight interceptions while rushing for 269 yards and two touchdowns. On November 8, Watson underwent successful surgery on his right knee to repair his ACL, and no further damage was reported. Watson was ranked 50th by his peers on the NFL Top 100 Players of 2018 list. He was named to the PFWA All-Rookie Team, becoming the second Texans quarterback to receive the award since David Carr had done so in 2002.

==== 2018 ====
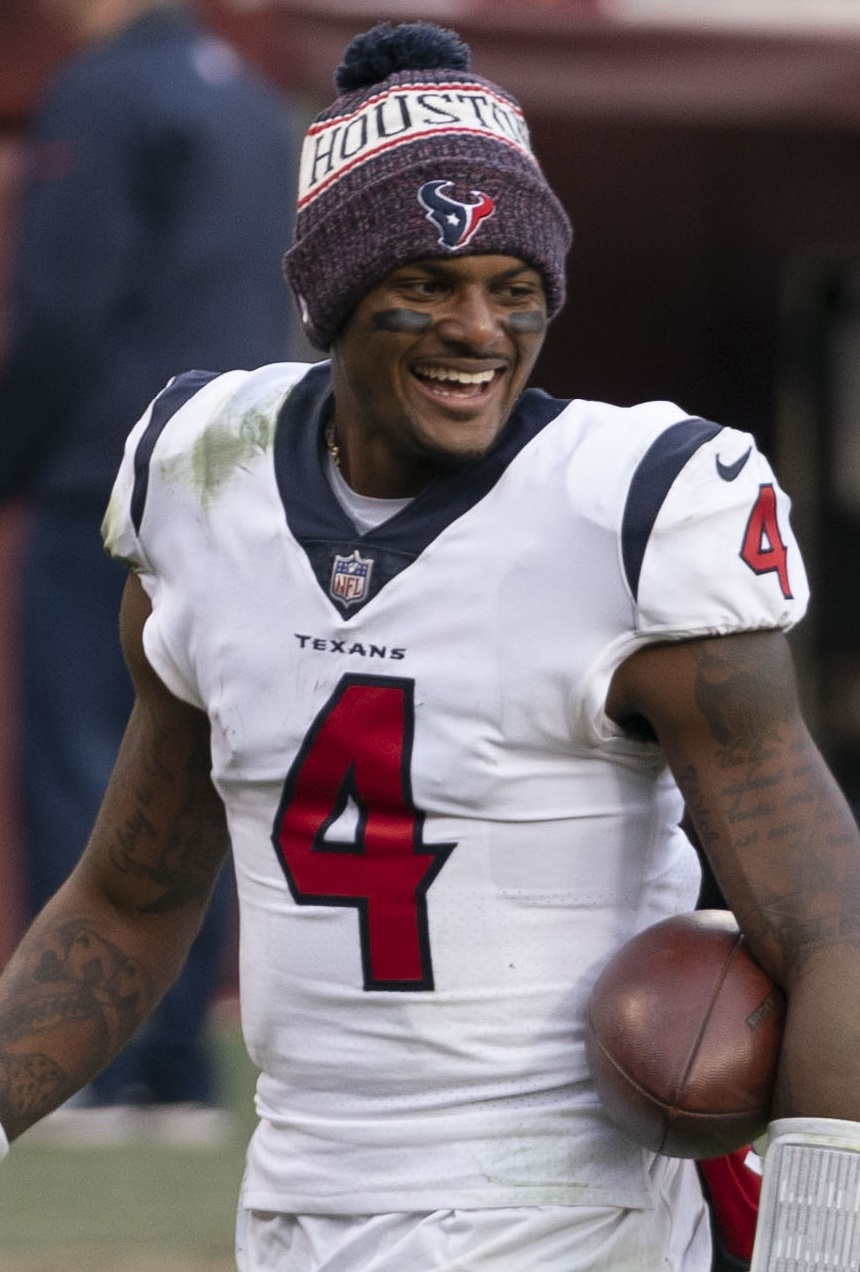
Watson in Landover, Maryland, in 2018

In the season opener on September 9 against the New England Patriots, Watson returned from injury and threw for 176 yards with a touchdown and an interception and rushed for 40 yards as the Texans lost 27–20. After suffering broken ribs and a partially collapsed lung, Watson took a 12-hour bus ride from Houston to Jacksonville for a Week 7 game against the Jaguars rather than flying because of fears about the effects of air pressure on his chest. He passed for 139 yards and a touchdown in the 20–7 victory. The next week, Watson tied his career high with five touchdowns in a 42–23 victory over the Miami Dolphins.

Watson finished the regular season with a career-high 4,165 passing yards, 26 touchdowns, 9 interceptions, 551 rushing yards and 5 rushing touchdowns, as Houston went 11–5 and won the AFC South title. Watson led the league in average time spent in the pocket and was second in average time before throwing. Watson faced the most dropbacks under pressure (281) and tied for the fifth-most times sacked in a single season with 62.

In Watson's first postseason appearance, the Texans hosted the Indianapolis Colts in the Wild Card round. Watson completed 29 of 49 passes for 235 yards as the Texans lost 21–7.

On January 21, 2019, Watson was named to his first Pro Bowl, replacing the Super Bowl-bound Tom Brady. He was ranked 51st by his fellow players on the NFL Top 100 Players of 2019 list.

==== 2019 ====
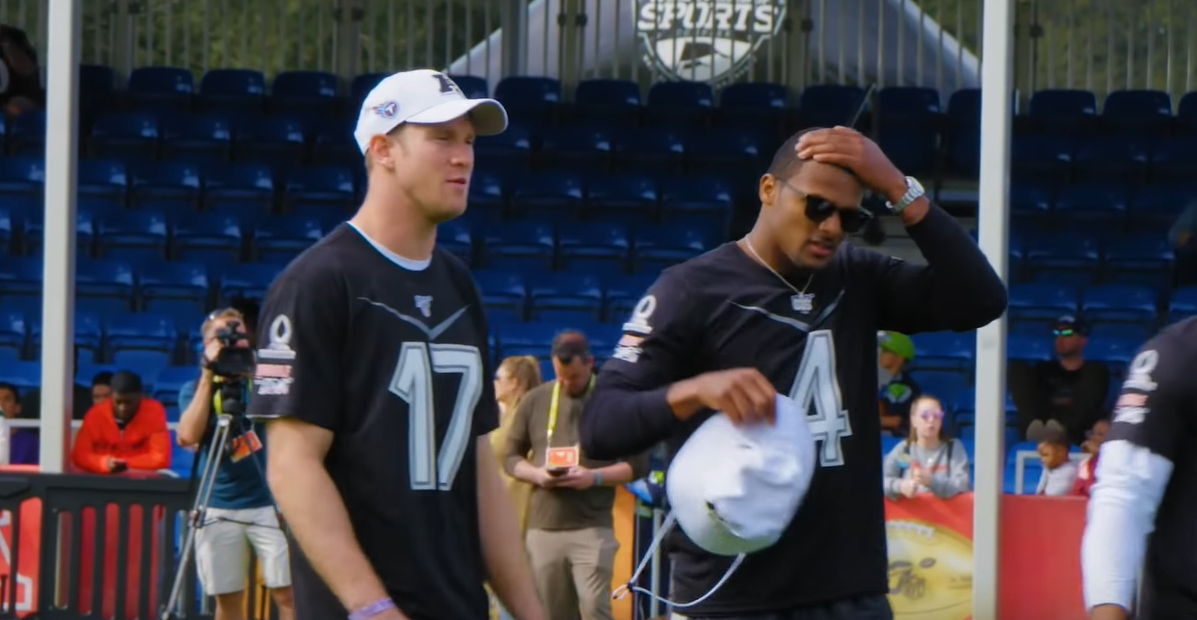
Watson alongside Ryan Tannehill at the 2020 Pro Bowl

In the season opener against the New Orleans Saints, Watson completed 20 of 30 passes for 268 yards, three touchdowns, and an interception while also rushing for 40 yards and a touchdown as the Texans lost 28–30. In a Week 3 27–20 road victory against the Los Angeles Chargers, he threw for 351 yards and three touchdowns, including a 53-yard touchdown to tight end Jordan Akins. Watson was named AFC Offensive Player of the Week. Two weeks later against the Atlanta Falcons, Watson threw for 426 yards and five touchdowns with no interceptions for a perfect passer rating in a 53–32 victory, earning him his second AFC Offensive Player of the Week award. In the next game against the Chiefs, Watson threw for 280 yards, a touchdown, and two interceptions. He also rushed 10 times for 42 yards and two touchdowns in the 31–24 road victory. During Week 8 against the Oakland Raiders, he threw for 279 yards and three touchdowns in a 27–24 victory. During a play near the end of the fourth quarter, Watson was kicked in the eye by defensive end Arden Key's cleat while escaping a sack but managed to blindly throw a touchdown pass to tight end Darren Fells. During Week 13 against the Patriots, he threw for 234 yards and three touchdowns and caught a six-yard touchdown pass from wide receiver DeAndre Hopkins in a 28–22 victory en route to his third AFC Offensive Player of the Week award of the season. Watson helped lead the Texans to a 10–6 record and an AFC South title. He finished the season with 3,852 passing yards, 26 passing touchdowns and 12 interceptions along with 413 rushing yards and seven rushing touchdowns.

In the Wild Card Round against the Buffalo Bills, Watson led the Texans back from a 16–0 deficit to win 22–19 in overtime, his first NFL playoff victory, despite being sacked seven times. He sealed the game by spinning out of a potential sack by two Bills defenders and finding Taiwan Jones, who ran to the Buffalo 10-yard line to set up the game-winning field goal in overtime. He finished the game with 247 passing yards and a touchdown along with 55 rushing yards and a rushing touchdown. In the divisional round against the Chiefs, Watson threw for 388 yards and two touchdowns and rushed for 37 yards and a touchdown as the Texans lost on the road 51–31 after having blown a 24–0 second-quarter lead.

==== 2020 ====
On April 28, 2020, the Texans exercised the fifth-year option on Watson's contract. On September 5, Watson signed a four-year, $177.5 million contract extension with $111 million in guarantees, keeping him under contract through the 2025 season. This marked the second-most lucrative contract in NFL history after that of Aaron Rodgers.

In the Week 1 NFL Kickoff Game against the Chiefs, Watson threw for 253 yards, one touchdown and one interception and rushed for 27 yards and a touchdown during a 34–20 loss. In Week 4 against the Minnesota Vikings, Watson threw for 300 yards and two touchdowns as the Texans lost 23–31. In Week 11 against the Patriots, Watson threw for 344 yards and two touchdowns and rushed for 36 yards and another touchdown during a 27–20 win, earning the AFC Offensive Player of the Week award. In Week 12, a 41–25 win over the Detroit Lions, Watson passed for 318 yards and four passing touchdowns. With his Week 12 performance, Watson briefly became the NFL's all-time regular-season career passer-rating leader before being surpassed five days later by Patrick Mahomes.

Watson was fined $7,500 by the Texans in December 2020 for violating the league's COVID-19 protocols after he and several teammates gathered at the opening of his new restaurant without wearing face masks. Watson finished the season with a pair of three-touchdown performances against the Bengals in Week 16 and the Titans in Week 18, but Houston lost both games.

In spite of the team's 4–12 record, Watson finished the 2020 season with a league-leading 4,823 passing yards, as well as 33 touchdowns to only seven interceptions. His season was, by all major statistical measures, the best in franchise history, leading in passing touchdowns, passing yards and passer rating. He became the first player to lead the league in passing yards on a team with at least 12 losses since Jeff George of the Oakland Raiders in 1997.

==== 2021 ====
Following the 2020 season, Watson requested a trade by the Texans after becoming disgruntled with changes in the front office and coaching staff. The Texans were not willing to negotiate with other teams regarding trade offers, leading to a standoff with Watson until the emergence of sexual-harassment allegations. Despite the off-field controversies and Watson's situation with the team, he participated in OTA activities and training camp, albeit on a limited basis. Watson was named to the Texans' 53-man roster to start the season along with free-agent signing Tyrod Taylor and rookie Davis Mills. Texans general manager Nick Caserio stated that he would handle Watson's situation "one day at a time."

Despite not being officially suspended or placed on any reserve list, Watson was ruled out for every Texans game played in 2021 for "non-injury reasons/personal matter."

=== Cleveland Browns ===
==== 2022 ====
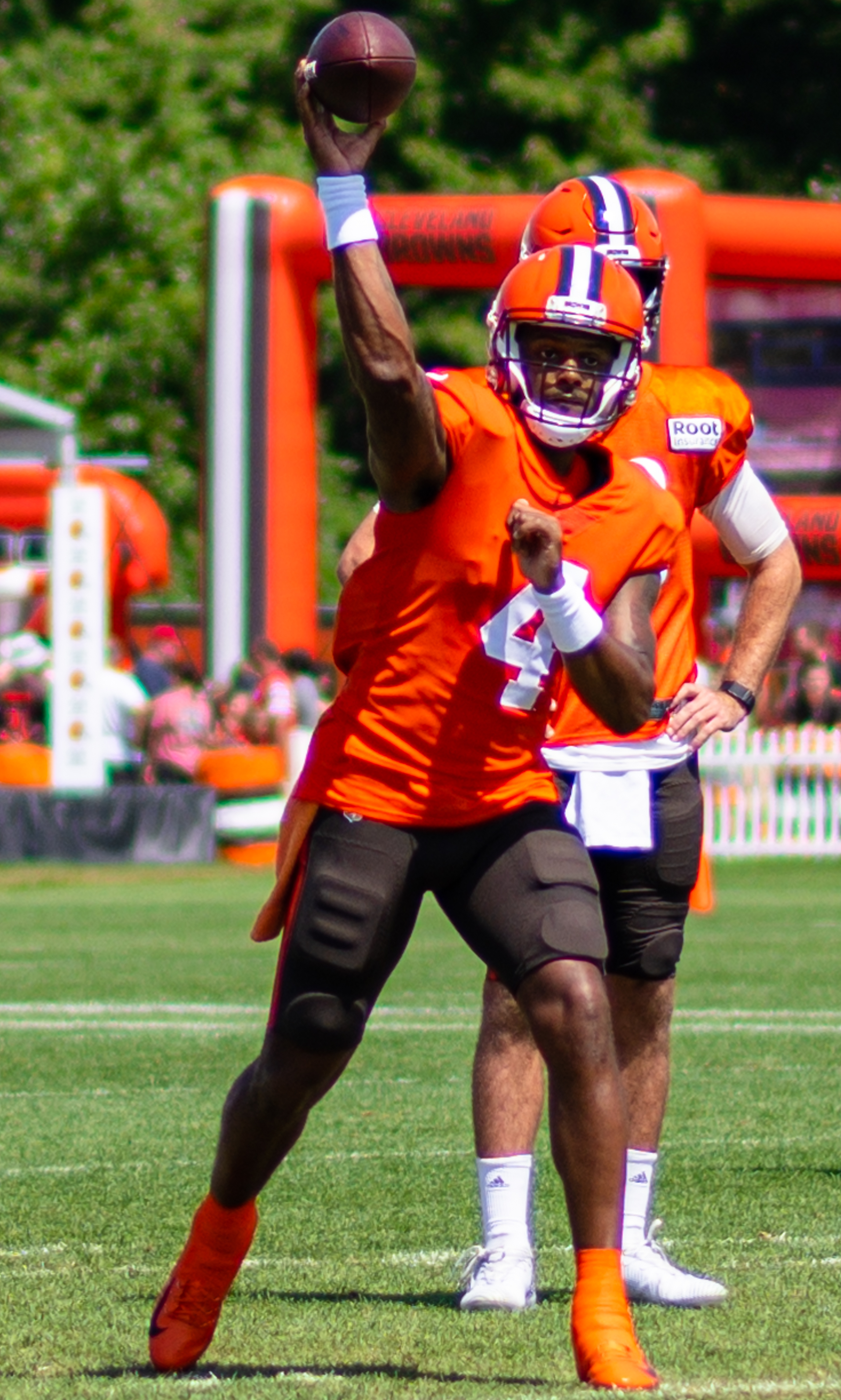
Watson with the Cleveland Browns during training camp in 2022

On March 18, 2022, Watson and the Texans' 2024 sixth-round draft pick were traded to the Browns in exchange for the Browns' first-round draft picks in 2022, 2023, and 2024, as well as the Browns' third-round pick in 2023 and fourth-round picks in 2022 and 2024. As part of the trade, Watson signed a new, fully guaranteed, five-year, $230 million deal with the Browns, making it the largest guaranteed contract in NFL history at the time of the signing. The fact the contract was fully guaranteed later led to a collusion scandal involving the league and the NFL Players Association that was made public in July 2025, and later led to the resignations of NFLPA executive director Lloyd Howell and chief strategy officer J.C. Tretter a few days afterward.

As a result of his sexual harassment allegations, Watson was suspended for six regular season games to start the 2022 season by arbiter Sue Lewis Robinson. He was allowed to participate in preseason activities, including preseason games. Two days later the NFL appealed of the suspension, seeking a suspension for at least full season (17 regular season games), as well as seeking a fine and establishing a clause in which Watson would seek treatment for his conduct. NFL Commissioner Roger Goodell confirmed that the NFL would seek a full-year suspension including the postseason for what Goodell described as "egregious" and "predatory behavior". The appeal was reviewed by former New Jersey Attorney General Peter C. Harvey.

On August 18, 2022, after the NFL and the NFLPA reached a settlement, Watson was suspended for the first 11 games of the 2022 regular season and was fined $5 million.

On November 28, 2022, Watson was reinstated from his suspension and was officially added to the 53-man roster. In Week 13, Watson started against his former team, the Texans. In his first game in 700 days, Watson posted the worst passer rating of his NFL career at 53.4, throwing for 131 yards and one interception in the 27–14 win. Watson finished the 2022 season with a 3–3 record as starting quarterback, with 1,102 passing yards, 7 touchdowns, and 5 interceptions as he closed out the last six games of the season. The Browns finished with a 7–10 record, and Watson's passer rating of 79.1 for the season was the lowest of his career.

==== 2023 ====
Watson started the first three games of the 2023 season but missed the following three games due to a rotator cuff strain. He returned in Week 7 but left in the first quarter after reinjuring his shoulder. He returned again in Week 9. In Week 10 against the Baltimore Ravens, Watson suffered a displaced fracture to the glenoid in his right shoulder during the first half, but he was able to finish the game. Three days later, on November 15, the Browns announced that Watson would undergo season-ending surgery to repair a broken bone in his throwing shoulder. Watson finished the season starting in six games, finishing with seven touchdowns and four interceptions and 1,115 passing yards. Watson underwent surgery on November 21, with the expectation to be fully recovered before the 2024 NFL season.

==== 2024 ====
In Week 1 against the Cowboys, Watson threw for 169 yards, one touchdown, two interceptions, and was sacked six times in a 33–17 loss. Watson was also 0-for-10 on passes thrown 15+ yards downfield, becoming the first quarterback to have 10+ passes thrown 15 or more yards downfield with zero completions since Sportradar began tracking air yards in 2006. Through five games, Watson posted a league-low 23.9 total QBR and failed to achieve over 200 passing yards in a game as the Browns dropped to 1–4. Despite the struggles, head coach Kevin Stefanski stated that Watson would continue to start for Cleveland. On October 20, during the Browns' Week 7 matchup against the Cincinnati Bengals, Watson was carted off the field after suffering a non-contact leg injury. The following day, it was confirmed to be an Achilles tear, which forced him to miss the rest of the 2024 season. Watson underwent Achilles surgery on October 25. With Watson at quarterback, the Browns went 1–6 and ranked last in the NFL with 253.9 yards of offense per game.

==== 2025 ====
On January 9, 2025, Watson underwent surgery after he suffered a re-rupture to his right Achilles tendon, keeping him out for the entire 2025 season.

==== 2026 ====
With his Achilles healed, Watson competed with Shedeur Sanders for the Browns' starting quarterback job ahead of the 2026 season. Head coach Todd Monken named Watson the starter on August 24, citing his experience.

== Career statistics ==
Legend
	Led the league
**Bold**	Career high

=== NFL ===
==== Regular season ====
Year	Team	Games			Passing									Rushing					Sacks		Fumbles	
Year	Team	GP	GS	Record	Cmp	Att	Pct	Yds	Avg	Lng	TD	Int	Rtg	Att	Yds	Avg	Lng	TD	Sck	SckY	Fum	Lost
2017	HOU	7	6	3–3	126	204	61.8	1,699	8.3	72	19	8	103.0	36	269	**7.5**	**49**	2	19	116	3	1
2018	HOU	16	16	**11–5**	345	505	68.3	4,165	8.2	73	26	9	103.1	**99**	**551**	5.6	34	5	**62**	**384**	9	**3**
2019	HOU	15	15	10–5	333	495	67.3	3,852	7.8	54	26	**12**	98.0	82	413	5.0	30	**7**	44	257	**10**	**3**
2020	HOU	16	16	4–12	**382**	**544**	**70.2**	**4,823**	**8.9**	**77**	**33**	7	**112.4**	90	444	4.9	16	3	49	293	8	**3**
2021	HOU	0	0	—	DNP																	
2022	CLE	6	6	3–3	99	170	58.2	1,102	6.5	46	7	5	79.1	36	175	4.9	21	1	20	106	1	0
2023	CLE	6	6	5–1	105	171	61.4	1,115	6.5	59	7	4	84.3	26	142	5.5	16	1	17	85	5	2
2024	CLE	7	7	1–6	137	216	63.4	1,148	5.3	35	5	3	79.0	31	148	4.8	16	1	33	191	5	**3**
2025	CLE	0	0	—	DNP																	
2026	CLE	9	9	6–3	188	289	65.1	2,118	7.3	60	7	4	89.1	59	266	4.5	21	2	37	206	8	0
Career		82	81	43–38	1,715	2,594	66.1	20,022	7.7	77	130	52	97.7	459	2,408	5.2	49	22	281	1,638	49	15

==== Postseason ====
Year	Team	Games			Passing									Rushing					Sacks		Fumbles	
Year	Team	GP	GS	Record	Cmp	Att	Pct	Yds	Avg	Lng	TD	Int	Rtg	Att	Yds	Avg	Lng	TD	Sck	SckY	Fum	Lost
2018	HOU	1	1	0–1	29	49	59.2	235	4.8	20	1	**1**	69.7	8	76	**9.5**	**21**	0	3	18	0	0
2019	HOU	2	2	**1–1**	**51**	**77**	**66.2**	**635**	**8.2**	**54**	**3**	0	**104.6**	**20**	**92**	4.6	20	**2**	**11**	**54**	**1**	0
2023	CLE	0	0	—	Did not play due to injury																	
Career		3	3	1–2	80	126	63.5	870	6.9	54	4	1	91.0	28	168	6.0	21	2	14	72	1	0

=== College ===
Season	Team	Games			Passing								Rushing			
Season	Team	GP	GS	Record	Comp	Att	Pct	Yards	Avg	TD	Int	Rate	Att	Yards	Avg	TD
2014	Clemson	8	5	4−1	93	137	**67.9**	1,466	**10.7**	14	2	**188.6**	63	200	3.2	5
2015	Clemson	15	15	**14−1**	333	491	67.8	4,109	8.4	35	13	156.3	**207**	**1,105**	**5.3**	**12**
2016	Clemson	15	15	**14−1**	**388**	**579**	67.0	**4,593**	7.9	**41**	**17**	151.1	165	629	3.8	9
Career		38	35	32−3	814	1,207	67.4	10,168	8.4	90	32	157.5	435	1,934	4.4	26

== Career highlights ==
=== Awards and honors ===
NFL

- 3× Pro Bowl (2018–2020)
- NFL passing yards leader (2020)
- PFWA All-Rookie Team (2017)
- Ranked No. 50 in the NFL Top 100 Players of 2018
- Ranked No. 51 in the NFL Top 100 Players of 2019
- Ranked No. 20 in the NFL Top 100 Players of 2020
- Ranked No. 18 in the NFL Top 100 Players of 2021

College

- CFP national champion (2016)
- CFP National Championship Offensive MVP (2016)
- Johnny Unitas Golden Arm Award (2016)
- 2× Davey O'Brien Award (2015, 2016)
- 2× Manning Award (2015, 2016)
- Consensus All-American (2015)
- Second-team All-American (2016)
- 2× ACC Athlete of the Year (2016, 2017)
- ACC Player of the Year (2015)
- ACC Offensive Player of the Year (2015)
- First-team All-ACC (2015)
- Second-team All-ACC (2016)

=== Records ===
==== NFL records ====
- Most passing touchdowns in a single game by a rookie quarterback: 5 (tied with Ray Buivid, Matthew Stafford, Jameis Winston, Daniel Jones, and C. J. Stroud)
- Most passing touchdowns in a calendar month by a rookie quarterback: 16
- Most passing touchdowns by a rookie quarterback in one half: 4 (tied with Marcus Mariota and Jameis Winston) (Week 5, 2017)
- First player in NFL history to pass for 400+ yards, throw 4+ TD passes, and rush for 50+ yards in a single game. (Week 8, 2017)
- Longest streak of games with 3 or more passing touchdowns by a rookie in NFL history: 4
- Most completions with a perfect passer rating: 28
- Most attempts with a perfect passer rating: 33 (tied with Jared Goff)

==== Texans franchise records ====
- Most consecutive games with a touchdown pass: 20
- Highest passer rating in a season: 112.4
- First rookie quarterback with 3+ touchdown passes in a game
- First rookie quarterback to throw for 300+ yards
- First quarterback to score touchdowns (one passing, one rushing) in his first two games
- First quarterback to record 300+ passing yards and 40+ rushing yards in a single game (Week 3, 2017)
- Most rushing touchdowns by a quarterback: 17

== Personal life ==
Watson is a Christian. In 2006, when Watson was 11, Atlanta Falcons running back Warrick Dunn donated a home to Watson's family through Dunn's charity Homes for the Holidays, in partnership with Habitat for Humanity. In 2017, Watson donated his first NFL game check of approximately $27,000 to three NRG Stadium cafeteria employees affected by Hurricane Harvey.

== Sexual assault allegations ==
=== Allegations and lawsuits ===
On March 16, 2021, a Houston massage therapist filed a civil lawsuit delivered by attorney Tony Buzbee against Watson, claiming that Watson had touched her with the tip of his erect penis while asking her for sex during a visit to her home for treatment in March 2020. Watson vehemently denied Buzbee's claims, stating that "I have never treated any woman with anything other than the utmost respect." According to the suit, the massage therapist immediately ended the session and cried after the incident. Two additional NFL players contacted the massage therapist several weeks later on Watson's recommendation. The suit also claims that Watson later reached out to the massage therapist and apologized for his actions.

The next day, another massage therapist represented by Buzbee claimed that Watson had met her at the Houstonian Hotel in August 2020 and completely undressed and refused to cover up, directing her to massage his anus and penis and making a movement that caused her to touch his penis. The therapist also claims that Watson had only paid half of the charges due for her services.

On March 18, a third civil lawsuit was filed against Watson, alleging that he had forced a massage therapist to perform oral sex on him before she blacked out in an office building in December 2020. The therapist claims that after Watson left, she was shaken and defecated on herself. Also, on March 18, the NFL announced that it would investigate the sexual assault allegations made against Watson.

On March 19, Buzbee claimed that nine more civil suits had been filed against Watson (for a total of 12) and that 22 women contacted his office regarding Watson's conduct while receiving massages. Buzbee requested that the Houston Police Department and the Harris County, Texas, district attorney investigate the situation and pursue criminal charges against Watson. One of the nine new civil suits alleges that Watson attempted to kiss a woman forcibly, and another suit alleges that he had attempted to assault the same woman on two separate occasions.

On March 22, a 14th lawsuit was filed by a woman who called Watson a "serial predator". The incident allegedly occurred in California, just the second of the 14 allegations to occur outside the Houston area. The traveling massage therapist alleged that when she arrived at the address that Watson had provided, he led her to a room and "locked the doors behind him". After Watson allegedly "forced Plaintiff's hand onto his penis" during the massage, he allegedly told her, "I will not have you sign an NDA, but don't ever talk about this." The plaintiff also alleges that Watson reached out on Instagram in December, "acting as if nothing had happened".

By April 5, 22 lawsuits were filed against Watson. 18 professional massage therapists have since expressed support of his character, saying that the allegations contradict their experiences with Watson.

Tony Buzbee has stated that he was hesitant to send evidence to the Houston Police Department because Watson's lawyer Rusty Hardin has a son in the police force, instead alleging to send evidence from his clients "elsewhere" while also criticizing outgoing HPD chief Art Acevedo. Hardin and Acevedo have since criticized Buzbee's statements, with Hardin saying that he and his client would "always remain available to any law enforcement or regulatory agency who desires our cooperation". On April 2, the HPD announced an investigation of Watson after a complainant filed an official report.

On April 6, two of the 22 women who had filed lawsuits against Watson publicly identified themselves at a press conference. Ashley Solis, the first of the women to identify herself, claimed that during a massage appointment at her home, Watson exposed himself and touched her hand with his erect penis before she ended the session and asked him to leave. At a press conference, Solis said that she has panic attacks, anxiety and depression resulting from the sexual assault. She stated: "People say that I'm doing this just for money. That is false. I come forward now so that Deshaun Watson does not assault another woman."

On April 9, Hardin claimed that some of Watson's massages did lead to some "sexual activity" but that it was consensual. That same day, two judges ruled that 13 of the 22 lawsuits must be refiled within two business days or risk dismissal and that four of the accusers must refile using their current names. Attorneys announced that 9 of the 12 women would reveal their names voluntarily. The judge granted Watson's attorneys' emergency motion requiring the release of the other accusers' names.

On September 9, 2024, Watson was sued for sexual assault and battery by a new accuser in Houston, who alleged that Watson penetrated her vagina without consent in several positions during a date in 2020.

=== Aftermath ===
On April 7, 2021, Nike and Beats by Dre suspended endorsement deals with Watson. Reliant Energy and H-E-B stated that they did not plan on engaging with Watson in the future.

On March 11, 2022, a grand jury declined to indict Watson on criminal charges related to "harassment and sexual misconduct". On that date he still faced 22 civil lawsuits, many alleging sexual misconduct, and assault. As of August 1, 2022, all but one of the pending civil cases had been settled.

As a result of these accusations, the NFL announced on August 18, 2022, that Watson would be suspended for 11 games, pay a record $5 million fine, undergo evaluation by behavioral experts, and complete a treatment program. His fine and an additional $2 million will be donated to agencies that work to prevent sexual assault.
