= Manning Award =

American football award for college quarterbacks

- Awarded for: The collegiate American football quarterback adjudged to be the best in the United States
- Country: United States
- Presented by: Sugar Bowl Committee

History
- First winner: Matt Leinart
- Most wins: Deshaun Watson (2)
- Most recent: Fernando Mendoza, Indiana
- Website: allstatesugarbowl.org/sports/2022/4/7/manning-award.aspx

The Manning Award has been presented annually since the 2004 football season to the collegiate American football quarterback as judged by the Sugar Bowl Committee to be the best in the United States. It is the only quarterback award that includes each candidate's postseason-bowl performance in its balloting.

The award is named in honor of former University of Mississippi (Ole Miss) quarterback Archie Manning and his quarterback sons Peyton and Eli. Archie was also the quarterback for the New Orleans Saints, Houston Oilers, and Minnesota Vikings of the National Football League (NFL). Peyton was a star quarterback at the University of Tennessee as well as with the Indianapolis Colts and Denver Broncos of the NFL. Eli was also a star quarterback at Ole Miss and was the quarterback of the NFL's New York Giants. Both Peyton and Eli were All-America selections during their college careers and both led their respective professional teams to 2 Super Bowl championships (Peyton with the Indianapolis Colts in Super Bowl XLI and with the Broncos in Super Bowl 50, and Eli with the New York Giants in Super Bowls XLII and XLVI). Both won the Super Bowl MVP award, Eli twice. Archie was inducted into the College Football Hall of Fame in 1989.

Each of the award winners has gone on to be selected in the first round of the NFL draft, except Colt McCoy, who won the award following the 2009 season and was a third-round selection, and Stetson Bennett, who went in the 4th round. Deshaun Watson is the only player to win the award twice, for the 2015 and 2016 seasons.

== Winners ==
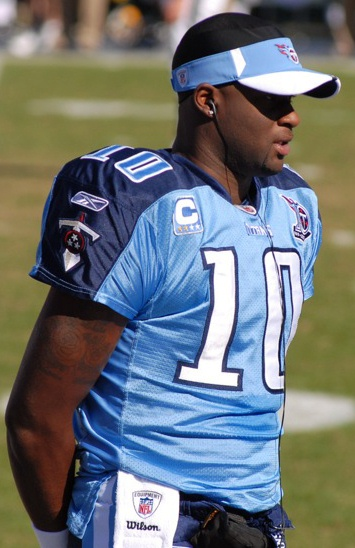
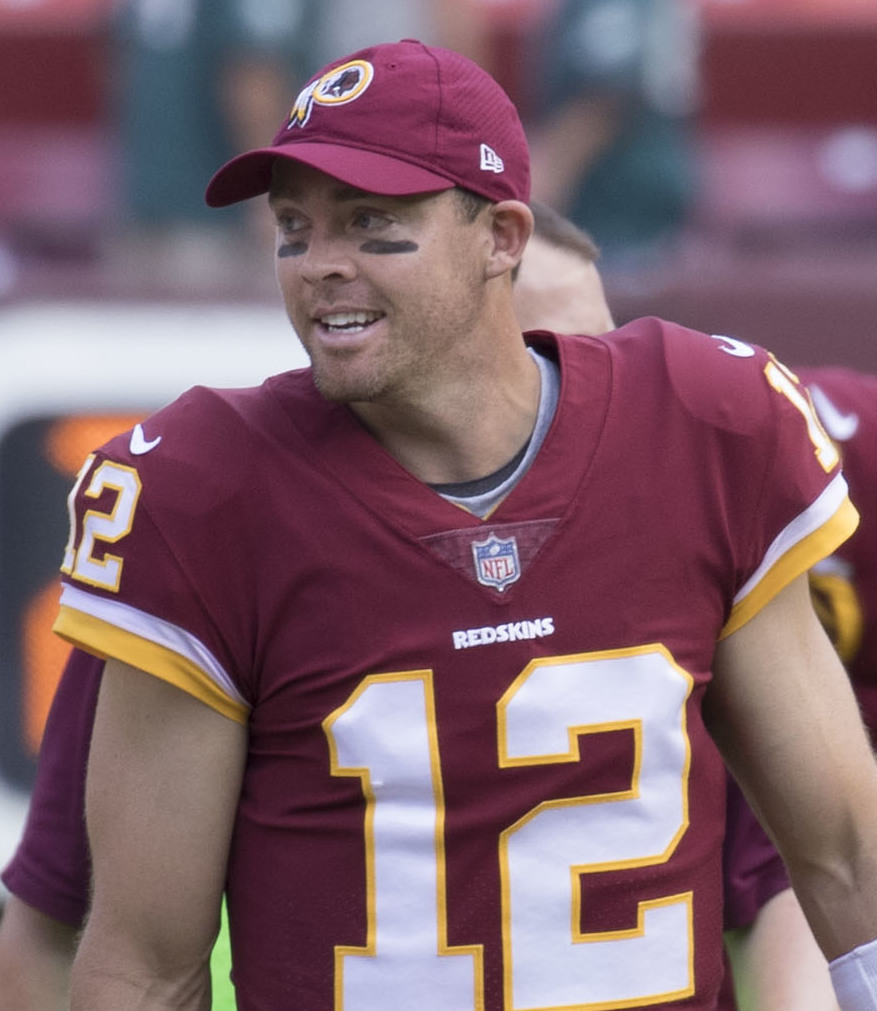
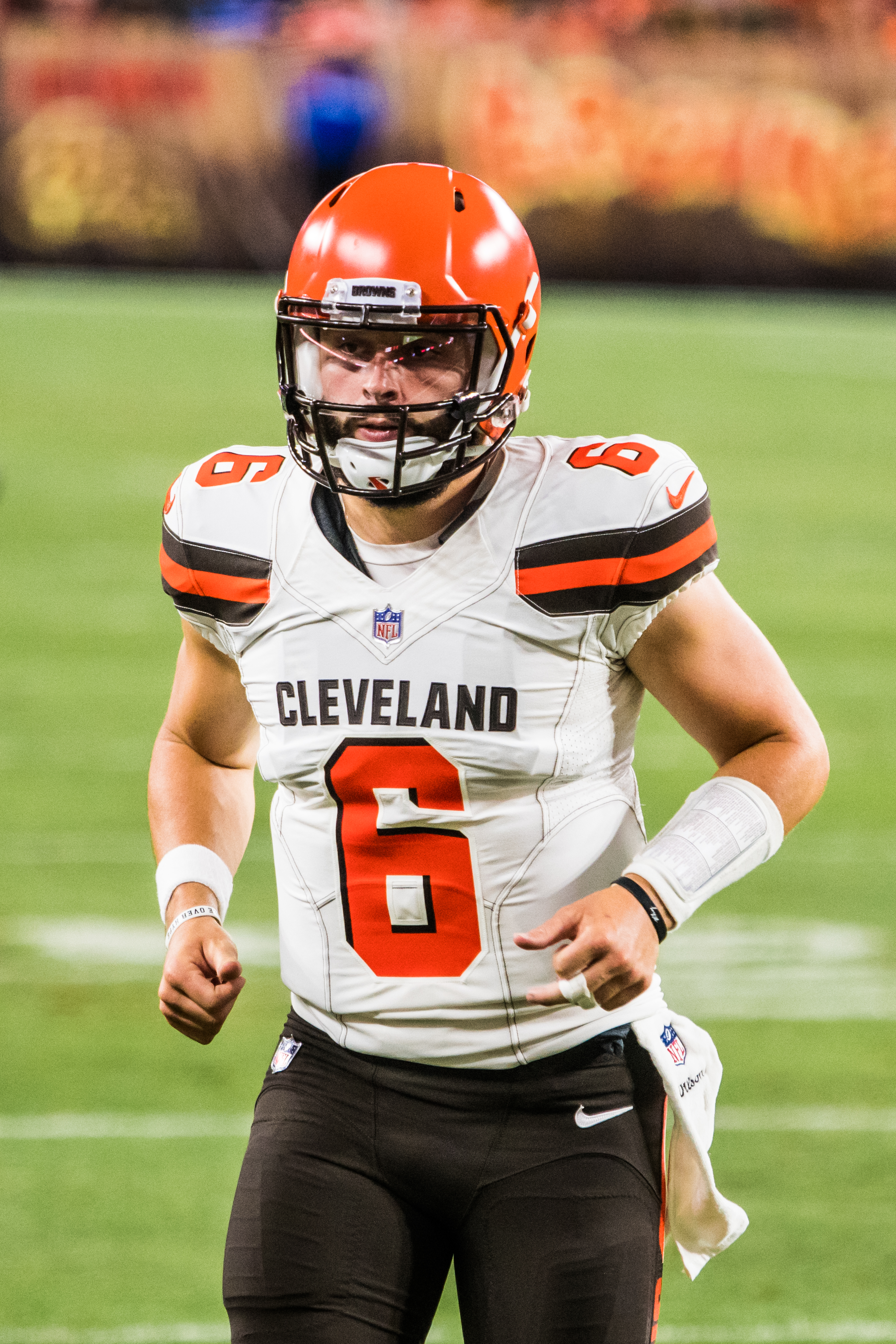
Winners (from left) Vince Young, Colt McCoy, and Baker Mayfield

Season	Player	Team	Ref.
2004	Matt Leinart	USC	
2005	Vince Young	Texas	
2006	JaMarcus Russell	LSU	
2007	Matt Ryan	Boston College	
2008	Tim Tebow	Florida	
2009	Colt McCoy	Texas (2)	
2010	Cam Newton	Auburn	
2011	Robert Griffin III	Baylor	
2012	Johnny Manziel	Texas A&M	
2013	Jameis Winston	Florida State	
2014	Marcus Mariota	Oregon	
2015	Deshaun Watson	Clemson	
2016	Deshaun Watson (2)	Clemson (2)	
2017	Baker Mayfield	Oklahoma	
2018	Kyler Murray	Oklahoma (2)	
2019	Joe Burrow	LSU (2)	
2020	Mac Jones	Alabama	
2021	Bryce Young	Alabama (2)	
2022	Stetson Bennett	Georgia	
2023	Jayden Daniels	LSU (3)	
2024	Cam Ward	Miami (FL)	
2025	Fernando Mendoza	Indiana	
