= Van Smith (American football) =

American football player (born 1996)

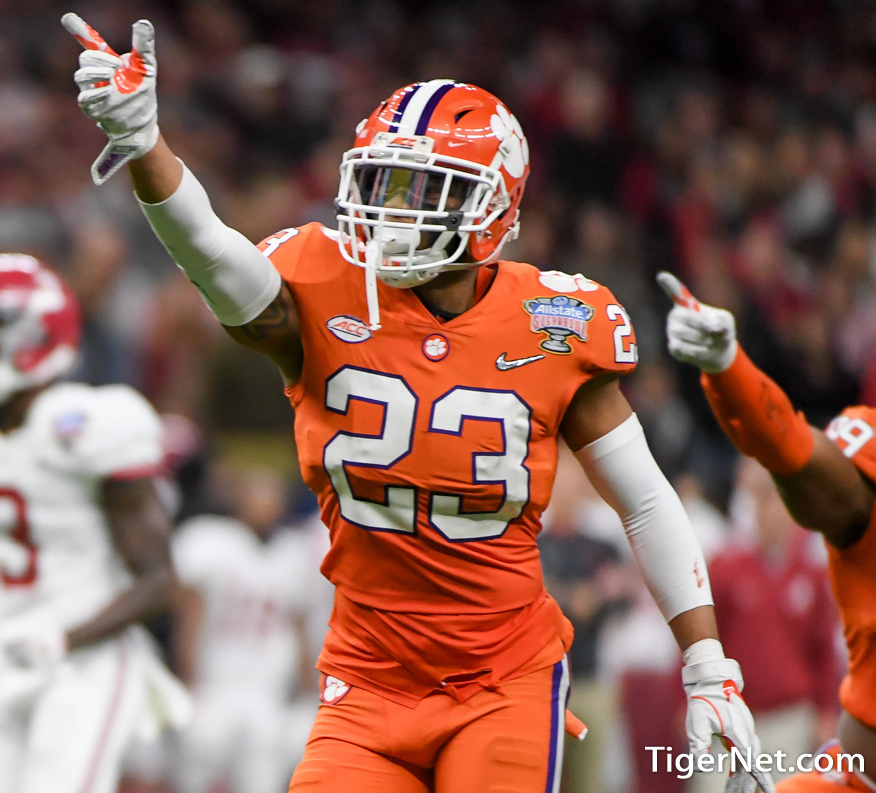

Profile
- Position: Safety

Personal information
- Born: August 14, 1996 (age 30); Charlotte, North Carolina, U.S.
- Listed height: 5 ft 11 in (1.80 m)
- Listed weight: 185 lb (84 kg)

Career information
- High school: Hough (Cornelius, North Carolina)
- College: Clemson (2015–2017)
- NFL draft: 2018: undrafted

Career history
- Atlanta Legends (2019)*
- * Offseason or practice squad member only

Awards and highlights
- CFP national champion (2016)
- Stats at Pro Football Reference

Van Smith (born August 14, 1996) is an American former football safety. He played college football at Clemson.

== Early life ==
Smith attended Hough High School in Cornelius, North Carolina. In high school, he played on both offense and defense. Offensively as a senior he carried the ball 66 times for 444 yards and 13 touchdowns along with returning two kickoffs for touchdowns. Defensively as a senior he tallied 74 tackles and six interceptions. He committed to play football for the Clemson Tigers on August 31, 2013, choosing the Tigers over the likes of Penn State, Michigan, Duke, and several others.

== College career ==
As a true freshman in 2015, Smith played in 14 games, posting 19 tackles with one interception.

In 2016, as a sophomore, Smith started all 15 of the Tigers' games. He tallied 95 tackles, 5.5 tackles for loss, two interceptions, two forced fumbles and two pass deflections.

As a junior in 2017, Smith played in 13 of Clemson's 14 games, missing one due to a knee injury. In 13 games, he had 49 tackles, one interception, and one pass breakup. After the season, Smith declared for the 2018 NFL draft.

== Professional career ==
Smith signed with the Atlanta Legends of the Alliance of American Football, but failed to make the final roster.
