= Hunter Renfrow =

American football player (born 1995)

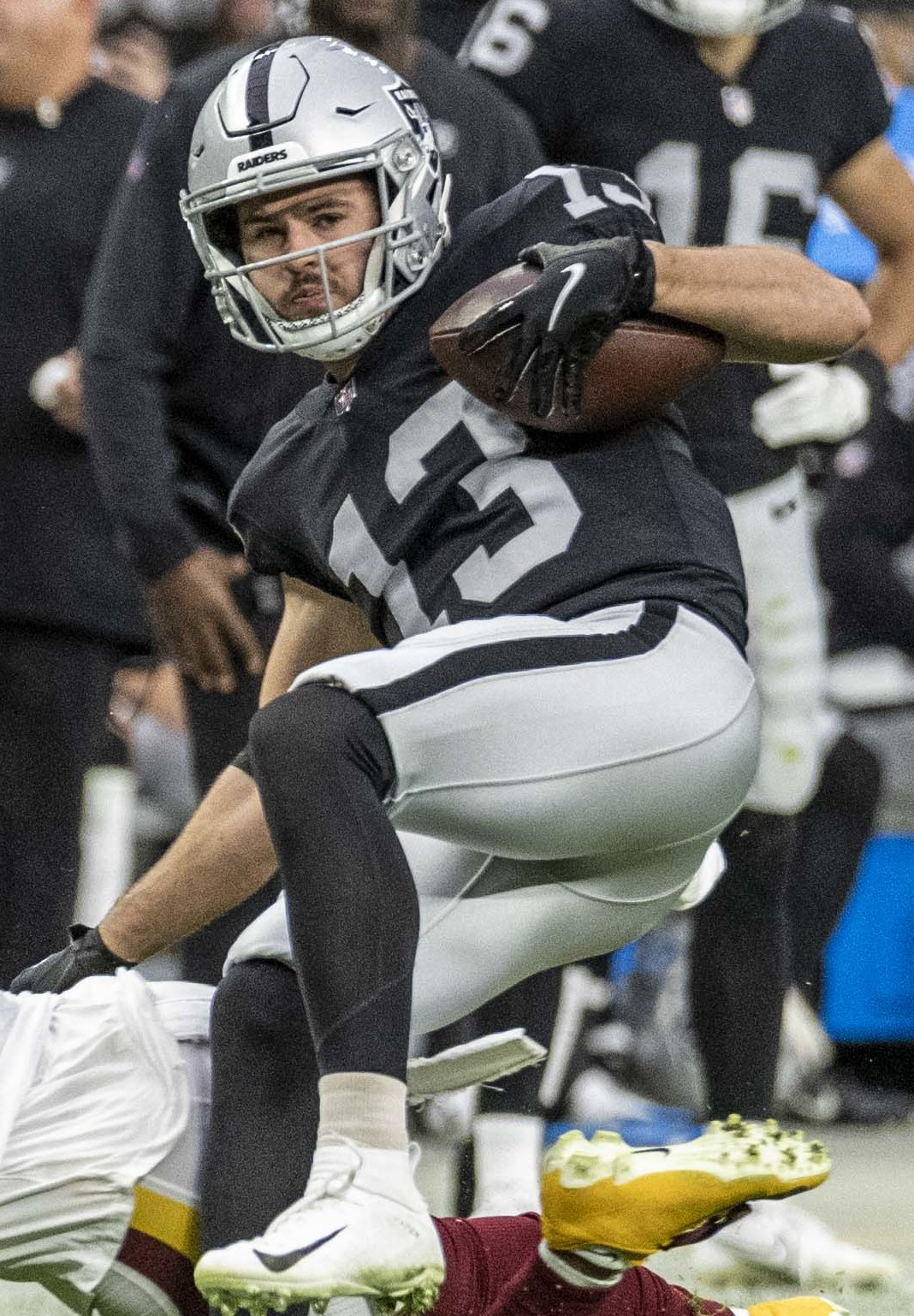
- Renfrow with the Las Vegas Raiders in 2021

Profile
- Position: Wide receiver

Personal information
- Born: December 21, 1995 (age 30); Myrtle Beach, South Carolina, U.S.
- Listed height: 5 ft 10 in (1.78 m)
- Listed weight: 185 lb (84 kg)

Career information
- High school: Socastee (Myrtle Beach)
- College: Clemson (2014–2018)
- NFL draft: 2019: 5th round, 149th overall pick

Career history
- Oakland / Las Vegas Raiders (2019–2023); Carolina Panthers (2025)

Awards and highlights
- Pro Bowl (2021); 2× CFP national champion (2016, 2018); Burlsworth Trophy (2018); 2× Third-team All-ACC (2017, 2018)

Career NFL statistics as of 2025
- Receptions: 284
- Receiving yards: 2,973
- Receiving touchdowns: 19
- Return yards: 693
- Stats at Pro Football Reference

James Hunter Renfrow (born December 21, 1995) is an American professional football wide receiver. He played college football for the Clemson Tigers, winning two national championships before being selected by the Las Vegas Raiders in the fifth round of the 2019 NFL draft.

== Early life ==
Renfrow attended Socastee High School in Myrtle Beach, South Carolina, where his father, Tim, was the football coach. He played quarterback for Socastee's football team and was rated by Rivals.com as a two-star recruit. He received offers from Appalachian State, Gardner-Webb, Presbyterian, and Wofford, where his father played.

== College career ==
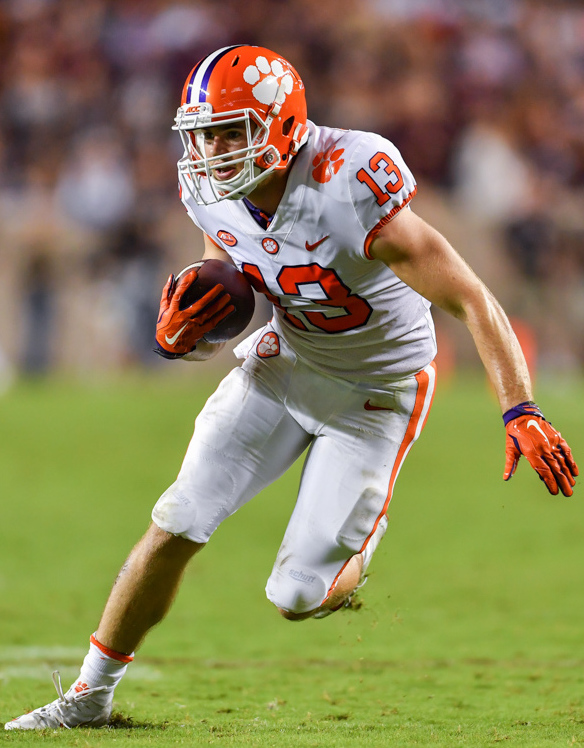
Renfrow with Clemson in 2018

Despite receiving scholarship offers to play football and baseball at schools in the Football Championship Subdivision (FCS), Renfrow enrolled at Clemson University, and walked on to the Clemson Tigers football team. He was 5 feet 10 inches (1.78 m) and weighed only 155 pounds (70 kg). He took a redshirt in 2014. By 2015, when he had increased to 176 pounds (80 kg), he received a scholarship. Renfrow played in all 13 games as a redshirt freshman in 2015, making ten starts, and recording 492 yards and five touchdowns. He caught two touchdown passes in the 2016 College Football Playoff National Championship. In 2016, Renfrow played in just nine games as a sophomore due to injury. He recorded 353 yards and caught four touchdown passes. In the 2017 College Football Playoff National Championship against the Alabama Crimson Tide, he caught the game-winning touchdown from quarterback Deshaun Watson with one second remaining in the game.

In 2018, Renfrow won the Burlsworth Trophy, given to the best college player who began his career as a walk-on. In his final collegiate season in 2018, his receiving total declined slightly, as he recorded 49 receptions for 544 receiving yards and one receiving touchdown. However, he would help Clemson win its second national championship in three years.

== Professional career ==
Pre-draft measurables
Height	Weight	Arm length	Hand span	Wingspan	40-yard dash	10-yard split	20-yard split	20-yard shuttle	Three-cone drill	Vertical jump	Broad jump	Bench press
5 ft 10 1/4 in (1.78 m)	184 lb (83 kg)	29 1/8 in (0.74 m)	7 7/8 in (0.20 m)	5 ft 10 3/4 in (1.80 m)	4.59 s	1.64 s	2.69 s	4.19 s	6.80 s	35.0 in (0.89 m)	9 ft 8 in (2.95 m)	7 reps
All values from 2019 NFL Combine

=== Oakland/Las Vegas Raiders ===
==== 2019 ====
Renfrow was selected by the Oakland Raiders with the 149th overall pick in the fifth round of the 2019 NFL draft, the 17th of 28 wide receivers, one of three Clemson players taken by the Raiders, and the only offensive player drafted from the National Championship team.

Renfrow was listed as a starting wide receiver on the Raiders' depth chart since the first release. Renfrow made his NFL debut in Week 1 against the Denver Broncos on Monday Night Football, with two catches for 13 yards in the 24–16 win. In Week 8 against the Houston Texans, Renfrow caught four passes for 88 yards including a 65-yard touchdown reception, the first of his career in the 27–24 loss. In Week 12 against the New York Jets, Renfrow caught three passes for 31 yards before exiting the game due to a rib injury in the third quarter. After the game, Raiders' head coach Jon Gruden said that Renfrow broke a rib and punctured a lung which could force him to miss the rest of the season. Renfrow returned from injury in Week 16 against the Los Angeles Chargers. During the game, Renfrow caught seven passes for 107 yards and a touchdown during the 24–17 win. In the following week's game against the Broncos, Renfrow caught six passes for 102 yards and a touchdown during the 16–15 loss. Overall, Renfrow finished the 2019 season with 49 receptions for 605 receiving yards and four receiving touchdowns.

==== 2020 ====
Renfrow was fined US$15,000 by the NFL on October 5, 2020, for attending a maskless charity event hosted by teammate Darren Waller during the COVID-19 pandemic in violation of the NFL's COVID-19 protocols for the 2020 season. In 2020, Renfrow played in 16 games, started 6, and caught 56 passes for 656 yards, as well as scoring two touchdowns.

==== 2021 ====
In Week 12, Renfrow had 8 receptions for 134 yards in a 36–33 win over the Dallas Cowboys. In Week 13, Renfrow had 9 receptions for 102 yards in a 17–15 loss against the Washington Football Team. In Week 14, Renfrow had 13 receptions for 117 yards and a 4-yard touchdown pass from Derek Carr in a 48–9 loss to the Kansas City Chiefs. Overall, Renfrow finished the 2021 regular season setting a career high in receptions (103), receiving yards (1,038) and receiving touchdowns (9). He was named as a Pro Bowler.

Renfrow made his playoff debut in the Wild Card Round against the Cincinnati Bengals, catching eight passes for 58 yards in the 26–19 loss.

==== 2022 ====
On June 10, 2022, Renfrow signed a two-year, $32 million contract extension with the Las Vegas Raiders. In Week 2 against the Arizona Cardinals, Renfrow had seven catches for 59 yards, but fumbled twice with one recovered and returned for a touchdown by Byron Murphy in overtime in the 23–29 loss. Renfrow also suffered a concussion after being hit by Isaiah Simmons during the play that caused the fumble. He was placed on injured reserve on November 10, and activated on December 17. Renfrow finished the 2022 season with 36 receptions for 330 receiving yards and two receiving touchdowns in ten games.

==== 2023 ====
Renfrow had 25 receptions for 255 yards in the 2023 season.

On March 13, 2024, Renfrow was released by the Raiders.

=== Carolina Panthers ===
On April 27, 2025, Renfrow signed with the Carolina Panthers after a one-year absence in the NFL. Despite a strong training camp, he was released on August 26. On August 30, Renfrow re-signed with the Panthers. In Week 2 against the Arizona Cardinals, Renfrow logged seven receptions for 48 yards and two touchdowns. In six appearances (two starts) for Carolina, he recorded 15 receptions for 89 yards and two touchdowns. Renfrow was waived by the Panthers on January 6, 2026.

== Career statistics ==
=== NFL ===
==== Regular season ====
Year	Team	Games		Receiving					Rushing					Fumbles	
Year	Team	GP	GS	Rec	Yds	Avg	Lng	TD	Att	Yds	Avg	Lng	TD	Fum	Lost
2019	OAK	13	4	49	605	12.3	65	4	–	–	–	–	–	1	0
2020	LV	16	6	56	656	11.7	53	2	–	–	–	–	–	2	1
2021	LV	17	9	103	1,038	10.1	54	9	3	3	1.0	5	0	5	1
2022	LV	10	1	36	330	9.2	27	2	–	–	–	–	–	3	1
2023	LV	17	3	25	255	10.2	38	0	–	–	–	–	–	1	1
2025	CAR	6	2	15	89	5.9	15	2	–	–	–	–	–	0	0
Career		79	25	284	2,973	10.5	65	19	3	3	1.0	5	0	12	4

==== Postseason ====
Year	Team	Games		Receiving					Fumbles	
Year	Team	GP	GS	Rec	Yds	Avg	Lng	TD	Fum	Lost
2021	LV	1	0	8	58	7.3	16	0	1	0
Career		1	0	8	58	7.3	16	0	1	0

=== College ===
Season	Team	GP	Rec	Yds	Avg	TD
2015	Clemson	13	33	492	14.9	5
2016	Clemson	11	44	495	11.3	6
2017	Clemson	14	60	602	10.0	3
2018	Clemson	15	49	544	11.1	1
Career		53	186	2,133	11.5	15

== Personal life ==
Renfrow married his high school sweetheart, Camilla, on April 13, 2019, in DeBordieu, South Carolina. They have two daughters together.

Renfrow is a Christian. Renfrow has said “We’re trying to win every game but at the end of the day, that's ultimately what matters, what your relationship is with Christ. Whenever football is long and gone and 100 years from now, [God will] still be there and that's kind of driven me.”
