= Ben Boulware =

American football player (born 1994)

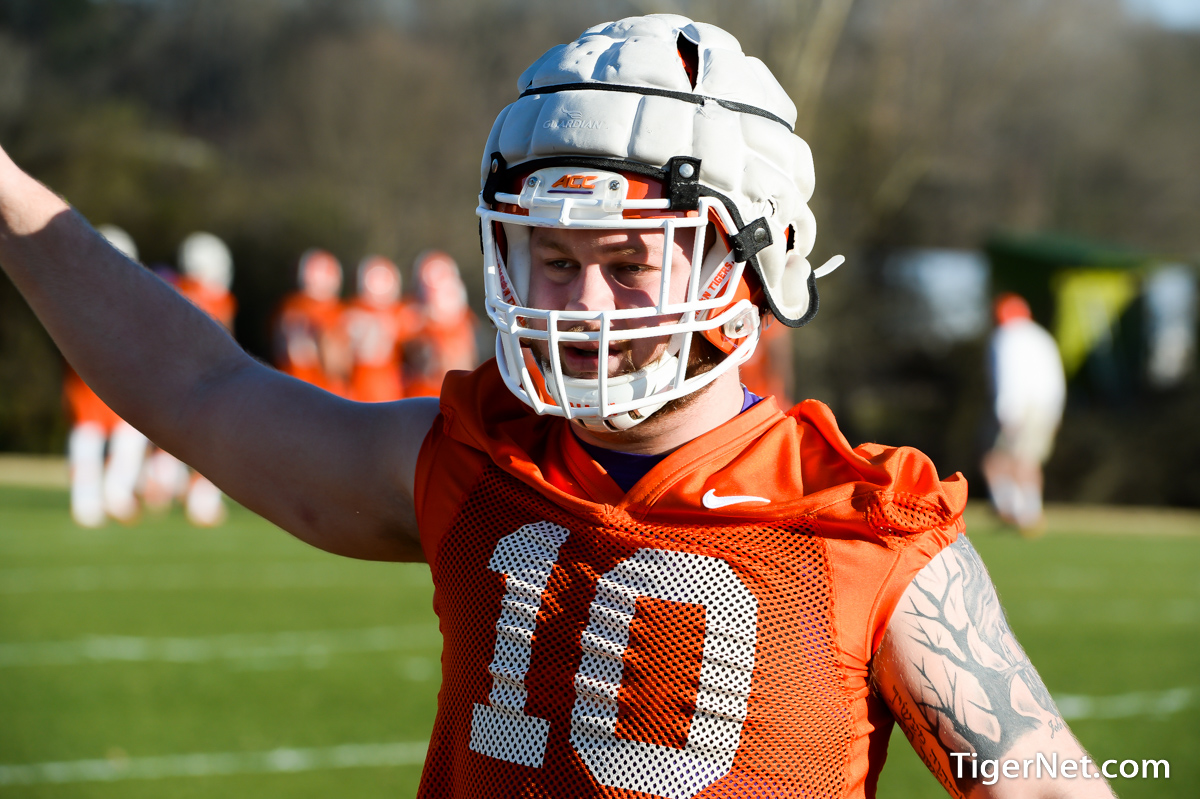

Clemson Tigers
- Title: Linebackers coach

Personal information
- Born: August 7, 1994 (age 32); Anderson, South Carolina, U.S.
- Listed height: 6 ft 0 in (1.83 m)
- Listed weight: 235 lb (107 kg)

Career information
- High school: T. L. Hanna (Anderson, South Carolina)
- College: Clemson
- NFL draft: 2017: undrafted

Career history

Playing
- Carolina Panthers (2017)*; San Francisco 49ers (2017)*
- * Offseason or practice squad member only

Coaching
- Clemson (2024) Defensive intern; Clemson (2025–present) Linebackers coach

Awards and highlights
- CFP national champion (2016); CFP National Championship Game Defensive MVP (2017); Jack Lambert Trophy (2016); ACC Co-Defensive Player of the Year (2016); First-team All-ACC (2016); Second-team All-ACC (2015)
- Stats at Pro Football Reference

Benjamin James Boulware (born August 7, 1994) is an American former football linebacker who is currently the linebackers coach at Clemson University. He played college football at Clemson where he was the 2016 ACC Co-Defensive Player of the Year and the defensive MVP of the 2017 College Football Playoff National Championship.

== College career ==
On December 7, 2016, Boulware was awarded the Jack Lambert Trophy, for best linebacker. He was the Defensive MVP of the 2017 College Football Playoff National Championship. Boulware was part of the Clemson team that defeated top-ranked Alabama in the 2017 College Football Playoff National Championship by a score of 35–31. In the game, he recorded six total tackles and one pass defended.

=== College statistics ===
Year	Team	Class	GP	Tackles					Interceptions					Fumbles	
Year	Team	Class	GP	Solo	Ast	Tot	Loss	Sk	Int	Yds	Avg	TD	PD	FF	FR
2013	Clemson	FR	5	12	9	21	1.5	0.0	1	1	1.0	0	0	0	0
2014	Clemson	SO	12	29	14	43	6.0	1.0	1	47	47.0	1	1	2	1
2015	Clemson	JR	15	45	36	81	7.5	3.0	2	15	7.5	0	7	1	3
2016	Clemson	SR	14	58	58	116	11.5	4.0	1	0	0.0	0	2	1	3
Career			46	144	117	261	26.5	8.0	5	63	12.6	1	10	4	7

== Professional career ==
Pre-draft measurables
Height	Weight	Arm length	Hand span	Wingspan	40-yard dash	10-yard split	20-yard split	20-yard shuttle	Three-cone drill	Vertical jump	Broad jump	Bench press
6 ft 0 in (1.83 m)	238 lb (108 kg)	30 1/2 in (0.77 m)	10 in (0.25 m)	6 ft 2 3/4 in (1.90 m)	4.85 s	1.76 s	2.86 s	4.43 s	7.02 s	29.5 in (0.75 m)	9 ft 3 in (2.82 m)	20 reps
All values from NFL Combine/Pro Day

=== Carolina Panthers ===
Boulware signed with the Carolina Panthers as an undrafted free agent following the 2017 NFL draft. He was released by the team on September 2, 2017.

=== San Francisco 49ers ===
Boulware was signed to the San Francisco 49ers' practice squad on September 5, 2017. He was released from the team's practice squad on September 12.
