= 2017 College Football Playoff National Championship =

2017 College Football Playoff National Championship presented by AT&T
- 3rd College Football Playoff National Championship
Clemson Tigers	Alabama Crimson Tide
(13–1)	(14–0)
ACC	SEC
35	31
Head coach: Dabo Swinney	Head coach: Nick Saban
AP / Coaches / CFP; 3 / 3 / 2	AP / Coaches / CFP; 1 / 1 / 1
	1	2	3	4	Total
Clemson	0	7	7	21	35
Alabama	7	7	10	7	31
- Date: January 9, 2017
- Season: 2016
- Stadium: Raymond James Stadium
- Location: Tampa, Florida
- MVP: Deshaun Watson (Clemson, QB); Ben Boulware (Clemson, LB)
- Favorite: Alabama by 6½
- National anthem: Little Big Town
- Referee: Mike Defee (Big 12)
- Halftime show: Clemson University Tiger Band; Million Dollar Band
- Attendance: 74,512

United States TV coverage
- Network: ESPN and ESPN Radio
- Announcers: Chris Fowler (play-by-play); Kirk Herbstreit (analyst); Samantha Ponder and Tom Rinaldi (sideline) (ESPN); Sean McDonough, Todd Blackledge, Holly Rowe and Ian Fitzsimmons (ESPN Radio)
- Nielsen ratings: 15.3 (26.03 million viewers)

International TV coverage
- Network: ESPN Deportes; ESPN Deportes Radio
- Announcers: Eduardo Varela and Pablo Virugela (ESPN Deportes); Kenneth Garay and Sebastian M. Christensen (ESPN Deportes Radio)

The 2017 College Football Playoff National Championship was a college football bowl game that was played on January 9, 2017, at Raymond James Stadium in Tampa, Florida. The third College Football Playoff National Championship, the game determined a national champion for the NCAA Division I Football Bowl Subdivision (FBS) for the 2016 season. It was the culminating game of the 2016–17 bowl season. Sponsored by telecommunications company AT&T, the game was officially known as the 2017 College Football Playoff National Championship presented by AT&T.

The game was played between the winners of two pre-designated bowl games played on December 31, 2016: the Clemson Tigers, who defeated the Ohio State Buckeyes in the Fiesta Bowl, and the defending national champion Alabama Crimson Tide, who defeated the Washington Huskies in the Peach Bowl. Having met in the previous year's championship game, the resulting title game between Clemson and Alabama became college football's first rematch between #1 and #2 in national championship game history.

The Tigers won the game 35–31 on a go-ahead touchdown with one second left, having come back from a 14–0 deficit earlier in the game. Watson threw to WR Hunter Renfrow for the game winner. Clemson quarterback and Heisman Finalist Deshaun Watson set the record for most passing yards in a championship game with 420, breaking his own record of 405 yards set in the 2016 National Championship Game. This was broken by Joe Burrow who threw for near 470 yards later on against Watson's alma mater in 2020. Deshaun Watson and Ben Boulware were named the Offensive and Defensive Most Valuable Players, respectively. It was Clemson’s first national title since 1981.

== Background ==
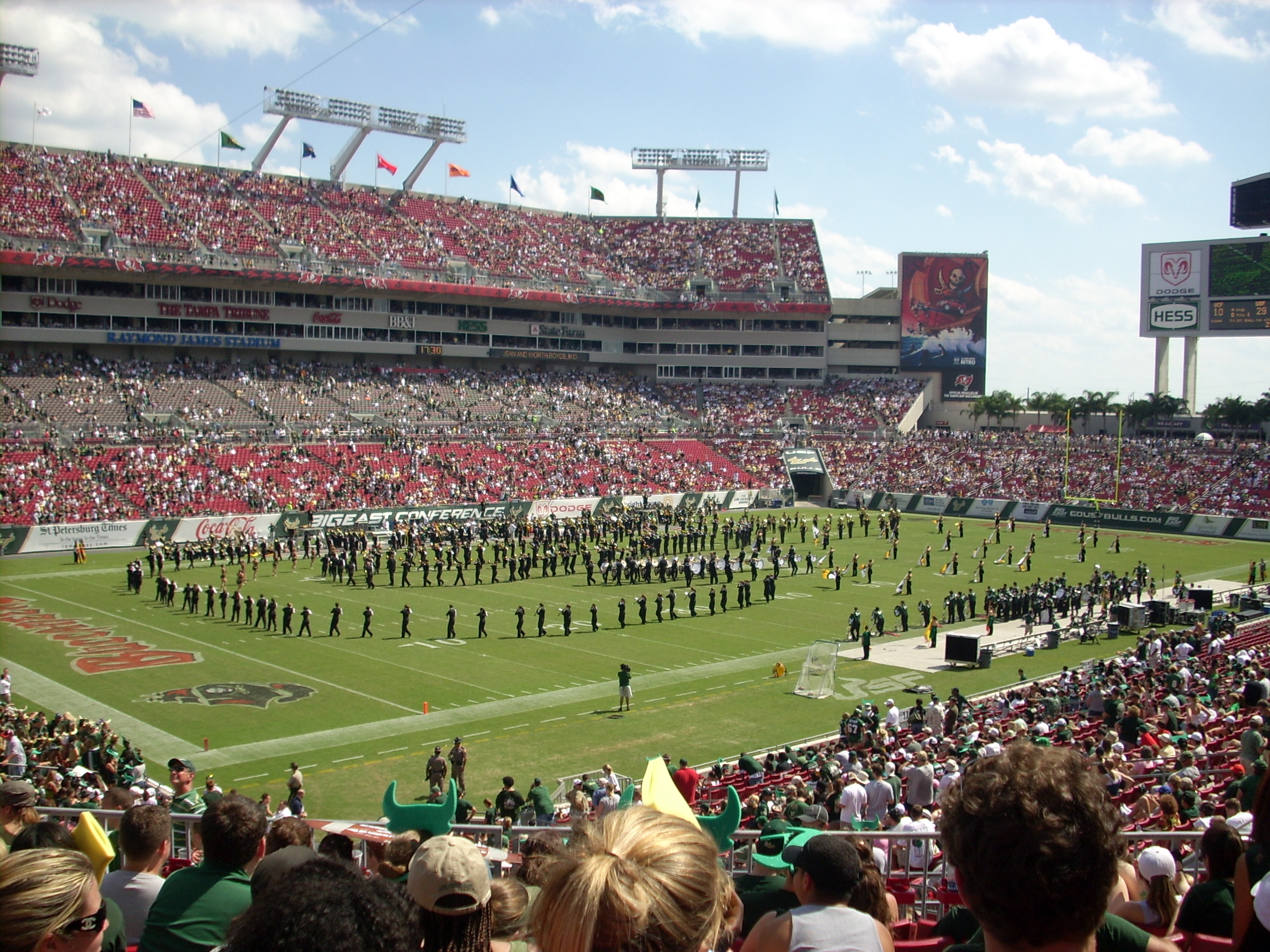
The 2017 College Football Playoff National Championship was played at Raymond James Stadium.

Competing bids were placed to host the championship game by Tampa, Jacksonville, Minneapolis, San Antonio, San Francisco, and South Florida. Raymond James Stadium in Tampa, Florida, was announced as the host site for the third College Football Playoff (CFP) National Championship game on December 17, 2013. It became the first CFP championship game to not be held at the site of one of the "New Year's Six" bowls. It also was the first CFP championship game to be played outdoors as Raymond James Stadium does not have a retractable roof. This championship game is part of the third annual CFP, constituted by four teams playing to decide the national champion of the NCAA Division I Football Bowl Subdivision. The four teams were originally selected by a 13 member-committee.

== Teams ==
The championship game was a rematch of the 2016 College Football Playoff National Championship, where Alabama defeated Clemson, 45–40, marking the first rematch between #1 and #2 in National Championship game history. Overall, the championship game marked the 17th meeting between the two schools; however, prior to the previous championship game, the programs had only met once in the regular season since 1975.

=== Alabama ===
Alabama was led by head coach Nick Saban. The Crimson Tide were undefeated in the regular season and played the Washington Huskies in the 2016 Peach Bowl, winning 24–7.

Alabama's defense was ranked first in the nation in points allowed (11.8) and yards per game (248). The defense was led by defensive back Minkah Fitzpatrick, who had six interceptions and 62 total tackles.

Jalen Hurts attempted to become the first true freshman quarterback since 1985 and only the second ever to win the National Championship.

Alabama had four AP First-Team All-Americans on its roster and entered the game as a 6.5-point favorite over Clemson.

=== Clemson ===
Clemson was led by head coach Dabo Swinney. The Tigers entered the game with a 13–1 record, with their only loss being to Pittsburgh. Clemson played the Ohio State Buckeyes in the 2016 Fiesta Bowl and won, 31–0.

On offense, the Tigers were led by quarterback Deshaun Watson, who threw for 4,173 yards, 38 touchdowns and 17 interceptions on the season. Watson was also Clemson's second-leading rusher, rushing for 586 yards and 8 touchdowns.

Clemson had two Associated Press Second-Team All-Americans and three AP Third-Team All-Americans. Clemson's cornerback Cordrea Tankersley and defensive end Christian Wilkins were First-team All-Americans with USA Today and the Football Writers Association (FWAA), respectively.

== Starting lineups ==
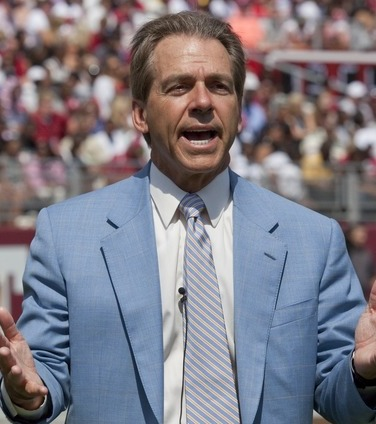
Alabama head coach Nick Saban

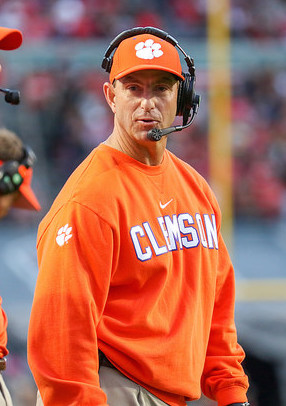
Clemson head coach Dabo Swinney

Alabama	Position		Clemson
Offense
Calvin Ridley 1	WR		Artavis Scott
Gehrig Dieter	WR		Mike Williams 1
† Cam Robinson 2	LT		Mitch Hyatt
Ross Pierschbacher 5	LG		Taylor Hearn
Bradley Bozeman 6	C		Jay Guillermo
Korren Kirven	RG		Tyrone Crowder Jr.
Jonah Williams 1	RT		Sean Pollard
O. J. Howard 1	TE		Jordan Leggett 5
ArDarius Stewart 3	WR		Hunter Renfrow 5
Jalen Hurts 2	QB		Deshaun Watson 1
Bo Scarbrough 7	RB		Wayne Gallman 4
Defense
† Jonathan Allen 1	DE		Christian Wilkins 1
Daron Payne 1	NG	DT	Carlos Watkins 4
Dalvin Tomlinson 2	DE	DT	Dexter Lawrence 1
Tony Brown	DB	DE	Clelin Ferrell 1
Ryan Anderson 2	SLB		Dorian O'Daniel 3
Rashaan Evans 1	MLB		Kendall Joseph
† Reuben Foster 1	WLB		Ben Boulware
Anthony Averett 4	CB		Cordrea Tankersley 3
Marlon Humphrey 1	CB		Ryan Carter
† Minkah Fitzpatrick 1	SS		Jadar Johnson
Ronnie Harrison 3	FS		Van Smith
† = 2016 All-American
Selected in an NFL Draft (number corresponds to draft round)

== Game summary ==
Alabama opened the game with a three-and-out, and Clemson failed to capitalize, turning the ball over on downs after failing to convert a 4th & 1. On Alabama's ensuing drive, Bo Scarbrough opened the game's scoring with a 25-yard rushing touchdown. The first quarter ended with Alabama leading Clemson, 7–0. Scarbrough scored again in the second quarter, on a 37-yard rush to increase Alabama's lead to 14–0. Clemson quarterback Deshaun Watson scored the Tigers' first touchdown of the game on an eight–yard run with six minutes left in the second quarter. The game went to halftime with Alabama leading, 14–7.

The Tigers turned the ball over on their first drive in the second half; their fumble was recovered by Ryan Anderson and returned to Clemson's 16 yard line – the Tide increased their lead to 10 after converting a 27-yard field goal. Clemson cut the lead to three with seven minutes left in the third quarter after Watson found Hunter Renfrow over the middle for a 24-yard touchdown pass. After an injury to Scarbrough, the Tide came out and scored on a 68-yard pass from Jalen Hurts to O. J. Howard on the next play; this put Alabama back up by ten points with 1:53 left in the third quarter, which ended with Alabama leading Clemson, 24–14. Clemson scored just three plays into the final quarter as Watson threw a touchdown pass to Mike Williams; this cut the lead down to 24–21. With 4:38 to go in the game, Clemson took their first lead in the game after Wayne Gallman scored on a one-yard touchdown rush; Alabama got the ball back on their own 32 yard line with 4:38 remaining in the game. The drive came to a 3rd & 16, on which Jalen Hurts found ArDarius Stewart for a 15-yard pass to set up a 4th & 1, which the Tide converted via a Damien Harris 5-yard rush. Hurts found the end zone on a 30-yard rush just a few plays later to give Alabama the lead back, 31–28.

Clemson took possession of the ball with 2:01 on the clock and the ball on their own 36 yard line. After another long catch by Mike Williams, the drive came to a 3rd & 3 on the Alabama 32 yard line, which was converted on a pass to Renfrow to the Alabama 26 yard line with 0:19 left. The next play saw Watson find Jordan Leggett on a pass down to the Tide 9 yard line with 0:14 left. Watson threw to the end zone on 1st & goal; the pass was overthrown and the clock stopped with 0:09. On 2nd & goal, Watson targeted Mike Williams, who was tripped in the end zone. The resulting pass interference call gave the Tigers 1st & goal with the ball placed on the 2-yard line with 0:06 left. On the next play, Watson threw a touchdown pass to Renfrow with 0:01 left; putting Clemson back in the lead, 35–31. After Clemson recovered an onside kick attempting to run out the clock, the game ended with a kneel-down and Clemson won the National Championship Game.

Watson, who went 36-for-56 (64%) on pass attempts for 420 yards with three passing touchdowns, and ran for 43 yards and one rushing touchdown, was named the game's Offensive Most Valuable Player. Ben Boulware, who recorded six tackles, including one for loss of yards, was named the Defensive Most Valuable Player.

=== Scoring summary ===
2017 College Football Playoff National Championship

Quarter	1	2	3	4	Total
No. 2 Clemson	0	7	7	21	35
No. 1 Alabama	7	7	10	7	31

at Raymond James Stadium • Tampa, Florida

- Date: Monday, January 9, 2017
- Game time: 8:00 p.m. EST
- Game weather: TBD
- Game attendance: 74,512
- Referee: Mike Defee (Big 12)
- TV announcers (ESPN): Chris Fowler (play-by-play), Kirk Herbstreit (analyst), Samantha Ponder and Tom Rinaldi (sidelines)
- Box score

Scoring summary

Quarter	Time	Drive			Team	Scoring information	Score	
Quarter	Time	Plays	Yards	TOP	Team	Scoring information	Clemson	Alabama
1	9:23	3	59	0:58	Alabama	Bo Scarbrough 25-yard touchdown run, Adam Griffith kick good	0	7
2	10:42	5	74	1:24	Alabama	Bo Scarbrough 37-yard touchdown run, Adam Griffith kick good	0	14
2	6:09	7	87	1:33	Clemson	Deshaun Watson 8-yard touchdown run, Greg Huegel kick good	7	14
3	12:25	4	7	1:29	Alabama	27-yard field goal by Adam Griffith	7	17
3	7:10	4	42	1:03	Clemson	Hunter Renfrow 24-yard touchdown reception from Deshaun Watson, Greg Huegel kick good	14	17
3	1:53	4	79	1:01	Alabama	O. J. Howard 68-yard touchdown reception from Jalen Hurts, Adam Griffith kick good	14	24
4	14:00	9	72	2:47	Clemson	Mike Williams 4-yard touchdown reception from Deshaun Watson, Greg Huegel kick good	21	24
4	4:38	6	88	1:55	Clemson	Wayne Gallman 1-yard touchdown run, Greg Huegel kick good	28	24
4	2:07	6	68	2:31	Alabama	Jalen Hurts 30-yard touchdown run, Adam Griffith kick good	28	31
4	0:01	9	68	2:00	Clemson	Hunter Renfrow 2-yard touchdown reception from Deshaun Watson, Greg Huegel kick good	35	31
"TOP" = time of possession. For other American football terms, see Glossary of American football.							35	31

=== Statistics ===
Statistics	Clemson	Alabama
First downs	31	16
Plays-yards	99–511	66–376
Third down efficiency	7–18	2–15
Rushes-yards	42–91	34–221
Passing yards	420	155
Passing, Comp-Att-Int	36–57–0	14–32–0
Time of possession	34:44	25:16

Team	Category	Player	Statistics
Clemson
Clemson	Passing	Deshaun Watson	36/56, 420 yds, 3 TD
Clemson	Rushing	Wayne Gallman	18 car, 46 yds, 1 TD
Clemson	Receiving	Hunter Renfrow	10 rec, 92 yds, 2 TD
Alabama
Alabama	Passing	Jalen Hurts	13/31, 131 yds, 1 TD
Alabama	Rushing	Bo Scarbrough	16 car, 93 yds, 2 TD
Alabama	Receiving	O. J. Howard	4 rec, 106 yds, 1 TD

== Broadcasting ==
The game was broadcast in the United States by ESPN, ESPN Deportes (Spanish), and ESPN Radio. In Brazil, the game was broadcast on ESPN Brazil by Everaldo Marques (play by play) and Antony Curti (color commentator). As in past years, ESPN provided Megacast coverage of the game, which supplemented coverage with analysis and additional perspectives of the game on different ESPN channels and platforms. A 30-second commercial cost up to $1 million to air.

The game had a total of 26.03 million viewers, and earned a 15.3 overnight Nielsen rating, a 4% increase from the 2016 championship game. ESPN reported that the game set records in online streaming with a 710,000 average audience, 2.41 million unique viewers, and 182.5 million overall minutes watched. However, according to USA Today "the combined overnight rating fell well short of the record for a College Football Playoff title." This became the third-highest watched game by streaming on ESPN, after two games from the FIFA World Cup.

== See also ==
- College football national championships in NCAA Division I FBS
- Alabama–Clemson football rivalry
