= Taylor Hearn (American football) =

American football player (born 1996)

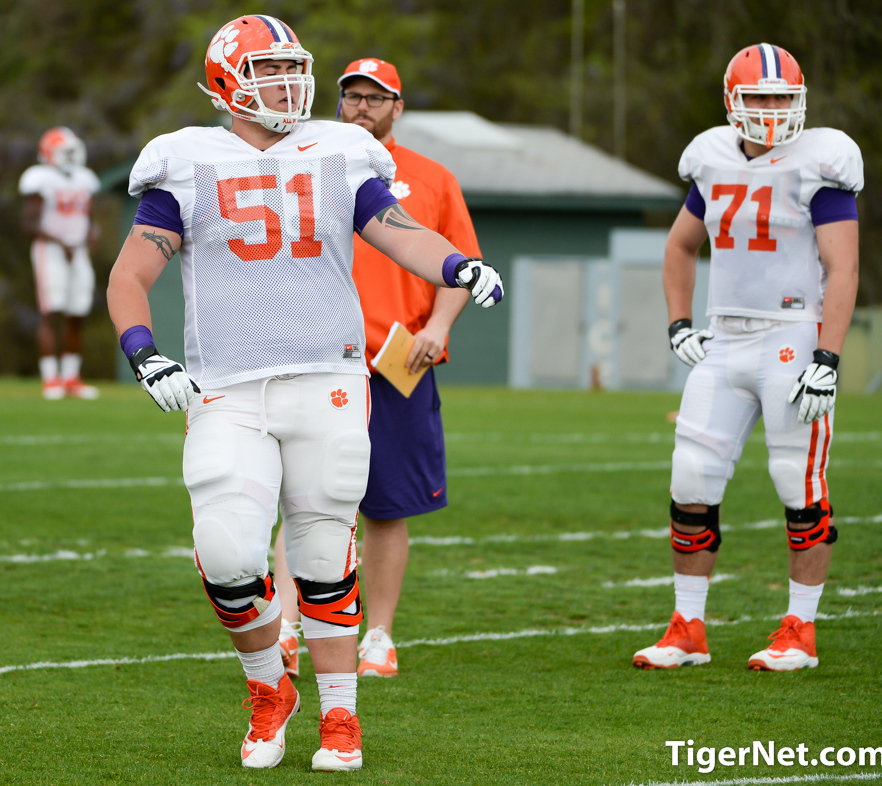

No. 62
- Position: Guard

Personal information
- Born: January 11, 1996 (age 30); Williston, South Carolina, U.S.
- Listed height: 6 ft 4 in (1.93 m)
- Listed weight: 315 lb (143 kg)

Career information
- High school: Williston-Elko
- College: Clemson
- NFL draft: 2018: undrafted

Career history
- Carolina Panthers (2018)

Awards and highlights
- CFP national champion (2016); Third-team All-ACC (2017)

Career NFL statistics
- Games played: 4
- Games started: 0
- Stats at Pro Football Reference

Taylor Hearn (born January 11, 1996) is an American former professional football player who was a guard for the Carolina Panthers of the National Football League (NFL). He played college football for the Clemson Tigers.

== Early life ==
Hearn was born and raised in Williston, South Carolina, and attended Williston-Elko High School, where he played football and baseball. He was a starter on both offensive and defensive line for the Blue Devils and served as the team's placekicker. In baseball, Hearn led Williston-Elko in both wins and home runs as a junior. Rated a three-star prospect, Hearn committed to play college football at Clemson over an offer from North Carolina.

== College career ==
Hearn spent four years at Clemson, redshirting his freshman year. He started 29 games for the Tigers, including all 15 games for the 2016 National Championship team and was named third-team All-ACC as a redshirt junior. After graduating in 2017, Hearn decided to forego his final year of eligibility and enter the 2018 NFL draft.

== Professional career ==
Hearn signed with the Carolina Panthers as an undrafted free agent April 30, 2018. He was cut by the Panthers at the end of training camp and was subsequently re–signed to the team's practice squad on September 2. Hearn was promoted to the Panthers' active roster on December 6. Hearn made his NFL debut on December 9 in a 26-20 loss to the Cleveland Browns. Hearn played in four games for the Panthers during his rookie season.

Following the season, Hearn was involved in an altercation outside a bar in Augusta, Georgia in which police were called. Hearn was not arrested and apologized for participating in the fight. He was waived by Carolina during final roster cuts on August 30, 2019.

Hearn entered the player for the 2020 XFL Draft, but went unselected.

Hearn was suspended two weeks by the NFL on December 19, 2019. He was reinstated from suspension on December 30.
