= Cordrea Tankersley =

American football player (born 1993)

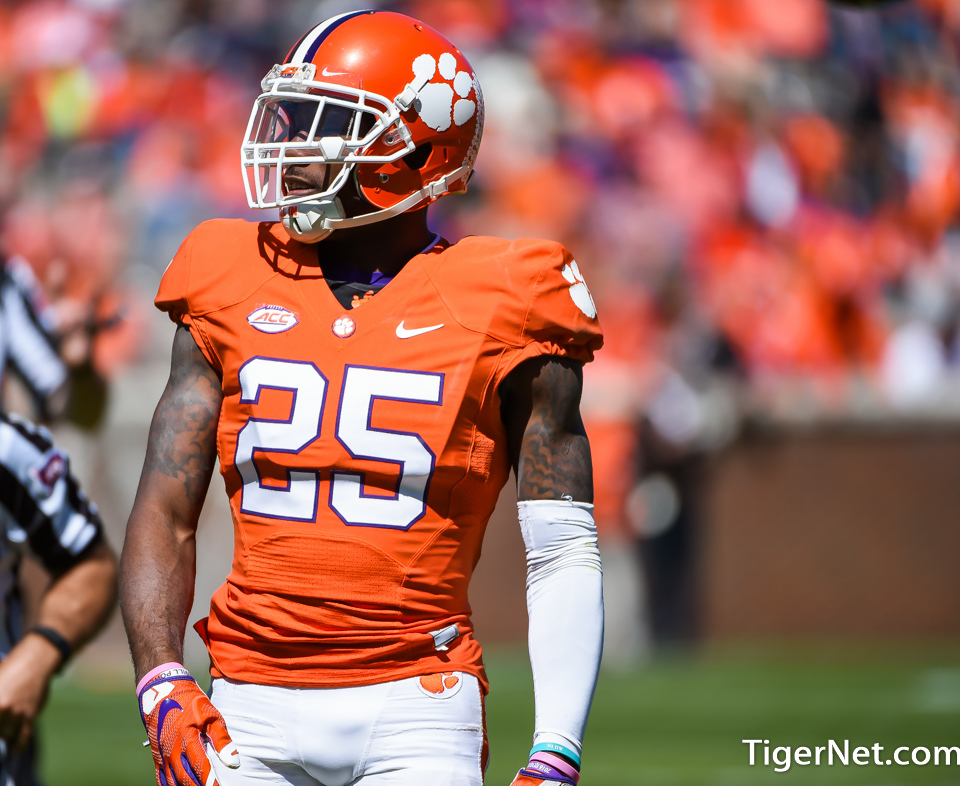
- Tankersley with the Clemson Tigers in 2016

No. 30, 23, 32
- Position: Cornerback

Personal information
- Born: November 19, 1993 (age 32); Beech Island, South Carolina, U.S.
- Listed height: 6 ft 1 in (1.85 m)
- Listed weight: 200 lb (91 kg)

Career information
- High school: Silver Bluff (Aiken, South Carolina)
- College: Clemson (2013–2016)
- NFL draft: 2017: 3rd round, 97th overall pick

Career history
- Miami Dolphins (2017–2020); Minnesota Vikings (2020)

Awards and highlights
- CFP national champion (2016); Second-team All-American (2016); First team All-ACC (2016)

Career NFL statistics
- Total tackles: 38
- Pass deflections: 7
- Stats at Pro Football Reference

Cordrea Tankersley (born November 19, 1993) is an American former professional football player who was a cornerback for the Miami Dolphins and the Minnesota Vikings of the National Football League (NFL). He played college football for the Clemson Tigers and was selected by the Dolphins in the third round of the 2017 NFL draft.

== Early life ==
Tankersley attended Silver Bluff High School in Aiken, South Carolina. He played quarterback, wide receiver and defensive back in high school. Tankersley also attended Hargrave Military Academy in 2012. He committed to Clemson University to play college football.

== College career ==
As a true freshman at Clemson in 2013, Tankersley recorded 13 tackles over 12 games. As a sophomore in 2014 he played in 13 games and had 12 tackles. Tankersley became a starter his junior year in 2015. He started all 15 games and had 60 tackles and a team-leading five interceptions. On January 9, 2017, Tankersley was part of the Clemson team that defeated top-ranked and previously undefeated Alabama in the 2017 College Football Playoff National Championship by a score of 35–31. In the game, he had five total tackles and one pass defended.

== Professional career ==
=== Pre-draft ===
Tankersley was one of 60 collegiate defensive backs to attend the NFL Scouting Combine in Indianapolis, Indiana. He completed all of the combine drills and finished fifth among all defensive backs in the 40-yard dash. On March 16, 2017, Tankersley attended Clemson's pro day, but opted to stand on his combine numbers and only performed the vertical jump (30 1/2 in, 770 mm) and positional drills. Team representatives from all 32 teams attended, including head coaches Mike Tomlin (Pittsburgh Steelers), John Fox (Chicago Bears), Mike Mularkey (Tennessee Titans), and Jim Caldwell (Detroit Lions). He attended private workouts and visits with multiple teams, including the Dallas Cowboys and Miami Dolphins. At the conclusion of the pre-draft process, he was projected to be a second to fourth round draft pick by NFL draft experts and analysts. Tankersley was ranked the 11th best cornerback prospect in the draft by NFLDraftScout.com.

Pre-draft measurables
Height	Weight	Arm length	Hand span	Wingspan	40-yard dash	10-yard split	20-yard split	20-yard shuttle	Three-cone drill	Vertical jump	Broad jump	Bench press
6 ft 1 1/4 in (1.86 m)	199 lb (90 kg)	32 1/4 in (0.82 m)	9 1/8 in (0.23 m)	6 ft 4 1/4 in (1.94 m)	4.40 s	1.51 s	2.60 s	4.32 s	7.00 s	30.5 in (0.77 m)	10 ft 1 in (3.07 m)	13 reps
All values from NFL Combine/Pro Day

=== Miami Dolphins ===
==== 2017 ====
The Dolphins selected Tankersley in the third round (97th overall) of the 2017 NFL draft. He was the 16th cornerback selected in 2017. On May 5, 2017, the Dolphins signed him to a four-year, $3.17 million contract that includes a signing bonus of $706,288.

Tankersley competed against Alterraun Verner and Walt Aikens for the role as the third cornerback on the depth chart after Tony Lippett tore his ACL during training camp. Head coach Adam Gase named Tankersley the fifth cornerback on the Dolphins' depth chart, behind Xavien Howard, Byron Maxwell, Verner, and Bobby McCain to begin the regular season.

Tankersley was inactive as a healthy scratch for the first two games (Weeks 2–3) of the regular season. On October 1, he made his professional regular season debut and first career start after he surpassed Maxwell and Verner on the depth chart due to poor play exhibited by both. He recorded a season-high five combined tackles and deflected a pass during the 20–0 loss to the New Orleans Saints. As a rookie in his debut, Saints' quarterback Drew Brees targeted Tankersley as he was matched up with Michael Thomas. He allowed just four of seven completions for 36-yards and was congratulated by Brees for his play. Gase stated Howard and Tankersley would remain the starting outside corners moving forward with McCain remaining as the starting nickelback. In Week 10, Tankersley recorded a season-high six combined tackles during a 45–21 loss at the Carolina Panthers. On December 3, he collected two solo tackles and sustained a shoulder injury in the first half. Tankersley left after suffering an ankle injury in the second half as the Dolphins routed the Denver Broncos 35–9. The injuries sidelined him for the next three games (Weeks 14–16). He finished his rookie season with 31 combined tackles (27 solo) and seven pass deflections in 11 games and 11 starts.

==== 2018–2020 ====
On November 2, 2018, Tankersley was placed on injured reserve after suffering a torn ACL in practice.

On August 31, 2019, Tankersley was placed on the reserve/physically unable to perform list to start the season while recovering from the torn ACL.

Tankersley was placed on the reserve/COVID-19 list by the Dolphins on July 27, 2020. He was activated from the list seven days later and waived from the team the same day. Tankersley was re-signed to the Dolphins' practice squad on September 16. He was released on November 2.

=== Minnesota Vikings ===
On November 9, 2020, the Minnesota Vikings signed Tankersley to their practice squad. He was elevated to the active roster on December 19 and January 2, 2021, for the team's Weeks 15 and 17 games against the 2020 Chicago Bears season|Chicago Bears and Detroit Lions, and reverted to the practice squad after each game. Tankersley signed a reserve/future contract with the Vikings on January 4. On March 5, he was released by the Vikings.
