= Artavis Scott =

American gridiron football player (born 1994)

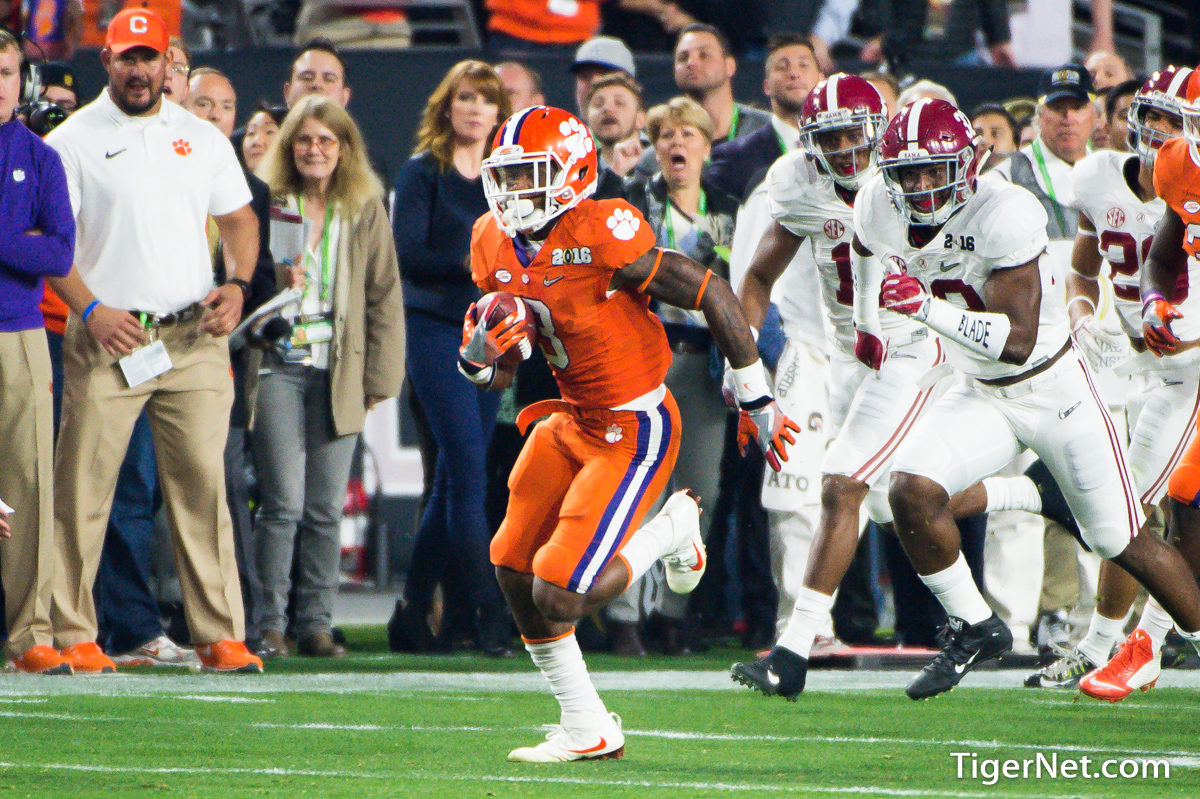

Clemson Tigers
- Title: Wide receivers coach

Personal information
- Born: October 12, 1994 (age 32); Oldsmar, Florida, U.S.
- Listed height: 5 ft 11 in (1.80 m)
- Listed weight: 195 lb (88 kg)

Career information
- High school: East Lake (Tarpon Springs, Florida)
- College: Clemson (2014–2016)
- NFL draft: 2017: undrafted

Career history

Playing
- Los Angeles Chargers (2017–2019); Indianapolis Colts (2020)*; Houston Texans (2020)*; Saskatchewan Roughriders (2021)*
- * Offseason or practice squad member only

Coaching
- Clemson (2022–2024) Graduate assistant; Howard (2025) Wide Receivers Coach; Clemson (2026-present) Assistant Running Backs Coach

Awards and highlights
- CFP national champion (2016); First-team All-ACC (2015); Second-team All-ACC (2014)
- Stats at Pro Football Reference

Artavis Scott (born October 12, 1994) is an American former professional football wide receiver. He signed with the Los Angeles Chargers after going undrafted in the 2017 NFL draft. He played college football at Clemson. He is currently the assistant running backs coach for Clemson, previously he was a graduate assistant for Clemson and the wide receivers coach at Howard University.

== Early life ==
Scott attended East Lake High School in Tarpon Springs, Florida. During his high school career, he had 172 receptions for 3,035 yards and 32 touchdowns receiving, 980 yards and 14 touchdowns rushing, 5,330 all-purpose yards and 51 total touchdowns. He was rated by Rivals.com as a four-star recruit and the ninth best wide receiver in his class. He committed to Clemson University to play college football.

== College career ==
Scott made an immediate impact as a true freshman at Clemson in 2014. In the second game of the season, he had six receptions for 164 yards and two touchdowns. In the Palmetto Bowl against South Carolina, he had 185 receiving yards and two touchdowns on seven receptions. His totals for the season were 76 receptions for 965 yards and eight touchdowns. As a sophomore in 2015, Scott played 15 games with 93 receptions, 901 receiving yards, and six touchdowns. On January 9, 2017, Scott was part of the Clemson team that defeated Alabama in the 2017 College Football Playoff National Championship by a score of 35–31. In the game, he recorded three receptions for six yards. As a junior in 2016, Scott played 15 games with 614 receiving yards and five touchdowns. After the season, Scott decided to forgo his senior year and enter the 2017 NFL draft.

== Professional career ==
Pre-draft measurables
Height	Weight	Arm length	Hand span	40-yard dash	20-yard shuttle	Three-cone drill	Vertical jump	Broad jump	Bench press
5 ft 10 1/8 in (1.78 m)	193 lb (88 kg)	31 in (0.79 m)	9 3/8 in (0.24 m)	4.61 s	4.49 s	7.19 s	31.0 in (0.79 m)	9 ft 8 in (2.95 m)	13 reps
All values from NFL Combine

=== Los Angeles Chargers ===
Scott signed with the Los Angeles Chargers as an undrafted free agent following the 2017 NFL draft and was reunited with former Clemson Tigers teammate Mike Williams. He was waived on September 2, 2017, and was signed to the Chargers' practice squad the next day. He signed a reserve/future contract with the Chargers on January 2, 2018.

On September 1, 2018, Scott was placed on injured reserve.

On August 31, 2019, Scott was waived by the Chargers and was signed to the practice squad the next day. His practice squad contract with the team expired on January 6, 2020.

=== Indianapolis Colts ===
On January 10, 2020, Scott signed a reserve/future contract with the Indianapolis Colts. He was waived by the Colts on September 3.

=== Houston Texans ===
On November 18, 2020, Scott was signed to the Houston Texans' practice squad. His practice squad contract with the team expired after the season on January 11, 2021.

=== Saskatchewan Roughriders ===
On January 28, 2021, Scott signed with the Saskatchewan Roughriders of the Canadian Football League. On February 17, the Roughriders announced Scott was retiring to take a coaching opportunity.
