= 2018 All-America college football team =

Official list of the best college football players of 2018

The 2018 All-America college football team includes those players of American college football who have been honored by various selector organizations as the best players at their respective positions. The selector organizations award the "All-America" honor annually following the conclusion of the fall college football season. The original All-America team was the 1889 All-America college football team selected by Caspar Whitney and Walter Camp. The National Collegiate Athletic Bureau, which is the National Collegiate Athletic Association's (NCAA) service bureau, compiled, in the 1950, the first list of All-Americans including first-team selections on teams created for a national audience that received national circulation with the intent of recognizing selections made from viewpoints that were nationwide. Since 1957, College Sports Information Directors of America (CoSIDA) has bestowed Academic All-American recognition on male and female athletes in Divisions I, II, and III of the NCAA as well as National Association of Intercollegiate Athletics athletes, including all NCAA championship sports.

The 2018 All-America college football team is composed of the following All-America first teams chosen by the following selector organizations: Associated Press (AP), Football Writers Association of America (FWAA), American Football Coaches Association (AFCA), Walter Camp Foundation (WCFF), Sporting News (TSN, from its historic name of The Sporting News), Sports Illustrated (SI), USA Today (USAT) ESPN, CBS Sports (CBS), College Football News (CFN), Scout.com, Athlon Sports, and Fox Sports (FOX).

Currently, the NCAA compiles consensus all-America teams in the sports of Division I FBS football and Division I men's basketball using a point system computed from All-America teams named by coaches associations or media sources. Players are chosen against other players playing at their position only. To be selected a consensus All-American, players must be chosen to the first team on at least two of the five official selectors as recognized by the NCAA. Second- and third-team honors are used to break ties. Players named first-team by all five selectors are deemed unanimous All-Americans. Currently, the NCAA recognizes All-Americans selected by the AP, AFCA, FWAA, TSN, and the WCFF to determine consensus and unanimous All-Americans.

Twenty-seven players were recognized as consensus All-Americans for 2018, eight of them being unanimous. Unanimous selections are followed by an asterisk (*).

2018 Consensus All-Americans
Name	Position	Year	University
Tua Tagovailoa	Quarterback	Sophomore	Alabama
Darrell Henderson	Running Back	Junior	Memphis
Jonathan Taylor*	Running Back	Sophomore	Wisconsin
Andy Isabella	Wide Receiver	Senior	UMass
Jerry Jeudy	Wide Receiver	Sophomore	Alabama
Jace Sternberger	Tight End	Junior	Texas A&M
Jonah Williams*	Offensive Line	Junior	Alabama
Garrett Bradbury	Offensive Line	Senior	NC State
Ben Powers	Offensive Line	Senior	Oklahoma
Mitch Hyatt	Offensive Line	Senior	Clemson
Beau Benzschawel	Offensive Line	Senior	Wisconsin
Christian Wilkins*	Defensive Line	Senior	Clemson
Quinnen Williams*	Defensive Line	Junior	Alabama
Ed Oliver	Defensive Line	Junior	Houston
Clelin Ferrell	Defensive Line	Senior	Clemson
Josh Allen*	Linebacker	Senior	Kentucky
Devin Bush	Linebacker	Junior	Michigan
Devin White	Linebacker	Junior	LSU
Grant Delpit*	Defensive Back	Sophomore	LSU
Julian Love	Defensive Back	Junior	Notre Dame
Deandre Baker	Defensive Back	Senior	Georgia
Greedy Williams	Defensive Back	Sophomore	LSU
Deionte Thompson	Defensive Back	Junior	Alabama
Andre Szmyt*	Kicker	Freshman	Syracuse
Braden Mann*	Punter	Junior	Texas A&M
Rondale Moore	All-Purpose	Freshman	Purdue
Savon Scarver	All-Purpose	Sophomore	Utah State

== Offense ==
=== Quarterback ===
- Kyler Murray, Oklahoma (AP, FWAA, SI, USAT, CFN, ESPN, CBS)
- Tua Tagovailoa, Alabama (AFCA, TSN, WCFF, Athlon)

=== Running back ===
- Darrell Henderson, Memphis (AFCA, AP, FWAA, WCFF, SI, USAT, CFN, ESPN, CBS, Athlon)
- Jonathan Taylor, Wisconsin (AFCA, AP, FWAA, TSN, WCFF, SI, USAT, CFN, CBS, Athlon)
- Travis Etienne, Clemson (TSN, ESPN)

=== Wide receiver ===
- Marquise Brown, Oklahoma (AP, SI, USAT, ESPN, CBS)
- Andy Isabella, UMass (AFCA, FWAA, WCFF, USAT, CFN, Athlon)
- Jerry Jeudy, Alabama (AFCA, AP, TSN, WCFF, SI, ESPN, CBS, Athlon)
- Rondale Moore, Purdue (CFN)
- Tylan Wallace, Oklahoma State (TSN, ESPN, Athlon)
- Antoine Wesley, Texas Tech (FWAA)

=== Tight end ===
- Jace Sternberger, Texas A&M (AP, FWAA, TSN, WCFF, SI, CFN, CBS, Athlon)
- T. J. Hockenson, Iowa (AFCA, USAT)

=== Offensive line ===
- Beau Benzschawel, Wisconsin (AFCA, AP, WCFF, SI, USAT, CFN, ESPN, CBS, Athlon)
- Garrett Bradbury, North Carolina State (AFCA, AP, FWAA, WCFF, USAT, Athlon)
- Michael Deiter, Wisconsin (FWAA)
- Lamont Gaillard, Georgia (CFN)
- Mitch Hyatt, Clemson (AFCA, AP, FWAA, WCFF, CFN, Athlon)
- Michael Jordan, Ohio State (SI, CBS)
- Sam Mustipher, Notre Dame (ESPN)
- Ross Pierschbacher, Alabama (TSN)
- Ben Powers, Oklahoma (AFCA, FWAA, TSN, WCFF, USAT, CFN)
- Terrone Prescod, North Carolina State (TSN, ESPN)
- Dalton Risner, Kansas State (TSN, USAT, ESPN, CBS, Athlon)
- Dru Samia, Oklahoma (SI)
- Bunchy Stallings, Kentucky (AP)
- Andrew Thomas, Georgia (SI, CBS)
- Jonah Williams, Alabama (AFCA, AP, FWAA, TSN, WCFF, SI, USAT, CFN, ESPN, CBS, Athlon)

== Defense ==
=== Defensive line ===
- Clelin Ferrell, Clemson (AFCA, AP, TSN, WCFF, SI, USAT, CFN, ESPN, CBS, Athlon)
- Dre'Mont Jones, Ohio State (CFN)
- Dexter Lawrence, Clemson (AFCA)
- Ed Oliver, Houston (FWAA, WCFF, CBS)
- Sutton Smith, Northern Illinois (AP, SI, USAT, CFN, ESPN, Athlon)
- Montez Sweat, Mississippi State (FWAA, TSN)
- Jerry Tillery, Notre Dame (SI, CBS)
- Christian Wilkins, Clemson (AFCA, AP, FWAA, TSN, WCFF, USAT, ESPN, Athlon)
- Quinnen Williams, Alabama (AFCA, AP, FWAA, TSN, WCFF, SI, USAT, CFN, ESPN, CBS, Athlon)

=== Linebacker ===
- Josh Allen, Kentucky (AFCA, AP, FWAA, TSN, WCFF, SI, USAT, CFN, ESPN, CBS, Athlon)
- Devin Bush, Michigan (AFCA, FWAA, TSN, WCFF, SI, USAT, CFN, CBS)
- Devin White, LSU (AFCA, AP, TSN, WCFF, SI, USAT, CFN, ESPN, CBS, Athlon)
- Ben Burr-Kirven, Washington (AP, FWAA, ESPN, Athlon)

=== Defensive back ===
- Deandre Baker, Georgia (AFCA, AP, TSN, WCFF, SI, USAT, CFN, ESPN, CBS, Athlon)
- Hamp Cheevers, Boston College (FWAA)
- Grant Delpit, LSU (AFCA, AP, FWAA, TSN, WCFF, SI, CFN, CBS, Athlon)
- Julian Love, Notre Dame (AP, FWAA, TSN, WCFF, SI, USAT, ESPN)
- Byron Murphy, Washington (Athlon)
- Taylor Rapp, Washington (USAT, ESPN)
- Deionte Thompson, Alabama (AFCA, AP, TSN, SI, USAT, CFN, ESPN, CBS, Athlon)
- Greedy Williams, LSU (AFCA, FWAA, WCFF, CFN, CBS)

== Special teams ==
=== Kicker ===
- Andre Szmyt, Syracuse (AFCA, AP, FWAA, TSN, WCFF, SI, USAT, ESPN, CBS)
- Cole Tracy, LSU (CFN, Athlon)

=== Punter ===
- Braden Mann, Texas A&M (AFCA, AP, FWAA, TSN, WCFF, SI, USAT, ESPN, CFN, CBS, Athlon)

=== All-purpose / return specialist ===
- Greg Dortch, Wake Forest (FWAA, SI, CBS)
- Mecole Hardman, Georgia (ESPN, Athlon)
- Darrell Henderson, Memphis (TSN)
- Rondale Moore, Purdue (AP, FWAA, SI, USAT, ESPN, CBS, Athlon)
- Deebo Samuel, South Carolina (AFCA)
- Savon Scarver, Utah State (FWAA, WCFF, CFN, CBS, Athlon)
- Isaiah Wright, Temple (TSN)

== See also ==
- 2018 All-ACC football team
- 2018 All-SEC football team
- 2018 All-Big Ten Conference football team
- 2018 All-Big 12 Conference football team
- 2018 All-Pac-12 Conference football team
