= Christian Wilkins =

American football player (born 1995)

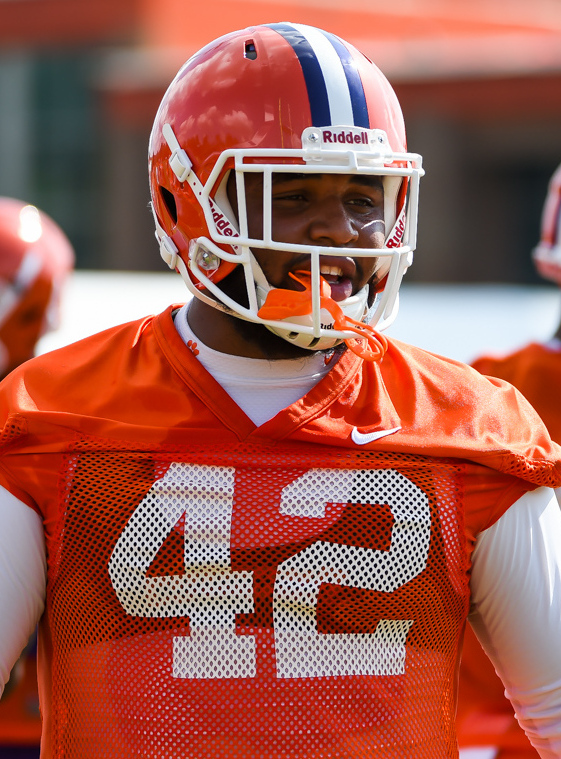
- Wilkins with the Clemson Tigers in 2016

Profile
- Position: Defensive tackle

Personal information
- Born: December 20, 1995 (age 30); Springfield, Massachusetts, U.S.
- Listed height: 6 ft 4 in (1.93 m)
- Listed weight: 310 lb (141 kg)

Career information
- High school: Framingham (Framingham, Massachusetts) Suffield Academy (Suffield, Connecticut)
- College: Clemson (2015–2018)
- NFL draft: 2019: 1st round, 13th overall pick

Career history
- Miami Dolphins (2019–2023); Las Vegas Raiders (2024)

Awards and highlights
- 2× CFP national champion (2016, 2018); William V. Campbell Trophy (2018); Bill Willis Trophy (2017); Unanimous All-American (2018); 2× First-team All-American (2016, 2017); 2× First-team All-ACC (2017, 2018); Second-team All-ACC (2016)

Career NFL statistics as of 2024
- Total tackles: 372
- Sacks: 22.5
- Forced fumbles: 4
- Fumble recoveries: 6
- Interceptions: 1
- Pass deflections: 19
- Stats at Pro Football Reference

Christian Wilkins (born December 20, 1995) is an American professional football defensive tackle. He played college football for the Clemson Tigers and was selected by the Miami Dolphins in the first round of the 2019 NFL draft. He has also played for the Las Vegas Raiders.

== Early life ==
Wilkins is a native of Springfield, Massachusetts. He originally attended Framingham High School, before transferring to Suffield Academy in Suffield, Connecticut, after his freshman year. In 35 games in high school he had 253 tackles and 28.5 sacks. Wilkins was rated as a five-star recruit and was ranked among the top players in his class. He committed to play college football at Clemson University.

== College career ==
As a freshman at Clemson in 2015, Wilkins played in 15 games with one start and had 33 tackles and two sacks. As a sophomore in 2016, he was named an All-American by the Football Writers Association of America (FWAA) and was a finalist for the Bronko Nagurski Trophy. During one game that year, he grabbed Curtis Samuel of Ohio State University in an inappropriate area and apologized later, saying he was trying to be "silly" but drawing criticism from fans.

Wilkins was part of the Clemson team that defeated top-ranked Alabama in the 2017 College Football Playoff National Championship by a score of 35–31. He also was part of Clemson's 2018 team that defeated Alabama in the National Championship game led by Trevor Lawrence 44–16. In the Florida State game and South Carolina game of 2018, Wilkins scored a touchdown for the Tigers.

== Professional career ==
Pre-draft measurables
Height	Weight	Arm length	Hand span	40-yard dash	10-yard split	20-yard split	20-yard shuttle	Vertical jump	Broad jump	Bench press	Wonderlic
6 ft 3 1/4 in (1.91 m)	315 lb (143 kg)	32 1/2 in (0.83 m)	9 3/4 in (0.25 m)	5.04 s	1.76 s	2.94 s	4.55 s	29.5 in (0.75 m)	8 ft 11 in (2.72 m)	28 reps	19
All values from 2019 NFL Combine

=== Miami Dolphins ===
Wilkins was selected by the Miami Dolphins in the first round (13th overall) of the 2019 NFL draft. In a Week 7 loss of 21–31 to the Buffalo Bills, Wilkins was ejected after throwing a punch at Cody Ford on the second play of the game. In Week 9 against the New York Jets, Wilkins recorded his first career sack on Sam Darnold in the 26–18 win. In Week 16 against the Cincinnati Bengals, Wilkins recorded his first career touchdown reception on a pass from Ryan Fitzpatrick in the 38–35 overtime victory.

In Week 8 of the 2020 season against the Los Angeles Rams, Wilkins recorded his first career interception off a pass thrown by Jared Goff during the 28–17 win. Wilkins was placed on the reserve/COVID-19 list by the team on November 12, 2020, and activated on November 25.

In Week 15 of 2021 against the Jets, Wilkins lined up at fullback and recorded his second career touchdown on a flea flicker pass from quarterback Tua Tagovailoa.

The Dolphins picked up the fifth-year option on Wilkins' contract on April 28, 2022.

Wilkins finished 2023 with a career-high nine sacks, establishing himself as a top tier player at his position.

=== Las Vegas Raiders ===
On March 14, 2024, the Las Vegas Raiders signed Wilkins to a four-year deal worth $110 million, with $84.75 million guaranteed. Wilkins produced 17 tackles, 2 sacks and 6 QB hits before suffering a foot injury in Week 5 against the Denver Broncos. After injuring his foot during the game, Wilkins was placed on season-ending injured reserve following surgery to repair a Jones fracture.

On July 18, 2025, Wilkins was placed on the reserve/PUP list ahead of training camp. On July 24, Wilkins was released by the Raiders with a terminated vested veteran designation. Additionally, the Raiders moved to void $35.2 million of guaranteed salary on his contract due to how he approached the rehab process. In response, Wilkins filed a grievance with the NFLPA. The release allegedly also stemmed from an incident where Wilkins attempted to kiss a teammate on the head. Though the event was said to be "playful", the unnamed teammate took offense to Wilkins' actions, and filed a complaint regarding Wilkins that was investigated by the Raiders' human resources department. In total, Wilkins received $49.7 million of his original contract, playing in just five games for the Raiders.

== Career statistics ==
=== NFL ===
Legend
**Bold**	Career high

Year	Team	Games		Tackles				Fumbles				Interceptions					
Year	Team	GP	GS	Cmb	Solo	Ast	Sck	FF	FR	Yds	TD	Int	Yds	Avg	Lng	TD	PD
2019	MIA	16	14	56	30	26	2.0	0	1	0	0	0	0	0.0	0	0	2
2020	MIA	14	12	47	28	19	1.5	0	1	0	0	1	**8**	**8.0**	**8**	0	5
2021	MIA	**17**	**17**	89	49	**40**	4.5	1	1	**9**	0	0	0	0.0	0	0	4
2022	MIA	**17**	**17**	**98**	**59**	39	3.5	**2**	1	2	0	0	0	0.0	0	0	**6**
2023	MIA	**17**	**17**	65	38	27	**9.0**	1	**2**	0	0	0	0	0.0	0	0	2
2024	LV	5	5	17	11	6	2.0	0	0	0	0	0	0	0.0	0	0	0
Career		86	82	372	215	157	22.5	4	6	11	0	1	8	8.0	8	0	19

=== College ===
College statistics
Year	GP	Tackles					Interceptions					Fumbles			
Year	GP	Solo	Ast	Total	Loss	Sack	Int	Yards	Avg	TD	PD	FR	Yards	TD	FF
2015	11	18	15	33	4.5	2	0	0	0.0	0	0	0	0	0	**1**
2016	**15**	24	24	48	13.0	3.5	0	0	0.0	0	**9**	**2**	0	0	0
2017	14	**27**	**33**	**60**	9.0	5	0	0	0.0	0	4	0	0	0	0
2018	**15**	25	26	51	**14.0**	**5.5**	0	0	0.0	0	**2**	2	0	0	**1**
