= Andre Szmyt =

American football player (born 1998)

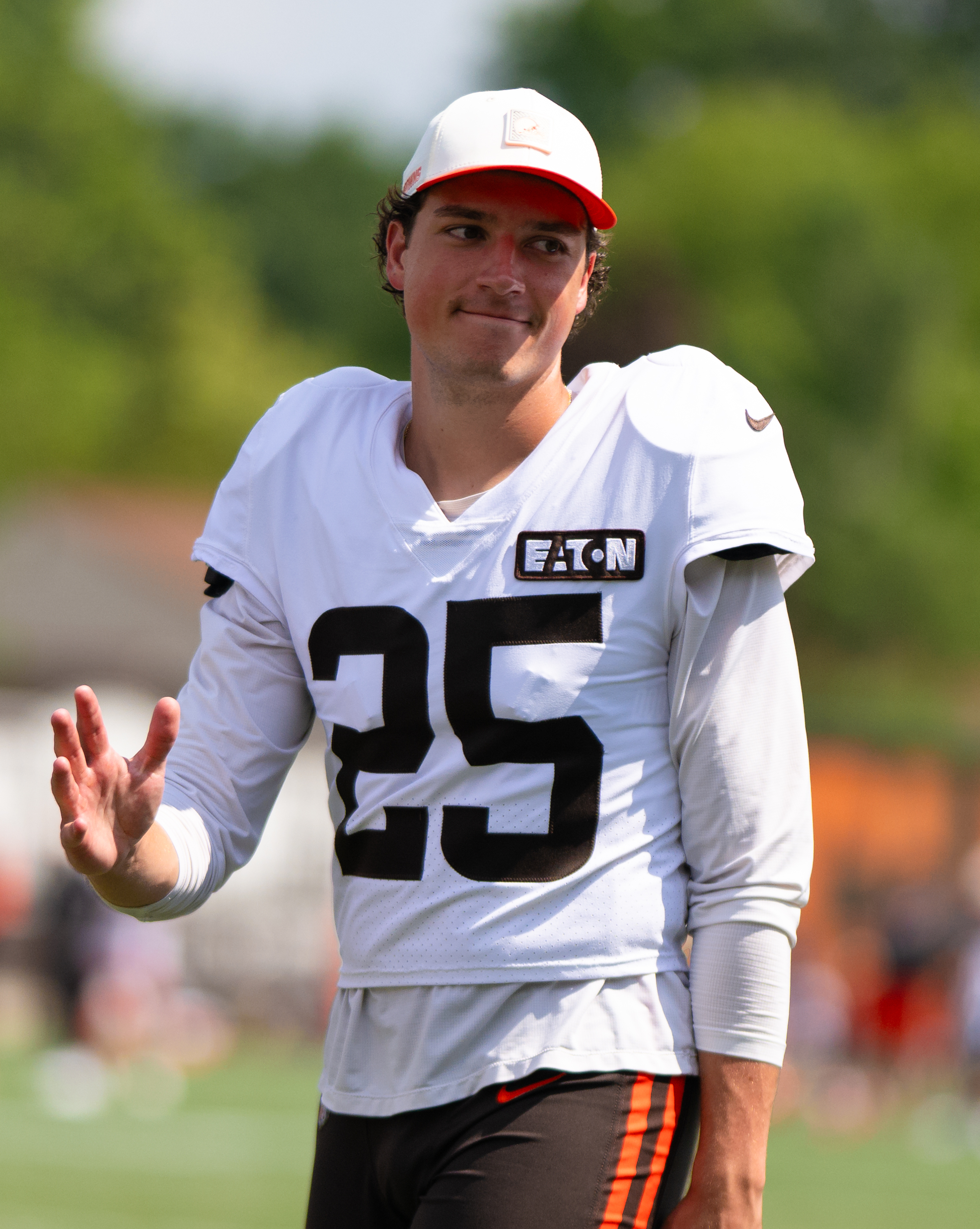
- Szmyt with the Cleveland Browns in 2026

No. 25 – Cleveland Browns
- Position: Kicker
- Roster status: Active

Personal information
- Born: September 26, 1998 (age 28); Lake Forest, Illinois, U.S.
- Listed height: 6 ft 0 in (1.83 m)
- Listed weight: 200 lb (91 kg)

Career information
- High school: Vernon Hills (Vernon Hills, Illinois)
- College: Syracuse (2017–2022)
- NFL draft: 2023: undrafted

Career history
- Chicago Bears (2023)*; St. Louis Battlehawks (2024); Cleveland Browns (2024–present)
- * Offseason or practice squad member only

Awards and highlights
- UFL field goals leader (2024); Lou Groza Award (2018); Vlade Award (2018); Unanimous All-American (2018); First-team All-ACC (2018); Third-team All-ACC (2019)

Career NFL statistics as of Week 10, 2026
- Field goals made: 45
- Field goals attempted: 51
- Field goal %: 88.2%
- Extra points made: 40
- Extra points attempted: 42
- Extra point %: 95.2%
- Points: 175
- Longest field goal: 56
- Touchbacks: 20
- Stats at Pro Football Reference

Andre Eric Szmyt (/ʃmɪt/ SHMITT; born September 26, 1998) is an American professional football placekicker for the Cleveland Browns of the National Football League (NFL). He played college football for the Syracuse Orange.

== College career ==
Szmyt redshirted his true freshman year in 2017, and was named to the SU Athletic Director’s Honor Roll in the fall.

In 2018, Szmyt became the first Syracuse kicker and third freshman to win the Lou Groza Award, and was named a unanimous All-American, being the first since Dwight Freeney in 2001. Szmyt also won the 2018 Vlade Award. In 2018, Szmyt connected on 30 of 34 field goals, and hit all 61 extra points. He also kicked a season-high 54 yard field goal in a loss to Pittsburgh.

In the 2019 season, Szmyt was successful on 17 of 20 field goals, one of which was a 50 yard field goal in the beginning of the second quarter in a loss at Florida State. Against Wake Forest on the last week of the season, he connected on a 49 yard field goal with 44 seconds left until the Demon Deacons tied the game. In overtime he also kicked a 40 yard field goal in the 39-30 win (Syracuse got the score off a fumble return touchdown).

In the 2020 season, Szmyt successfully completed 9 of 11 field goal attempts in a shortened season.

In the 2021 season, Szmyt only successfully completed 9 of 14 field goal attempts.

Szmyt's performance was marred by coaching changes and his holders switching, but he returned to a better form when Bob Ligashesky took over as the special teams coordinator in 2022. That season, he connected on 20 of 26 field goals and all 40 of his extra point attempts.

== Professional career ==
Pre-draft measurables
| Height | Weight | Arm length | Hand span | Wingspan |
|---|---|---|---|---|
| 6 ft 0 5/8 in (1.84 m) | 200 lb (91 kg) | 30 1/4 in (0.77 m) | 9 1/4 in (0.23 m) | 6 ft 1 1/2 in (1.87 m) |
All values from Syracuse's Pro Day

=== Chicago Bears ===
Szmyt was signed by the Chicago Bears as an undrafted free agent on May 4, 2023. He was waived by the Bears on August 8.

=== St. Louis Battlehawks ===
On January 22, 2024, Szmyt signed with the St. Louis Battlehawks of the United Football League (UFL). He re-signed with the team on August 21.

=== Cleveland Browns ===
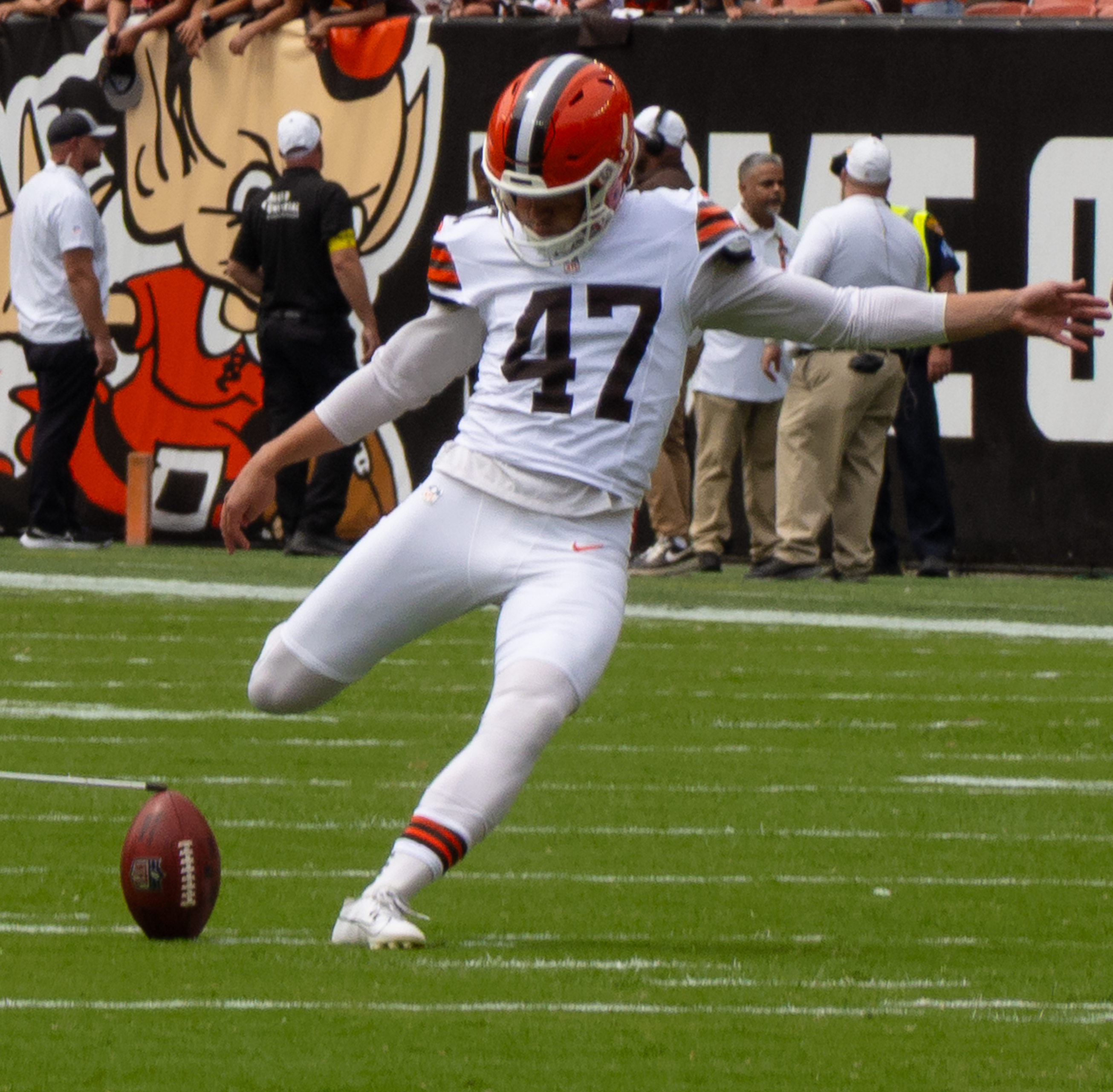
Szmyt warming up in a preseason game against the Los Angeles Rams, 2025

On December 24, 2024, Szmyt was signed to the Cleveland Browns practice squad. He signed a reserve/future contract with Cleveland on January 6, 2025. On June 4, Szmyt was waived by the Browns. He was re-signed on June 26.

==== 2025 season ====
On August 26, Szmyt made the Browns' initial 53 man roster, beating out incumbent Dustin Hopkins for the kicking job. On September 7, Szmyt missed an extra point to tie the game, and late in the same game missed a field goal that would have given the Browns a win against the Cincinnati Bengals in the 17–16 loss, causing some media and fans to criticize him. However, 2 weeks later on September 21, Szmyt hit a game-winning 55-yard field goal to beat the Green Bay Packers in a 13–10 comeback win.

==== 2026 season ====
On April 6, 2026, Szmyt re-signed with the Browns. In a Week 2 victory against the Tampa Bay Buccaneers, Szmyt converted two extra points and three field goals, including one from 50 yards and was named AFC Special Teams Player of the Week for his performance. In a Week 4 victory against the Pittsburgh Steelers on Thursday Night Football, Szmyt converted three PATs and two field goals, including a game winning, career-long 56-yard field goal with 10 seconds remaining in regulation.

== NFL career statistics ==
=== Regular season ===
| General | | | Field goals | | | | | PATs | | | Kickoffs | | | Points | |
| Season | Team | GP | FGM | FGA | FG% | Blck | Long | XPM | XPA | XP% | KO | Avg | TBs | Pts | |
|---|---|---|---|---|---|---|---|---|---|---|---|---|---|---|---|
| 2025 | CLE | 17 | 24 | 27 | 88.9 | 0 | 55 | 25 | 26 | 96.2 | 67 | 59.5 | 13 | 97 | |
| 2026 | CLE | 10 | 21 | 24 | 87.5 | 0 | 56 | 15 | 16 | 93.8 | 46 | 61.0 | 7 | 78 | |
| 2026 | Career | | 26 | 45 | 51 | 88.2 | 0 | 56 | 40 | 42 | 95.2 | 113 | 60.0 | 20 | 175 |
