= Clelin Ferrell =

American football player (born 1997)

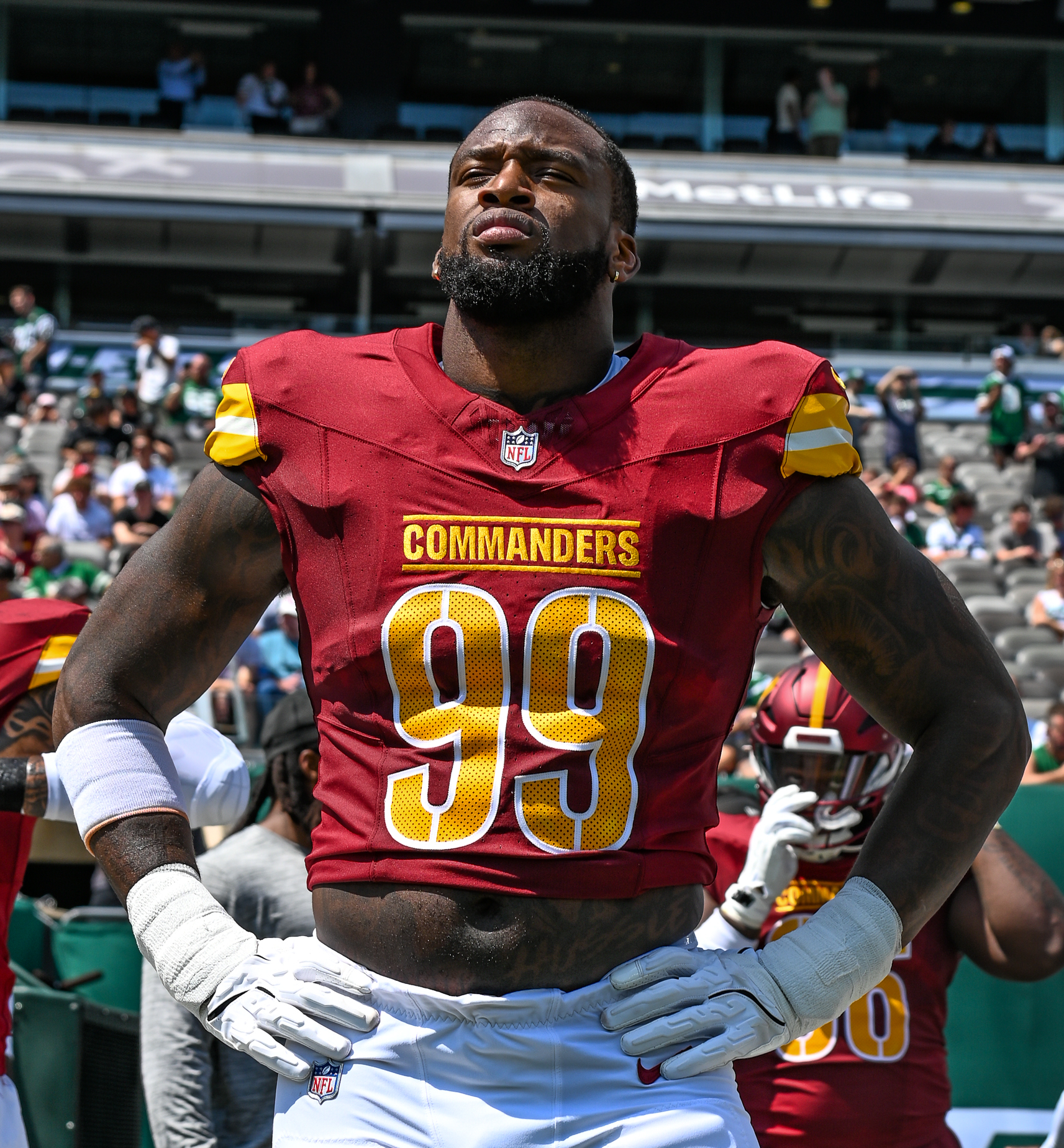
- Ferrell with the Washington Commanders in 2024

Profile
- Position: Defensive end

Personal information
- Born: May 17, 1997 (age 29); Richmond, Virginia, U.S.
- Listed height: 6 ft 4 in (1.93 m)
- Listed weight: 260 lb (118 kg)

Career information
- High school: Benedictine (Richmond)
- College: Clemson (2015–2018)
- NFL draft: 2019: 1st round, 4th overall pick

Career history
- Oakland / Las Vegas Raiders (2019–2022); San Francisco 49ers (2023); Washington Commanders (2024); Los Angeles Chargers (2025); San Francisco 49ers (2025); Miami Dolphins (2026)

Awards and highlights
- 2× CFP national champion (2016, 2018); Ted Hendricks Award (2018); ACC Defensive Player of the Year (2018); Consensus All-American (2018); 2× first-team All-American (2017, 2018); 2× first team All-ACC (2017, 2018)

Career NFL statistics as of Week 3, 2026
- Tackles: 187
- Sacks: 21.0
- Forced fumbles: 4
- Fumble recoveries: 2
- Pass deflections: 12
- Stats at Pro Football Reference

Clelin Ferrell (born May 17, 1997) is an American professional football defensive end. He played college football for the Clemson Tigers, winning the 2018 Ted Hendricks Award, and was selected fourth overall by the Las Vegas Raiders in the 2019 NFL draft. Ferrell has also played for the Los Angeles Chargers, Washington Commanders and San Francisco 49ers.

== Early life ==
Ferrell was born on May 17, 1997, in Richmond, Virginia. Clelin attended Benedictine College Preparatory, a Catholic, military, all boy, private High School in Richmond. Clelin committed to play college football at Clemson nearly three months before he tore his ACL, which caused him to miss his senior football season.

== College career ==
At Clemson, Ferrell suffered a hand injury that forced him to redshirt the 2015 season. Returning the following season, he was named co-defensive rookie of the year award with Dexter Lawrence after recording 50 tackles, 12.5 for loss, and six sacks. Ferrell was named first-team All-American in 2017 and won the Ted Hendricks Award and ACC Defensive Player of the Year in 2018 after recording 53 tackles, 11.5 sacks, four pass breakups, and three forced fumbles. He led the ACC in sacks and tackles for loss in the 2018 season. He declared for the 2019 NFL draft following the season.

== Professional career ==
Pre-draft measurables
| Height | Weight | Arm length | Hand span | Wingspan | 20-yard shuttle | Three-cone drill | Broad jump | Bench press | Wonderlic |
|---|---|---|---|---|---|---|---|---|---|
| 6 ft 4 3/8 in (1.94 m) | 264 lb (120 kg) | 34 1/8 in (0.87 m) | 10 1/2 in (0.27 m) | 6 ft 10 3/8 in (2.09 m) | 4.40 s | 7.26 s | 9 ft 6 in (2.90 m) | 25 reps | 21 |
All values are from NFL Scouting Combine

=== Oakland / Las Vegas Raiders ===
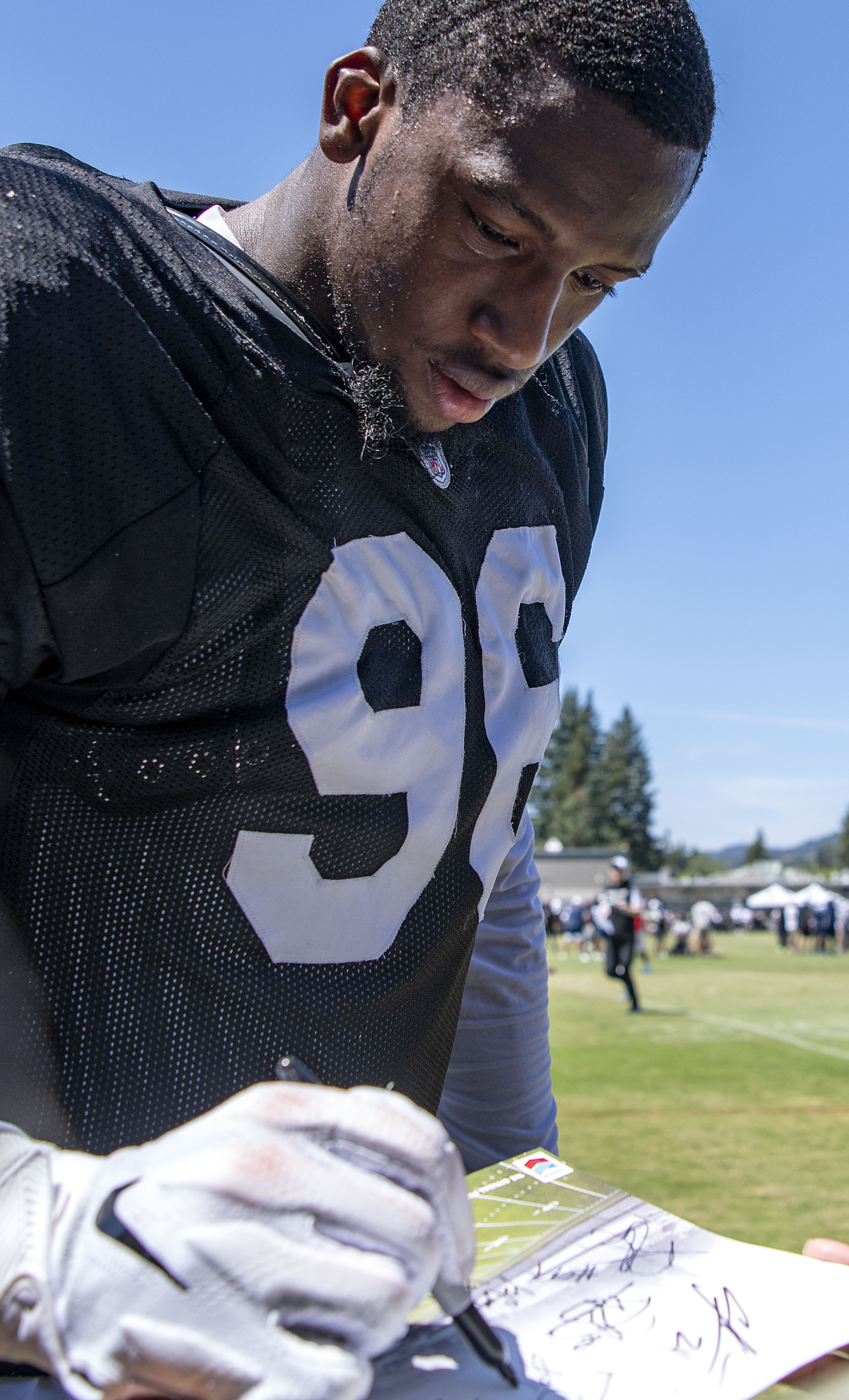
Ferrell signing an autograph at the Oakland Raiders training camp in 2019

Ferrell was selected by the Oakland Raiders fourth overall in the 2019 NFL draft. This selection was met with widespread criticism as Ferrell was widely regarded as a late first round or early second round pick, while several other defensive linemen more highly-rated than Ferrell like Josh Allen and Ed Oliver were available. On June 18, 2019, Ferrell signed his four-year rookie contract, worth a fully guaranteed $31.2 million, including a $20.8 million signing bonus. Ferrell made his NFL debut in Week 1 against the Denver Broncos on Monday Night Football. In the game, Ferrell made three tackles and recorded his first sack on Joe Flacco in the 24–16 win. In Week 10 against the Los Angeles Chargers on Thursday Night Football, Ferrell recorded 8 tackles and sacked Philip Rivers 2.5 times in the 26–24 win.

Ferrell was placed on the reserve/COVID-19 list by the Raiders on November 17, 2020, and activated on November 26. In Week 13 against the New York Jets, he recorded two strip sacks on Sam Darnold that were recovered by the Raiders during the 31–28 win. On December 30, 2020, Ferrell was placed on injured reserve. He finished the season with 27 tackles, two sacks, and two forced fumbles through 11 games.

On April 29, 2022, the Raiders announced that they would not pick up the fifth-year option on Ferrell's contract, making him a free agent in the 2023 offseason. Ferrell recorded half sacks in a Week 7, 38–20 win against the Houston Texans and a Week 13, 27–20 win against the Chargers. He recorded his final sack as a Raider during a Week 18, 31–13 loss to the Kansas City Chiefs.

=== San Francisco 49ers (first stint) ===
On March 16, 2023, Ferrell signed a one-year contract with the San Francisco 49ers.

Ferrell recorded his first forced fumble as a 49er in a Week 8, 31–17 loss to the Cincinnati Bengals, during which he also recorded his first half sack for the team. The following week he recorded his first full sack in a 34–3 victory against the Jacksonville Jaguars. He recorded another sack in a Week 14, 28–16 victory over the Seattle Seahawks. In the 2023 season, he started in all 17 regular season games. He finished with 3.5 sacks, 28 total tackles (15 solo), one pass defended, one forced fumble, and one fumble recovery.

=== Washington Commanders ===
On March 18, 2024, Ferrell signed with the Washington Commanders. In 14 appearances (10 starts) for the Commanders, Ferrell logged 1 forced fumble, 3.5 sacks, and 26 combined tackles. Ferrell re-signed with the Commanders on a one-year contract on March 15, 2025, and was released on August 26 as part of final roster cuts.

=== Los Angeles Chargers ===
On September 18, 2025, Ferrell signed with the Los Angeles Chargers practice squad. He was elevated to the active roster on October 4th, appeared in their October 5th game vs the Washington Commanders. He was put back onto the practice squad on October 6th. He was released on October 14.

=== San Francisco 49ers (second stint) ===
On October 29, 2025, Ferrell signed with the 49ers' practice squad. On November 15, Ferrell was promoted to the active roster.

=== Miami Dolphins ===
On July 27, 2026, Ferrell signed with the Miami Dolphins. He was released by the Dolphins on August 31. The following day, Miami re–signed Ferrell to their practice squad. On September 28, Ferrell was released.

== Career statistics ==
=== NFL ===
Legend
| **Bold** | Career high |

==== Regular season ====
| Year | Team | Games | | Tackles | | | | | | Interceptions | | | | | Fumbles | | | |
| Year | Team | GP | GS | Cmb | Solo | Ast | TfL | Sck | Sfty | Int | Yds | Lng | TD | PD | FF | FR | Yds | TD |
|---|---|---|---|---|---|---|---|---|---|---|---|---|---|---|---|---|---|---|
| 2019 | OAK | 15 | 15 | **38** | **24** | 14 | **8** | **4.5** | 0 | 0 | 0 | 0 | 0 | **5** | 0 | **1** | 0 | 0 |
| 2020 | LV | 11 | 11 | 27 | 18 | 9 | 3 | 2.0 | 0 | 0 | 0 | 0 | 0 | 3 | **2** | 0 | 0 | 0 |
| 2021 | LV | 16 | 0 | 14 | 8 | 6 | 1 | 1.5 | 0 | 0 | 0 | 0 | 0 | 1 | 0 | 0 | 0 | 0 |
| 2022 | LV | 16 | 4 | 26 | 8 | **18** | 3 | 2.0 | 0 | 0 | 0 | 0 | 0 | 2 | 0 | 0 | 0 | 0 |
| 2023 | SF | **17** | **17** | 28 | 15 | 13 | 6 | 3.5 | 0 | 0 | 0 | 0 | 0 | 1 | 1 | **1** | 0 | 0 |
| 2024 | WAS | 14 | 10 | 26 | 11 | 15 | 4 | 3.5 | 0 | 0 | 0 | 0 | 0 | 0 | 1 | 0 | 0 | 0 |
| 2025 | LAC | 1 | 0 | 1 | 0 | 1 | 0 | 0.0 | 0 | 0 | 0 | 0 | 0 | 0 | 0 | 0 | 0 | 0 |
| 2025 | SF | 8 | 0 | 24 | 13 | 11 | 4 | 4.0 | 0 | 0 | 0 | 0 | 0 | 0 | 0 | 0 | 0 | 0 |
| 2026 | MIA | 3 | 0 | 3 | 1 | 2 | 0 | 0.0 | 0 | 0 | 0 | 0 | 0 | 0 | 0 | 0 | 0 | 0 |
| Career | | 101 | 57 | 187 | 98 | 89 | 29 | 21.0 | 0 | 0 | 0 | 0 | 0 | 12 | 4 | 2 | 0 | 0 |

==== Postseason ====
| Year | Team | Games | | Tackles | | | | | | Interceptions | | | | | Fumbles | | | |
| Year | Team | GP | GS | Cmb | Solo | Ast | TfL | Sck | Sfty | Int | Yds | Lng | TD | PD | FF | FR | Yds | TD |
|---|---|---|---|---|---|---|---|---|---|---|---|---|---|---|---|---|---|---|
| 2021 | LV | 1 | 0 | 0 | 0 | 0 | 0 | 0.0 | 0 | 0 | 0 | 0 | 0 | 0 | 0 | 0 | 0 | 0 |
| 2024 | WAS | **3** | 0 | **4** | **2** | **2** | 0 | 0.0 | 0 | 0 | 0 | 0 | 0 | **1** | 0 | 0 | 0 | 0 |
| 2025 | SF | 2 | 0 | **4** | **2** | **2** | 0 | 0.0 | 0 | 0 | 0 | 0 | 0 | 0 | 0 | 0 | 0 | 0 |
| Career | | 6 | 0 | 8 | 4 | 4 | 0 | 0.0 | 0 | 0 | 0 | 0 | 0 | 1 | 0 | 0 | 0 | 0 |

=== College ===
College statistics
| Year | GP | Tackles | | | | | Interceptions | | | | | Fumbles | | | |
| Year | GP | Solo | Ast | Total | Loss | Sack | Int | Yds | Avg | TD | PD | FR | Yds | TD | FF |
|---|---|---|---|---|---|---|---|---|---|---|---|---|---|---|---|
| 2015 | 1 | 1 | 0 | 1 | 0 | 0 | 0 | 0 | 0 | 0 | 0 | 0 | 0 | 0 | 0 |
| 2016 | 14 | 21 | 23 | 44 | 12.5 | 6 | 0 | 0 | 0 | 0 | 2 | 0 | 0 | 0 | 0 |
| 2017 | 14 | 33 | 33 | 66 | 18 | 9.5 | 0 | 0 | 0 | 0 | 1 | 0 | 0 | 0 | 2 |
| 2018 | 15 | 29 | 26 | 55 | 20 | 11.5 | 0 | 0 | 0 | 0 | 2 | 1 | 0 | 1 | 3 |
| Career | 44 | 84 | 82 | 166 | 50.5 | 27 | 0 | 0 | 0 | 0 | 5 | 1 | 0 | 1 | 5 |

== Personal life ==
Both of Ferrell's parents served in the U.S. military. He has four brothers and four sisters, all at least 10 years older than him. Ferrell's father Cleavester died from cancer in March 2012.
