= North Raleigh Christian Academy =

American private, Christian school in North Carolina

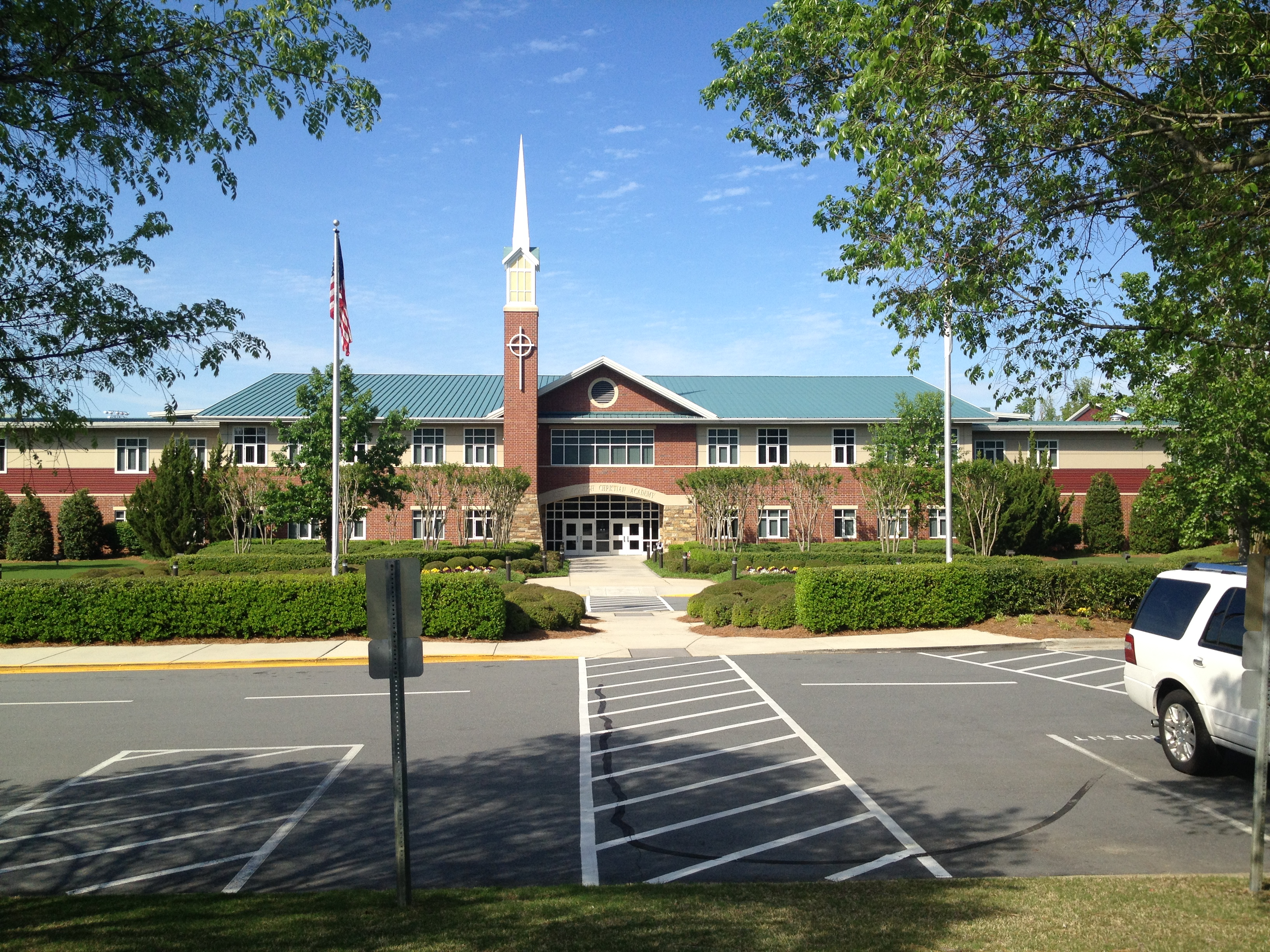

Location
- 7300 Perry Creek Road; Raleigh, North Carolina 27616; United States; 35°52′47″N 78°32′35″W

Information
- Type: Private
- Religious affiliation: Christian
- Denomination: Interdenominational
- Established: 1996 (30 years ago)
- Superintendent: Dr. Kevin Mathes
- CEEB code: 343223
- Staff: 135
- Faculty: 98
- Grades: PreK–12
- Enrollment: 1,470
- Campus: 56 acres (2,400,000 ft^{2})
- Campus type: Suburban
- Colors: Navy, white, and gold
- Athletics: North Carolina Independent Schools Athletic Association (NCISAA)
- Athletics conference: Triangle Independent Schools Athletic Conference (TISAC), Triangle Middle School Conference (TMSC)
- Mascot: Knights
- Accreditation: SACS, ACSI, CITA
- Yearbook: Sabre
- Tuition: $12,264 (grades 9–12); $9,176 (grades 6–8); $6,456 (grades 1–5)
- School verse: Ephesians 6:11
- Website: www.nrcaknights.com

North Raleigh Christian Academy (NRCA) is a private, coeducational, primary and secondary Christian day school located in Raleigh, North Carolina, United States. Also referred to as simply North Raleigh Christian, the school was founded in 1996.

== History ==
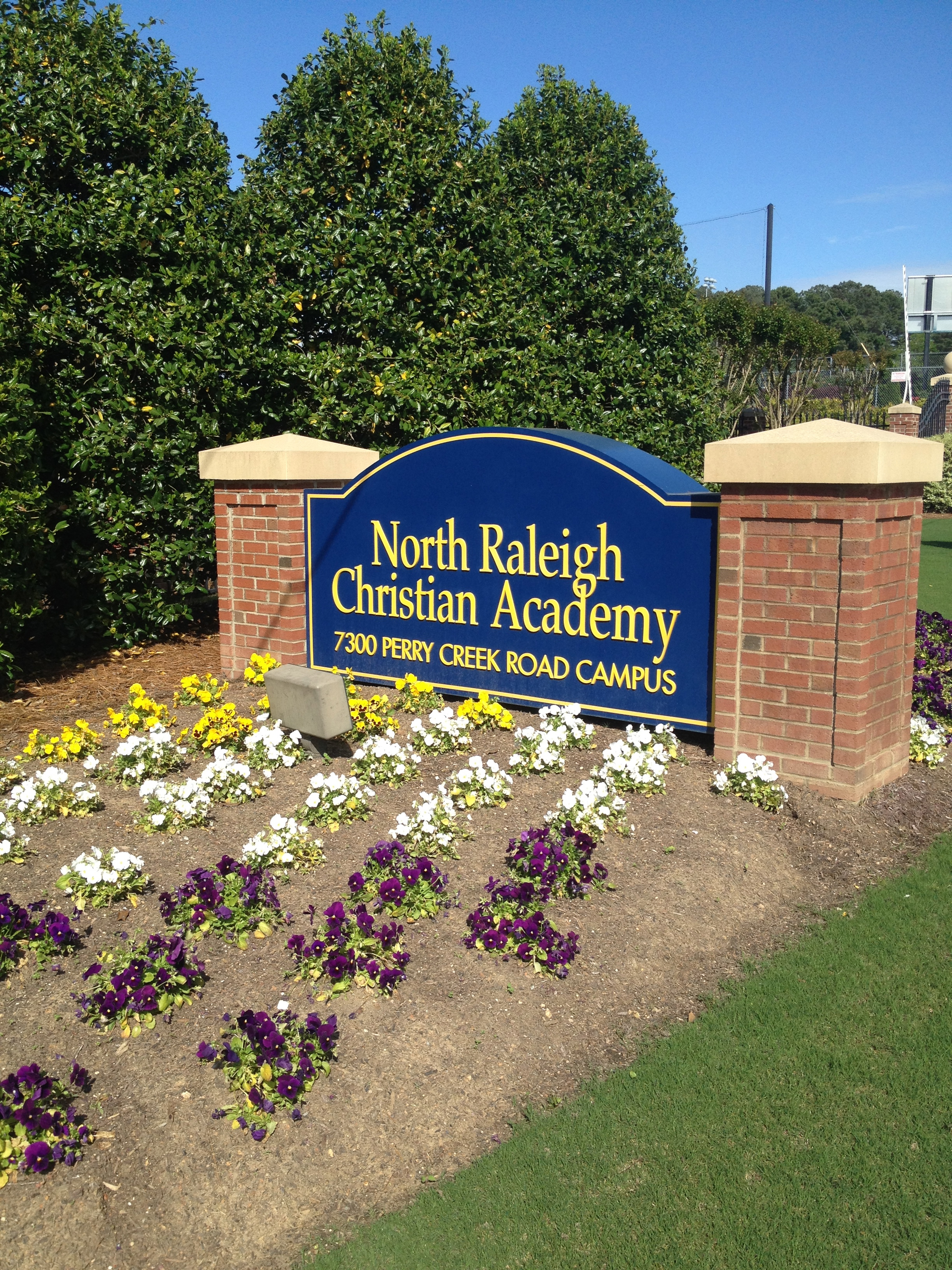

North Raleigh Christian Academy was founded in May 1996 by Dr. S. L. Sherrill and a group of businessmen who wanted to start a Christian School in Raleigh, North Carolina. The original site of the school was Mt. Vernon Baptist Church located in Raleigh, NC, which is now the current site of Neuse Christian Academy. In its first year, NRCA had 400 students in K–12th grade at its "Falls campus" at Mt. Vernon. In 1998, the school began a second campus with K-6th grade at Open Door Baptist Church where over 140 students arrived its first year. Open Door Baptist supported the "Durant campus" as it grew to over 250 students in three years. Total enrollment at both campuses reached 868 by 2001.

In 1999 the school purchased 30 acres (120,000 m^{2}) on Perry Creek Road. The school's Board of Governors began plans for the "Perry Creek campus." Ground was broken in the fall of 2000 for the new campus. The new campus was opened on August 19, 2002.

In 2009 NRCA purchased adjacent land and expanded the school, the project was completed by the start of the 2010–11 school year and has increased enrollment capacity to 1,800 students.

== Academics and curriculum ==
North Raleigh Christian Academy is an ACSI, state-approved, college-preparatory school. The school's accreditations include: SACS (Southern Association of Colleges and Schools), ACSI (Association of Christian Schools International), and CITA (Commission on International and Trans-Regional Accreditation).

The school offers dual-enrollment opportunities through The College at Southeastern, the undergraduate school of Southeastern Baptist Theological Seminary in Wake Forest, NC.

== Notable alumni ==
- Chesson Hadley, professional golfer on the PGA Tour
- Phil Haynes, NFL offensive lineman (attended through Junior year)
- Tyler Marenyi, better known by his stage name, Nghtmre, American DJ and electronic dance music producer
