= Greg Dortch =

American football player (born 1998)

No. 19 – Buffalo Bills
- Position: Wide receiver / Return specialist
- Roster status: Active

Personal information
- Born: May 29, 1998 (age 28); Rochester, New York, U.S.
- Listed height: 5 ft 7 in (1.70 m)
- Listed weight: 175 lb (79 kg)

Career information
- High school: Highland Springs (Highland Springs, Virginia)
- College: Wake Forest (2016–2018)
- NFL draft: 2019: undrafted

Career history
- New York Jets (2019)*; Carolina Panthers (2019); Los Angeles Rams (2019)*; Atlanta Falcons (2020)*; Arizona Cardinals (2021–2025); Detroit Lions (2026)*; Buffalo Bills (2026–present)
- * Offseason or practice squad member only

Awards and highlights
- First-team All-American (2018); First-team All-ACC (2018); Second-team All-ACC (2017); ACC Brian Piccolo Award (2018)

Career NFL statistics as of Week 11, 2026
- Receptions: 145
- Receiving yards: 1,310
- Receiving touchdowns: 10
- Return yards: 3,543
- Rushing yards: 119
- Rushing touchdowns: 1
- Stats at Pro Football Reference

Greg Dortch (born May 29, 1998) is an American professional football wide receiver and return specialist for the Buffalo Bills of the National Football League (NFL). He played college football for the Wake Forest Demon Deacons and was signed by the New York Jets as an undrafted free agent in 2019.

== Early life ==
Dortch was born in Rochester, New York, but later moved to Richmond, Virginia as a small child. Dortch attended Highland Springs High School in Highland Springs, Virginia. He committed to Wake Forest University to play college football.

== College career ==
Dortch redshirted his first year at Wake Forest in 2016. As a redshirt freshman in 2017, he played in eight games and had 53 receptions for 722 yards and nine touchdowns. As a redshirt sophomore in 2018, he had 89 receptions for 1,078 yards and eight touchdowns. The same year, he was named an All-American as a return specialist after recording two punt return touchdowns, as well as earning first-team All-ACC honors. After the season, Dortch decided to forgo the remaining two years of eligibility to pursue a career in the NFL.

=== College statistics ===
Greg Dortch
Year	Rec	Yds	Avg	TD
2017	53	722	13.6	9
2018	89	1,078	12.1	8
Career	142	1,800	12.7	17

== Professional career ==
Pre-draft measurables
Height	Weight	Arm length	Hand span	Wingspan	40-yard dash	10-yard split	20-yard split	20-yard shuttle	Three-cone drill	Vertical jump	Broad jump
5 ft 7 1/8 in (1.70 m)	173 lb (78 kg)	29 1/4 in (0.74 m)	9 1/4 in (0.23 m)	5 ft 11 in (1.80 m)	4.59 s	1.59 s	2.63 s	4.08 s	6.89 s	33.0 in (0.84 m)	9 ft 1 in (2.77 m)
All values from NFL Combine/Pro Day

=== New York Jets ===
Following the conclusion of the 2019 NFL draft, Dortch signed with the New York Jets as an undrafted free agent. He was waived on September 1, 2019, and was re-signed to the practice squad.

=== Carolina Panthers ===
On October 16, 2019, the Carolina Panthers signed Dortch off the Jets' practice squad to their active roster. Dortch made his NFL debut in Week 9 against the Tennessee Titans. He was waived on November 11, and re-signed to the practice squad two days later. Dortch was promoted to the active roster on December 6, but was waived four days later.

=== Los Angeles Rams ===
On December 12, 2019, Dortch was signed to the Los Angeles Rams' practice squad. He signed a reserve/future contract with the Rams on December 31. Dortch was waived by Los Angeles on July 25, 2020.

Dortch visited the Tampa Bay Buccaneers on August 23, 2020.

=== Atlanta Falcons ===
On December 28, 2020, Dortch was signed to the Atlanta Falcons' practice squad. He signed a reserve/future contract with Atlanta on January 4, 2021. Dortch was waived by the Falcons on June 17.

=== Arizona Cardinals ===
On August 3, 2021, Dortch signed with the Arizona Cardinals. He was waived on August 31, and re-signed to the practice squad the next day. He was promoted to the active roster on December 25. He finished the year with three receptions for 15 yards, in five appearances and two starts.

Due to injuries, Dortch began the 2022 season as a starter for the Cardinals. In the first game of the year against the Kansas City Chiefs, he recorded seven catches for 63 yards in the 44–21 loss. In the following game, a 29–23 overtime victory over the Las Vegas Raiders, he scored his first professional touchdown on a five-yard reception from Kyler Murray. In Week 11, against the San Francisco 49ers, he had nine receptions for 103 receiving yards in the 38–10 loss. In the 2022 season, he appeared in 16 games, of which he started four. He finished with 52 receptions for 467 receiving yards and two receiving touchdowns.

Dortch signed a one-year contract extension on March 10, 2023. In Week 12 against the Los Angeles Rams, Dortch scored his first touchdown of the season on a seven–yard pass from Murray.

On April 3, 2024, Dortch signed a one-year exclusive rights tender with the Cardinals.

On March 12, 2025, the Cardinals assigned Dortch's RFA tender, offering him a one-year, $3.3 million contract. In 12 appearances for Arizona, he recorded 29 receptions for 206 yards and three touchdowns. On December 6, Dortch was placed on injured reserve due to a chest injury.

=== Detroit Lions ===
On March 18, 2026, Dortch signed a one-year, $1.4 million contract with the Detroit Lions, reuniting with former offensive coordinator Drew Petzing. On August 30, he was released by the Lions as a part of final roster cuts.

=== Buffalo Bills ===
On August 31, 2026, Dortch signed with the Buffalo Bills' practice squad. On September 12, Dortch was elevated from the practice squad to the active roster for the Bills’ Week 1 game against the Houston Texans at Reliant Stadium. On September 25, Dortch was signed to the active roster.

== NFL career statistics ==
=== Regular season ===
Legend
**Bold**	Career high

Year	Team	Games		Receiving					Rushing					Kick returns					Punt returns					Fumbles	
Year	Team	GP	GS	Rec	Yds	Avg	Lng	TD	Att	Yds	Avg	Lng	TD	Ret	Yds	Avg	Lng	TD	Ret	Yds	Avg	Lng	TD	Fum	Lost
2019	CAR	2	0	0	0	0.0	0	0	0	0	0.0	0	0	5	119	23.8	32	0	4	28	7.0	11	0	1	**1**
2021	ARI	5	2	3	15	5.0	10	0	1	24	**24.0**	**24**	0	4	79	19.8	31	0	3	24	8.0	17	0	0	0
2022	ARI	16	**4**	**52**	**467**	9.0	**47**	**2**	**7**	**44**	6.3	20	0	11	218	19.8	31	0	26	172	6.6	18	0	1	**1**
2023	ARI	16	4	24	266	**12.1**	38	**2**	1	5	5.0	5	0	17	360	21.2	40	0	**29**	**275**	9.5	**49**	0	0	0
2024	ARI	**17**	4	37	342	9.2	39	**3**	5	31	6.2	8	0	7	186	26.6	31	0	21	202	9.6	27	0	**3**	**1**
2025	ARI	12	3	29	206	7.1	39	3	7	15	2.1	9	1	**31**	**811**	26.2	39	0	16	185	**11.6**	40	0	1	0
2026	BUF	10	0	0	0	0.0	0	0	0	0	0.0	0	0	25	699	**28.0**	**58**	0	20	185	9.3	25	0	0	0
Career		76	17	145	1,310	9.0	47	10	21	119	5.7	24	1	100	2,472	24.7	58	0	119	1,071	9.0	49	0	6	3
