= Gerald Willis =

American football player (born 1995)

No. 53, 9
- Position: Defensive tackle

Personal information
- Born: August 23, 1995 (age 31); New Orleans, Louisiana, U.S.
- Listed height: 6 ft 2 in (1.88 m)
- Listed weight: 300 lb (136 kg)

Career information
- High school: Edna Karr (New Orleans)
- College: Florida; Miami (FL)
- NFL draft: 2019: undrafted

Career history
- Baltimore Ravens (2019)*; Miami Dolphins (2019); Green Bay Packers (2020)*; Orlando Guardians (2023); Ottawa Redblacks (2024)*
- * Offseason or practice squad member only

Awards and highlights
- Second-team All-ACC (2018)

Career NFL statistics
- Total tackles: 2
- Stats at Pro Football Reference

Gerald Willis III (born August 23, 1995) is an American former professional football player who was a defensive tackle in the National Football League (NFL). He played college football for the Florida Gators and Miami Hurricanes.

== Early life ==
Willis was born and raised in New Orleans, Louisiana, and attended Edna Karr High School. Willis was a standout defensive tackle for the Cougars high school football team and was named the All-New Orleans Large Schools Defensive Player of the Year twice and was an All-America selection as a senior, when he made 107 tackles, including 43 for a loss and 15 sacks. He was widely considered to be one of the top defensive line prospects in his class and committed to play college football at the University of Florida over offers from Texas, LSU, Florida State, and Alabama, among others.

== College career ==
Willis began his college career at Florida. He appeared in five games as a freshman, making 14 tackles. Willis forced a key red zone fumble in the Gators' 28–20 win in the 2015 Birmingham Bowl over East Carolina. After the season, Florida announced that Willis was dismissed from the team after several on and off the field incidents.

Willis transferred to Miami after his dismissal and sat out the 2015 season due to NCAA transfer rules. As a redshirt sophomore, Willis made 19 tackles, 5.5 tackles for loss and 1.5 sacks in nine games before tearing his MCL, an injury that caused him to miss the entire 2017 season. He was named second-team All-Atlantic Coast Conference (ACC) and named second-team All-America by Sports Illustrated in his redshirt senior season after making 59 tackles, 18 of which were for loss, with four sacks.

== Professional career ==
Pre-draft measurables
Height	Weight	Arm length	Hand span	40-yard dash	10-yard split	20-yard split	Vertical jump	Broad jump	Bench press
6 ft 1 3/4 in (1.87 m)	302 lb (137 kg)	33 in (0.84 m)	8 1/2 in (0.22 m)	5.17 s	1.80 s	3.05 s	27.0 in (0.69 m)	8 ft 7 in (2.62 m)	22 reps
All values from NFL Combine/Pro Day

=== Baltimore Ravens ===
Despite being projected to be a mid-round pick, Willis went unselected in the 2019 NFL draft. He signed with the Baltimore Ravens as an undrafted free agent shortly after the conclusion of the draft on April 27, 2019. Willis was released by the Ravens on August 31, 2019.

=== Miami Dolphins ===
Willis was signed to the Miami Dolphins practice squad on September 2, 2019, but was waived two days later. The Dolphins re-signed Willis to their practice squad on September 23, 2019. He was promoted to the active roster on November 20, 2019. Willis made his NFL debut on November 24, 2019 against the Cleveland Browns. He was placed on injured reserve on December 13, 2019. Willis finished his rookie season with two tackles in two games played. Willis was released by the Dolphins on April 18, 2020.

=== Green Bay Packers ===
Willis was claimed off waivers by the Green Bay Packers on April 21, 2020. He was waived on July 26, 2020.

=== Orlando Guardians ===
On November 17, 2022, Willis was selected by the Orlando Guardians of the XFL. The Guardians folded when the XFL and USFL merged to create the United Football League (UFL).

=== Ottawa Redblacks ===
On April 23, 2024, Willis signed with the Ottawa Redblacks of the Canadian Football League (CFL). He was released on May 7, 2024.

== Personal life ==
Willis is the younger brother of All-Pro safety Landon Collins of the New York Giants.

== NFL career statistics ==
=== Regular season ===
Season	Team	Games		Tackles				
Season	Team	GP	GS	Total	Solo	Ast	Sck	Int
2019	MIA	2	0	2	0	2	0.0	0
Total		2	0	2	0	2	0.0	0
Source: NFL.com
