= Phil Haynes (American football) =

American football player (born 1995)

Profile
- Position: Offensive guard

Personal information
- Born: October 19, 1995 (age 31); Raleigh, North Carolina, U.S.
- Listed height: 6 ft 4 in (1.93 m)
- Listed weight: 322 lb (146 kg)

Career information
- High school: Virginia Episcopal (Lynchburg, Virginia)
- College: Wake Forest (2014–2018)
- NFL draft: 2019: 4th round, 124th overall pick

Career history
- Seattle Seahawks (2019–2023)

Awards and highlights
- Second-team All-ACC (2018)

Career NFL statistics as of 2023
- Games played: 31
- Games started: 13
- Stats at Pro Football Reference

Phil Haynes (born October 19, 1995) is an American professional football offensive guard. He played college football at Wake Forest.

== Early life ==
Haynes grew up in Raleigh, North Carolina and initially attended North Raleigh Christian Academy. He transferred to Virginia Episcopal School in Lynchburg, Virginia after his junior year in order to re-classify and gain an extra season of eligibility. He joined the football team at Virginia Episcopal and attracted the attention of college recruiters, ultimately committing to play college football at Wake Forest despite only playing one year of football. Since he had already reclassified as a junior, Haynes moved back to Raleigh and took extra courses at William G. Enloe High School in order to enter Wake Forest with his original class.

== College career ==
Haynes spent five total seasons as a member of the Wake Forest Demon Deacons, redshirting his true freshman season. He started at right tackle as a redshirt freshman before moving to left guard for his final three seasons. He was named third-team All-Atlantic Coast Conference (ACC) after his redshirt junior season and entered his redshirt senior year on the 2018 Outland Trophy watchlist. Over the course of his collegiate career, Haynes started 47 games for the Demon Deacons.

== Professional career ==
Pre-draft measurables
Height	Weight	Arm length	Hand span	40-yard dash	10-yard split	20-yard split	20-yard shuttle	Three-cone drill	Vertical jump	Broad jump	Bench press
6 ft 3 5/8 in (1.92 m)	322 lb (146 kg)	33 1/2 in (0.85 m)	9 1/2 in (0.24 m)	5.20 s	1.78 s	2.97 s	4.57 s	7.76 s	31.0 in (0.79 m)	9 ft 0 in (2.74 m)	33 reps
All values from NFL Combine/Pro Day

Haynes was drafted by the Seattle Seahawks in the fourth round (124th overall) of the 2019 NFL draft. He was placed on the reserve/physically unable to perform (PUP) list to start the season while recovering from sports hernia surgery. Hayes was activated from the PUP list on November 5, 2019. After not appearing in a game during the regular season, Haynes made his NFL debut on January 5, 2020, in a 17-9 win in the Wildcard round of the postseason against the Philadelphia Eagles.

On September 7, 2020, Haynes was placed on injured reserve. He was activated on November 18, 2020. He was placed back on injured reserve on December 24, 2020.

On September 1, 2021, Haynes was waived by the Seahawks and re-signed to the practice squad. He was promoted to the active roster on November 27.

On March 12, 2022, the Seahawks placed an original-round restricted free agent tender on Haynes, which he signed on April 19.

Haynes signed a one-year contract extension with the Seahawks on February 21, 2023. He was named the starting right guard to begin the season, starting eight games before being placed on injured reserve on November 30, 2023, with a toe injury.
