= 2018 Atlantic Coast Conference football season =

2018 ACC Football season
- League: NCAA Division I Football Bowl Subdivision
- Sport: Football
- Duration: August 30, 2018 to January 7, 2019
- Teams: 14

2019 NFL Draft
- Top draft pick: Clelin Ferrell – (Clemson)
- Picked by: Oakland Raiders, 4th Overall

Regular Season
- Atlantic champions: Clemson
- Atlantic runners-up: Syracuse
- Coastal champions: Pittsburgh
- Coastal runners-up: Georgia Tech

ACC Championship Game
- Champions: Clemson
- Runners-up: Pittsburgh
- Finals MVP: Travis Etienne, RB - Clemson

Seasons
- ← 2017 2019 →

2018 Atlantic Coast Conference football standings
	Conf.			Overall
Team	W		L	W		L
Atlantic Division
No. 1 Clemson x$#^	8	–	0	15	–	0
No. 15 Syracuse	6	–	2	10	–	3
NC State	5	–	3	9	–	4
Boston College	4	–	4	7	–	5
Wake Forest	3	–	5	7	–	6
Florida State	3	–	5	5	–	7
Louisville	0	–	8	2	–	10
Coastal Division
Pittsburgh x	6	–	2	7	–	7
Georgia Tech	5	–	3	7	–	6
Miami (FL)	4	–	4	7	–	6
Virginia	4	–	4	8	–	5
Virginia Tech	4	–	4	6	–	7
Duke	3	–	5	8	–	5
North Carolina	1	–	7	2	–	9
Championship: Clemson 42, Pittsburgh 10
# – College Football Playoff champion; ^ – College Football Playoff participant; $ – Conference champion; x – Division champion/co-champions; Rankings from AP Poll

The 2018 Atlantic Coast Conference football season was the 66th season of College Football play for the Atlantic Coast Conference (ACC). It was played from August 30, 2018 until January 2019. The Atlantic Coast Conference consists of 14 members in two divisions. It was part of the 2018 NCAA Division I FBS football season. The entire 2018 schedule was released on January 17, 2018.

== Preseason ==
=== ACC Media days ===
The 2018 ACC Football Kickoff event was held on July 18 & 19 at the Westin Hotel in Charlotte, North Carolina. On July 6, the ACC announced 28 student athletes from 14 schools that addressed the media at the kickoff event. Press also released preseason polls (shown below) at the event.

==== Preseason Poll ====
The 2018 ACC Preseason Poll was announced following the ACC Football Kickoff event. Clemson and Miami were selected to win the Atlantic Division and Coastal Division, respectively. Clemson was selected the favorite to win the ACC Championship, receiving 139 out of 148 votes, or 94% of the vote. The poll was voted on by 148 media members, all of which were in attendance for the ACC Football Kickoff.

ACC Championship Votes

1. Clemson – 139
2. Miami – 5
3. NC State – 2
4. Virginia Tech, Florida State – 1

Atlantic Division
1. Clemson – 1,031 (145 First place votes)
2. Florida State – 789 (1)
3. NC State – 712 (2)
4. Boston College – 545
5. Louisville – 422
6. Wake Forest – 413
7. Syracuse – 232
Coastal Division
1. Miami – 998 (122)
2. Virginia Tech – 838 (16)
3. Georgia Tech – 654 (8)
4. Duke – 607 (1)
5. Pittsburgh – 420
6. North Carolina – 370 (1)
7. Virginia – 257

==== Preseason ACC Player of the year ====
1 A. J. Dillon (RB) - Boston College - 45
2 Christian Wilkins (DT) - Clemson - 42
3 Ryan Finley (QB) - NC State - 37
4 Cam Akers (RB) - Florida State - 13
5 Greg Dortch (WR) - Wake Forest – 3
T6 Joe Giles-Harris (LB) - Duke, TaQuon Marshall (QB) - Georgia Tech – 2
T8 Zach Allen - (DE) - Boston College, Eric Dungey (QB) - Syracuse, Jaylen Smith (WR) - Louisville, Olamide Zaccheaus (HB) - Virginia – 1

==== Preseason All Conference Teams ====
===== Offense =====
Position	Player	School	Votes
Wide receiver	Jaylen Smith	Louisville	90
Wide receiver	Kelvin Harmon	NC State	71
Wide receiver	Hunter Renfrow	Clemson	62
Tight end	Tommy Sweeney	Boston College	106
Advanced Playmaker	Greg Dortch	Wake Forest	64
Tackle	Mitch Hyatt	Clemson	130
Tackle	Chris Lindstrom	Boston College	72
Guard	Parker Braun	Georgia Tech	83
Guard	Phil Haynes	Wake Forest	65
Center	Justin Falcinelli	Clemson	56
Quarterback	Ryan Finley	NC State	102
Running back	A. J. Dillon	Boston College	112
Running back	Cam Akers	Florida State	94

===== Defense =====
Position	Player	School	Votes
Defensive end	Clelin Ferrell	Clemson	122
Defensive end	Austin Bryant	Clemson	80
Defensive tackle	Christian Wilkins	Clemson	122
Defensive tackle	Dexter Lawrence	Clemson	119
Linebacker	Joe Giles-Harris	Duke	103
Linebacker	Shaquille Quarterman	Miami	98
Linebacker	Kendall Joseph	Clemson	84
Cornerback	Mark Gilbert	Duke	84
Cornerback	Michael Jackson	Miami	68
Safety	Jaquan Johnson	Miami	103
Safety	Lukas Denis	Boston College	64

===== Specialist =====
Position	Player	School	Votes
Placekicker	Ricky Aguayo	Florida State	119
Punter	Sterling Hofrichter	Syracuse	33
Specialist	Anthony Ratliff-Williams	North Carolina	97

=== Recruiting classes ===
Rankings
Team	ESPN	Rivals	24/7	Signees
Boston College	62	69	67	20
Clemson	5	8	6	17
Duke	61	64	61	16
Florida State	11	10	11	21
Georgia Tech	53	52	51	21
Louisville	28	31	29	23
Miami	8	6	8	23
North Carolina	26	23	23	21
NC State	29	34	26	24
Pittsburgh	56	36	46	20
Syracuse	52	63	46	20
Virginia	57	66	64	20
Virginia Tech	22	22	24	26
Wake Forest	60	60	60	22

== Coaches ==
Team	Head coach	Years at school	Overall record	Record at school	ACC record
Boston College	Steve Addazio	6	44–44	31–33	15–25
Clemson	Dabo Swinney	11	101–30	101–30	61–16
Duke	David Cutcliffe	11	103–96	59–67	28–52
Florida State	Willie Taggart	1	47–50	0–0	0–0
Georgia Tech	Paul Johnson	11	182–93	75–54	46–34
Louisville	Bobby Petrino	9	117–48	75–27	45–17
Miami	Mark Richt	3	164–58	19–7	12–4
North Carolina	Larry Fedora	7	77–53	43–34	27–21
NC State	Dave Doeren	6	57–34	34–30	15–25
Pittsburgh	Pat Narduzzi	4	21–17	21–17	14–10
Syracuse	Dino Babers	3	45–32	8–16	4-12
Virginia	Bronco Mendenhall	3	107–60	8–17	4–12
Virginia Tech	Justin Fuente	3	45–31	19–8	11–5
Wake Forest	Dave Clawson	5	111–108	21–29	9–23

Notes:

- Records shown are prior to the 2018 season.
- Years at school includes the 2018 season.

== Rankings ==
Legend
	Improvement in ranking
	Drop in ranking
	Not ranked previous week
RV	Received votes but were not ranked in Top 25 of poll

		Pre	Wk 1	Wk 2	Wk 3	Wk 4	Wk 5	Wk 6	Wk 7	Wk 8	Wk 9	Wk 10	Wk 11	Wk 12	Wk 13	Wk 14	Final
Boston College	AP	RV	RV	RV	23		RV			RV	24	17	22				
Boston College	C	RV	RV	RV	25	RV	RV		RV		25	14	22	RV			
Boston College	CFP	Not released									21	17	20				
Clemson	AP	2 (18)	2 (12)	2 (6)	3	3 (1)	4 (1)	4 (2)	3	2	2	2	2	2	2	2	1 (61)
Clemson	C	2 (3)	2 (3)	2 (3)	2 (2)	2 (2)	4 (2)	4 (2)	3 (2)	2 (2)	2 (2)	2 (1)	2 (1)	2 (1)	2 (1)	2 (2)	1 (64)
Clemson	CFP	Not released									2	2	2	2	2	2	
Duke	AP			RV	RV	22	RV		RV			RV	RV				
Duke	C	RV	RV	RV	RV	23	RV	RV	RV	RV	RV	RV	RV	RV			RV
Duke	CFP	Not released															
Florida State	AP	19	RV	RV													
Florida State	C	19	RV	RV													
Florida State	CFP	Not released															
Georgia Tech	AP																
Georgia Tech	C		RV														
Georgia Tech	CFP	Not released															
Louisville	AP																
Louisville	C	RV															
Louisville	CFP	Not released															
Miami	AP	8	22	21	20	16	17	16	RV	RV							
Miami	C	8	21	20	21	16	17	15	RV	25	RV						
Miami	CFP	Not released															
North Carolina	AP																
North Carolina	C																
North Carolina	CFP	Not released															
NC State	AP	RV	RV	RV	RV	RV	23	20	16	22	RV	22	RV	RV	RV	RV	RV
NC State	C	RV	RV	RV	RV	RV	25	19	15	22	RV	22	RV	RV	RV	RV	RV
NC State	CFP	Not released									21	14					
Pittsburgh	AP												RV	24			
Pittsburgh	C										RV	RV	RV	25	RV		
Pittsburgh	CFP	Not released												24			
Syracuse	AP				RV	RV	RV				22	13	12	19	18	17	15
Syracuse	C				RV	RV	RV			RV	24	13	12	19	18	17	15
Syracuse	CFP	Not released									19	13	12	20	20	20	
Virginia	AP								RV	RV	23						
Virginia	C					RV			RV	RV	22		RV	RV			RV
Virginia	CFP	Not released									25						
Virginia Tech	AP	20	12	13	13	RV	24										
Virginia Tech	C	17	14	11	10	24	23	RV	RV	RV	RV						
Virginia Tech	CFP	Not released															
Wake Forest	AP																
Wake Forest	C																
Wake Forest	CFP	Not released															

== Schedule ==
Index to colors and formatting
ACC member won
ACC member lost
ACC teams in **bold**

† denotes Homecoming game

=== Regular season ===
==== Week one ====
Date	Time	Visiting team	Home team	Site	TV	Result	Attendance	Ref.
August 30	8:00 p.m.	**Wake Forest**	Tulane	Yulman Stadium • New Orleans, LA	CBSSN	**W** 23–17 ^{OT}	15,478	
August 31	6:00 p.m.	**Syracuse**	Western Michigan	Waldo Stadium • Kalamazoo, MI	CBSSN	**W** 55–42	20,628	
September 1	12:00 p.m.	No. 2 (FCS) James Madison	**NC State**	Carter–Finley Stadium • Raleigh, NC	ESPNU	**W** 24–13	56,073	
September 1	12:20 p.m.	No. 23 (FCS) Furman	No. 2 **Clemson**	Memorial Stadium • Clemson, SC	ACCN	**W** 48–7	80,048	
September 1	12:30 p.m.	Alcorn State	**Georgia Tech**	Bobby Dodd Stadium • Atlanta, GA	RSN	**W** 41–0	39,719	
September 1	1:00 p.m.	UMass	**Boston College**	Alumni Stadium • Chestnut Hill, MA (Rivalry)	ACCN Extra	**W** 55–21	30,112	
September 1	3:30 p.m.	Albany	**Pittsburgh**	Heinz Field • Pittsburgh, PA	ACCN Extra	**W** 33–7	34,486	
September 1	4:00 p.m.	**North Carolina**	Cal	California Memorial Stadium • Berkeley, CA	Fox	**L** 17–24	42,168	
September 1	6:00 p.m.	Richmond	**Virginia**	Scott Stadium • Charlottesville, VA	ACCN Extra	**W** 42–13	40,524	
September 1	7:00 p.m.	Army	**Duke**	Wallace Wade Stadium • Durham, NC	ESPNU	**W** 34–14	26,017	
September 1	8:00 p.m.	No. 1 Alabama	**Louisville**	Camping World Stadium • Orlando, FL (Camping World Kickoff)	ABC	**L** 14–51	57,280	
September 2	7:30 p.m.	No. 25 LSU	No. 8 **Miami**	AT&T Stadium • Arlington, TX (Advocare Classic)	ABC	**L** 17–33	68,841	
September 3	8:00 p.m.	No. 20 **Virginia Tech**	No. 19 **Florida State**	Doak Campbell Stadium • Tallahassee, FL	ESPN	**VT** 24–3	75,237	
^{#}Rankings from AP Poll released prior to game. All times are in Eastern Time.

==== Week two ====
Date	Time	Visiting team	Home team	Site	TV	Result	Attendance	Ref.
September 8	12:00 p.m.	**Georgia Tech**	South Florida	Raymond James Stadium • Tampa, FL	ABC/ESPN2	**L** 38–49	34,182	
September 8	12:00 p.m.	**Duke**	Northwestern	Ryan Field • Evanston, IL	ESPNU	**W** 21–7	40,654	
September 8	12:00 p.m.	Towson	**Wake Forest**	BB&T Field • Winston-Salem, NC	ACCN Extra	**W** 51–20	23,619	
September 8	12:30 p.m.	Georgia State	**NC State**	Carter–Finley Stadium • Raleigh, NC	RSN	**W** 41–7	56,017	
September 8	1:00 p.m.	Holy Cross	**Boston College**	Alumni Stadium • Chestnut Hill, MA (Rivalry)	ACCN Extra	**W** 62–14	40,311	
September 8	2:00 p.m.	William & Mary	No. 12 **Virginia Tech**	Lane Stadium • Blacksburg, VA	ACCN Extra	**W** 62–17	65,632	
September 8	3:30 p.m.	**North Carolina**	East Carolina	Dowdy–Ficklen Stadium • Greenville, NC	ESPNU	**L** 14–41	39,298	
September 8	3:30 p.m.	Wagner	**Syracuse**	Carrier Dome • Syracuse, NY	ACCN Extra	**W** 62–10	29,395	
September 8	6:00 p.m.	Savannah State	No. 22 **Miami**	Hard Rock Stadium • Miami Gardens, FL	ACCN Extra	**W** 77–0	60,307	
September 8	7:00 p.m.	No. 2 **Clemson**	Texas A&M	Kyle Field • College Station, TX	ESPN	**W** 28–26	104,794	
September 8	7:00 p.m.	Indiana State	**Louisville**	Cardinal Stadium • Louisville, KY	ACCN Extra	**W** 31–7	44,520	
September 8	7:20 p.m.	Samford	**Florida State**	Doak Campbell Stadium • Tallahassee, FL	ACCN	**W** 36–26	72,239	
September 8	7:30 p.m.	**Virginia**	Indiana	Memorial Stadium • Bloomington, IN	BTN	**L** 16–20	35,492	
September 8	8:00 p.m.	No. 13 Penn State	**Pittsburgh**	Heinz Field • Pittsburgh, PA (Rivalry)	ABC	**L** 6–51	68,400	
^{#}Rankings from AP Poll released prior to game. All times are in Eastern Time.

==== Week three ====
Date	Time	Visiting team	Home team	Site	TV	Result	Attendance	Ref.
September 13	5:30 p.m.	**Boston College**	**Wake Forest**	BB&T Field • Winston-Salem, NC	ESPN	**BC** 41–34	25,309	
September 15	12:00 p.m.	**Florida State**	**Syracuse**	Carrier Dome • Syracuse, NY	ESPN	**CUSE** 30–7	37,457	
September 15	12:00 p.m.	Georgia Southern	No. 2 **Clemson**	Memorial Stadium • Clemson, SC	ESPNU	**W** 38–7	79,844	
September 15	12:00 p.m.	No. 21 **Miami**	Toledo	Glass Bowl • Toledo, OH	ESPN2	**W** 49–24	28,117	
~~September 15~~	~~12:00 p.m.~~	~~No. 18 UCF~~	~~**North Carolina**~~	~~Kenan Memorial Stadium~~ • ~~Chapel Hill, NC~~	~~ESPNU~~	**Cancelled** (Note: This game has been cancelled in anticipation of Hurricane Florence.)		
~~September 15~~	~~12:20 p.m.~~	~~East Carolina~~	~~No. 13 **Virginia Tech**~~	~~Lane Stadium~~ • ~~Blacksburg, VA~~	~~ACCN~~	**Cancelled**		
September 15	12:30 p.m.	**Georgia Tech**	**Pittsburgh**	Heinz Field • Pittsburgh, PA	RSN	**PITT** 24–19	34,284	
September 15	2:30 p.m.	**Duke**	Baylor	McLane Stadium • Waco, TX	FS1	**W** 40–27	40,442	
~~September 15~~	~~3:30 p.m.~~	~~No. 14 West Virginia~~	~~**NC State**~~	~~Carter–Finley Stadium~~ • ~~Raleigh, NC~~	~~ESPNU~~	**Cancelled**		
September 15	4:15 p.m.	Ohio	**Virginia**	Vanderbilt Stadium • Nashville, TN (Note: Moved from Scott Stadium in anticipation of Hurricane Florence.)	ESPN2	**W** 45–31	5,438	
September 15	7:30 p.m.	Western Kentucky	**Louisville**	Cardinal Stadium • Louisville, KY	RSN	**W** 20–17	54,923	
^{#}Rankings from AP Poll released prior to game. All times are in Eastern Time.

==== Week four ====
Date	Time	Visiting team	Home team	Site	TV	Result	Attendance	Ref.
September 22	12:00 p.m.	No. 23 **Boston College**	Purdue	Ross–Ade Stadium • West Lafayette, IN	ESPN2	**L** 13–30	47,119	
September 22	12:00 p.m.	No. 8 Notre Dame	**Wake Forest**	BB&T Stadium • Winston-Salem, NC	ABC	**L** 27–56	31,092	
September 22	12:20 p.m.	**Pittsburgh**	**North Carolina**	Kenan Memorial Stadium • Chapel Hill, NC	ACCN	**UNC** 38–35	44,168	
September 22	12:30 p.m.	**Louisville**	**Virginia**	Scott Stadium • Charlottesville, VA	RSN	**UVA** 27–3	34,446	
September 22	3:30 p.m.	No. 3 **Clemson**	**Georgia Tech**	Bobby Dodd Stadium • Atlanta, GA	ABC	**CLEM** 49–21	50,595	
September 22	3:30 p.m.	FIU	No. 21 **Miami**	Hard Rock Stadium • Miami Gardens, FL	ESPN2	**W** 31–17	59,814	
September 22	3:30 p.m.	North Carolina Central	**Duke** †	Wallace Wade Stadium • Durham, NC	ACCN Extra	**W** 55–13	30,477	
September 22	3:30 p.m.	Northern Illinois	**Florida State**	Doak Campbell Stadium • Tallahassee, FL	ESPNU	**W** 37–19	65,633	
September 22	3:30 p.m.	No. 13 **Virginia Tech**	Old Dominion	Foreman Field • Norfolk, VA	CBSSN	**L** 35–49	20,532	
September 22	4:00 p.m.	Connecticut	**Syracuse**	Carrier Dome • Syracuse, NY	ESPNews	**W** 51–21	36,632	
September 22	7:00 p.m.	**NC State**	Marshall	Joan C. Edwards Stadium • Huntington, WV	CBSSN	**W** 37–20	32,349	
^{#}Rankings from AP Poll released prior to game. All times are in Eastern Time.

==== Week five ====
Date	Time	Visiting team	Home team	Site	TV	Result	Attendance	Ref.
September 27	8:00 p.m.	**North Carolina**	No. 16 **Miami**	Hard Rock Stadium • Miami Gardens, FL	ESPN	**MIA** 47–10	60,845	
September 29	12:00 p.m.	Bowling Green	**Georgia Tech**	Bobby Dodd Stadium • Atlanta, GA	RSN	**W** 63–17	40,740	
September 29	12:00 p.m.	**Syracuse**	No. 3 **Clemson**	Memorial Stadium • Clemson, SC	ABC	**CLEM** 27–23	80,122	
September 29	12:00 p.m.	Temple	**Boston College**	Alumni Stadium • Chestnut Hill, MA	ESPNU	**W** 45–35	40,111	
September 29	12:20 p.m.	**Virginia**	**NC State**	Carter–Finley Stadium • Raleigh, NC	ACCN	**NCSU** 35–21	57,600	
September 29	3:30 p.m.	**Florida State**	**Louisville**	Cardinal Stadium • Louisville, KY	ESPN2	**FSU** 28–24	52,798	
September 29	3:30 p.m.	**Pittsburgh**	No. 13 UCF	Spectrum Stadium • Orlando, FL	ESPNU	**L** 14–45	44,904	
September 29	3:30 p.m.	Rice	**Wake Forest**	BB&T Stadium • Winston-Salem, NC	RSN	**W** 56–24	24,519	
September 29	7:00 p.m.	**Virginia Tech**	No. 22 **Duke**	Wallace Wade Stadium • Durham, NC	ESPNU	**VT** 31–14	32,177	
^{#}Rankings from AP Poll released prior to game. All times are in Eastern Time.

==== Week six ====
Date	Time	Visiting team	Home team	Site	TV	Result	Attendance	Ref.
October 5	7:00 p.m.	**Georgia Tech**	**Louisville**	Cardinal Stadium • Louisville, KY	ESPN	**GT** 66–31	51,658	
October 6	12:20 p.m.	**Syracuse**	**Pittsburgh** †	Heinz Field • Pittsburgh, PA	ACCN	**PITT** 44–37 ^{OT}	37,100	
October 6	12:30 p.m.	**Boston College**	No. 23 **NC State**	Carter–Finley Stadium • Raleigh, NC	RSN	**NCSU** 28–23	57,241	
October 6	3:30 p.m.	No. 4 **Clemson**	**Wake Forest**	BB&T Stadium • Winston-Salem, NC	ESPN	**CLEM** 63–3	31,608	
October 6	3:30 p.m.	**Florida State**	No. 17 **Miami**	Hard Rock Stadium • Miami Gardens, FL (Rivalry)	ABC	**MIA** 28–27	65,490	
October 6	8:00 p.m.	No. 6 Notre Dame	No. 24 **Virginia Tech**	Lane Stadium • Blacksburg, VA	ABC	**L** 23–45	65,632	
^{#}Rankings from AP Poll released prior to game. All times are in Eastern Time.

Date	Bye Week		
October 6	Duke	North Carolina	Virginia

==== Week seven ====
Date	Time	Visiting team	Home team	Site	TV	Result	Attendance	Ref.
October 13	12:20 p.m.	**Duke**	**Georgia Tech** †	Bobby Dodd Stadium • Atlanta, GA	ACCN	**DUKE** 28–14	41,709	
October 13	12:30 p.m.	**Louisville**	**Boston College** †	Alumni Stadium • Chestnut Hill, MA	RSN	**BC** 38–20	31,478	
October 13	2:30 p.m.	**Pittsburgh**	No. 5 Notre Dame	Notre Dame Stadium • South Bend, IN (Rivalry)	NBC	**L** 14–19	77,622	
October 13	7:00 p.m.	No. 16 **Miami**	**Virginia** †	Scott Stadium • Charlottesville, VA	ESPN2	**UVA** 16–13	42,393	
October 13	7:00 p.m.	**Virginia Tech**	**North Carolina**	Kenan Memorial Stadium • Chapel Hill, NC	ESPNU	**VT** 22–19	50,500	
^{#}Rankings from AP Poll released prior to game. All times are in Eastern Time.

Date	Bye Week				
October 13	No. 4 Clemson	Florida State	No. 20 NC State	Syracuse	Wake Forest

==== Week eight ====
Date	Time	Visiting team	Home team	Site	TV	Result	Attendance	Ref.
October 20	12:20 p.m.	**North Carolina**	**Syracuse** †	Carrier Dome • Syracuse, NY	ACCN	**CUSE** 40–37 ^{2OT}	35,210	
October 20	12:30 p.m.	**Virginia**	**Duke**	Wallace Wade Stadium • Durham, NC	RSN	**UVA** 28–14	20,277	
October 20	3:30 p.m.	**Wake Forest**	**Florida State** †	Doak Campbell Stadium • Tallahassee, FL	ESPN2	**FSU** 38–17	67,274	
October 20	3:30 p.m.	No. 16 **NC State**	No. 3 **Clemson** †	Memorial Stadium • Clemson, SC (Textile Bowl)	ESPN	**CLEM** 41–7	81,295	
^{#}Rankings from AP Poll released prior to game. All times are in Eastern Time.

Date	Bye Week					
October 20	Boston College	Louisville	Georgia Tech	Miami	Pittsburgh	Virginia Tech

==== Week nine ====
Date	Time	Visiting team	Home team	Site	TV	Result	Attendance	Ref.
October 25	7:30 p.m.	**Georgia Tech**	**Virginia Tech**	Lane Stadium • Blacksburg, VA	ESPN	**GT** 49–28	65,632	
October 26	7:00 p.m.	**Miami**	**Boston College**	Alumni Stadium • Chestnut Hill, MA	ESPN	**BC** 27–14	44,514	
October 27	12:00 p.m.	No. 2 **Clemson**	**Florida State**	Doak Campbell Stadium • Tallahassee, FL (Rivalry)	ABC	**CLEM** 59–10	68,403	
October 27	12:00 p.m.	**Wake Forest**	**Louisville** †	Cardinal Stadium • Louisville, KY	RSN	**WAKE** 56–35	49,603	
October 27	12:20 p.m.	**North Carolina**	**Virginia**	Scott Stadium • Charlottesville, VA	ACCN	**UVA** 31–21	43,128	
October 27	3:30 p.m.	**Duke**	**Pittsburgh**	Heinz Field • Pittsburgh, PA	RSN	**PITT** 54–45	31,510	
October 27	7:00 p.m.	No. 22 **NC State**	**Syracuse**	Carrier Dome • Syracuse, NY	ESPN2	**CUSE** 51–44	40,769	
^{#}Rankings from AP Poll released prior to game. All times are in Eastern Time.

==== Week ten ====
Date	Time	Visiting team	Home team	Site	TV	Result	Attendance	Ref.
November 2	7:30 p.m.	**Pittsburgh**	No. 23 **Virginia**	Scott Stadium • Charlottesville, VA	ESPN2	**PITT** 23–13	36,256	
November 3	12:00 p.m.	**Louisville**	No. 2 **Clemson**	Memorial Stadium • Clemson, SC	ABC	**CLEM** 77–16	78,741	
November 3	12:00 p.m.	No. 22 **Syracuse**	**Wake Forest** †	BB&T Stadium • Winston-Salem, NC	RSN	**CUSE** 41–24	26,136	
November 3	12:15 p.m.	**Georgia Tech**	**North Carolina** †	Kenan Memorial Stadium • Chapel Hill, NC	ACCN	**GT** 38–28	40,782	
November 3	3:30 p.m.	**Florida State**	**NC State** †	Carter–Finley Stadium • Raleigh, NC	ABC	**NCST** 47–28	57,600	
November 3	3:45 p.m.	No. 24 **Boston College**	**Virginia Tech** †	Lane Stadium • Blacksburg, VA (Rivalry)	ACCN	**BC** 31–21	65,632	
November 3	7:00 p.m.	**Duke**	**Miami** †	Hard Rock Stadium • Miami Gardens, FL	ESPN2	**DUKE** 20–12	62,326	
^{#}Rankings from AP Poll released prior to game. All times are in Eastern Time.

==== Week eleven ====
Date	Time	Visiting team	Home team	Site	TV	Result	Attendance	Ref.
November 8	7:30 p.m.	**Wake Forest**	No. 22 **NC State**	Carter–Finley Stadium • Raleigh, NC (Rivalry, Tobacco Road)	ESPN	**WAKE** 27–23	56,228	
November 9	7:00 p.m.	**Louisville**	No. 13 **Syracuse**	Carrier Dome • Syracuse, NY	ESPN	**CUSE** 54–23	42,797	
November 10	12:20 p.m.	**North Carolina**	**Duke**	Wallace Wade Stadium • Durham, NC (Victory Bell)	ACCN	**DUKE** 42–35	35,493	
November 10	3:00 p.m.	Liberty	**Virginia**	Scott Stadium • Charlottesville, VA	RSN	**W** 45–24	41,485	
November 10	3:30 p.m.	**Virginia Tech**	**Pittsburgh**	Heinz Field • Pittsburgh, PA	ESPNU	**PITT** 52–22	44,398	
November 10	7:00 p.m.	**Miami**	**Georgia Tech**	Bobby Dodd Stadium • Atlanta, GA	ESPN2	**GT** 27–21	48,217	
November 10	7:30 p.m.	**Florida State**	No. 3 Notre Dame	Notre Dame Stadium • South Bend, IN	NBC	**L** 13–42	77,622	
November 10	8:00 p.m.	No. 2 **Clemson**	No. 17 **Boston College**	Alumni Stadium • Chestnut Hill, MA (O'Rourke–McFadden Trophy)	ABC	**CLEM** 27–7	44,500	
^{#}Rankings from AP Poll released prior to game. All times are in Eastern Time.

==== Week twelve ====
Date	Time	Visiting team	Home team	Site	TV	Result	Attendance	Ref.
November 17	12:00 p.m.	**Pittsburgh**	**Wake Forest**	BB&T Stadium • Winston-Salem, NC	RSN	**PITT** 34–13	25,609	
November 17	12:20 p.m.	**NC State**	**Louisville**	Cardinal Stadium • Louisville, KY	ACCN	**NCSU** 52–10	48,265	
November 17	2:30 p.m.	No. 12 **Syracuse**	No. 3 Notre Dame	Yankee Stadium • Bronx, NY	NBC	**L** 3–36	48,104	
November 17	3:00 p.m.	Western Carolina	**North Carolina**	Kenan Memorial Stadium • Chapel Hill, NC	ACCN Extra	**W** 49–26	41,151	
November 17	3:30 p.m.	**Virginia**	**Georgia Tech**	Bobby Dodd Stadium • Atlanta, GA	RSN	**GT** 30–27 ^{OT}	37,543	
November 17	3:30 p.m.	No. 22 **Boston College**	**Florida State**	Doak Campbell Stadium • Tallahassee, FL	ESPN2	**FSU** 22–21	57,274	
November 17	3:30 p.m.	**Miami**	**Virginia Tech**	Lane Stadium • Blacksburg, VA	ESPN	**MIA** 38–14	62,379	
November 17	7:00 p.m.	**Duke**	No. 2 **Clemson**	Memorial Stadium • Clemson, SC	ESPN	**CLEM** 35–6	81,313	
^{#}Rankings from AP Poll released prior to game. All times are in Eastern Time.

==== Week thirteen ====
Date	Time	Visiting team	Home team	Site	TV	Result	Attendance	Ref.
November 23	3:30 p.m.	**Virginia**	**Virginia Tech**	Lane Stadium • Blacksburg, VA (Commonwealth Cup)	ABC	**VT** 34–31 ^{OT}	60,776	
November 24	12:00 p.m.	**Georgia Tech**	No. 5 Georgia	Sanford Stadium • Athens, GA (Clean, Old-Fashioned Hate)	SECN	**L** 21–45	92,746	
November 24	12:00 p.m.	No. 13 Florida	**Florida State**	Doak Campbell Stadium • Tallahassee, FL (Rivalry)	ABC	**L** 14–41	71,953	
November 24	12:00 p.m.	No. 19 **Syracuse**	**Boston College**	Alumni Stadium • Chestnut Hill, MA (Rivalry)	ESPN	**CUSE** 42–21	34,959	
November 24	12:20 p.m.	**NC State**	**North Carolina**	Kenan Memorial Stadium • Chapel Hill, NC (Rivalry)	ACCN	**NCSU** 34–28 ^{OT}	41,510	
November 24	12:30 p.m.	**Wake Forest**	**Duke**	Wallace Wade Stadium • Durham, NC	RSN	**WAKE** 59–7	20,782	
November 24	3:30 p.m.	No. 24 **Pittsburgh**	**Miami**	Hard Rock Stadium • Miami Gardens, FL	ESPN	**MIA** 24–3	59,606	
November 24	7:00 p.m.	No. 17 Kentucky	**Louisville**	Cardinal Stadium • Louisville, KY (Governor's Cup)	ESPN2	**L** 10–56	49,988	
November 24	7:00 p.m.	South Carolina	No. 2 **Clemson**	Memorial Stadium • Clemson, SC (Palmetto Bowl)	ESPN	**W** 56–35	81,436	
^{#}Rankings from AP Poll released prior to game. All times are in Eastern Time.

==== Week fourteen ====
Date	Time	Visiting team	Home team	Site	TV	Result	Attendance	Ref.
December 1 (Note: Scheduled due to missed game from Hurricane Florence.)	12:00 p.m.	East Carolina	**NC State**	Carter–Finley Stadium • Raleigh, NC (Victory Barrel)	ACCN Extra	**W** 58–3	57,223	
December 1 (Note: Scheduled due to missed game from Hurricane Florence.)	12:00 p.m.	Marshall	**Virginia Tech**	Lane Stadium • Blacksburg, VA	ACCN Extra	**W** 41–20	31,336	
^{#}Rankings from AP Poll released prior to game. All times are in Eastern Time.

== Championship game ==
Date	Time	Visiting team	Home team	Site	Broadcast	Result	Attendance	Reference
December 1	8:00 p.m.	No. 2 Clemson	Pittsburgh	Bank of America Stadium • Charlotte, NC	ABC	CLEM 42–10	67,784	

== ACC vs other conferences ==
=== ACC vs Power 5 matchups ===
This is a list of the power conference teams (Big 10, Big 12, Pac-12, Notre Dame and SEC). Although the NCAA does not consider BYU a "Power Five" school, the ACC considers games against BYU as satisfying its "Power Five" scheduling requirement. The ACC plays in the non-conference games. All rankings are from the current AP Poll at the time of the game.

Date	Visitor	Home	Site	Significance	Score
September 1	California	North Carolina	California Memorial Stadium • Berkeley, CA		L 17–24
September 1	No. 1 Alabama	Louisville	Camping World Stadium • Orlando	Camping World Kickoff	L 14–51
September 2	No. 25 LSU	No. 8 Miami (FL)	AT&T Stadium • Arlington, TX	Advocare Classic	L 17–33
September 8	Duke	Northwestern	Ryan Field • Evanston, IL		W 21–7
September 8	No. 2 Clemson	Texas A&M	Kyle Field • College Station, TX		W 28–26
September 8	No. 13 Penn State	Pittsburgh	Heinz Field • Pittsburgh, PA	Rivalry	L 6–51
September 8	Virginia	Indiana	Memorial Stadium • Bloomington, IN		L 16–20
September 15	Duke	Baylor	McLane Stadium • Waco, TX		W 40–27
September 22	No. 23 Boston College	Purdue	Ross–Ade Stadium • West Lafayette, IN		L 13–30
September 22	No. 8 Notre Dame	Wake Forest	BB&T Field • Winston–Salem, NC		L 27–56
October 6	No. 6 Notre Dame	No. 23 Virginia Tech	Lane Stadium • Blacksburg, VA		L 23–45
October 13	Pittsburgh	No. 5 Notre Dame	Notre Dame Stadium • South Bend, IN	Rivalry	L 14–19
November 10	Florida State	No. 3 Notre Dame	Notre Dame Stadium • South Bend, IN		L 13–42
November 17	No. 12 Syracuse	No. 3 Notre Dame	Yankee Stadium • Bronx, NY		L 3–36
November 24	Georgia Tech	No. 5 Georgia	Sanford Stadium • Athens, GA	Clean, Old-Fashioned Hate	L 21–45
November 24	South Carolina	No. 2 Clemson	Memorial Stadium • Clemson, SC	Palmetto Bowl	W 56–35
November 24	No. 17 Kentucky	Louisville	Cardinal Stadium • Louisville, KY	Governor's Cup	L 10–56
November 24	No. 13 Florida	Florida State	Doak Campbell Stadium • Tallahassee, FL	Rivalry	L 14–41

=== Records against other conferences ===
Regular Season

Power 5 Conferences	Record
Big Ten	1–3
Big 12	1–0
BYU/Notre Dame	0–5
Pac-12	0–1
SEC	2–5
Power 5 Total	4–14
Other FBS Conferences	Record
American	4–3
C–USA	5–1
Independents (Excluding BYU & Notre Dame)	3–0
MAC	5–0
Mountain West	0–0
Sun Belt	1–0
Other FBS Total	18–4
FCS Opponents	Record
Football Championship Subdivision	14–0
Total Non-Conference Record	36–18

Post Season

Power Conferences 5	Record
Big Ten	0–2
Big 12	1–0
BYU/Notre Dame	1–0
Pac-12	0–1
SEC	2–1
Power 5 Total	4–4
Other FBS Conferences	Record
American	2–1
C–USA	0–0
Independents (Excluding BYU & Notre Dame)	0–0
MAC	0–0
Mountain West	0–0
Sun Belt	0–0
Other FBS Total	2–1
Total Bowl Record	6–5

== Postseason ==
=== Bowl games ===
Legend
ACC win
ACC loss

Bowl game	Date	Site	Television	Time (EST)	ACC team	Opponent	Score	Attendance
2018 Birmingham Bowl	December 22	Legion Field • Birmingham, AL	ESPN	12:00 p.m.	Wake Forest	Memphis	**W** 37–34	25,717
2018 First Responder Bowl	December 26	Cotton Bowl • Dallas, TX	ESPN	1:30 p.m.	Boston College	Boise State	Canceled	
2018 Quick Lane Bowl	December 26	Ford Field • Detroit, MI	ESPN	5:15 p.m.	Georgia Tech	Minnesota	**L** 10–34	27,228
2018 Independence Bowl	December 27	Independence Stadium • Shreveport, LA	ESPN	1:30 p.m.	Duke	Temple	**W** 56–27	27,492
2018 Pinstripe Bowl	December 27	Yankee Stadium • New York, NY	ESPN	5:15 p.m.	Miami	Wisconsin	**L** 3–35	37,821
2018 Camping World Bowl	December 28	Camping World Stadium • Orlando, FL	ESPN	5:15 p.m.	No. 20 Syracuse	No. 16 West Virginia	**W** 34–18	41,125
2018 Belk Bowl	December 29	Bank of America Stadium • Charlotte, NC	ESPN	12:00 p.m.	Virginia	South Carolina	**W** 28–0	48,263
2018 Military Bowl	December 31	Navy–Marine Corps Memorial Stadium • Annapolis, MD	ESPN	12:00 p.m.	Virginia Tech	Cincinnati	**L** 31–35	32,832
2018 Sun Bowl	December 31	Sun Bowl • El Paso, TX	CBS	2:00 p.m.	Pittsburgh	Stanford	**L** 13–14	40,680
2018 Gator Bowl	December 31	TIAA Bank Field • Jacksonville, FL	ESPN	7:30 p.m.	NC State	No. 19 Texas A&M	**L** 13–52	38,206
**College Football Playoff bowl games**
Cotton Bowl (CFP Semifinal)	December 29	AT&T Stadium • Arlington, TX	ESPN	4:00 p.m.	No. 2 Clemson	No. 3 Notre Dame	**W** 30–3	72,183
CFP National Championship	January 7	Levi's Stadium • Santa Clara, CA	ESPN	8:00 p.m.	No. 2 Clemson	No. 1 Alabama	**W** 44–16	74,814

Rankings are from CFP rankings. All times Eastern Time Zone. ACC teams shown in bold.

== Awards and honors ==
=== Player of the week honors ===
Week	Quarterback			Running Back			Offensive Line			Receiver			Defensive Line			Linebacker			Defensive Back			Specialist			Rookie		
Week	Player	Team	Position	Player	Team	Position	Player	Team	Position	Player	Team	Position	Player	Team	Position	Player	Team	Position	Player	Team	Position	Player	Team	Position	Player	Team	Position
Week 1 (Sept. 4)	Eric Dungey	Syracuse	QB	Jordan Ellis	Virginia	RB	Tremayne Anchrum; Chris Lindstrom	Clemson; Boston College	OT; OT	Jakobi Meyers	NC State	WR	Gerald Willis	Miami	DT	Rayshard Ashby	Virginia Tech	LB	Caleb Farley	Virginia Tech	CB	Maurice Ffrench	Pittsburgh	KR	Sage Surratt	Wake Forest	WR
Week 2 (Sept. 10)	Daniel Jones	Duke	QB	A. J. Dillon	Boston College	RB	Mitch Hyatt	Clemson	OT	Tee Higgins	Clemson	WR	Clelin Ferrell	Clemson	DE	Ben Humphreys	Duke	LB	Juan Thornhill	Virginia	SS	Greg Dortch	Wake Forest	KR	Thayer Thomas	NC State	WR
Week 3 (Sept. 17)	Anthony Brown	Boston College	QB	A.J. Dillon (2)	Boston College	RB	Jack Wohlabaugh	Duke	C	Olamide Zaccheaus	Virginia	HB	Wyatt Ray	Boston College	DE	Kielan Whitner	Syracuse	LB	Dylan Singleton	Duke	S	Andre Szmyt	Syracuse	PK	Tommy DeVito	Syracuse	QB
Week 4 (Sept. 24)	Eric Dungey (2)	Syracuse	QB	Travis Etienne	Clemson	RB	William Sweet	North Carolina	OT	Kelvin Harmon	NC State	WR	Alton Robinson	Syracuse	DE	Charles Snowden	Virginia	OLB	Jarius Morehead	NC State	SS	Sean Riley	Syracuse	KR/PR	Trevor Lawrence	Clemson	QB
Week 5 (Oct. 1)	Ryan Willis	Virginia Tech	QB	Travis Etienne (2)	Clemson	RB	Mitch Hyatt (2)	Clemson	OT	Greg Dortch	Wake Forest	WR	Joe Jackson	Miami	DE	DeCalon Brooks; Shaq Quarterman	Florida State; Miami	LB	Reggie Floyd	Virginia Tech	S	Andre Szmyt (2)	Syracuse	PK	Sam Hartman	Wake Forest	QB
Week 6 (Oct. 8)	TaQuon Marshall	Georgia Tech	QB	Qadree Ollison	Pittsburgh	RB	Parker Braun	Georgia Tech	LG	Kelvin Harmon (2); Damon Hazelton	NC State; Virginia Tech	WR	Alton Robinson (2)	Syracuse	DE	Germaine Pratt	NC State	LB	Damar Hamlin	Pittsburgh	FS	D.J. Matthews	Florida State	PR	Lyn-J Dixon	Clemson	RB
Week 7 (Oct. 15)	Anthony Brown (2)	Boston College	QB	Michael Carter	North Carolina	TB	Chris Lindstrom (2)	Boston College	OT	T.J. Rahming	Duke	WR	Zach Allen	Boston College	DE	Joe Giles-Harris	Duke	LB	Juan Thornhill (2)	Virginia	SS	Maurice Ffrench (2)	Pittsburgh	KR	Chris Rumph II	Duke	DE
Week 8 (Oct. 22)	Deondre Francois	Florida State	QB	Antonio Williams	North Carolina	TB	Mitch Hyatt (3)	Clemson	OT	Jamal Custis	Syracuse	WR	Brian Burns	Florida State	DE	Ryan Guthrie	Syracuse	LB	Bryce Hall	Virginia	CB	Dazz Newsome	North Carolina	PR	Trevor Lawrence (2)	Clemson	QB
Week 9 (Oct. 29)	Eric Dungey (3)	Syracuse	QB	Deon Jackson; Mat Colburn II	Duke; Wake Forest	RB	Parker Braun (2)	Georgia Tech	OG	Kelvin Harmon (3)	NC State	WR	Carlos Bashman	Wake Forest	DE	Germaine Pratt (2)	NC State	LB	Cameron Glenn	Wake Forest	FS	Alex Kessman	Pittsburgh	PK	Tobias Oliver; Trevor Lawrence (3)	Georgia Tech; Clemson	QB
Week 10 (Nov. 5)	James Blackman	Florida State	QB	Darrin Hall	Pittsburgh	RB	Mike Herndon	Pittsburgh	OG	Tamorrion Terry	Florida State	WR	Anree Saint-Amour	Georgia Tech	DE	Cole Holcomb	North Carolina	LB	Brandon Sebastian	Boston College	DB	Christopher Dunn	NC State	PK	Tobias Oliver (2)	Georgia Tech	QB
Week 11 (Nov. 12)	Daniel Jones (2)	Duke	QB	Quadree Ollison (2)	Pittsburgh	RB	Jimmy Morrissey	Pittsburgh	C	Kelvin Harmon (4)	NC State	WR	Christian Wilkins	Clemson	DT	Jalen Johnson	Georgia Tech	OLB	Cameron Glenn (2)	Wake Forest	S	Joe Reed	Virginia	KR	Trevor Lawrence (4)	Clemson	QB
Week 12 (Nov. 19)	Kenny Pickett	Pittsburgh	QB	Cam Akers	Florida State	RB	Garrett Bradbury	NC State	C	Tamorrion Terry (2)	Florida State	WR	Zach Allen (2)	Boston College	DE	Dontavious Jackson	Florida State	LB	Stanford Samuels III	Florida State	CB	Wesley Wells	Georgia Tech	PK	Tamorrion Terry	Florida State	WR
Week 13 (Nov. 26)	Eric Dungey (4)	Syracuse	QB	Reggie Gallaspy; Cade Carney	NC State; Wake Forest	RB	Justin Falcinelli	Clemson	C	Tee Higgins (2)	Clemson	WR	Ricky Walker	Virginia Tech	DT	Ryan Guthrie (2)	Syracuse	LB	Andre Cisco	Syracuse	S	Juanyeh Thomas	Georgia Tech	KR	Trevor Lawrence (5)	Clemson	QB

=== All-Conference teams ===
First Team

Position	Player	Class	Team
First Team Offense
QB	Ryan Finley	Gr.	NC State
RB	Travis Etienne	So.	Clemson
RB	A. J. Dillon	So.	Boston College
WR	Kelvin Harmon	Jr.	NC State
WR	Olamide Zaccheaus	Sr.	Virginia
WR	Jakobi Meyers	Jr.	NC State
TE	Tommy Sweeney	Gr.	Boston College
T	Mitch Hyatt	Sr.	Clemson
T	Tyler Jones	Sr.	NC State
G	Chris Lindstrom	Sr.	Boston College
G	Parker Braun	Jr.	Georgia Tech
C	Garrett Bradbury	Gr.	NC State
All Purpose Back	Greg Dortch	So.	Wake Forest
First Team Defense
DE	Clelin Ferrell	Jr.	Clemson
DE	Brian Burns	Jr.	Florida State
DT	Christian Wilkins	Gr.	Clemson
DT	Dexter Lawrence	Jr.	Clemson
LB	Germaine Pratt	Gr.	NC State
LB	Shaquille Quarterman	Jr.	Miami
LB	Joe Giles-Harris	Jr.	Duke
CB	Hamp Cheevers	Jr.	Boston College
CB	Bryce Hall	Jr.	Virginia
S	Juan Thornhill	Sr.	Virginia
S	Andre Cisco	Fr.	Syracuse
First Team Special Teams
PK	Andre Szmyt	R-Fr.	Syracuse
P	Sterling Hofrichter	Jr.	Syracuse
SP	Greg Dortch	So.	Wake Forest

Second Team

Position	Player	Class	Team
Second Team Offense
QB	Trevor Lawrence	Fr.	Clemson
RB	Qadree Ollison	Sr.	Pittsburgh
RB	Travis Homer	Jr.	Miami
WR	Tee Higgins	So.	Clemson
WR	Jamal Custis	Sr.	Syracuse
WR	Damon Hazelton	So.	Virginia Tech
TE	Brevin Jordan	Fr.	Miami
T	Tremayne Anchrum	Jr.	Clemson
T	Stefano Millin	Sr.	Pittsburgh
G	Phil Haynes	Sr.	Wake Forest
G	Sean Pollard	Jr.	Clemson
C	Justin Falcinelli	Gr.	Clemson
All Purpose Back	Deon Jackson	So.	Duke
Second Team Defense
DE	Zach Allen	Sr.	Boston College
DE	Alton Robinson	Jr.	Syracuse
DT	Gerald Willis	Sr.	Miami
DT	Ricky Walker	Sr.	Virginia Tech
LB	Cole Holcomb	Sr.	North Carolina
LB	Tre Lamar	Jr.	Clemson
LB	Ryan Guthrie	Sr.	Syracuse
CB	Trayvon Mullen	Jr.	Clemson
CB	Essang Bassey	Jr.	Wake Forest
S	Jaquan Johnson	Sr.	Miami
S	Cameron Glenn	Sr.	Wake Forest
Second Team Special Teams
PK	Christopher Dunn	Fr.	NC State
P	Pressley Harvin III	So.	Georgia Tech
SP	Michael Walker	Sr.	Boston College

Third Team

Position	Player	Class	Team
Third Team Offense
QB	Eric Dungey	Sr.	Syracuse
RB	Darrin Hall	Sr.	Pittsburgh
RB	Reggie Gallaspy Jr.	Sr.	NC State
WR	T.J. Rahming	Sr.	Duke
WR	Hunter Renfrow	Gr.	Clemson
WR	Nyqwan Murray	Sr.	Florida State
TE	Daniel Helm	Sr.	Duke
T	Aaron Monteiro	Sr.	Boston College
T	Koda Martin	Gr.	Syracuse
G	John Simpson	Jr.	Clemson
G	Mike Herndon	Sr.	Pittsburgh
C	Jimmy Morrissey	So.	Pittsburgh
All Purpose Back	Sean Riley	Jr.	Syracuse
Third Team Defense
DE	Austin Bryant	Sr.	Clemson
DE	Wyatt Ray	Sr.	Boston College
DT	Demarcus Christmas	Sr.	Florida State
DT	Ray Smith	Sr.	Boston College
LB	Kendall Joseph	Gr.	Clemson
LB	Chris Peace	Sr.	Virginia
LB	Connor Strachan	Gr.	Boston College
CB	Trajan Bandy	So.	Miami
CB	A. J. Terrell	So.	Clemson
S	Tanner Muse	Jr.	Clemson
S	Will Harris	Sr.	Boston College
Third Team Special Teams
PK	Alex Kessman	So.	Pittsburgh
P	Oscar Bradburn	So.	Virginia Tech
SP	Joe Reed	Jr.	Virginia

=== ACC Individual Awards ===
ACC Player of the Year

Travis Etienne

ACC Rookie of the Year

Trevor Lawrence

ACC Coach of the Year

Dabo Swinney

ACC Offensive Player of the Year

Travis Etienne

ACC Offensive Rookie of the Year

Trevor Lawrence

Jacobs Blocking Trophy

Mitch Hyatt

ACC Defensive Player of the Year

Clelin Ferrell

ACC Defensive Rookie of the Year

Andre Cisco

==== All-Americans ====
===== Consensus =====
2018 Consensus All-Americans
First Team	Second Team
Mitch Hyatt – Clemson; Garrett Bradbury – NC State; Andre Szmyt – Syracuse; Christian Wilkins – Clemson	Travis Etienne – Clemson

===== Associated Press =====
2018 AP All-Americans
First Team	Second Team	Third Team
Mitch Hyatt – Clemson; Garrett Bradbury – NC State; Andre Szmyt – Syracuse; Christian Wilkins – Clemson; Clelin Ferrell – Clemson	Travis Etienne – Clemson; Greg Dortch – Wake Forest; Gerald Willis – Miami	Terrone Prescod – NC State; Chris Lindstrom – Boston College; Hamp Cheevers – Boston College; Andre Cisco – Syracuse

===== Walter Camp =====
2018 Walter Camp All-Americans
First Team	Second Team	Third Team
Mitch Hyatt – Clemson; Garrett Bradbury – NC State; Andre Szmyt – Syracuse; Christian Wilkins – Clemson; Clelin Ferrell – Clemson	Travis Etienne – Clemson; Hamp Cheevers – Boston College; Andre Cisco – Syracuse; Bryce Hall – Virginia; Michael Walker – Boston College	None

===== FWAA =====
2018 FWAA All-Americans
First Team	Second Team
Mitch Hyatt – Clemson; Garrett Bradbury – NC State; Christian Wilkins – Clemson; Hamp Cheevers – Boston College; Andre Szmyt – Syracuse; Greg Dortch – Wake Forest	Travis Etienne – Clemson; Gerald Willis – Miami; Bryce Hall – Virginia; Michael Walker – Boston College

=== National award winners ===
- Hunter Renfrow – Burlsworth Trophy
- Christian Wilkins – Campbell Trophy
- Garrett Bradbury – Rimington Trophy
- Clelin Ferrell – Ted Hendricks Award
- Andre Szmyt – Lou Groza Award
- Dabo Swinney – Woody Hayes Award, Bear Bryant Award
- Trevor Lawrence – Archie Griffin Award

== Home game attendance ==
Team	Stadium	Capacity	Game 1	Game 2	Game 3	Game 4	Game 5	Game 6	Game 7	Total	Average	% of Capacity
Boston College	Alumni Stadium	44,500	30,112	40,311	40,111	31,478	**44,514**†	44,500	34,959	265,985	37,998	83.39%
Clemson	Memorial Stadium	81,500	80,048	79,844	80,122	81,295	78,741	81,313	81,436†	562,799	80,400	98.65%
Duke	Wallace Wade Stadium	40,000	26,017	30,477	32,177	20,277	35,493†	20,782		165,223	27,537	68.84%
Florida State	Doak Campbell Stadium	79,560	75,237†	72,239	65,633	67,274	68,403	57,274	71,953	478,013	68,288	85.83%
Georgia Tech	Bobby Dodd Stadium	55,000	39,719	50,595†	40,740	41,709	48,217	37,543		258,523	43,087	78.34%
Louisville	Cardinal Stadium	60,800	44,520	54,923†	52,798	51,658	49,603	48,265	49,988	351,755	50,251	82.65%
Miami	Hard Rock Stadium	65,326	60,307	59,814	60,845	**65,490**†	62,326	59,606		368,388	61,398	93.99%
North Carolina	Kenan Memorial Stadium	50,500	44,168	50,500†	40,782	41,151	41,510			218,111	43,622	86.38%
NC State	Carter–Finley Stadium	57,583	56,073	56,017	**57,600**†	57,241	**57,600**†	56,228	57,223	397,982	56,855	98.73%
Pittsburgh	Heinz Field	68,400	34,486	68,400†	34,284	37,100	31,510	44,398		250,178	41,696	60.96%
Syracuse	Carrier Dome	49,262	29,395	37,457	36,632	35,210	40,769	42,797†		222,260	37,043	75.20%
Virginia	Scott Stadium	61,500	40,524	34,446	42,393	43,128†	36,256	41,485		238,222	39,704	64.56%
Virginia Tech	Lane Stadium	66,233	65,632	65,632	65,632	65,632	62,379	60,776	31,336	417,019	59,574	89.95%
Wake Forest	BB&T Field	31,500	23,619	25,309	31,092	24,519	**31,608**†	26,136	25,609	187,892	26,842	85.21%

Bold – Exceeded capacity
†Season High

== NFL draft ==
Round #	Pick #	NFL team	Player	Position	College
1	4	Oakland Raiders	Clelin Ferrell	DE	Clemson
1	6	New York Giants	Daniel Jones	QB	Duke
1	13	Miami Dolphins	Christian Wilkins	DT	Clemson
1	14	Atlanta Falcons	Chris Lindstrom	G	Boston College
1	16	Carolina Panthers	Brian Burns	LB	Florida State
1	17	New York Giants	Dexter Lawrence	DT	Clemson
1	18	Minnesota Vikings	Garrett Bradbury	C	NC State
2	40	Oakland Raiders	Trayvon Mullen	CB	Clemson
2	63	Kansas City Chiefs	Juan Thornhill	S	Virginia
3	65	Arizona Cardinals	Zach Allen	DE	Boston College
3	72	Cincinnati Bengals	Germaine Pratt	LB	NC State
3	81	Detroit Lions	Will Harris	S	Boston College
4	104	Cincinnati Bengals	Ryan Finley	QB	NC State
4	117	Detroit Lions	Austin Bryant	DE	Clemson
4	119	Cleveland Browns	Sheldrick Redwine	S	Miami
4	124	Seattle Seahawks	Phil Haynes	G	Wake Forest
5	149	Oakland Raiders	Hunter Renfrow	WR	Clemson
5	152	Atlanta Falcons	Qadree Ollison	RB	Pittsburgh
5	158	Dallas Cowboys	Michael Jackson	CB	Miami
5	165	Dallas Cowboys	Joe Jackson	DE	Miami
5	173	Washington Redskins	Cole Holcomb	LB	North Carolina
6	181	Buffalo Bills	Jaquan Johnson	CB	Miami
6	198	San Francisco 49ers	Tim Harris	CB	Virginia
6	204	Seattle Seahawks	Travis Homer	RB	Miami
6	206	Washington Redskins	Kelvin Harmon	WR	NC State
6	209	Seattle Seahawks	Demarcus Christmas	DT	Florida State
7	228	Buffalo Bills	Tommy Sweeney	TE	Boston College
7	245	New York Giants	Chris Slayton	DT	Syracuse
