= Garrett Bradbury =

American football player (born 1995)

No. 67 – Chicago Bears
- Position: Center
- Roster status: Active

Personal information
- Born: June 20, 1995 (age 31); Charlotte, North Carolina, U.S.
- Listed height: 6 ft 3 in (1.91 m)
- Listed weight: 305 lb (138 kg)

Career information
- High school: Charlotte Christian
- College: NC State (2014–2018)
- NFL draft: 2019: 1st round, 18th overall pick

Career history
- Minnesota Vikings (2019–2024); New England Patriots (2025); Chicago Bears (2026–present)

Awards and highlights
- Rimington Trophy (2018); Consensus All-American (2018); First-team All-ACC (2018)

Career NFL statistics as of Week 5, 2026
- Games played: 110
- Games started: 110
- Stats at Pro Football Reference

Garrett Bradbury (born June 20, 1995) is an American professional football center for the Chicago Bears of the National Football League (NFL). He played college football for the NC State Wolfpack and was selected by the Minnesota Vikings in the first round of the 2019 NFL draft.

== Early life ==
Bradbury attended Charlotte Christian School in Charlotte, North Carolina, where played high school football as a tight end and defensive lineman.

== College career ==
Bradbury was originally a tight end at NC State before moving to the offensive line in 2015. As a senior in 2018, he was a consensus All-American and won the Rimington Trophy. He did not allow a single quarterback sack in over 900 snaps in 2018.

== Professional career ==
Pre-draft measurables
Height	Weight	Arm length	Hand span	Wingspan	40-yard dash	10-yard split	20-yard split	20-yard shuttle	Three-cone drill	Vertical jump	Broad jump	Bench press
6 ft 2 7/8 in (1.90 m)	306 lb (139 kg)	31 3/4 in (0.81 m)	10 1/2 in (0.27 m)	6 ft 4 1/2 in (1.94 m)	4.92 s	1.70 s	2.84 s	4.53 s	7.41 s	31.0 in (0.79 m)	8 ft 8 in (2.64 m)	34 reps
All values from NFL Combine

=== Minnesota Vikings ===
Bradbury was drafted by the Minnesota Vikings in the first round with the 18th overall pick in the 2019 NFL draft. As a rookie, he started all 16 regular season games and both of the Vikings' playoff games in the 2019 season. In 2020, Bradbury started all 16 games. In the 2021 season, he started in all 13 games he appeared in.

On January 2, 2022, Bradbury was part of a play that re-enacted former Pittsburgh Steelers running back Franco Harris' Immaculate Reception. Quarterback Sean Mannion attempted a pass to tight end Tyler Conklin, who was hit by two Green Bay Packers defenders. The hit on Conklin caused the ball to be deflected into the air, where Bradbury caught it and turned the play into a 21-yard reception.

The Vikings declined the fifth-year option on Bradbury's contract on May 2, 2022, making him a free agent after the season. In the 2022 season, he appeared in and started 12 games.

On March 14, 2023, Bradbury signed a three-year, $15.7 million contract extension with the Vikings. In the 2023 season, he appeared in and started 14 games. In the 2024 season, he started in all 17 games and played every offensive snap of the season.

On March 17, 2025, Bradbury was released by the Vikings after spending six seasons with the team.

=== New England Patriots ===
On March 18, 2025, Bradbury signed a two-year deal worth up to $12 million with the New England Patriots. He started all 21 games the Patriots played in the 2025 season, including in Super Bowl LX, a 29–13 loss to the Seattle Seahawks.

=== Chicago Bears ===
On March 11, 2026, the Patriots traded Bradbury to the Chicago Bears in exchange for a 2027 fifth-round draft pick. The Bears had been seeking a replacement at center following Drew Dalman's retirement. He beat out rookie Logan Jones for the starting role, playing alongside his former NC State teammate and left guard Joe Thuney.

== NFL career statistics ==
Legend
**Bold**	Career high

=== Regular season ===
Year	Team	Games		Tackles			Fumbles			
Year	Team	GP	GS	Cmb	Solo	Ast	Fum	FR	Yds	TD
2019	MIN	16	16	0	0	0	0	1	**0**	0
2020	MIN	16	16	0	0	0	1	**2**	-12	0
2021	MIN	13	13	**1**	0	**1**	0	0	–	–
2022	MIN	12	12	**1**	**1**	0	0	0	–	–
2023	MIN	14	14	0	0	0	0	1	**0**	0
2024	MIN	17	17	0	0	0	0	0	–	–
2025	NE	17	17	0	0	0	**2**	0	-27	0
2026	CHI	5	5	0	0	0	0	0	0	0
Career		110	110	2	1	1	3	4	-39	0

=== Postseason ===
Year	Team	Games		Tackles			Fumbles			
Year	Team	GP	GS	Cmb	Solo	Ast	Fum	FR	Yds	TD
2019	MIN	2	2	0	0	0	0	0	0	0
2022	MIN	1	1	0	0	0	0	0	0	0
2024	MIN	1	1	0	0	0	0	0	0	0
2025	NE	4	4	0	0	0	0	0	0	0
Career		0	0	0	0	0	0	0	0	0
