= Sean Riley (wide receiver, born 1997) =

American football player (born 1997)

No. 14
- Positions: Wide receiver, return specialist

Personal information
- Born: October 31, 1997 (age 29)
- Listed height: 5 ft 8 in (1.73 m)
- Listed weight: 178 lb (81 kg)

Career information
- High school: Narbonne (Los Angeles)
- College: Syracuse (2016–2019)
- NFL draft: 2020: undrafted

Career history
- New England Patriots (2020)*; Calgary Stampeders (2021)
- * Offseason or practice squad member only

Awards and highlights
- FBS kick return yards leader (2016); Third-team All-ACC (2018)
- Stats at CFL.ca

Sean K. Riley Jr. (born October 31, 1997) is an American former football wide receiver. He played college football at Syracuse University, and professionally for the Calgary Stampeders of the Canadian Football League (CFL).

== Early life ==
Sean K. Riley Jr. was born on October 31, 1997. He played high school football at Narbonne High School in Los Angeles as a running back. He recorded career totals of 4,476 all-purpose yards and 39 total touchdowns.

== College career ==
Riley was a four-year letterman for the Syracuse Orange of Syracuse University from 2016 to 2019. As a true freshman in 2016, he led the country in both kick returns with 53 and kick return yards with 1,095. His 1,125 total return yards was also second to consensus All-American Quadree Henderson (1,166 yards). Riley led the Atlantic Coast Conference (ACC) with 16.4 yards per punt return in 2018, earning third-team All-ACC honors. He played in all 49 games for Syracuse from 2019 to 2019, recording college career totals of 119 receptions for 1,265 yards and four touchdowns, 15 rushes for 97 yards, 115 kick returns for 2,433 yards, and 50 punt returns for 563 yards and one touchdown.

== Professional career ==
After going undrafted in the 2020 NFL draft, Riley signed with the New England Patriots on May 5, 2020. He was later released on July 26, 2020.

Riley was signed to the practice roster of the Calgary Stampeders of the Canadian Football League on January 25, 2021. He played in the season opener against the Toronto Argonauts on August 7, returning three kickoffs for 61 yards and four punts for 39 yards. He was moved to the practice roster on August 11 and later released on August 15, 2021.

== Personal life ==
Riley has also spent time as a disc jockey.
