= Mitch Hyatt =

American football player (born 1997)

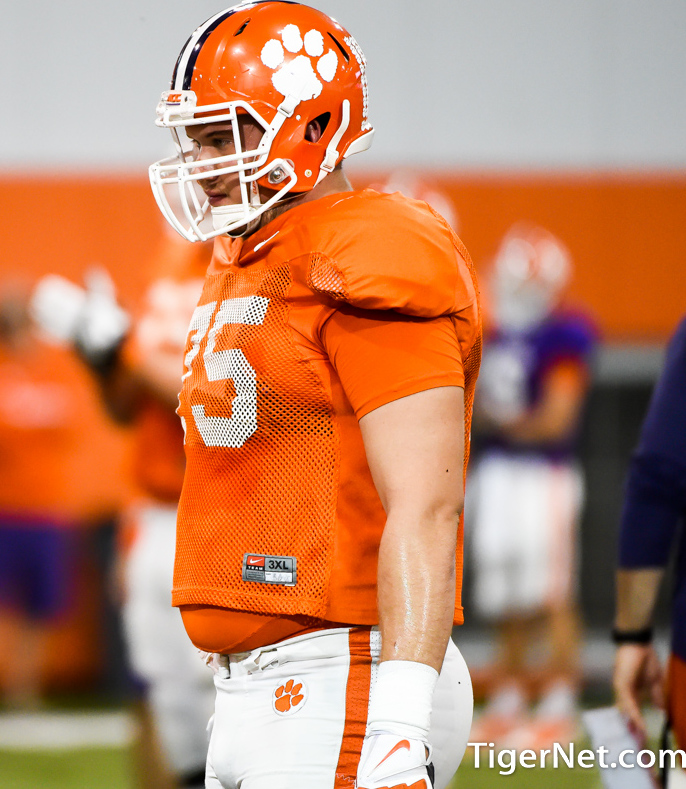
- Hyatt with the Clemson Tigers in 2017

Profile
- Position: Offensive tackle

Personal information
- Born: February 6, 1997 (age 29); Sugar Hill, Georgia, U.S.
- Listed height: 6 ft 5 in (1.96 m)
- Listed weight: 306 lb (139 kg)

Career information
- High school: North Gwinnett (Suwanee, Georgia)
- College: Clemson
- NFL draft: 2019: undrafted

Career history
- Dallas Cowboys (2019–2021)

Awards and highlights
- 2× CFP national champion (2016, 2018); Jacobs Blocking Award (2017, 2018); Consensus All-American (2018); 3× First team All-ACC (2016, 2017, 2018)
- Stats at Pro Football Reference

Mitch Hyatt (born February 6, 1997) is an American former professional football player who was an offensive tackle for the Dallas Cowboys of the National Football League (NFL). He played college football for the Clemson Tigers, earning consensus All-American honors in 2018.

== Early life ==
A native of Sugar Hill, Georgia, Hyatt attended North Gwinnett High School, where he was three-year starter at left tackle for the Bulldogs, and an All-American offensive lineman as a senior.

In Hyatt's sophomore year, North Gwinnett faced defending state champion Grayson in the second round of the GHSA Class 6A playoffs, upsetting them 28–10, as Hyatt reportedly played Grayson's blue chip defensive end Robert Nkemdiche “to a draw.”

After an All-State junior season, in which he helped pave the way for North’s run to a GHSA Class 6A state runner-up finish, Hyatt verbally committed to Clemson.

== College career ==
Listed first team on the depth chart entering August camp in 2015, Hyatt was scheduled to become the first freshman since Barry Richardson in 2004 to start on the offensive line for Clemson. He started the season opener against Wofford at left tackle, the first true-freshman to do so for the Tigers since Phil Prince in 1944.

Hyatt was part of the Clemson team that defeated Alabama in the 2017 College Football Playoff National Championship by a score of 35–31. In 2017, Hyatt was named as the recipient of the Jacobs Blocking Trophy for the ACC's most outstanding blocker. Hyatt was the 8th Clemson lineman to receive this award, and the first since 1987.

As a senior in 2018, Hyatt became the 13th repeat winner of the Jacobs Blocking Trophy. He also became the Tigers' all time leader in snaps from scrimmage during the 2018 Louisville game.

He finished with school records in career starts (57) and snaps played (3,754). He was a three-time first-team All-ACC selection and twice received the Jacobs Blocking Trophy as the ACC Conference top offensive lineman.

== Professional career ==
Pre-draft measurables
Height	Weight	Arm length	Hand span	20-yard shuttle	Three-cone drill	Vertical jump	Broad jump	Bench press
6 ft 5 in (1.96 m)	303 lb (137 kg)	34 1/8 in (0.87 m)	10 1/4 in (0.26 m)	4.52 s	7.72 s	25.5 in (0.65 m)	102 ft 0 in (31.09 m)	28 reps
All values from 2019 NFL Combine

Hyatt was signed as an undrafted free agent by the Dallas Cowboys after the 2019 NFL draft on April 30. He struggled during preseason as a backup left tackle and was released on August 31. He was signed to the practice squad on September 2. He was promoted to the active roster on December 10, 2019. He was declared inactive for the last 3 games.

On August 27, 2020, he suffered a torn right ACL during practice. On September 2, he was waived/injured by the Cowboys. He subsequently reverted to the team's injured reserve list the next day.

In 2021, he suffered a knee sprain during conditioning work in OTAs. On July 27, 2021, Hyatt was placed on injured reserve with a knee injury. After suffering from multiple knee injuries Hyatt decided to retire.

== Personal life ==
His uncle, Dan Benish, was an All-ACC defensive tackle and a starter on Clemson’s 1981 National Championship team.
