= Wyatt Ray =

American football player (born 1996)

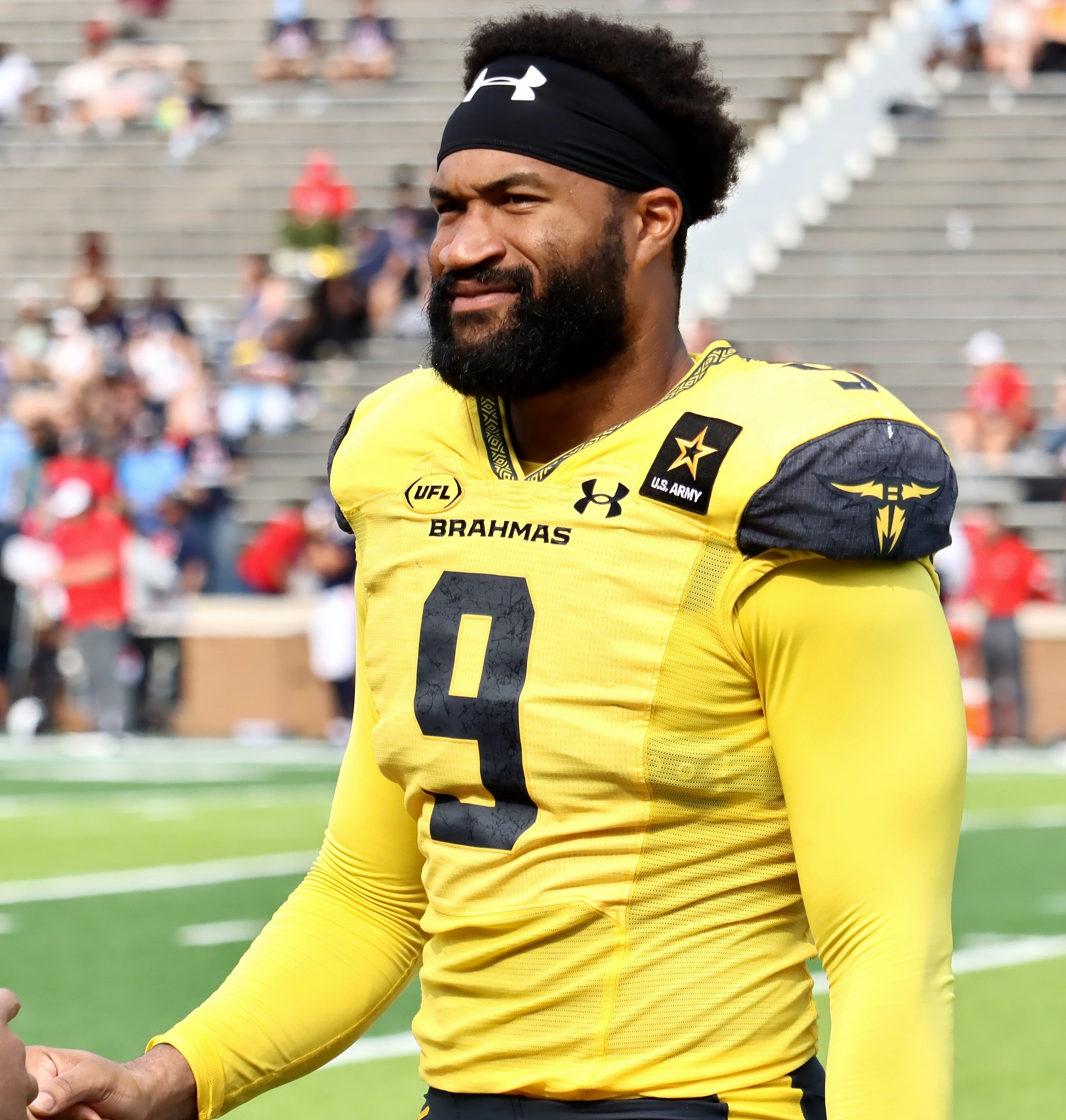
- Ray with the San Antonio Brahmas in 2024

Profile
- Position: Linebacker

Personal information
- Born: October 24, 1996 (age 30); Boca Raton, Florida, U.S.
- Listed height: 6 ft 3 in (1.91 m)
- Listed weight: 250 lb (113 kg)

Career information
- High school: St. Thomas Aquinas (Fort Lauderdale, Florida)
- College: Boston College (2015–2018)
- NFL draft: 2019: undrafted

Career history
- Cleveland Browns (2019)*; Houston Texans (2019)*; Buffalo Bills (2019)*; New York Jets (2019–2020)*; Tennessee Titans (2020); Cincinnati Bengals (2021); Jacksonville Jaguars (2022)*; Tennessee Titans (2022); Denver Broncos (2022–2023)*; San Antonio Brahmas (2024); Miami Dolphins (2024)*
- * Offseason or practice squad member only

Career NFL statistics
- Total tackles: 20
- Sacks: 2
- Forced fumbles: 1
- Stats at Pro Football Reference

Wyatt Cole Ray (born October 24, 1996) is an American professional football linebacker. He was signed by the Cleveland Browns as an undrafted free agent in 2019 following his college football career with Boston College.

== Professional career ==
Pre-draft measurables
Height	Weight	Arm length	Hand span	40-yard dash	10-yard split	20-yard split	20-yard shuttle	Three-cone drill	Vertical jump	Broad jump	Bench press
6 ft 3 1/4 in (1.91 m)	257 lb (117 kg)	32 1/2 in (0.83 m)	9 3/8 in (0.24 m)	4.83 s	1.74 s	2.82 s	4.31 s	7.34 s	34.0 in (0.86 m)	9 ft 10 in (3.00 m)	25 reps
All values from NFL Combine

=== Cleveland Browns ===
Ray signed with the Cleveland Browns as an undrafted free agent following the 2019 NFL draft on May 3, 2019. He was waived during final roster cuts on August 31, 2019.

=== Houston Texans ===
Ray was signed to the practice squad of the Houston Texans on September 2, 2019. He was released on October 3, 2019.

=== Buffalo Bills ===
Ray signed to the Buffalo Bills' practice squad on October 8, 2019. He was released on November 6, 2019.

=== New York Jets ===
Ray signed to the New York Jets' practice squad on November 25, 2019. He signed a reserve/futures contract with the team after the season on December 30, 2019. He was waived on August 3, 2020.

=== Tennessee Titans (first stint) ===
Ray signed with the Tennessee Titans on August 13, 2020. He was waived during final roster cuts on September 5, 2020, and signed to the team's practice squad two days later. He was elevated to the active roster on November 7, December 12, and December 19 for the team's weeks 9, 14, and 15 games against the Chicago Bears, Jacksonville Jaguars, and Detroit Lions, and reverted to the practice squad after each game. He was signed to the active roster on December 24, 2020. In Week 16 against the Green Bay Packers on Sunday Night Football, Ray recorded his first career sack on Aaron Rodgers during the 40–14 loss. Ray finished the 2020 season with one tackle and one sack.

He was released as a part of the final roster cuts on August 31, 2021.

=== Cincinnati Bengals ===
On September 1, 2021, Ray was claimed off waivers by the Cincinnati Bengals.

=== Jacksonville Jaguars ===
Ray signed with the Jaguars on June 14, 2022. He was waived on August 22.

=== Tennessee Titans (second stint) ===
On September 22, 2022, Ray was signed to the Titans practice squad. He was promoted to the active roster two days later. He was waived on October 4 and re-signed to the practice squad. On December 6, the Titans released Ray.

=== Denver Broncos ===
On December 14, 2022, Ray was signed to the Denver Broncos' practice squad. He signed a reserve/future contract on January 9, 2023. On March 20, 2023, Ray was released by the Broncos.

=== Houston Roughnecks ===
On October 20, 2023, Ray was signed by the Houston Roughnecks of the XFL. The Roughnecks folded after the merging of the XFL and the USFL into the UFL.

=== San Antonio Brahmas ===
On January 5, 2024, Ray was drafted by the San Antonio Brahmas during the 2024 UFL dispersal draft. His contract was terminated on August 12, 2024, to sign with an NFL team.

=== Miami Dolphins ===
On August 12, 2024, Ray signed with the Miami Dolphins. He was placed on injured reserve on August 27. He was waived on September 4.

== Personal ==
Ray is the grandson of singer Nat King Cole and nephew of singer Natalie Cole.
