= Cooper Bateman =

American football quarterback

No. 18
- Position: Quarterback

Personal information
- Born: January 1995 (age 31); Murray, Utah
- Listed height: 6 ft 3 in (1.91 m)
- Listed weight: 217 lb (98 kg)

Career information
- High school: Cottonwood (Murray, Utah)
- College: Alabama (2013–2016); Utah (2017)

Awards and highlights
- CFP national champion (2015)
- Stats at ESPN

Cooper Bateman is an American former college football quarterback. He played for the Alabama Crimson Tide and Utah Utes.

== Early life ==
Bateman attended Cottonwood High School in Murray, Utah. As a junior, he passed for 2,484 yards and 25 touchdowns. During his senior season, Bateman passed for 2,384 yards and 15 touchdowns while rushing for 277 yards and 12 touchdowns. He was selected to participate in the Under Armour All-America Game and was named an Elite 11 finalist. A four-star recruit, Bateman committed to play college football at the University of Alabama.

== College career ==
Bateman redshirted during his first season on campus in 2013. Ahead of the 2014 season, he competed with Blake Sims and Jake Coker for the Crimson Tide's starting quarterback position; Sims ultimately won the job. Bateman did not appear at quarterback during the season but worked with the scout team and served as the team's holder. He competed with Coker for the starting quarterback position ahead of the 2015 season, but Coker was named the starter. Bateman made his first appearance at quarterback in the season opener against No. 20 Wisconsin, completing seven of eight passes for 51 yards. After the first two games of the season, he was named the Crimson Tide's starting quarterback for their game against Ole Miss. In his first career start, Bateman completed 11 passes for 87 yards and an interception before being benched in a 43–37 loss. Bateman continued to serve as Alabama's holder and finished the season with 292 passing yards, one touchdown, and two interceptions. Alabama went on to win the 2016 College Football Playoff National Championship. Entering the 2016 season, Bateman competed for the starting quarterback position for the third consecutive year but finished behind Blake Barnett and Jalen Hurts on the depth chart. After recording 119 passing yards and one touchdown during the 2016 season, Bateman announced his intention to transfer. Following their departures from Alabama, Bateman and Barnett publicly criticized head coach Nick Saban's handling of the quarterback competition.

In January 2017, Bateman transferred to the University of Utah to play for the Utah Utes. He entered his final season as the third-string quarterback behind Troy Williams and Tyler Huntley. Bateman did not appear in any games during the 2017 season.

=== Statistics ===
College statistics
Season	Team	Games			Passing								Rushing			
Season	Team	GP	GS	Record	Cmp	Att	Pct	Yds	Avg	TD	Int	Rtg	Att	Yds	Avg	TD
2013	Alabama	Redshirted (redshirt)														
2014	Alabama	14	0	—	No stats recorded											
2015	Alabama	15	1	0–1	37	52	71.2	291	5.6	1	2	116.8	5	8	1.6	0
2016	Alabama	15	0	–	12	14	85.7	119	8.5	1	0	180.7	3	-11	-3.7	0
2017	Utah	Did not play														
Career		44	1	0−1	49	66	74.2	410	6.2	2	2	130.4	8	-3	-0.4	0
