= Calvin Ridley =

American football player (born 1994)

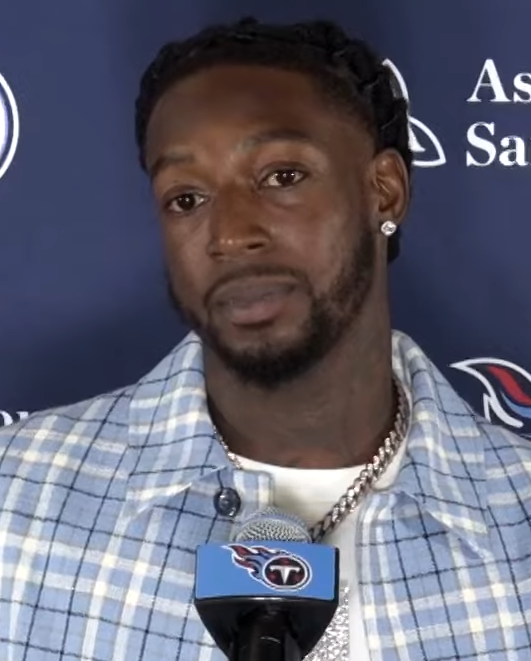
- Ridley with the Tennessee Titans in 2024

No. 0 – Tennessee Titans
- Position: Wide receiver
- Roster status: Active

Personal information
- Born: December 20, 1994 (age 31); Fort Lauderdale, Florida, U.S.
- Listed height: 6 ft 1 in (1.85 m)
- Listed weight: 190 lb (86 kg)

Career information
- High school: Monarch (Coconut Creek, Florida)
- College: Alabama (2015–2017)
- NFL draft: 2018: 1st round, 26th overall pick

Career history
- Atlanta Falcons (2018–2022); Jacksonville Jaguars (2022–2023); Tennessee Titans (2024–present)

Awards and highlights
- Second-team All-Pro (2020); PFWA All-Rookie Team (2018); 2× CFP national champion (2015, 2017); Freshman All-American (2015); First-team All-SEC (2017); 2× Second-team All-SEC (2015, 2016)

Career NFL statistics as of Week 10, 2026
- Receptions: 411
- Receiving yards: 5,769
- Receiving touchdowns: 40
- Stats at Pro Football Reference

Calvin Orin Ridley (born December 20, 1994) is an American professional football wide receiver for the Tennessee Titans of the National Football League (NFL). He played college football for the Alabama Crimson Tide, where he was a part of the national championship-winning teams in 2015 and 2017. Drafted by the Atlanta Falcons in the first round of the 2018 NFL draft, he was named to the PFWA All-Rookie Team and earned second-team All-Pro honors in 2020.

After announcing midway through the 2021 season that he would be stepping away from football due to mental health reasons, it was later revealed that Ridley would be suspended indefinitely through at least the conclusion of the 2022 season for violating the league's gambling policy. While suspended, he was traded from the Atlanta Falcons to the Jacksonville Jaguars and was reinstated the following year.

== Early life ==
Calvin Orin Ridley was born to Colin Ridley and Kay Daniels in Fort Lauderdale, Florida, on December 20, 1994. He is the eldest of 4 brothers. His younger brother, Riley Ridley, played college football for Georgia and was selected in the 4th round of the 2019 NFL draft. In 2002, Ridley and his younger brothers were taken to a foster home after their father was deported back to Guyana and their mother was imprisoned.

When he was younger, Ridley played Pop Warner football in the same league as Baltimore Ravens quarterback Lamar Jackson, Kansas City Chiefs wide receiver Marquise Brown and cornerback Trayvon Mullen, in the Pompano Beach area of Florida just four miles from the high school he would attend. Ridley attended Monarch High School in Coconut Creek, Florida, where he played high school football for the Knights. He played only three games in his senior year due to Florida age restriction rules, which doesn't allow anyone over the age of 19 and nine months to be eligible.

Ridley was rated as a five-star recruit and was considered the best receiver in the class of 2015 according to 247Sports, Rivals, and ESPN. He committed to the University of Alabama to play college football on April 19, 2014. He began enrollment at Alabama on June 19, 2015.

== College career ==
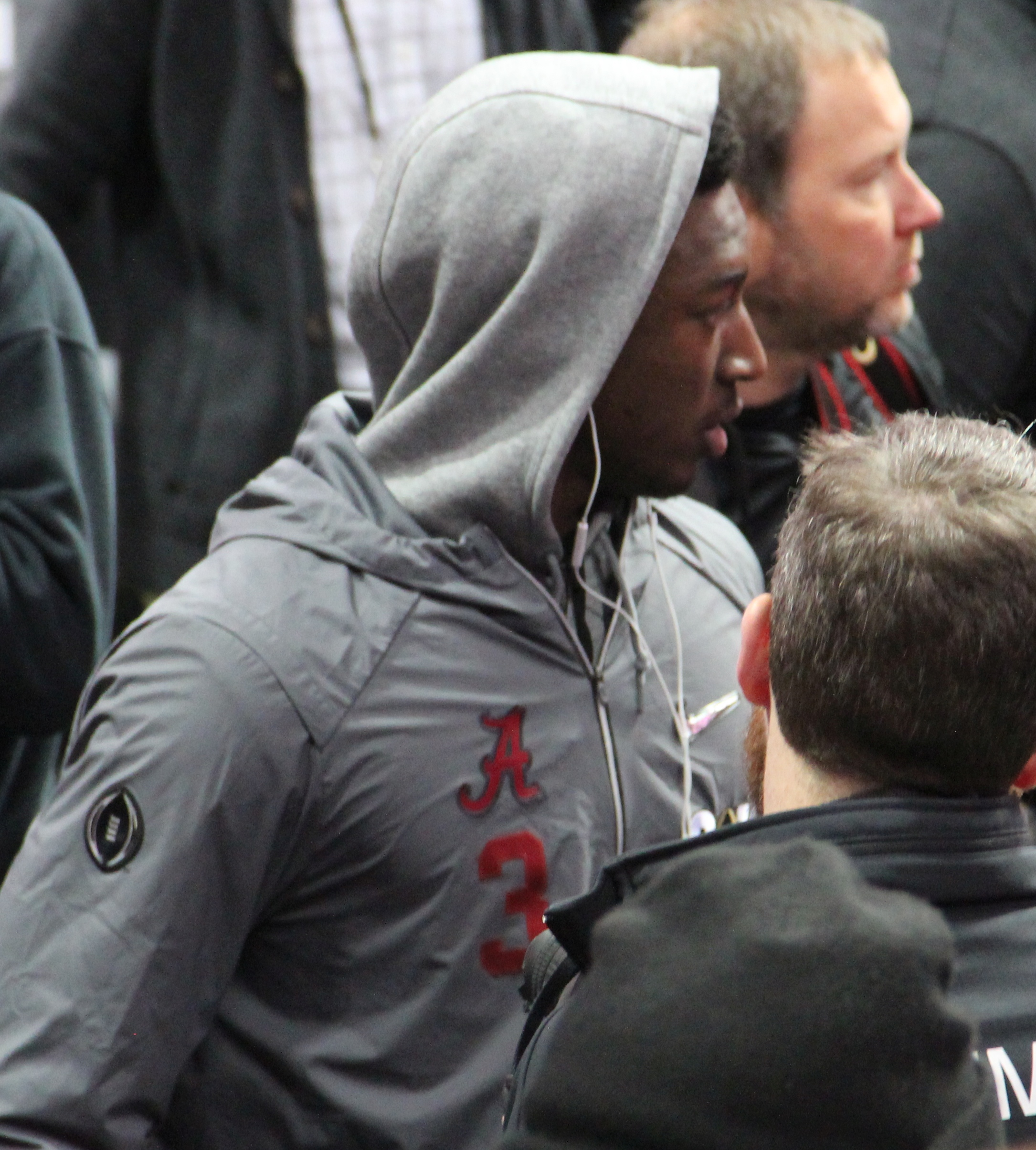
Ridley in January 2018

Ridley attended and played college football at the University of Alabama under Nick Saban from 2015 to 2017.

Ridley earned immediate playing time as a true freshman in 2015. In his first career game on September 5, 2015, he had three receptions for 22 yards against the University of Wisconsin. He scored his first collegiate touchdown in a victory over Louisiana-Monroe on September 26. In the following game, against Georgia, he had five receptions for 120 yards and a touchdown in the victory. He followed that up with 140 receiving yards and a touchdown in a victory over Arkansas. In the SEC Championship against Florida, he had eight receptions for 102 yards in the victory. The Alabama Crimson Tide made the College Football Playoff. In the 38–0 victory over Michigan State in the Cotton Bowl, he had 138 receiving yards and two touchdowns. In the National Championship against Clemson, he was held to six receptions for 14 yards but the Crimson Tide won the National Championship by a score of 45–40. Ridley led the SEC in receptions with 89 in 2015.

In the 2016 season, Ridley remained a strong threat for the Crimson Tide. In the second game of the season, he had nine receptions for 129 receiving yards and a touchdown against Western Kentucky. On October 1, Ridley hauled in 11 receptions for 174 yards and two touchdowns against the University of Kentucky. His 11 receptions, 174 yards, and two touchdowns were career highs. Over the remainder of the 2016 season, he had 41 receptions for 371 receiving yards and four touchdowns. Alabama once again won the SEC Championship and made the College Football Playoff. However, they fell to Clemson in a rematch in the National Championship.

In the 2017 season, Ridley started off strong with seven receptions for 82 yards and a touchdown in the 24–7 victory over Florida State. On November 11, against Mississippi State, he had five receptions for 171 receiving yards in the victory. Alabama made the College Football Playoff once again in the 2017 season. In the National Semifinal, Ridley had four receptions for 39 yards in the Sugar Bowl. In the National Championship against Georgia, he had four receptions for 32 yards and the late game-tying touchdown to help force overtime in the 26–23 victory.

On January 10, 2018, it was announced that Ridley would forgo his senior year at Alabama in favor of the 2018 NFL draft.

== Professional career ==
Pre-draft measurables
Height	Weight	Arm length	Hand span	Wingspan	40-yard dash	10-yard split	20-yard split	20-yard shuttle	Three-cone drill	Vertical jump	Broad jump	Bench press
6 ft 0 1/2 in (1.84 m)	189 lb (86 kg)	31 5/8 in (0.80 m)	9 1/8 in (0.23 m)	6 ft 3 3/4 in (1.92 m)	4.43 s	1.53 s	2.60 s	4.37 s	6.88 s	31.0 in (0.79 m)	9 ft 2 in (2.79 m)	15 reps
All values from NFL Combine/Pro Day

=== Atlanta Falcons ===
Ridley getting drafted in 2018

Ridley was drafted by the Atlanta Falcons in the first round with the 26th overall pick in the 2018 NFL Draft. On July 5, 2018, Ridley signed a four-year deal worth $10.9 million featuring a $6.1 million signing bonus.

==== 2018 season ====
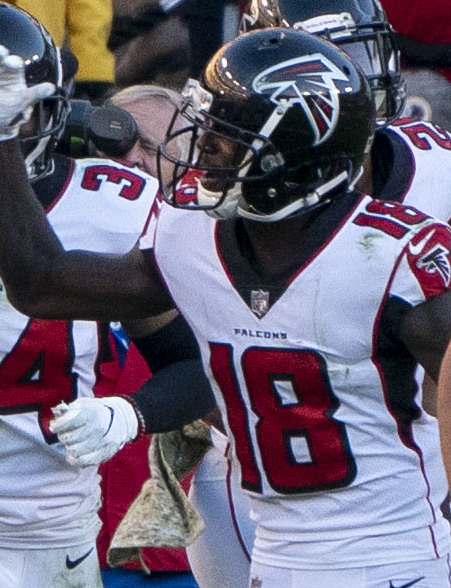
Ridley in a game against the Washington Redskins

After a quiet NFL debut against the Philadelphia Eagles in Week 1, he had four receptions for 64 yards and his first NFL touchdown in a 31–24 victory over the Carolina Panthers. On September 23, in Week 3, Ridley recorded seven receptions for 146 yards and three touchdowns in a 43–37 overtime loss to the New Orleans Saints. He followed that up with four receptions for 54 yards and two touchdowns in the next game against the Cincinnati Bengals.

Ridley was named the Offensive Rookie of the Month for September after collecting six touchdown receptions, which was the most in the league and tied an NFL record for a rookie in his first four games. In Week 17 against the Tampa Bay Buccaneers, Ridley broke the Falcons single-season receiving touchdowns by a rookie record after scoring 10 touchdowns. The record was previously set by Junior Miller in 1980. Ridley finished the 2018 season leading all rookies in both receiving yards and receiving touchdowns, as well as leading all rookie wide receivers in receptions. He was named to PFWA All-Rookie Team, becoming the fourth Atlanta Falcons receiver to get this award, joining Shawn Collins (1989), Mike Pritchard (1991), and Julio Jones (2011).

==== 2019 season ====
In Week 1 against the Minnesota Vikings, Ridley caught four passes for 64 yards and the first receiving touchdown of the season as the Falcons lost 12–28. In Week 2 against the Philadelphia Eagles, Ridley caught eight passes for 105 yards and a touchdown as the Falcons won 24–20. In Week 11 against the Panthers, Ridley finished with eight catches for 143 receiving yards and a touchdown as the Falcons won 29–3. In Week 14 against the Panthers, Ridley had five catches for 76 receiving yards and a touchdown in the 40–20 win. Ridley suffered an abdominal injury during the game and was ruled out for the rest of the season. Overall, Ridley finished the 2019 season with 63 receptions for 866 receiving yards and seven receiving touchdowns.

==== 2020 season ====
In Week 1 against the Seattle Seahawks, Ridley recorded a career-high nine receptions for 130 yards and two receiving touchdowns as the Falcons lost 25–38. In Week 2 against the Dallas Cowboys, Ridley caught seven passes for 109 yards and two touchdowns during the 39–40 loss. Ridley tied Andre Rison for the franchise record for the most receiving touchdowns in the team's first two games of a season with four. Ridley posted his third consecutive 100-yard game in Week 3, posting five receptions for 110 receiving yards in a 26–30 loss to the Chicago Bears. In the following week's game against the Panthers, Ridley continued his early season form, recording eight catches for 136 yards during the 23–16 loss.

In Week 14 against the Los Angeles Chargers, Ridley recorded eight catches for 124 yards and a touchdown during the 20–17 loss. In Week 15 against the Buccaneers, Ridley recorded ten catches for 163 yards and a touchdown during the 31–27 loss. In Week 16 against the Kansas City Chiefs, Ridley recorded five catches for 130 yards during the 17–14 loss. Ridley was named to the Associated Press' All-Pro 2nd Team for his performance during the 2020 season. He finished the 2020 season with 90 receptions for 1,374 yards and nine receiving touchdowns. He was ranked 65th by his fellow players on the NFL Top 100 Players of 2021.

In March 2023, Ridley revealed that he had played the majority of the 2020 season with a broken foot.

==== 2021 season ====
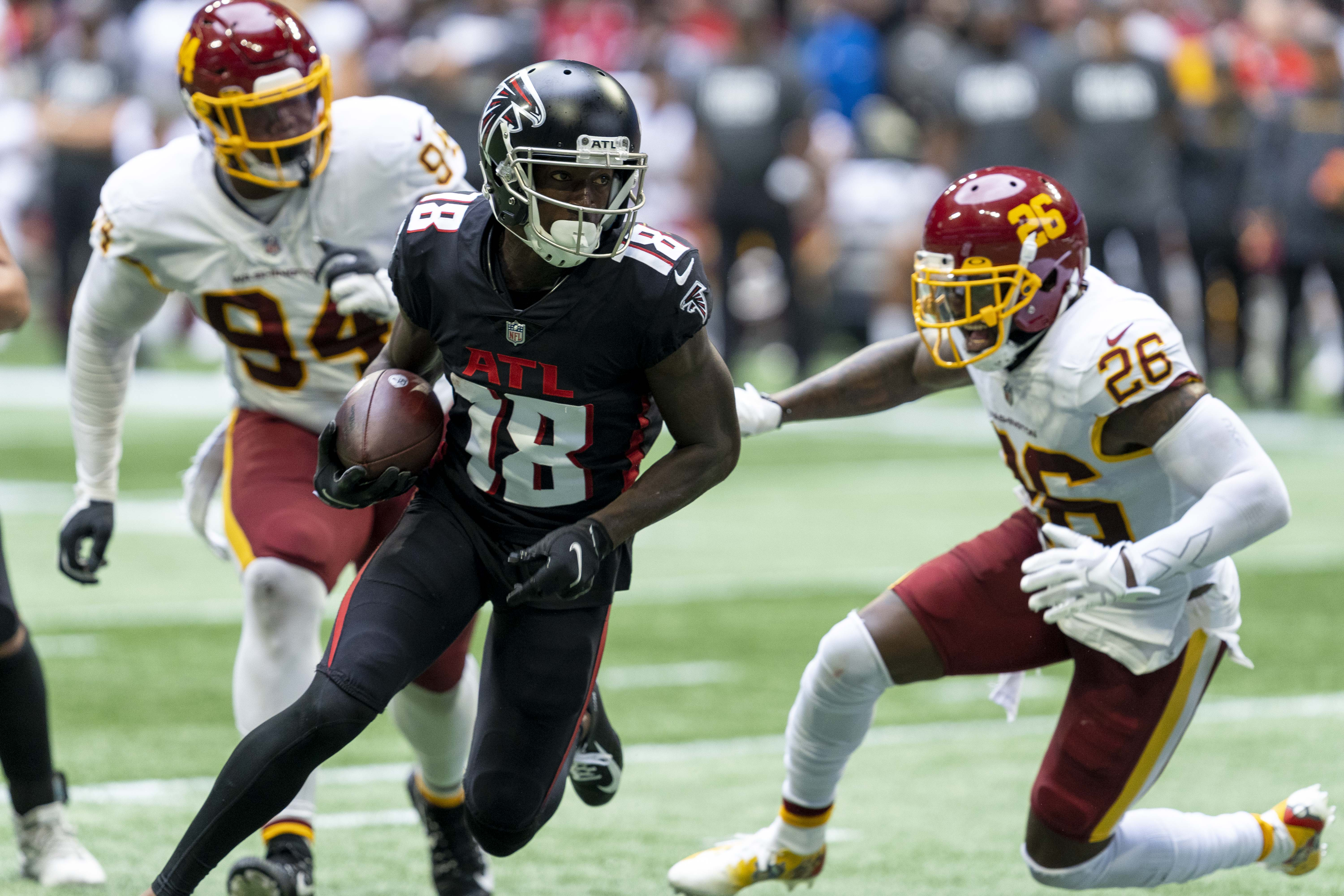
Ridley playing against the Washington Football Team in 2021

On May 3, 2021, the Falcons exercised the fifth-year option on Ridley's contract. The option guaranteed a salary of $11.1 million for the 2022 season.

In Week 1 against the Philadelphia Eagles, Ridley caught 5 passes for 51 yards in the 32–6 loss. Against the Buccaneers in Week 2, Ridley caught his first receiving touchdown of the season to go along with 7 receptions for 63 yards. The next week against the New York Giants, Ridley had 8 receptions for 61 yards as the Falcons picked up their first win of the season, winning 17–14. After not traveling with the Falcons for their London game against the New York Jets the previous week due to an undisclosed personal matter, Ridley returned on October 24 against the Miami Dolphins, catching four passes for 26 yards and a touchdown, helping the Falcons win 30–28.

On October 31, Ridley announced on Twitter that he was stepping away from football due to mental-health reasons. Ridley finished the season with 31 receptions for 281 receiving yards and two receiving touchdowns in five games played.

=== Suspension ===
"I just f***ed up. Period. In a dark moment, I made a stupid mistake. I wasn't trying to cheat the game. That's the thing I want to make clear. At the time, I had been completely away from the team for about a month. I was still just so depressed and angry, and the days were so long. I was looking for anything to take my mind off of things and make the day go by faster."

— Ridley, via The Players' Tribune

The NFL announced on March 7, 2022, that Ridley would be suspended indefinitely through at least the conclusion of the 2022 season for betting on games in the previous season, including on his own team. He forfeited his base salary of $11.1 million for 2022.

=== Jacksonville Jaguars ===
On November 1, 2022, despite being suspended for at least the entire 2022 season, the Falcons traded Ridley to the Jacksonville Jaguars for conditional 2023 sixth-round and 2024 fourth-round picks. The 2023 pick was to become a fifth-rounder if Ridley was reinstated and the 2024 pick could have either become a third-round pick based on playing time or a second-round pick if he signed a long-term extension.

On February 15, 2023, Ridley applied for reinstatement, his first day eligible to do so. He was officially reinstated on March 6, just a day before the first anniversary of his initial suspension. Shortly after, Ridley announced he would be changing his jersey number to 0 after the NFL's jersey numbering system was modified to allow the number 0 to be worn, becoming the first player in franchise history to have the number.

On September 10, 2023, Ridley made his Jaguars debut in Week 1 against the Indianapolis Colts. In his first game in 686 days, Ridley caught eight passes for 101 yards and a receiving touchdown as the Jaguars won 31–21. In Week 11 against the Titans, he had seven receptions for 103 yards and two touchdowns in the win. He had two receiving touchdowns in a Week 16 loss to the Buccaneers. He finished the 2023 season with 76 receptions for 1,016 yards and eight touchdowns.

=== Tennessee Titans ===
On March 15, 2024, Ridley signed a four-year $92 million deal with the Tennessee Titans. He finished the 2024 season with 64 receptions for 1,017 yards and four touchdowns.

On October 5, 2025, against the Cardinals, Ridley had five receptions for 131 yards in the 22–21 win. On November 16, 2025, against the Houston Texans, Ridley was injured on the Titans' first play from scrimmage after catching a pass from Cam Ward. He was carted off the field and did not return. During the post game press conference, head coach Mike McCoy confirmed Ridley broke his fibula and would miss the rest of the season. He made seven appearances (six starts) for the team prior to his injury, recording 17 receptions for 303 yards and no touchdowns.

== Career statistics ==
=== NFL ===
Year	Team	Games		Receiving						Rushing					Fumbles	
Year	Team	GP	GS	Tgt	Rec	Yds	Avg	Lng	TD	Att	Yds	Avg	Lng	TD	Fum	Lost
2018	ATL	16	5	92	64	821	12.8	75	10	6	27	4.5	9	0	2	1
2019	ATL	13	10	93	63	866	13.7	36	7	2	34	17.0	19	0	0	0
2020	ATL	15	15	143	90	1,374	15.3	63	9	5	1	0.2	8	0	1	1
2021	ATL	5	5	52	31	281	9.1	22	2	—	—	—	—	—	0	0
2022	ATL	Suspended														
2022	JAX	Suspended														
2023	JAX	17	17	136	76	1,016	13.4	59	8	9	23	2.6	18	0	1	0
2024	TEN	17	14	120	64	1,017	15.8	63	4	8	55	6.9	19	1	1	1
2025	TEN	7	6	36	17	303	17.8	47	0	—	—	—	—	—	0	0
2026	TEN	8	5	13	6	91	15.2	25	0	—	—	—	—	—	0	0
Career		98	77	652	411	5,769	14.0	75	40	30	140	4.7	19	1	5	3

=== College ===
Season	Team	GP	Receiving			
Season	Team	GP	Rec	Yds	Avg	TD
2015	Alabama	15	89	1,045	11.7	7
2016	Alabama	15	72	769	10.7	7
2017	Alabama	14	63	967	15.3	5
Career		44	224	2,781	12.4	19

== Career highlights ==
=== Awards and honors ===
NFL

- Second-team All-Pro (2020)
- PFWA All-Rookie Team (2018)
- Ranked No. 65 in the Top 100 Players of 2021

College

- 2× CFP national champion (2015, 2017)
- Freshman All-American (2015)
- First-team All-SEC (2017)
- 2× Second-team All-SEC (2015, 2016)

=== Records ===
NFL records

- Most receiving touchdowns by a rookie in his first four games: 6 (Tied with Martavis Bryant – 2014)

Falcons franchise records

- Most receiving touchdowns in a season by a rookie: 10
- Most receiving touchdowns in the first two games of a season: 4 (Tied with Andre Rison – 1994)

== Personal life ==
Ridley is married and has a daughter who was born in 2020.

On September 12, 2021, the Ridley's home was burgled while he was playing against the Philadelphia Eagles. Ridley developed anxiety following the robbery.
