= Richard Mullaney =

American football player (born 1993)

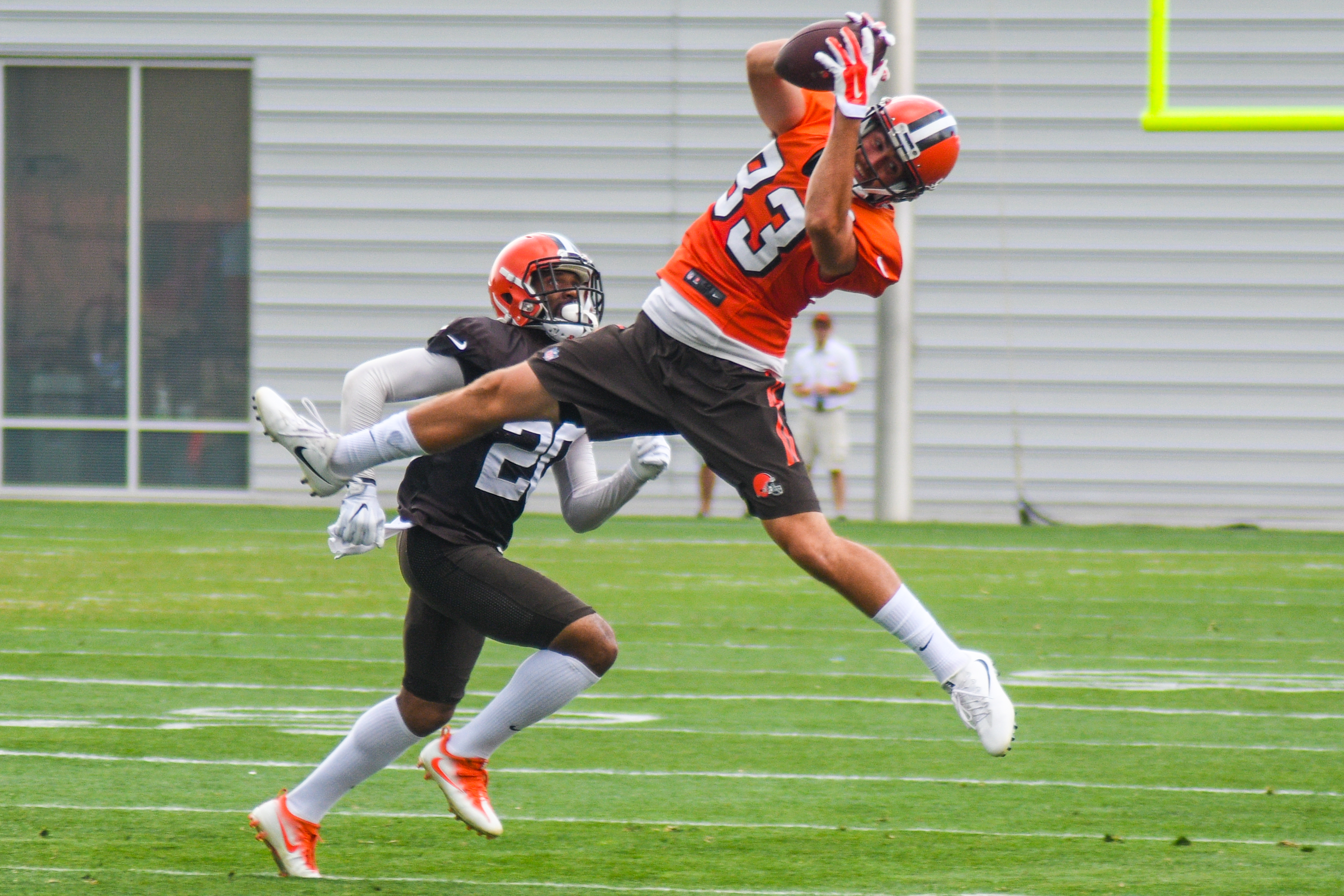
- Mullaney with the Cleveland Browns in 2017

No. 16, 83
- Position: Wide receiver

Personal information
- Born: February 23, 1993 (age 33); Valencia, California, U.S.
- Listed height: 6 ft 3 in (1.91 m)
- Listed weight: 208 lb (94 kg)

Career information
- High school: Thousand Oaks (CA)
- College: Alabama
- NFL draft: 2016: undrafted

Career history
- Houston Texans (2016)*; Dallas Cowboys (2016)*; Cleveland Browns (2017)*; Arizona Hotshots (2019); DC Defenders (2020)*
- * Offseason or practice squad member only

Awards and highlights
- CFP national champion (2015)

Richard Mullaney (born February 23, 1993) is an American former football wide receiver. He played college football at Oregon State and Alabama, and signed with the Houston Texans as an undrafted free agent in 2016. He was also a member of the Dallas Cowboys, Cleveland Browns, Arizona Hotshots, and DC Defenders.

== College career ==
Mullaney committed to Oregon State and then transferred to Alabama totaling 10 touchdowns throughout his career. He caught 38 passes for 390 yards and a career high 5 touchdowns as a senior en route to a National Championship with the 2015 Alabama Crimson Tide football team.

== Professional career ==
=== Houston Texans ===
On May 6, 2016, Mullaney signed with the Houston Texans after going undrafted in the 2016 NFL draft, but was waived by the team on July 25.

=== Dallas Cowboys ===
On August 16, 2016, Mullaney was signed by the Dallas Cowboys, only to be waived on August 30.

=== Cleveland Browns ===
On June 12, 2017, Mullaney was signed by the Cleveland Browns. He was waived by Cleveland on September 1, during roster cutdowns.

=== Arizona Hotshots ===
In 2018, Mullaney signed with the Arizona Hotshots for the 2019 season. The league ceased operations in April 2019.

=== DC Defenders ===
During the 2020 XFL draft in October 2019, Mullaney was selected by the DC Defenders in the open phase. He was placed on a reserve list before the start of the regular season and waived on February 18, 2020.
