= 2015 Alabama Crimson Tide football team =

American college football season

2015 Alabama Crimson Tide football

Consensus national champion SEC champion SEC Western Division champion Cotton Bowl Classic champion

SEC Championship Game, W 29–15 vs. Florida

Cotton Bowl Classic (CFP Semifinal), W 38–0 vs. Michigan State CFP National Championship, W 45–40 vs. Clemson
- Conference: Southeastern Conference
- Western Division

Ranking
- Coaches: No. 1
- AP: No. 1
- Record: 14–1 (7–1 SEC)
- Head coach: Nick Saban (9th season)
- Offensive coordinator: Lane Kiffin (2nd season)
- Offensive scheme: Multiple
- Defensive coordinator: Kirby Smart (8th season)
- Base defense: 3–4
- Home stadium: Bryant–Denny Stadium

2015 Southeastern Conference football standings
	Conf.			Overall
Team	W		L	W		L
Eastern Division
No. 25 Florida x	7	–	1	10	–	4
No. 22 Tennessee	5	–	3	9	–	4
Georgia	5	–	3	10	–	3
Vanderbilt	2	–	6	4	–	8
Kentucky	2	–	6	5	–	7
Missouri*	1	–	7	5	–	7
South Carolina	1	–	7	3	–	9
Western Division
No. 1 Alabama x$#^	7	–	1	14	–	1
No. 10 Ole Miss	6	–	2	10	–	3
Arkansas	5	–	3	8	–	5
No. 16 LSU *	5	–	3	9	–	3
Texas A&M	4	–	4	8	–	5
Mississippi State	4	–	4	9	–	4
Auburn	2	–	6	7	–	6
Championship: Alabama 29, Florida 15
# – College Football Playoff champion; ^ – College Football Playoff participant; $ – Conference champion; x – Division champion/co-champions; * LSU and Missouri vacated all wins due to NCAA violations.; Rankings from AP Poll

The 2015 Alabama Crimson Tide football team represented the University of Alabama in the 2015 NCAA Division I FBS football season. It marked the Crimson Tide's 121st overall season, 82nd as a member of the Southeastern Conference (SEC) and its 24th within the SEC Western Division. The team played its home games at Bryant–Denny Stadium in Tuscaloosa, Alabama. They were led by ninth-year head coach Nick Saban. They finished the season with a record of 14 wins and 1 loss (14–1 overall, 7–1 in the SEC), as SEC champions and as consensus national champions after they defeated Clemson in the College Football Playoff (CFP) National Championship Game. Alabama also secured its 10th Associated Press (AP) national title. Running back Derrick Henry became Alabama's second Heisman Trophy recipient. He led the nation in both rushing yards (2,219) and rushing touchdowns (28).

== Offseason ==
=== Departures ===
Notable departures from the 2014 squad included juniors Amari Cooper, T. J. Yeldon, and Landon Collins, who all forwent their final year of eligibility and declared for the 2015 NFL draft.

Name	Number	Position	Height	Weight	Year	Hometown	Notes
T. J. Yeldon	4	Running back	6'1"	226	Junior	Daphne, AL	Declared for the 2015 NFL draft
Amari Cooper	9	Wide receiver	6'1"	211	Junior	Miami, FL	Declared for the 2015 NFL draft
Landon Collins	26	Defensive back	6'0"	228	Junior	New Orleans, LA	Declared for the 2015 NFL draft
DeAndrew White	2	Wide receiver	5'11"	193	Senior	Houston, TX	Undrafted Free Agent.
Blake Sims	6	Quarterback	5'11"	218	Senior	Gainesville, GA	Undrafted Free Agent
Jarrick Williams	20	Defensive back	6'1"	209	Senior	Mobile, AL	Undrafted Free Agent
Christion Jones	22	Wide receiver/return specialist	5'10"	182	Senior	Adamsville, AL	Undrafted Free Agent
Trey DePriest	33	Linebacker	6'0"	254	Senior	Springfield, OH	Undrafted Free Agent
Jalston Fowler	45	Fullback	6'1"	248	Senior	Mobile, AL	Declared for the 2015 NFL draft
Xzavier Dickson	47	Linebacker	6'3"	260	Senior	Griffin, GA	Declared for the 2015 NFL draft
Leon Brown	72	Offensive tackle	6'6"	320	Senior	Riverdale, MD	Undrafted Free Agent
Arie Kouandjio	77	Offensive guard	6'5"	310	Senior	Hyattsville, MD	Declared for the 2015 NFL draft
Austin Shepherd	79	Offensive tackle	6'4"	315	Senior	Buford, GA	Declared for the 2015 NFL draft
Brian Vogler	84	Tight end	6'7"	263	Senior	Columbus, GA	Undrafted Free Agent
Brandon Ivory	99	Defensive tackle	6'4"	311	Senior	Memphis, TN	Undrafted Free Agent

=== 2015 recruiting class ===
Prior to National Signing Day in February 2015, eight players enrolled for the spring semester in order to participate in spring practice and included six former high school seniors and two junior college transfers. On National Signing Day, Alabama signed 18 additional players out of high school that completed the 2015 recruiting class. The class was highlighted by 19 players from the "ESPN 300": . Alabama signed the No. 1 recruiting class according to ESPN.com and 247Sports.com, and No. 2 according to "Rivals.com" and "Scout.com" behind USC.

College recruiting (2015)
Name	Hometown	School	Height	Weight	40^{‡}	Commit date
Blake Barnett #1 QB	Corona, CA	Santiago HS	6 ft 5 in (1.96 m)	200 lb (91 kg)	–	Jun 18, 2015
Blake Barnett #1 QB	Recruit ratings: Scout: Rivals: 247Sports: ESPN:					
Kendall Sheffield #3 CB	Missouri City, TX	Thurgood Marshall HS	6 ft 0 in (1.83 m)	180 lb (82 kg)	–	Jan 2, 2015
Kendall Sheffield #3 CB	Recruit ratings: Scout: Rivals: 247Sports: ESPN:					
Calvin Ridley #1 WR	Coconut Creek, FL	Monarch HS	6 ft 1 in (1.85 m)	169 lb (77 kg)	–	Apr 19, 2014
Calvin Ridley #1 WR	Recruit ratings: Scout: Rivals: 247Sports: ESPN:					
Minkah Fitzpatrick #4 CB	Jersey City, NJ	Saint Peters Prep	6 ft 1 in (1.85 m)	194 lb (88 kg)	–	Apr 19, 2015
Minkah Fitzpatrick #4 CB	Recruit ratings: Scout: Rivals: 247Sports: ESPN:					
Damien Harris #2 RB	Berea, KY	Madison Southern HS	5 ft 10 in (1.78 m)	208 lb (94 kg)	–	Jan 9, 2015
Damien Harris #2 RB	Recruit ratings: Scout: Rivals: 247Sports: ESPN:					
Adonis Thomas #5 OLB	Lawrenceville, GA	Central Gwinnett HS	6 ft 4 in (1.93 m)	219 lb (99 kg)	–	Dec 8, 2014
Adonis Thomas #5 OLB	Recruit ratings: Scout: Rivals: 247Sports: ESPN:					
Daylon Charlot #8 WR	Patterson, LA	Patterson HS	6 ft 0 in (1.83 m)	177 lb (80 kg)	–	Feb 4, 2015
Daylon Charlot #8 WR	Recruit ratings: Scout: Rivals: 247Sports: ESPN:					
Deionte Thompson #3 S	Orange, TX	West Orange-Stark HS	6 ft 1 in (1.85 m)	175 lb (79 kg)	–	Feb 23, 2013
Deionte Thompson #3 S	Recruit ratings: Scout: Rivals: 247Sports: ESPN:					
Brandon Kennedy #5 OG	Wetumpka, AL	Wetumpka HS	6 ft 3 in (1.91 m)	285 lb (129 kg)	–	Jul 18, 2014
Brandon Kennedy #5 OG	Recruit ratings: Scout: Rivals: 247Sports: ESPN:					
Mekhi Brown #10 OLB	Columbus, GA	Carver HS	6 ft 5 in (1.96 m)	218 lb (99 kg)	–	Apr 8, 2013
Mekhi Brown #10 OLB	Recruit ratings: Scout: Rivals: 247Sports: ESPN:					
Lester Cotton #7 OG	Tuscaloosa, AL	Tuscaloosa Central HS	6 ft 4 in (1.93 m)	328 lb (149 kg)	–	Feb 1, 2014
Lester Cotton #7 OG	Recruit ratings: Scout: Rivals: 247Sports: ESPN:					
Daron Payne #9 DT	Birmingham, AL	Shades Valley HS	6 ft 3 in (1.91 m)	348 lb (158 kg)	–	Jan 2, 2015
Daron Payne #9 DT	Recruit ratings: Scout: Rivals: 247Sports: ESPN:					
DeSherrius Flowers #10 RB	Prichard, AL	Vigor HS	6 ft 0 in (1.83 m)	210 lb (95 kg)	–	Apr 15, 2013
DeSherrius Flowers #10 RB	Recruit ratings: Scout: Rivals: 247Sports: ESPN:					
Hale Hentges #3 TE-Y	Jefferson City, MO	Helias HS	6 ft 4 in (1.93 m)	230 lb (100 kg)	–	May 25, 2014
Hale Hentges #3 TE-Y	Recruit ratings: Scout: Rivals: 247Sports: ESPN:					
Richie Petitbon #10 OG	Washington, D.C.	Gonzaga College HS	6 ft 4 in (1.93 m)	313 lb (142 kg)	–	Apr 4, 2014
Richie Petitbon #10 OG	Recruit ratings: Scout: Rivals: 247Sports: ESPN:					
Shawn Burgess-Becker #7 S	Coconut Creek, FL	Monarch HS	6 ft 0 in (1.83 m)	200 lb (91 kg)	–	Apr 19, 2014
Shawn Burgess-Becker #7 S	Recruit ratings: Scout: Rivals: 247Sports: ESPN:					
Joshua McMillon #5 ILB	Memphis, TN	Whitehaven	6 ft 3 in (1.91 m)	249 lb (113 kg)	–	Aug 22, 2014
Joshua McMillon #5 ILB	Recruit ratings: Scout: Rivals: 247Sports: ESPN:					
Dallas Warmack #19 OG	Atlanta, GA	Benjamin E. Mays HS	6 ft 2 in (1.88 m)	306 lb (139 kg)	–	Jul 22, 2013
Dallas Warmack #19 OG	Recruit ratings: Scout: Rivals: 247Sports: ESPN:					
Anfernee Jennings #28 DE	Dadeville, AL	Dadeville HS	6 ft 3 in (1.91 m)	245 lb (111 kg)	–	Mar 6, 2014
Anfernee Jennings #28 DE	Recruit ratings: Scout: Rivals: 247Sports: ESPN:					
Ronnie Harrison #25 S	Tallahassee, FL	Florida HS	6 ft 2 in (1.88 m)	192 lb (87 kg)	–	Jul 29, 2014
Ronnie Harrison #25 S	Recruit ratings: Scout: Rivals: 247Sports: ESPN:					
Keaton Anderson #29 OLB	Florence, AL	Florence HS	6 ft 1 in (1.85 m)	215 lb (98 kg)	–	May 29, 2014
Keaton Anderson #29 OLB	Recruit ratings: Scout: Rivals: 247Sports: ESPN:					
Matt Womack #59 OT	Senatobia, MS	Magnolia Heights School	6 ft 6 in (1.98 m)	325 lb (147 kg)	–	Dec 14, 2014
Matt Womack #59 OT	Recruit ratings: Scout: Rivals: 247Sports: ESPN:					
Overall recruit ranking: Scout: 1 Rivals: 1 247Sports: 1 ESPN: 1
‡ Refers to 40-yard dash; Note: In many cases, Scout, Rivals, 247Sports, On3, and ESPN may conflict in their listings of height, weight and 40 time.; In these cases, the average was taken. ESPN grades are on a 100-point scale.; Sources: "Alabama Signee List 2015". Rivals.; "Scout.com Football Recruiting: Alabama". Scout.; "2015 Player Signees – Alabama". ESPN.; "Scout.com Team Recruiting Rankings". Scout.; "2015 Team Ranking". Rivals.com.; "2015 Alabama Crimson Tide football team". 247Sports.

=== Returning starters ===
Alabama had seven returning players on offense, five on defense and five on special teams that started games in 2014.

==== Offense ====
Player	Class	Position
Derrick Henry	Junior	Running back
Ryan Kelly	Senior	Center
Cam Robinson	Sophomore	Offensive Tackle
O. J. Howard	Junior	Tight End

==== Defense ====
Player	Class	Position
Geno Matias-Smith	Senior	Safety
Cyrus Jones	Senior	Cornerback
Jarran Reed	Senior	Defensive End
A'Shawn Robinson	Junior	Defensive tackle
Jonathan Allen	Junior	Defensive End
Reggie Ragland	Senior	Linebacker

==== Special teams ====
Player	Class	Position
Adam Griffith	Junior	Placekicker
J. K. Scott	Sophomore	Punter
Cole Mazza	Junior	Long Snapper

=== Spring practice ===
2015 A-Day Spring Game

Team	1	2	3	4	Total
• White	7	0	10	10	27
Crimson	7	0	0	7	14

- Location: Tuscaloosa, Alabama
- Game start: 2:00 p.m.
- Elapsed time: 2:12
- Television network: ESPNU

Alabama started spring practice on March 16 and concluded 15 practices later on April 18 with the annual A-Day game.

== Coaching staff ==
Alabama head coach Nick Saban entered his ninth year as the Crimson Tide's head coach for the 2015 season. During his previous eight years with Alabama, he led the Crimson Tide to an overall record of 86 wins and 17 losses (86–17, .835) and the 2009, 2011 and 2012 national championships.

Name	Position	Consecutive season at Alabama in current position
Nick Saban	Head coach	9th
Burton Burns	Associate head coach, running backs	9th
Lane Kiffin	Offensive coordinator, quarterbacks	2nd
Bo Davis	Defensive line	2nd
Kirby Smart	Defensive coordinator, inside linebackers	9th
Mario Cristobal	Offensive line	3rd
Billy Napier	Wide receivers	3rd
Tosh Lupoi	Outside linebackers	1st
Bobby Williams	Tight ends and special teams	8th
Scott Cochran	Strength and conditioning	9th
Mel Tucker	Assistant head coach and defensive backs	1st

== Players ==
=== Depth chart ===
As of September 5, 2015.

Defense

FS
Eddie Jackson
Ronnie Harrison
Shawn Burgess-Becker

WILL	ILB	ILB	SAM
Dillon Lee	Reggie Ragland	Reuben Foster	Denzel Devall
Rashaan Evans	Keith Holcombe	Shaun Dion Hamilton	Ryan Anderson
Christian Miller	Walker Jones	⋅	Tim Williams

SS
Geno Matias-Smith
Jabriel Washington
Hootie Jones

CB
Marlon Humphrey
Minkah Fitzpatrick
Tony Brown

DE	NT	DE
A'Shawn Robinson	Daron Payne	Jarran Reed
Jonathan Allen	Joshua Frazier	Dalvin Tomlinson
D. J. Pettway	Darren Lake	Da'Shawn Hand

CB
Cyrus Jones
Maurice Smith
Bradley Sylve

Offense

WR
Calvin Ridley
Robert Foster
Chris Black

LT	LG	C	RG	RT
Cam Robinson	Ross Pierschbacher	Ryan Kelly	Alphonse Taylor	Dominick Jackson
Lester Cotton	Dallas Warmack	J. C. Hassenauer	Bradley Bozeman	Brandon Greene
Korren Kirven	Isaac Luatua	Brandon Kennedy	Richie Petibon	Matt Womack

TE
O. J. Howard
Ty Flournoy-Smith
⋅

WR
ArDarius Stewart
Cam Sims
Richard Mullaney

QB
Jake Coker
Cooper Bateman
Alec Morris

RB
Derrick Henry
Kenyan Drake
Damien Harris

FB
Michael Nysewander
Dakota Ball
⋅

Special teams
PK Adam Griffith
P J. K. Scott
KR Kenyan Drake
ArDarius Stewart
PR Cyrus Jones
LS Cole Mazza
H Cooper Bateman

== Schedule ==
The 2015 schedule was released on October 14, 2014. Alabama faced all six Western Division opponents: Arkansas, Auburn, LSU, Mississippi State, Ole Miss, and Texas A&M. They faced two Eastern Division opponents: official SEC rival Tennessee and Georgia. Alabama was not scheduled to play SEC opponents Florida, Kentucky, Missouri, South Carolina or Vanderbilt – although ultimately faced Florida in the SEC Championship Game. They were also scheduled to play four non-conference games: Wisconsin of the Big Ten Conference, Middle Tennessee of Conference USA, Louisiana–Monroe of the Sun Belt Conference and Charleston Southern of the FCS' Big South Conference.

Date	Time	Opponent	Rank	Site	TV	Result	Attendance
September 5	7:00 p.m.	vs. No. 20 Wisconsin*	No. 3	AT&T Stadium; Arlington, TX (Advocare Classic, College GameDay)	ABC	W 35–17	64,279
September 12	3:00 p.m.	Middle Tennessee*	No. 2	Bryant–Denny Stadium; Tuscaloosa, AL	SECN	W 37–10	98,568
September 19	8:15 p.m.	No. 15 Ole Miss	No. 2	Bryant–Denny Stadium; Tuscaloosa, AL (rivalry, College GameDay)	ESPN	L 37–43	101,821
September 26	3:00 p.m.	Louisiana–Monroe*	No. 12	Bryant–Denny Stadium; Tuscaloosa, AL	SECN	W 34–0	101,323
October 3	2:30 p.m.	at No. 8 Georgia	No. 13	Sanford Stadium; Athens, GA (rivalry, SEC Nation)	CBS	W 38–10	92,746
October 10	6:00 p.m.	Arkansas^{†}	No. 8	Bryant–Denny Stadium; Tuscaloosa, AL	ESPN	W 27–14	101,821
October 17	2:30 p.m.	at No. 9 Texas A&M	No. 10	Kyle Field; College Station, TX (SEC Nation)	CBS	W 41–23	105,733
October 24	2:30 p.m.	Tennessee	No. 8	Bryant–Denny Stadium; Tuscaloosa, AL (Third Saturday in October, SEC Nation)	CBS	W 19–14	101,821
November 7	7:00 p.m.	No. 2 LSU	No. 4	Bryant–Denny Stadium; Tuscaloosa, AL (rivalry, College GameDay)	CBS	W 30–16	101,821
November 14	2:30 p.m.	at No. 17 Mississippi State	No. 2	Davis Wade Stadium; Starkville, MS (rivalry, SEC Nation)	CBS	W 31–6	62,435
November 21	3:00 p.m.	Charleston Southern*	No. 2	Bryant–Denny Stadium; Tuscaloosa, AL	SECN	W 56–6	101,821
November 28	2:30 p.m.	at Auburn	No. 2	Jordan–Hare Stadium; Auburn, AL (Iron Bowl, SEC Nation)	CBS	W 29–13	87,451
December 5	3:00 p.m.	vs. No. 18 Florida	No. 2	Georgia Dome; Atlanta, GA (SEC Championship Game, rivalry, SEC Nation)	CBS	W 29–15	75,320
December 31	7:00 p.m.	vs. No. 3 Michigan State*	No. 2	AT&T Stadium; Arlington, TX (Cotton Bowl Classic–CFP Semifinal, SEC Nation)	ESPN	W 38–0	82,812
January 11, 2016	7:30 p.m.	vs. No. 1 Clemson*	No. 2	University of Phoenix Stadium; Glendale, AZ (CFP National Championship, rivalry, College GameDay, SEC Nation)	ESPN	W 45–40	75,765
*Non-conference game; ^{†}Homecoming; Rankings from AP Poll (before 11/3) and CFP Rankings (thereafter); All times are in Central time

== Game summaries ==
=== vs #20 Wisconsin Badgers ===
#20 Wisconsin Badgers vs #3 Alabama Crimson Tide – Game summary

Quarter	1	2	3	4	Total
#20 Wisconsin	0	7	3	7	17
#3 Alabama	7	7	14	7	35

at AT&T Stadium • Arlington, TX

- Date: September 5, 2015
- Game time: 7:14 p.m.
- Game weather: Played indoors (retractable roof closed)
- Game attendance: 64,279
- Referee: Alan Eck
- TV announcers (ABC): Chris Fowler (play-by-play), Kirk Herbstreit (color), Heather Cox (sideline)

Game information

First quarter

- ALA – Derrick Henry, 37-yard run (Adam Griffith kick), 5:54 (ALA 7–0)

Second quarter

- WIS – Alex Erickson, 6-yard pass from Joel Stave (Rafael Gaglianone kick), 11:06 (TIE 7–7)
- ALA – Robert Foster, 17-yard pass from Jake Coker (Adam Griffith kick), 6:39 (ALA 14–7)

Third quarter

- ALA – Derrick Henry, 56-yard run (Adam Griffith kick), 11:42 (ALA 21–7)
- ALA – Derrick Henry, 2-yard run (Adam Griffith kick), 5:17 (ALA 28–7)
- WIS – Rafael Gaglianone, 43-yard field goal, 1:05 (ALA 28–10)

Fourth quarter

- ALA – Kenyan Drake, 43-yard run (Adam Griffith kick), 8:02 (ALA 35–10)
- WIS – Rob Wheelwright, 3-yard pass from Joel Stave (Rafael Gaglianone kick), 4:42 (ALA 35–17)

Passing

- WIS – Joel Stave, 26 completions, 39 attempts, 228 yards, 2 touchdowns, 1 interception
- ALA – Jake Coker, 15 completions, 21 attempts, 213 yards, 1 touchdown

Rushing

- WIS – Alex Erickson, 1 carry, 25 yards
- ALA – Derrick Henry, 13 carries, 147 yards, 3 touchdowns

Receiving

- WIS – Alex Erickson, 6 catches, 73 yards, 1 touchdown
- ALA – Robert Foster, 4 catches, 50 yards, 1 touchdown

Defense

- WIS – Joe Schobert, 13 tackles, 2 sacks, 4 tackles-for-loss
- ALA – Reggie Ragland, 12 tackles

The University of Alabama's junior running back Derrick Henry had a career day, rushing 13 times for 147 yards and three touchdowns to lead the No. 3 Crimson Tide past No. 20 Wisconsin 35–17 in the Advocare Classic inside AT&T Stadium in Arlington, Texas, on Saturday night.

Henry opened up the game's scoring, breaking off a 37-yard run in the first quarter to put Alabama ahead 7–0. He put up two more scores in the third quarter, including a 56-yard touchdown rush that put him over 100 yards for the night, the sixth time in his career he has eclipsed the century mark in a game.

Senior quarterback Jake Coker, making his debut as the Crimson Tide's starting quarterback, was an efficient 15-of-21 for 213 yards and one touchdown to go along with no turnovers. Sophomore Cooper Bateman also saw action in the second half, finishing 7-for-8 with 51 yards.

Defensively, Alabama was dominant at the line of scrimmage, holding the Badgers to just 40 yards rushing on 21 attempts, an average of 1.9 yards per rush. Senior linebacker Reggie Ragland recorded 12 total tackles, including five solo. Additionally, Jonathan Allen had two sacks and the team broke up seven passes on the night.

Overall, the Tide gained 502 yards (264 passing and 238 rushing), picked up 28 first downs, and averaged 7.6 yards per play. Wisconsin totaled 268 yards (228 passing and 40 rushing), along with converting 17 first downs and averaging 4.5 yards per play. The Tide also did not commit a turnover on the night.

Alabama won its season opener for the 97th time in 121 season opening games with the victory. The Tide also moved to 6–0 in neutral-site season opening games.

Alabama : 1–0, 0–0 SEC

=== vs Middle Tennessee Blue Raiders ===
Middle Tennessee Blue Raiders at #2 Alabama Crimson Tide – Game summary

Quarter	1	2	3	4	Total
Middle Tennessee	0	3	0	7	10
#2 Alabama	7	16	14	0	37

at Bryant–Denny Stadium • Tuscaloosa, AL

- Date: September 12, 2015
- Game time: 3:01 p.m.
- Game weather: 81, Partly Cloudy, Wind NNW 13 mph
- Game attendance: 98,568
- Referee: Marc Curles
- TV announcers (SEC Network): Tom Hart (play-by-play), Andre Ware (color), Laura Rutledge (sideline)

Game information

First quarter

- ALA – Robert Foster, 19-yard pass from Jake Coker (Adam Griffith kick), 12:28 (ALA 7–0)

Second quarter

- MTU – Cody Clark, 20-yard field goal, 13:00 (ALA 7–3)
- ALA – Derrick Henry, 2-yard run (Adam Griffith kick), 9:14 (ALA 14–3)
- ALA – Derrick Henry, 1-yard run (Adam Griffith kick), 5:54 (ALA 21–3)
- ALA – Trevor Owens punt blocked by Ronnie Harrison for a SAFETY, 2:39 (ALA 23–3)

Third quarter

- ALA – Kenyan Drake, 14 yard pass from Cooper Bateman, 10:54 (ALA 30–3)
- ALA – Derrick Henry, 28-yard run (Adam Griffith kick) 1:33 (ALA 37–3)

Fourth quarter

- MTU – Rod Ducksworth, 15 yard pass from Brent Stockstill (Cody Clark kick), 6:11 (ALA 37–10)

Top passers

- MTU – Brent Stockstill, 42 attempts, 21 completions, 174 yards, 1 interception
- ALA – Jake Coker, 15 attempts, 26 completions, 214 yards, 1 touchdown, 1 interception

Top rushers

- MTU – Brent Stockstill, 5 carries, 29 yards
- ALA – Derrick Henry, 18 carries, 96 yards, 3 touchdowns

Top receiving

- MTU – Richie James, 10 receptions, 95 yards
- ALA – Kenyan Drake, 5 receptions, 91 yards, 1 touchdown

The No. 2-ranked Alabama Crimson Tide (2–0) opened its 2015 home slate in impressive fashion, forcing four turnovers en route to a 37–10 victory over visiting Middle Tennessee (1–1) in front of 98,568 fans at Bryant–Denny Stadium on Saturday afternoon.

After a shaky opening quarter by both teams, the Crimson Tide was able to extend a 7–3 lead to a 23–3 halftime margin. Senior quarterback Jake Coker, who had another solid game, hit Robert Foster for a 19-yard touchdown to open the scoring. Derrick Henry added touchdown runs of 1 and 2 yards in the second quarter, and he reached the end zone a third time thanks to a 28-yard burst in the third quarter. Sophomore quarterback Cooper Bateman recorded his first touchdown pass of his career, connecting with Kenyan Drake on a shovel pass for a 14-yard scoring play as well.

Defensively, Alabama recovered all three fumbles it forced while also getting one interception, the most turnovers an Alabama defensive has forced since September 8, 2012, against Western Kentucky. Senior linebacker Reggie Ragland led the team in tackles once again, recording a total of 7.5, including six solos. The secondary also broke up six passes.

For the game, Alabama totaled 532 yards (312 passing and 220 rushing), notched 28 first downs and averaged 6.5 yards per play. Middle Tennessee gained 275 yards (189 passing and 86 rushing), along with collecting 15 first downs and averaging 3.7 yards per play. The Tide limited its penalties on the day, being flagged only five times for 40 yards.

Alabama: 2–0, 0–0 SEC

=== vs #15 Ole Miss Rebels ===
#15 Ole Miss Rebels at #2 Alabama Crimson Tide – Game summary

Quarter	1	2	3	4	Total
#15 Ole Miss	3	14	13	13	43
#2 Alabama	0	10	7	20	37

at Bryant–Denny Stadium • Tuscaloosa, AL

- Date: September 19, 2015
- Game time: 8:21 p.m.
- Game weather: 75, Clear Skies, Wind 1 mph
- Game attendance: 101,821
- Referee: Tom Ritter
- TV announcers (ESPN): Chris Fowler (play-by-play), Kirk Herbstreit (color), Heather Cox (sideline)
- Sources

Game information

First quarter

Second quarter

Third quarter

Fourth quarter

Top passers

- MISS – Chad Kelly 33 attempts,18 completions, 341 yards, 3 touchdowns
- ALA – Jake Coker 45 attempts, 21 completions, 201 yards, 3 touchdowns, 2 interceptions

Top rushers

- MISS – Jordan Wilkins 7 carries, 39 yards, 1 touchdown
- ALA – Derrick Henry 23 carries, 127 yards, 1 touchdown

Top Receiving

- MISS – Cody Core 4 receptions, 123 yards, 1 touchdown
- ALA – ArDarius Stewart 8 receptios, 73 yards, 1 touchdown

The No. 2-ranked Alabama Crimson Tide could not overcome five turnovers in its SEC opener, falling by a final score of 43–37 to the No. 15/11 Ole Miss Rebels (3–0; 1–0) in a back-and-forth contest in front of a sellout crowd of 101,821 on Saturday night at Bryant–Denny Stadium in Tuscaloosa.

The opening kickoff of the game would set the tone for Alabama, as a fumble by sophomore receiver ArDarius Stewart on the return was recovered by Ole Miss. The Rebels were able to turn that into three points, the only points of the quarter. The Tide evened the score early in the second quarter, but two more turnovers in the quarter allowed the Rebels to take advantage of short fields to reach the end zone twice. Alabama was playing from behind for the rest of the game, twice getting within six points, but unable to complete the comeback.

For the game, the Tide offense totaled 503 yards (288 passing and 215 rushing), picked up 29 first downs and averaged an even 5.0 yards per play. Ole Miss gained 433 yards (341 passing and 92 rushing), along with converting 16 first downs and averaging 6.7 yards per play. Alabama limited its penalties again, getting flagged just four times for 36 yards, but lost the turnover battle by a 5–0 margin.

Alabama: 2–1, 0–1 SEC

=== vs Louisiana–Monroe Warhawks ===
Louisiana–Monroe Warhawks at #12 Alabama Crimson Tide – Game summary

Quarter	1	2	3	4	Total
Louisiana–Monroe	0	0	0	0	0
#12 Alabama	7	7	10	10	34

at Bryant–Denny Stadium • Tuscaloosa, AL

- Date: September 26, 2015
- Game time: 3:01 p.m.
- Game weather: 81, Partly Cloudy, Wind ENE 6 mph
- Game attendance: 101,323
- Referee: Matt Loeffler
- TV announcers (SEC Network): Dave Neal (play-by-play), Matt Stinchcomb (color), Kayce Smith (sideline)
- Sources

Game information

First quarter

Second quarter

Third quarter

Fourth quarter

Top passers

- ULM – Garrett Smith (17/37, 74 yds, 0 TD)
- ALA – Jake Coker (17/31, 158 yds, 3 TD, 1 INT)

Top rushers

- ULM –
- ALA –

Top Receiving

- ULM – Ajalen Holly (9 catches, 38 yds)
- ALA – ArDarius Stewart (3 catches, 39 yds, 1 TD)

The 12th-ranked Alabama Crimson Tide shut out the visiting ULM Warhawks (1–2; 0–0 in the Sun Belt Conference) by a final score of 34–0 in front of 101,323 fans at Bryant–Denny Stadium on Saturday afternoon.

The Tide got off to another slow start offensively, getting on the board with 2:38 remaining in the first quarter thanks to a three-yard run by junior running back Derrick Henry. Senior quarterback Jacob Coker found freshman wide receiver Calvin Ridley for a touchdown early in the second quarter, the first of the rookie's career. In the second half, Alabama was able to put the game away. Junior placekicker Adam Griffith made field goals of 35 and 40 yards, and Coker tossed two more touchdowns.

Defensively, the Tide dominated ULM. For the game, the Alabama defense allowed a total of 92 yards from scrimmage, the fewest yards given up by an Alabama defense since the 2012 BCS Championship Game against LSU, when the Tigers also gained 92 yards of offense. The defense also recorded six quarterback sacks and 12 tackles for loss.

Alabama gained 303 yards total yards (166 passing and 137 rushing) and converted 17 first downs. The Warhawks picked up 83 yards through the air and nine on the ground, along with gaining 10 first downs.

Alabama: 3–1, 0–1 SEC

=== @ #8 Georgia Bulldogs ===
#13 Alabama Crimson Tide at #8 Georgia Bulldogs – Game summary

Quarter	1	2	3	4	Total
#13 Alabama	3	21	14	0	38
#8 Georgia	0	3	7	0	10

at Sanford Stadium • Athens, GA

- Date: October 3, 2015
- Game time: 3:39 p.m.
- Game weather: 60, Rain, Wind NE 6 mph
- Game attendance: 92,746
- Referee: Hubert Owens
- TV announcers (CBS): Verne Lundquist (play-by-play), Gary Danielson (color), Allie LaForce (sideline)
- Sources

Game information

First quarter

Second quarter

Third quarter

Fourth quarter

Top passers

- ALA –
- UGA –

Top rushers

- ALA –
- UGA –

Top Receiving

- ALA –
- UGA –

The No. 13/13 Alabama Crimson Tide put together a dominating performance on the road to beat No. 8/6 Georgia (4–1, 2–1) 38–10 Saturday afternoon at Sanford Stadium in Athens, Ga.

In a game played mostly in a steady rain, senior quarterback Jake Coker and the Alabama offense were efficient while the defense had both Bulldogs quarterbacks under duress all game long. Coker had a rushing and passing touchdown, junior running back Derrick Henry added another touchdown on the ground, and the Tide scored on a 50-yard interception return by junior defensive back Eddie Jackson and on a blocked punt by freshman defensive back Minkah Fitzpatrick.

Freshman receiver Calvin Ridley caught five passes for 120 yards, his first game over the century mark, and one touchdown while Henry set a new career-high in attempts (26) and rushing yards (148). The Alabama defense was a disruptive force in the wet conditions all day, forcing a total of four turnovers, including three interceptions by three different members of the secondary. Georgia's two quarterbacks completed only 11 of 31 pass attempts and averaged 3.2 yards per pass. The Tide gained 379 yards of offense (190 passing and 189 rushing) and converted 15 first downs. The Bulldogs picked up 299 yards for the game (106 passing and 193 rushing) along with converting 12 first downs.

Alabama: 4–1, 1–1 SEC

=== vs Arkansas Razorbacks ===
Arkansas Razorbacks at #8 Alabama Crimson Tide – Game summary

Quarter	1	2	3	4	Total
Arkansas	0	7	0	7	14
#8 Alabama	3	0	7	17	27

at Bryant–Denny Stadium • Tuscaloosa, AL

- Date: October 10, 2015
- Game time: 6:05 p.m.
- Game weather: 64, Overcast, Wind NW @ 7 mph
- Game attendance: 101,821
- Referee: Ken Williamson
- TV announcers (ESPN): Brad Nessler (play-by-play), Todd Blackledge (color), Holly Rowe (sideline)
- Source

Game information

First Quarter

- (7:09) ALA FG: Adam Griffith 24-yard field goal.

Second Quarter

- (1:29) ARK TD: Brandon Allen 4-yard pass to Drew Morgan (Cole Hedlund PAT).

Third Quarter

- (1:39) ALA TD: Jake Coker 81-yard pass to Calvin Ridley (Adam Griffith PAT).

Fourth Quarter

- (12:49) ALA TD: Jake Coker 3-yard pass to Richard Mullaney (Adam Griffith PAT).
- (10:07) ALA FG: Adam Griffith 35-yard field goal.
- (2:44) ALA TD: Derrick Henry 1-yard rush (Adam Griffith PAT).
- (1:37) ARK TD: Brandon Allen 54-yard pass to Dominique Reed (Cole Hedlund PAT).

Top Passers

- ARK – Brandon Allen: 15/32, 176 yds, 2 TD, 1 INT
- ALA – Jake Coker: 24/33, 262 yds, 2 TD, 2 INT

Top Rushers

- ARK – Alex Collins: 12 att, 26 yds
- ALA – Derrick Henry: 27 att, 95 yds, 1 TD

Top Receiving

- ARK – Dominique Reed: 3 rec, 77 yds, 1 TD
- ALA – Calvin Ridley: 9 rec, 140 yds, 1 TD

The University of Alabama Crimson Tide football team (5–1 overall; 2–1 in the Southeastern Conference) turned in a gritty performance on Saturday night to defeat the Arkansas Razorbacks (2–4 overall; 1–2 SEC), 27–14, in the 2015 Homecoming game before a capacity crowd of 101,821 at Bryant–Denny Stadium on the Alabama campus. Alabama erased a 7–3 deficit late in the third quarter on an 81-yard pass from quarterback Jake Coker to wide receiver Calvin Ridley, a play that ignited an offense that had struggled to finish drives most of the game to that point. That score, with 1:39 left in the third period, turned the game in Alabama's favor as the Crimson Tide stopped an Arkansas drive at the Hogs' 43 on the ensuing possession and marched to a touchdown on a 3-yard pass from Coker to wideout Richard Mullaney for a 17–7 lead. After an Eddie Jackson interception for the Tide a few plays later, Alabama tacked on a 35-yard Adam Griffith field goal for a 20–7 edge with 10:07 left in the fourth quarter. Derrick Henry added a 1-yard touchdown run with 2:44 left, marking the 11th consecutive game in which he has scored on the ground, to give the Tide the final 27–7 victory margin.

Arkansas' first touchdown came in the second quarter on a four-yard pass by quarterback Brandon Allen to wide receiver Drew Morgan after the Hogs took possession at the Tide 12 following an interception. Arkansas added a late 54-yard touchdown pass by Allen to wide receiver Dominique Reed with 1:37 left in the game.

Led by linebacker Reggie Ragland's eight tackles (seven solos), Alabama's defensive was unyielding, allowing only 220 total yards to the Razorbacks (176 passing, 44 rushing) while allowing just 1.8 yards per rush. Ragland also had one quarterback sack, broke up a pass, had two quarterback hurries and forced a fumble.

The Tide offense gained 396 total yards, including 134 on the ground against one of the nation's top rushing defenses. Coker completed 24 of 33 passes for 262 yards and two touchdowns with two interceptions. Ridley caught nine passes for 140 yards and a touchdown. Henry rushed for 95 yards and a touchdown on 27 carries.

Alabama punter JK Scott averaged 50.0 yards per punt on four attempts, placing two inside the Arkansas 20-yard line.

Alabama: 5–1, 2–1 SEC

=== @ #9 Texas A&M Aggies ===
#10 Alabama Crimson Tide at #9 Texas A&M Aggies – Game summary

Quarter	1	2	3	4	Total
#10 Alabama	14	14	3	10	41
#9 Texas A&M	3	10	7	3	23

at Kyle Field • College Station, TX

- Date: October 17, 2015
- Game time: 2:39 p.m.
- Game weather: 82 degrees, Clear Skies, Wind 1 mph
- Game attendance: 105,733
- Referee: Matt Austin
- TV announcers (CBS): Verne Lundquist (play-by-play), Gary Danielson (color), Allie LaForce (sideline)

Game information

First quarter

- ALA – Minkah Fitzpatrick 33 Yd Interception Return (Adam Griffith Kick), 7:53 (ALA 7–0)
- ALA – Derrick Henry 55 Yd Run (Adam Griffith Kick), 5:26 (ALA 14–0)
- TAMU – Taylor Bertolet 54 Yd Field Goal, 1:14 (ALA 14–3)

Second quarter

- ALA – Derrick Henry 6 Yd Run (Adam Griffith Kick), 14:51 (ALA 21–3)
- TAMU – Taylor Bertolet 52 Yd Field Goal, 11:59 (ALA 21–6)
- ALA – Eddie Jackson 93 Yd Interception Return (Adam Griffith Kick), 6:28 (ALA 28–6)
- TAMU – Christian Kirk 68 Yd Punt Return (Taylor Bertolet Kick), 3:03 (ALA 28–13)

Third quarter

- TAMU – Ricky Seals-Jones 3 Yd pass from Kyle Allen (Taylor Bertolet Kick), 10:51 (ALA 28–20)
- ALA – Adam Griffith 32 Yd Field Goal, 3:04 (ALA 31–20)

Fourth quarter

- ALA – Adam Griffith 20 Yd Field Goal, 11:17 (ALA 34–20)
- TAMU – Taylor Bertolet 36 Yd Field Goal, 7:57 (ALA 34–23)
- ALA – Minkah Fitzpatrick 55 Yd Interception Return (Adam Griffith Kick), 5:18 (ALA 41–23)

Top passers

- ALA – Jake Coker 19–25, 138 YDS
- TA&M – Kyle Allen 20–40, 263 YDS, 1 TD, 3 INT

Top rushers

- ALA – Derrick Henry 32 CAR, 236 YDS, 2 TD
- TA&M – Tra Carson 13 CAR, 46 YDS

Top Receiving

- ALA – Calvin Ridley 7 REC, 52 YDS
- TA&M – Ricky Seals-Jones 6 REC, 107 YDS, 1 TD

The 10th-ranked University of Alabama football team used a punishing rushing offense and big plays from its defense to defeat No. 9- Texas A&M, 41–23, on Saturday before a crowd of 105,733 at Kyle Field. Alabama (6–1 overall; 3–1 in the Southeastern Conference) intercepted four passes, returning three for touchdowns, to knock off the previously unbeaten Aggies (5–1 overall; 2–1 in the SEC).

Crimson Tide running back Derrick Henry rushed for 236 yards and two touchdowns while cornerback Minkah Fitzpatrick and strong safety Eddie Jackson nabbed two interceptions each. Jackson returned one for a 93-yard touchdown as the Tide defense scored three times – a first in Alabama history. Fitzpatrick scored two touchdowns via interception returns, first on a 33-yard return in the first quarter and later on a game-clinching 55-yarder. Alabama quarterback Jake Coker passed for 138 yards while completing 19-of-25 passes.

Alabama built a 28–6 lead midway through the second quarter with Henry rushing 15 times for 178 yards and three scores in the first half and the Tide defense holding the explosive A&M offense to 189 total yards. After Fitzpatrick's interception return, Henry rumbled 55 yards to pay dirt with 5:26 left in the opening stanza before tacking on a 6-yard scoring run with 14:51 left in the half. Jackson's 93-yard scoring play extended the lead to 28–6 before A&M struck back on a 68-yard punt return touchdown by Christian Kirk with 3:03 left in the first half. Alabama led, 28–13, at halftime.

A&M narrowed the Alabama lead to 28–20 early in the third period on a 3-yard pass from quarterback Kyle Allen to wide receiver Ricky Seals-Jones. The Tide extended its lead to 34–20 on a pair of Adam Griffith field goals before A&M's Taylor Bertolet hit a 36-yard field goal with 7:57 left in the fourth quarter, Bertolet's third counter of the game. Fitzpatrick stopped an Aggie drive with his second interception of the day, which he returned 55 yards for his second score of the game. It set a Crimson Tide single-game record for interceptions return for a touchdown, both for the team and an individual.

Alabama: 6–1, 3–1 SEC

=== vs Tennessee Volunteers ===
Tennessee Volunteers at #8 Alabama Crimson Tide – Game summary

Quarter	1	2	3	4	Total
Tennessee	7	0	0	7	14
#8 Alabama	7	0	3	9	19

at Bryant–Denny Stadium • Tuscaloosa, AL

- Date: October 24, 2015
- Game time: 2:40 p.m.
- Game weather: 82, Partly Cloudy, Wind SE @ 11 mph
- Game attendance: 101,821
- Referee: John McDaid
- TV announcers (CBS): Verne Lundquist (play-by-play), Gary Danielson (color), Allie LaForce (sideline)

Game information

First quarter

Second quarter

Third quarter

Fourth quarter

Top passers

- UT –
- ALA –

Top rushers

- UT –
- ALA –

Top Receiving

- UT –
- ALA –

After Tennessee tailback Jalen Hurd ran 12 yards for a touchdown with 5:49 left, the Tide offense responded with a decisive 71-yard march to the end zone. Tide quarterback Jake Coker completed key passes of 29 yards to wide receiver ArDarius Stewart and 15 yards to wide receiver Calvin Ridley on the drive that was punctuated by running back Derrick Henry's tough running. Henry carried five times for 35 yards on the winning drive, including the game-winning 14-yard touchdown run with 2:24 left.

Henry rushed for 143 yards and two touchdowns, Stewart had six catches for 114 yards, and Coker passed for 247 yards while completing 21-of-27 passes. Linebacker Reggie Ragland led the Tide defense with a game-high 12 tackles (eight solos), including a tackle for loss and punter J.K. Scott averaged 49.8 yards on four punts, including a 56-yarder.

Alabama broke on top early on a 20-yard touchdown run by Henry with 7:14 left in the first quarter. The score marked the 13th consecutive game in which Henry has scored a rushing touchdown. Tennessee struck back to tie it at 7–7 on an 11-yard pass from quarterback Joshua Dobbs to wide receiver Josh Smith with 3:00 left in the opening period.

Tied at halftime, 7–7, Alabama broke on top on the first possession of the second half by driving 73 yards in 12 plays to a 19-yard field goal by Adam Griffith for a 10–7 lead with 9:00 left in the third period.

Three Tennessee scoring opportunities ended in missed field goals, a 43-yarder in the first quarter on the game's first series, a 51-yarder on the final play of the first half, and another 51-yarder with 14:06 left in the fourth period. The first would have given the Vols a 3–0 lead, the second would have given UT a 10–7 halftime lead, and the third would have tied the game at 10–10 early in the fourth quarter.

Taking the ball at the Tide 33 with 14:06 left in the fourth period, Alabama moved 56 yards in 12 plays while eating 6:58 of game time. A key sequence on the drive began with a third-and-11 play at the UT 46 with 10:19 left. Coker completed a 15-yard pass to Stewart for a first down at the UT 31. After a 10-yard penalty created a first-and-20 at the UT 41, a pass to receiver Calvin Ridley gained 26 yards to the UT 15. Ridley adjusted back to the pass after being covered on the play, grabbing the ball at the sideline and gaining several more yards after the catch. Henry gained five yards on a rush at right tackle to the Vol 10 on first down, then was dropped for a loss of a yard on second down. On third-and-six at the UT 11, Coker's fade pass to receiver Richard Mullaney was incomplete in the end zone. That set up a 28-yard field goal attempt by Griffith with 7:13 on the clock. Griffith kicked it true to give the Tide a 13–7 lead with 7:08 left in the fourth period.

Tennessee stormed back with authority to take a 14–13 lead, blazing 75 yards in four plays to take the lead on a 12-yard run by tailback Jalen Hurd with 5:49 on the clock. Dobbs connected with Smith for 27 yards on a crossing patter to start the drive, reaching the Tide 48. Two plays later, Dobbs hit a slant pass to receiver Josh Malone for 34 yards to the Tide 12. Hurd raced around left end into the end zone on the next play.

Alabama responded on the ensuing possession. Facing 2nd and 11 at the Tide 27, Coker completed a 27-yard pass to Stewart at the UT 44 with 4:29 left. Stewart made an acrobatic catch despite tight coverage. Henry gained two yards at left guard to the UT 42 on first down, then carried for two more to Vols 40. Facing third-and-six at the 40, Coker lobbed a pass to Ridley at the left sideline and Ridley made a leaping catch over a Tennessee defender for a 15-yard gain to the Tennessee 25. Henry gained six yards at right guard on first down to the UT 19. Tennessee called its first timeout with 3:02 left. On second-and four, Henry muscled up the middle for five yards to a first down at the UT 14. With the clock running under 2:30, Henry took a handoff at left end and ran behind good blocking for 14 yards and a touchdown with 2:24 left. Leading by five points, Alabama went for a two-point conversion. A pass to Ridley was incomplete, broken up by Tennessee cornerback Justin Martin, and the Tide held a 19–14 lead with 2:24 left.

Tennessee took possession at its 25 following a touchback on the kickoff. On the third play of the possession, Alabama defensive end Jonathan Allen sacked Dobbs for a nine-yard loss at the UT 26. Facing a second-and-24 at the UT 21 following a false start penalty, Dobbs was sacked by Tide linebacker Ryan Anderson for a loss of 10 at the UT 11. Dobbs fumbled on the play and Alabama's A'Shawn Robinson recovered at the UT 13. Robinson returned the fumble nine yards to the UT 4 with 1:18 left. Coker took a knee on three consecutive snaps to end the game.

Alabama: 7–1, 4–1 SEC

=== vs #2 LSU Tigers ===
#2 LSU Tigers at #4 Alabama Crimson Tide – Game summary

Quarter	1	2	3	4	Total
#2 LSU	0	10	0	6	16
#4 Alabama	0	13	14	3	30

at Bryant–Denny Stadium • Tuscaloosa, AL

- Date: November 7, 2015
- Game time: 7:10 p.m.
- Game weather: 57, Rain, Winds at 3 mph
- Game attendance: 101,821
- Referee: Hubert Owens
- TV announcers (CBS): Verne Lundquist (play-by-play), Gary Danielson (color), Allie LaForce (sideline)

Game information

Second quarter

- ALA – Adam Griffith 22 Yd Field Goal, 11:08 (ALA 3–0)
- ALA – Derrick Henry 2 Yd Run (Adam Griffith Kick), 8:51 (ALA 10–0)
- LSU – Travin Dural 40 Yd pass from Brandon Harris(Trent Domingue Kick), 6:12 (ALA 10–7)
- LSU – Trent Domingue 39 Yd Field Goal, (10–10)
- ALA – Adam Griffith 55 Yd Field Goal, 0:14 (ALA 13–10)

Third quarter

- ALA – Derrick Henry 1 Yd Run (Adam Griffith Kick), 13:00 (ALA 20–10)
- ALA – Derrick Henry 7 Yd Run (Adam Griffith Kick), 2:47 (ALA 27–10)

Fourth quarter

- ALA – Adam Griffith 30 Yd Field Goal, 12:45 (ALA 30–10)
- LSU – Leonard Fournette 1 Yd Run (Trent Domingue PAT blocked), 9:18 (ALA 30–16)

Top passers

- LSU – Brandon Harris 6–19, 128 YDS, 1 TD, 1 INT
- ALA – Jake Coker 18–24, 184 YDS

Top rushers

- LSU – Leonard Fournette 19 CAR, 31 YDS, 1 TD
- ALA – Derrick Henry 38 CAR, 210 YDS, 3 TD

Top Receiving

- LSU – Travin Dural 2 REC, 77 YDS, 1 TD
- ALA – Calvin Ridley 7 REC, 51 YDS

The University of Alabama defense limited Louisiana State University running back Leonard Fournette to 31 rushing yards while the Crimson Tide offense rode a 210-yard, three-touchdown rushing performance by running back Derrick Henry to a 30–16 victory before a capacity crowd of 101,821 on Saturday night at Bryant–Denny Stadium. The victory moved No. 4 Alabama (9–1 overall; 5–1 in the Southeastern Conference) into a tie with No. 2 LSU (7–2 overall; 4–1 in the SEC) for the lead in the SEC's West Division.

Fournette, who entered the game as the nation's leading rusher averaging 193.1 yards rushing per game, could not get going against the Crimson Tide defense. But Henry rushed for touchdowns of two yards, one yard and seven yards while carrying the ball 38 times, the third-most carries by one player in a single game in Alabama football history. Fournette had an 18-yard run at the 11:00 mark of the fourth quarter after a Henry fumble set up the Tigers at the Tide 22. But by that time, the Tide had built a 30–10 lead and the outcome was decided.

Alabama was dominant early, breaking out to a 10–0 lead in the second quarter on a 22-yard Adam Griffith field goal and Henry's two-yard scoring rush that came after a 40-yard run in which he fended off three would-be tacklers while rumbling deep into LSU territory. But the Tigers struck back to tie it at 10–10 with an explosive passing game. Quarterback Brandon Harris hit wide receiver Travin Dural for a 40-yard touchdown pass and Trent Domingue followed with a 39-yard field goal to tie it. But Alabama took a 13–10 lead at halftime on a career-long 55-yard field goal by Griffith with 14 seconds left in the half.

After Tide linebacker Dillon Lee intercepted a Harris pass on the first play of the third quarter to set Alabama up at the LSU 28, Henry capped a touchdown drive with a 1-yard run to stake the Tide to a 20–10 lead with 13:00 left in the period. Henry extended the lead with a seven-yard scoring run with 2:47 left in the third quarter and Griffith added a 29-yard field goal with 12:45 left in the fourth period for a 30–10 Alabama lead.

LSU showed life late after Henry lost a fumble at the Tide 22. The Tigers marched 22 yards in four plays with Fournette scoring on a one-yard run with 9:18 on the clock. The extra-point was blocked by the Tide's A'Shawn Robinson as the Tide held a 30–16 lead.

The Alabama defense created seven plays of negative yardage by the LSU offense in the game, including seven tackles for loss and two quarterback sacks. LSU was limited to 182 total yards in the game (54 rushing, 128 passing). The Alabama offense gained 434 total yards, including 250 rushing, and had the ball for 39:27 of game time. Tide safety Geno Matias-Smith led the Tide defense with six tackles. Alabama punter JK Scott averaged 45.0 yards on three punts with a long of 50 yards, including one punt downed inside the LSU 20. Griffith made all three field goal attempts, running his streak of successful attempts to seven straight.

Alabama: 8–1, 5–1 SEC

=== @ #17 Mississippi State Bulldogs ===
#2 Alabama Crimson Tide at #17 Mississippi State Bulldogs – Game summary

Quarter	1	2	3	4	Total
#2 Alabama	0	21	3	7	31
#17 Mississippi State	0	3	3	0	6

at Davis Wade Stadium • Starkville, MS

- Date: November 14, 2015
- Game time: 2:39 p.m.
- Game weather: 65, partly cloudy, winds @ 4 mph
- Game attendance: 62,435
- Referee: Ken Williamson
- TV announcers (CBS): Verne Lundquist (play-by-play), Gary Danielson (color), Allie LaForce (sideline)

Game information

Second quarter

- ALA – Cyrus Jones 69 Yd Punt Return (Adam Griffith Kick), 10:44 (ALA 7–0)
- ALA – Calvin Ridley 60 Yd pass from Jake Coker (Adam Griffith Kick), 8:36 (ALA 14–0)
- MSU – Westin Graves 31 Yd Field Goal, 6:10 (ALA 14–3)
- ALA – Derrick Henry 74 Yd Run (Adam Griffith Kick), 5:10 (ALA 21–3)

Third quarter

- ALA – Adam Griffith 42 Yd Field Goal, 10:43 (ALA 24–3)
- MSU – Westin Graves 39 Yd Field Goal, 1:24 (ALA 24–6)

Fourth quarter

- ALA – Derrick Henry 65 Yd Run (Adam Griffith Kick), 7:53 (ALA 31–6)

Top passers

- ALA – Jake Coker 15–25, 144 YDS, 1 TD, 1 INT
- MSU – Dak Prescott 22–43, 300 YDS, 1 INT

Top rushers

- ALA – Derrick Henry 22 CAR, 204 YDS, 2 TD
- MSU – Brandon Holloway 7 CAR, 34 YDS

Top Receiving

- ALA – Calvin Ridley 5 REC, 76 YDS, 1 TD
- MSU – Fred Ross 8 REC, 114 YDS

The University of Alabama defense sacked Mississippi State (7–3 overall; 3–3 in the SEC) quarterback Dak Prescott nine times and Crimson Tide running back Derrick Henry rushed for 204 yards and two touchdowns in a 31–6 victory over the Bulldogs before an overflow crowd of 62,435 at Davis Wade Stadium at Scott Field on Saturday.

Alabama's defense produced 12 plays for losses against a high-powered State offense, limiting the explosive Prescott to 14 rushing yards on 26 attempts and holding the Bulldogs out of the end zone for the first time in 36 games dating back to MSU's 2013 season opener. It also marked the end of a 32-game streak by Prescott in which he had scored a touchdown in a game, the longest streak in the Football Bowl Subdivision. The nine quarterback sacks by the Tide defense is the most by an Alabama defense since 1998 when it also tallied nine against Vanderbilt.

Henry scored on runs of 75 and 65 yards as the Crimson Tide offense overcame a slow start with a methodical ground game while the Tide defense held off several State scoring threats. Henry turned in over 200 yards rushing in a game for the third time in 2015, becoming the second Alabama back to do that three times in a single season, following Bobby Humphrey who rushed for 200+ yards in three games during the 1986 season.

Tide linebacker Reuben Foster led Alabama with 10 tackles (six solo). Defensive end Jonathan Allen had three quarterback sacks among his seven tackles. Defensive end A'Shawn Robinson had 2.5 sacks among his five tackles, linebacker Ryan Anderson had two sacks among his five tackles and linebacker Tim Williams added two sacks in his five stops. Nose guard Daron Payne had 1.5 sacks in his three stops while linebacker Denzel Devall had one sack on his only tackle of the day. Alabama racked up 12 tackles for losses totaling 58 yards, forced three fumbles (recovering one), broke up seven passes and had four quarterback hurries on the day.

Alabama broke on top, 7–0, early in the second quarter on a 69-yard punt return by Cyrus Jones. On Alabama's next possession, wide receiver Calvin Ridley took a pass from Coker at the Tide 49 in the middle of the field, cut back and juked a defender, then raced to the end zone to complete a 60-yard scoring play, extending the Tide lead to 14–0. State responded on the next possession with a 31-yard field goal by Westin Graves that narrowed the lead to 14–3 before Henry raced 74 yards for a touchdown to give the Tide a 21–3 lead at the half.

A 42-yard field goal by Adam Griffith gave Alabama a 24–3 lead early in the third quarter. State added a 39-yard field goal by Graves late in the third quarter before Henry sealed the verdict with a 65-yard touchdown run with 7:53 left in the game.

Alabama: 9–1, 6–1 SEC

=== vs Charleston Southern Buccaneers ===
Charleston Southern Buccaneers at #2 Alabama Crimson Tide – Game summary

Quarter	1	2	3	4	Total
Charleston Southern	0	0	0	6	6
#2 Alabama	28	21	0	7	56

at Bryant–Denny Stadium • Tuscaloosa, AL

- Date: November 21, 2015
- Game time: 3:02 p.m.
- Game weather: 66, Partly Cloudy, Wind WSW @ 4 mph
- Game attendance: 100,611
- Referee: Brad Rogers
- TV announcers (SEC Network): Dave Neal (play-by-play), Matt Stinchcomb (color), Kayce Smith (sideline)

Game information

First quarter

- ALA – Derrick Henry 17 Yd Run (Adam Griffith Kick), 11:36 (ALA 7–0)
- ALA – Derrick Henry 2 Yd Run (Adam Griffith Kick), 5:50 (ALA 14–0)
- ALA – Richard Mullaney 21 Yd pass from Jake Coker (Adam Griffith Kick), 2:28 (ALA 21–0)
- ALA – Cyrus Jones 43 Yd Punt Return (Adam Griffith Kick), 0:00 (ALA 28–0)

Second quarter

- ALA – Calvin Ridley 30 Yd pass from Jake Coker (Adam Griffith Kick), 7:07 (ALA 35–0)
- ALA – Cyrus Jones 72 Yd Punt Return (Adam Griffith Kick), 4:03 (ALA 42–0)
- ALA – Bo Scarbrough 1 Yd Run (Adam Griffith Kick), 1:53 (ALA 49–0)

Fourth quarter

- CSU – Kyle Copeland 3 Yd Run (Two-Point Pass Conversion Failed), 12:38 (ALA 49–6)
- ALA – Damien Harris 6 Yd Run (JK Scott Kick), 5:52 (ALA 56–6)

Top passers

- CSU – Kyle Copeland 3–7, 46 YDS, 1 INT
- ALA – Jake Coker 11–13, 155 YDS, 2 TD

Top rushers

- CSU – Kelan Fraise 7 CAR, 39 YDS
- ALA – Bo Scarbrough 10 CAR, 69 YDS, 1 TD

Top Receiving

- CSU – Saire Davis 1 REC, 35 YDS
- ALA – Calvin Ridley 4 REC, 49 YDS, 1 TD

The second-ranked University of Alabama Crimson Tide in a 56–6 victory before a crowd of 100,611 at Bryant–Denny Stadium Saturday. Alabama raced to a 28–0 lead after the first quarter on the way to a 49–0 halftime advantage, scoring touchdowns on its first five offensive possessions and adding scores on a pair of punt returns.

Playing only the first quarter of Saturday's game, Alabama running back Derrick Henry rushed for 68 yards and two touchdowns on only nine carries. He also caught a pass for 28 yards. Henry's two rushing touchdowns opened the scoring and Cyrus Jones' punt returns highlighted the opening half onslaught as the Tide prepared for its annual Iron Bowl clash with Auburn by dispatching the Buccaneers quickly. The Alabama defense was dominant throughout, allowing only 31 total yards and three first downs in the opening half.

Due to the big lead, Alabama's starters sat out the second half. In two quarters of play, quarterback Jake Coker completed 11 of 13 pass attempts for 155 yards and two touchdowns without throwing an interception. Wide receiver Calvin Ridley had four catches for 49 yards, wide receiver ArDarius Stewart had four catches for 45 yards and wideout Richard Mullaney had one catch for a 21-yard touchdown. The offensive starters yielded to the Tide's second-team offense late in the second period. Reserve running back Bo Scarborough had a game-high 69 rushing yards and a touchdown on 10 carries.

The Alabama defense limited CSU to 134 total yards (85 rushing, 49 passing) and eight first downs in the game, holding the Buccaneers to 1-of-10 on third downs while causing two turnovers (one fumble and one interception). Cornerback Bradley Sylve and defensive end Dalvin Tomlinson both had four tackles each to lead the Tide.

Henry started the scoring with a 17-yard touchdown run with 11:36 left in the first quarter, capping the game's first possession. It was Henry's 16th consecutive game with a touchdown. Henry ended the Tide's next possession with a 2-yard scoring run to give Alabama a 14–0 lead with 5:50 left in the opening period. That gave him 21 rushing touchdowns in 2015, tying the school record set by Trent Richardson in 2011, and also gave Henry 35 career rushing scores to tie Richardson for fourth on the Tide's career rushing touchdowns list. After the Tide forced another CSU punt, Alabama capped its third possession with its third touchdown of the game, this one a 21-yard pass from Coker to wide receiver Richard Mullaney with 2:28 left in the opening quarter. Cyrus Jones closed the quarter with a 43-yard punt return for a touchdown on the final play of the period for a 28–0 Alabama lead, marking the second consecutive game in which Jones has taken a punt the distance.

A 30-yard pass from Coker to wide receiver Calvin Ridley gave the Tide a 35–0 lead at 7:07 of the second quarter, capping an 86-yard drive and giving Alabama four touchdowns in four offensive possessions. Three minutes later, following CSU's next possession, Jones took another punt for a touchdown, this one going 72 yards for a 42–0 lead. It marked the first time in Crimson Tide history that an Alabama player has returned two punts for touchdowns in the same game. Alabama led, 49–0, at the half via Bo Scarborough's one-yard run with 1:53 left in the half. The 49 points scored by the Tide was the most in a half by an Alabama team since scoring 52 points against Vanderbilt 1990. CSU quarterback Kyle Copeland's three-yard run early in the fourth quarter prevented a shutout. Alabama running back Damien Harris scored on a six-yard run in the fourth period to end the Tide's scoring.

Alabama: 10–1, 6–1 SEC

=== @ Auburn Tigers ===
#2 Alabama Crimson Tide at Auburn Tigers – Game summary

Quarter	1	2	3	4	Total
#2 Alabama	3	9	7	10	29
Auburn	6	0	7	0	13

at Jordan–Hare Stadium • Auburn, AL

- Date: November 28, 2015
- Game time: 2:39 p.m.
- Game weather: 73 degrees, winds @ 5 mph
- Game attendance: 87,451
- Referee: Tom Ritter
- TV announcers (CBS): Verne Lundquist (play-by-play), Gary Danielson (color), Allie LaForce (sideline)

Game information

First quarter

- ALA – Adam Griffith 26 yd field goal, 11:28 (ALA 3–0)
- AUB – Daniel Carlson 24 yd field goal, 7:35 (3–3)
- AUB – Daniel Carlson 44 yd field goal, 1:49, (AUB 6–3)

Second quarter

- ALA – Adam Griffith 40 yd field goal, 11:49, (6–6)
- ALA – Adam Griffith 26 yd field goal, 6:58 (ALA 9–6)
- ALA – Adam Griffith 50 yd field goal, 0:24 (ALA 12–6)

Third quarter

- ALA – ArDarius Stewart 34 yd pass from Jake Coker (Adam Griffith Kick), 5:14 (ALA 19–6)
- AUB – Jason Smith 77 yd pass from Jeremy Johnson (Daniel Carlson kick) 4:27 (ALA 19–13)

Fourth quarter

- ALA – Adam Griffith 47 Yd Field Goal, 10:04 (ALA 22–13)
- ALA – Derrick Henry 25 Yd Run (Adam Griffith Kick), 0:26 (ALA 29–13)

Top passers

- ALA – Jake Coker 17–26, 179 YDS, 1 TD
- AUB – Jeremy Johnson 10–23, 169 YDS, 1 TD

Top rushers

- ALA – Derrick Henry 46 CAR, 271 YDS, 1 TD
- AUB – Jovon Robinson 14 CAR, 51 YDS

Top Receiving

- ALA – Calvin Ridley 6 REC, 90 YDS
- AUB – Jason Smith 2 REC, 82 YDS, 1 TD

University of Alabama running back Derrick Henry rushed for 271 yards and a touchdown on a school-record 46 carries to lead the Crimson Tide (11–1 overall; 7–1 in the Southeastern Conference) to a 29–13 over the Auburn Tigers (6–6 overall; 2–6 in the SEC) Saturday afternoon before a capacity crowd of 87,451 at Jordan-Hare Stadium. The victory gave the Crimson Tide the SEC's Western Division title and earned Alabama a berth in the SEC Championship Game against the Florida Gators next Saturday, December 5, in Atlanta's Georgia Dome.

With the game on the line in the final quarter, Henry rushed 19 times for 114 yards in the fourth quarter alone to lead the Tide out of a tense situation in which they were clinging to a 19–13 lead midway through the period. After Alabama took a 22–13 lead on Adam Griffith's fifth field goal of the game with 10:04 left, Henry carried on every Crimson Tide snap the rest of the way, carrying the ball on 14 consecutive plays to close out the game. Henry's totals stand as the third-most rushing yards in a game by any Alabama back, and his yardage is the most ever gained by an Auburn opponent.

In addition to Henry's heroics, Alabama's offense was keyed by an accurate passing performance by quarterback Jake Coker, who completed 17 of 26 attempts for 179 yards and a touchdown. Wide receiver ArDarius Stewart caught a game-high eight catches for 81 yards and a score while wideout Calvin Ridley had 90 yards receiving on six catches. Griffith made good on all five field goal attempts in the game, the most by a Tide kicker in four seasons. The Alabama defense permitted only one big play in the game while limiting the explosive Tigers offense to 260 total yards (169 passing, 91 rushing).

Alabama outgained Auburn, 465 to 260, while the Tide rushed for 286 yards and passed for 179. The Tide notched 24 first downs to Auburn's 12, limited the Tigers to 3-of-15 on third downs, and had the ball for 35 minutes, 23 seconds, compared to Auburn's 24:37. Safety Geno Matias-Smith led the Tide with eight tackles and a forced fumble. Linebacker Reuben Foster had six stops, a pass breakup and a quarterback hurry, while Tide cornerback Marlon Humphrey had six tackles on the night. Linebacker Reggie Ragland had five stops while directing the Tide defense on the field.

Alabama broke on top early with a field goal to cap its first offensive possession of the game. The Tide marched 48 yards in eight plays to the Auburn 9 where Adam Griffith entered to kick a 26-yard field goal, giving Alabama a 3–0 lead with 11:28 on the clock. Henry carried four times for 36 yards on the march, keying the drive with a 30-yard run to the Auburn 14. Stewart caught three passes for 12 yards on the opening drive. Auburn struck right back, moving 68 yards in nine plays to a 24-yard field goal by Daniel Carlson that tied the game at 3–3 with 7:35 on the clock. Auburn took the lead on its next series, a seven-play, 22-yard drive that stalled at the Tide 27. From there, Carlson entered to kick a 44-yard field goal that gave Auburn a 6–3 lead with 1:49 on the clock. The Tide came right back with a field goal to tie it, this one a 41-yarder by Griffith with 11:47 left to knot the score at 6–6. Henry carried seven times for 51 yards on the 14-play drive that covered 67 yards.

The Tide moved 55 yards in 5 plays to take the lead early in the second quarter, highlighted by a 46-yard pass from Coker to Ridley, who made an outstanding catch in double coverage at the Tiger 5. Alabama settled for a third field goal, this one a 26-yarder by Griffith, for a 9–6 lead with 6:58 left in the half. After an Auburn drive ended in a missed 48-yard field goal with 1:24 left, Alabama moved quickly. ArDarius Stewart made a spectacular leaping catch for a 17-yard gain on the first play, then Henry took a handoff around right tackle for 15 yards to the Auburn 36. After Henry gained three on a rush up the middle, two incompletions forced a 50-yard field goal try by Griffith. Griffith nailed it for his fourth of the half to give the Tide a 12–6 lead with 24 seconds left.

Alabama lengthened its lead late in the third period, moving 85 yards in nine plays to a touchdown on an impressive 34-yard pass from Coker to Stewart with 5:14 on the clock. Under a heavy rush, Coker left the pocket and evaded two rushers before firing a dart on the run to Stewart in the end zone. Griffith's kick gave Alabama a 19–6 lead with 5:14 left in the third quarter. But Auburn retaliated quickly, as quarterback Jeremy Johnson hit wide receiver Jason Smith on a 77-yard touchdown pass on a third and long play in which Smith bobbled the ball twice into the air before hauling it in and racing untouched to the end zone. With the point-after kick by Carlson, Alabama's lead was trimmed to 19–13 with 4:27 left in the third period.

On a first down at the Tide 35, Coker was flushed from the pocket and rushed to the sidelines for a one-yard gain. A 15-yard personal foul was called on Auburn safety Johnathan Ford for a late hit on Coker as he exited the field. Another 15-yard penalty was assessed to Auburn for unsportsmanlike conduct after that play, moving the ball to the Auburn 34. Three plays later, Griffith kicked a 47-yard field goal to give the Tide a 22–13 lead with 10:04 left in the fourth period. This drive is infamous for the commentary by the Auburn radio announcers, who showed extreme bias in complaining about the officiating, and attacking Coach Nick Saban in their deflection of Auburn's sideline penalty.

After forcing an Auburn punt, Alabama took over possession with 7:49 left at its own 18. Henry and the Tide offensive line took over from there, beginning with a 16-yard gain on the first play and giving the ball to Henry 14 consecutive times. The first 10 of those plays ended when Henry was stopped on a fourth-and-one play at the Auburn 31 with 2:46 left. After Auburn was stuffed on the next possession, Alabama took over again at the Tiger 34. Henry carried the next four plays, closing it out with a 25-yard burst around right end for the clinching touchdown with 26 seconds left in the game.

Alabama: 11–1, 7–1 SEC

=== Vs. #18 Florida Gators ===
#18 Florida Gators vs #2 Alabama Crimson Tide – Game summary

Quarter	1	2	3	4	Total
#18 Florida	0	7	0	8	15
#2 Alabama	2	10	10	7	29

at Georgia Dome • Atlanta, GA

- Date: December 5, 2015
- Game time: 4:10 p.m.
- Game weather: Played indoors (dome stadium)
- Game attendance: 75,320
- Referee: Matt Austin
- TV announcers (CBS): Verne Lundquist (play-by-play), Gary Danielson (color), Allie LaForce (sideline)

The Alabama Crimson Tide (12–1 overall) used a dominant performance by its defense and a record-setting day by running back Derrick Henry to defeat the Florida Gators (10–3 overall), 29–15, to win the 2015 Southeastern Conference Championship Game in front of a crowd of 75,320 at the Georgia Dome (capacity: 71,500). The SEC title, the 25th in Crimson Tide history, made the Tide the first team to earn back-to-back SEC Championship Game victories since Tennessee did so in 1997–98.

The Alabama defense stifled Florida's offense for much of the game, holding the Gators to 180 total yards including only 15 yards rushing. From the end of the first quarter through Florida's first possession of the fourth period (13:16 left in the game), the Alabama defense held the Gators to only three yards of total offense. During that time frame, the Tide erased an early 7–2 deficit while running off 27 unanswered points to secure the victory.

Henry rushed for 189 yards and a touchdown on 44 carries, increasing his 2015 season rushing total to 1,986 yards. He broke the SEC single-season rushing yards record previously held by Herschel Walker of Georgia (1,891 yards in 1981) on a second-and-three play on which Henry ran at right tackle and gained seven yards with 4:00 left in the third period. Henry earned Most Valuable Player honors for his performance. Tide quarterback Jake Coker completed 18 of 26 passes for 204 yards and two touchdowns without throwing an interception. Wide receiver Calvin Ridley had 103 yards on a game-high eight catches and receiver ArDarius Stewart had four catches for 64 yards.

The Crimson Tide defense registered five quarterback sacks, posted nine tackles for loss, intercepted a pass and forced a fumble. Florida's offense managed only seven first downs and had the ball for 16:31 of game time while Alabama dominated in time of possession with 43:29. Linebacker Ryan Anderson led Alabama with four tackles and three quarterback hurries while cornerback Marlon Humphrey had three stops and an interception.

Alabama opened the scoring with a safety on a blocked punt as Tide linebacker Keith Holcombe's block of Florida punter Johnny Townsend's kick bounced through the back of the end zone for a safety to give the Tide a 2–0 lead in the first quarter. Early in the second quarter, Florida took a 7–2 lead on an 85-yard punt return by Antonio Calloway, the longest in SEC Championship Game history. Moments later, Alabama responded with a 28-yard field goal by Adam Griffith, narrowing the Gator lead to 7–5. Late in the first half, a 55-yard bomb from Coker to receiver Calvin Ridley took the ball to the Gator 3, setting up a two-yard touchdown run by Henry to put the Tide in the lead, 12–7, at halftime.

Alabama extended its lead to 15–7 midway through the third period on a 30-yard field goal by Griffith. The lead moved to 22–7 later in the third on a leaping touchdown grab of a Coker pass amidst three Florida defenders by receiver ArDarius Stewart. Alabama's lead grew to 29–7 on a nine-yard pass from Coker to receiver Richard Mullaney midway in the fourth quarter. Florida's offense reached paydirt in the fourth period on a 46-yards pass from Treon Harris to receiver C.J. Worton. Harris ran for two points and the Alabama lead had narrowed to 29–15 with 5:02 on the clock. Even though Alabama was forced to punt on their next possession, their defense held by sacking Harris on a fourth down attempt.

Alabama: 12–1, 8–1 SEC

== CFP Playoff ==
=== Vs. #3 Michigan State Spartans – (Cotton Bowl Classic – CFP Semifinal) ===
#3 Michigan State Spartans vs #2 Alabama Crimson Tide – Game summary

Quarter	1	2	3	4	Total
#3 Michigan State	0	0	0	0	0
#2 Alabama	0	10	21	7	38

at AT&T Stadium • Arlington, TX

- Date: December 31, 2015
- Game time: 7:21 p.m.
- Game weather: Played indoors (retractable roof closed)
- Game attendance: 82,812
- Referee: Mike DeFee
- TV announcers (ESPN): Chris Fowler (play-by-play), Kirk Herbstreit (color), Heather Cox & Tom Rinaldi (sideline)

The Alabama Crimson Tide (13–1 overall), ranked No. 2 in the College Football Playoff (CFP) rankings, produced a dominant performance for a 38–0 victory over the No. 3 Michigan State Spartans (12–2) Thursday night in the College Football Playoff Semifinal at the Goodyear Cotton Bowl Classic in front of a crowd of 82,812 at AT&T Stadium (capacity: 71,815). With the victory, Alabama advances to the CFP National Championship Game against the No. 1 Clemson Tigers set for Monday, January 11, 2016, at University of Phoenix Stadium in Glendale, Arizona.

The Alabama defense produced another excellent performance against a quality opponent, shutting down the Spartans' offense for much of the game, holding the Spartans to only 29 rushing yards and 239 total yards. Meanwhile, Tide cornerback Cyrus Jones produced game-changing plays with an interception to stop an MSU scoring threat and a punt return for a touchdown that sealed the verdict. The Tide defense registered four quarterback sacks, posted six tackles for loss, and intercepted two passes.

Linebacker Reggie Ragland led Alabama with seven tackles while linebacker Dillon Lee had six stops and intercepted a pass. Linebacker Ryan Anderson had four tackles, including a sack and two tackles for losses. Linebacker Reuben Foster and safety Geno Matias-Smith also had four tackles in the game. Alabama limited MSU's outstanding quarterback, Connor Cook, to 186 passing yards on 17 completions in 33 attempts with 2 interceptions and no touchdowns.

Alabama's offense produced 440 total yards (286 passing, 154 rushing) led by senior quarterback Jake Coker's career-best 286 passing yards and two touchdowns. Coker was deadly accurate, completing 25 of 30 pass attempts. Freshman wide receiver Calvin Ridley had 138 receiving yards on 8 catches for 2 touchdowns, setting a new Alabama freshman record for single-season receiving yards in the process (1,031 yards). Heisman Trophy winning running back Derrick Henry rushed for 75 yards and 2 touchdowns on 20 carries, becoming only the 25th running back in NCAA history (encompassing all divisions) to rush for 2,000 yards in a season. He enters the CFP title game with 2,061 rushing yards in 2015.

After a scoreless first quarter, the teams continued in a standoff well into the second quarter until the Tide moved 80 yards in six plays to a touchdown to break on top, 7–0, on a 1-yard run by Henry with 5:36 left in the first half. Clutch plays in the passing game keyed the drive that was highlighted by a 50-yard pass from Coker to Ridley that reached the MSU 1-yard line. Henry's touchdown run was his 24th, breaking the Southeastern Conference record for rushing TDs in a season (previously held by Auburn's Tre Mason in 2013 and Florida's Tim Tebow in 2006). Placekicker Adam Griffith connected on a 47-yard field goal to give the Tide a 10–0 lead with 1:25 left in the half. Tide cornerback Cyrus Jones made a huge play at the end of the first half. The Spartans had marched to the Tide 12 in the final minute of the half before Jones leaped high to intercept a Connor Cook pass at the Tide 2-yard line in the waning seconds of the half, ending a scoring threat and protecting the Tide's 10–0 lead heading into halftime.

Alabama extended the lead to 17–0 on the opening drive of the second half, moving 75 yards in nine plays to pay dirt on a six-yard pass to Ridley along the sideline in the end zone. Later in the third period, Jones returned an MSU punt 57 yards for a touchdown to give the Tide a 24–0 lead with 3:24 left in the third period. Just 1:04 later, Coker and Ridley connected on a 50-yard touchdown bomb to move the Tide to a 31–0 lead with 2:20 left in the third period. Henry closed the scoring with an 11-yard run with 7:52 left in the game.

Alabama: 13–1, 8–1 SEC

=== Vs. #1 Clemson Tigers ===
#2 Alabama Crimson Tide vs #1 Clemson Tigers – Game summary

Quarter	1	2	3	4	Total
#2 Alabama	7	7	7	24	45
#1 Clemson	14	0	10	16	40

at University of Phoenix Stadium • Glendale, AZ

- Date: January 11, 2016
- Game time: 6:33 p.m.
- Game weather: Played indoors (retractable roof closed)
- Game attendance: 75,765
- Referee: Terry Leyden (Pac-12)
- TV announcers (ESPN): Chris Fowler (play-by-play), Kirk Herbstreit (color), Heather Cox & Tom Rinaldi (sideline)

Alabama came off a stellar defensive performance in the semifinal game, and was looking to contain Clemson's QB Deshaun Watson, but Alabama defense was quickly forced into conceding most of the field and stopping Clemson in the redzone. Alabama's offense was stressed at the line of scrimmage by Clemson's defensive line led by Shaq Lawson. Despite being statistically outplayed by Clemson (550 Clemson offensive yards to 473 Alabama) offensively and statistically tied in other areas, Alabama was able to capitalize on three key plays: an interception of Deshaun Watson's pass early in the second quarter, a surprise Alabama onside kick early in the fourth quarter, and an Alabama kickoff return for a touchdown in the middle of the fourth quarter. These plays accounted for 21 points, and Alabama won the game 45 to 40.

Having won the coin toss to start the game, Clemson elected to defer to the second half. Characteristic of Alabama, the offensive opening drive was slow and cautious but notable for utilizing Derrick Henry four times, a schematic change of pace from that of the Semifinal game against Michigan State. Alabama and Clemson would trade punting drives before, on the next Alabama possession, Derrick Henry was utilized three times. On the third run, Derrick would find an opening for a 50-yard touchdown run (7–0). However, on the next two Clemson possessions Deshaun Watson used his characteristic speed, agility, and elusiveness to sustain drives with a mixture of QB runs and fade routes against Alabama's top-ranked defense. These two drives both culminated in TD throws to Hunter Renfrow (7–14) the later of which ended the first quarter.

On Alabama's next possession to start the second quarter, despite a promising start in a 29-yard pass to Richard Mullaney, Alabama's offensive line conceded a sack by Kevin Dodd and a tackle for loss on Derrick Henry. Characteristic of Alabama, facing third and long offensive coordinator Lane Kiffin enacted for extra field position on a punt with a short throw to Ridley rather than attempting a first down pass. Despite the seemingly dire situation, on the ensuing Clemson drive Deshaun Watson was intercepted by Eddie Jackson at the Clemson 42 yard line. The resulting Alabama possession culminated in a 1-yard TD run by Derrick Henry (14–14). After this flurry, both Clemson and Alabama played more cautiously as each of the three following possessions by both teams went no further than 40 yards. Clemson's last possession of the half resulted in a blocked field goal.

Going into the third quarter, Clemson opted to receive the ball but was forced into a quick three and out. On Alabama's next possession, TE OJ Howard found himself open in space for a 53-yard touchdown (21–14). Clemson responded with a mixture of QB runs, pass plays by Deshaun Watson, and key run plays by RB Wayne Gallman on its next two drives to get a 37-yard field goal by Greg Hugel (21–17) and a 1-yard touchdown run by Wayne Gallman (21–24). Both teams were then stalled for three and outs or near three and outs on their next two possessions to close the Third quarter.

On Alabama's first possession of the fourth quarter, Jake Coker found ArDarius Stewart in single man coverage for 38 yards. This gain, however, did not translate into a touchdown as the offense was stalled by good secondary play from Clemson. Alabama settled for a field goal from 33 yards to tie the game (24–24). On the ensuing kickoff Alabama gambled on a surprise onside kick, executed to perfection by Adam Griffith and caught by Marlon Humphrey. Alabama capitalized almost immediately with another 50+ touchdown pass to a wide open OJ Howard (31–24). Clemson pulled within 4 once again. However, Alabama's defense held in the red zone and forced a field goal from Clemson (31–27). On the ensuing kickoff, Alabama RB Kenyan Drake stunned Clemson by taking the ball 95 yards for an Alabama touchdown (38–27). Deshaun Watson quickly answered with an 8-play, 75-yard touchdown drive which culminated in a 15-yard touchdown pass to WR Artavius Scott. In attempt to pull within three points of Alabama (and thus within a field goal of tying the game), Clemson attempted a two-point conversion with what morphed into a naked bootleg QB run by Deshaun Watson which was stopped short (38–33). On Alabama's next possession QB Jake Coker passed the ball in a checkdown screen to OJ Howard who, getting good blocking, ran for 63 yards. With less than 3 minutes left in the game, Alabama ran the ball up the middle to convert downs. After a key third down scramble for a first down by Jake Coker, Derrick Henry, on third down, broke the touchdown plane with the nose of the ball over the top of the goal line pile of players for a 1-yard TD run (45–33). A stellar performance by Deshaun Watson on a 55-second drive culminated in a 24-yard touchdown pass to Jordan Leggett with 12 seconds left on the clock (45–40). Clemson attempted an onside kick but the ball was recovered by Alabama sealing the victory and the national championship for the Crimson Tide. This was the fourth Alabama national championship win in seven years, first of the CFP era, and Head Coach Nick Saban's fifth overall.

Alabama: 14–1, 8–1 SEC

== Rankings ==
Ranking movements Legend: ██ Increase in ranking ██ Decrease in ranking ( ) = First-place votes
	Week															
Poll	Pre	1	2	3	4	5	6	7	8	9	10	11	12	13	14	Final
AP	3	2	2	12	13	8	10	8	7 (1)	7 (1)	3 (2)	3 (4)	2 (6)	2 (8)	2 (9)	1 (61)
Coaches	3 (1)	2 (1)	2 (1)	12	13	10	9	8	7	7	4 (3)	3 (4)	2 (5)	2 (8)	2 (5)	1 (56)
CFP	Not released									4	2	2	2	2	2	Not released

== Statistics ==
=== Team ===
Team Statistics
	Alabama	Opponents
Points		
First Downs		
Rushing		
Passing		
Penalty		
Rushing Yards		
Rushing Attempts		
Average Per Rush		
Long		
Rushing TDs		
Passing Yards		
Comp–Att		
Comp %		
Average Per Game		
Average per Attempt		
Passing TDs		
INT's		
Rating		
Touchdowns		
Passing		
Rushing		
Defensive		
Interceptions		
Yards		
Long		
Total Offense		
Total Plays		
Average Per Yards/Game		
Kick Returns: # – Yards		
TDs		
Long		
Punts		
Yards		
Average		
Punt Returns: # – Yards		
TDs		
Long		
Fumbles – Fumbles Lost		
Opposing TD's		
Penalties – Yards		
3rd–Down Conversions		
4th–Down Conversions		
Takeaways		
Field Goals		
Extra Point		
Sacks		
Sack Against		
Yards		

=== Offense ===
Passing Statistics
#	NAME	POS	RAT	CMP	ATT	YDS	CMP%	TD	INT

Rushing Statistics
#	NAME	POS	CAR	YDS	LONG	TD
	TOTALS					

Receiving Statistics
#	NAME	POS	REC	YDS	LONG	TD
	TOTALS					

=== Defense ===
Key: POS: Position, SOLO: Solo Tackles, AST: Assisted Tackles, TOT: Total Tackles, TFL: Tackles-for-loss, SACK: Quarterback Sacks, INT: Interceptions, BU: Passes Broken Up, PD: Passes Defended, QBH: Quarterback Hits, FF: Forced Fumbles, FR: Fumbles Recovered, BLK: Kicks or Punts Blocked, SAF: Safeties

Defensive Statistics
#	NAME	POS	SOLO	AST	TOT	TFL-YDS	SACKS	INT-YDS	BU	PD	QBH	FR–YDS	FF	BLK	SAF
	TOTAL		0	0	0	0 – 0	0 – 0	0 – 0	0	0	0	0 – 0	0	–	–
	OPPONENTS		0	0	0	0 – 0	0 – 0	0 – 0	0	0	0	0 – 0	0	0	–

Interceptions Statistics
#	NAME	POS	RTNS	YDS	AVG	TD	LNG
	TOTALS						

=== Special teams ===
Kicking statistics
#	NAME	POS	XPM	XPA	XP%	FGM	FGA	FG%	1–19	20–29	30–39	40–49	50+	LNG	PTS
	TOTALS														

Kick return statistics
#	NAME	POS	RTNS	YDS	AVG	TD	LNG
	TOTALS						

Punting statistics
#	NAME	POS	PUNTS	YDS	AVG	LONG	TB	FC	I–20	50+	BLK
	TOTALS										

Punt return statistics
#	NAME	POS	RTNS	YDS	AVG	TD	LONG
	TOTALS						

=== Scores by quarter (all opponents) ===
	1	2	3	4	Total
All opponents	3	27	23	27	80
Alabama	24	61	59	37	181

=== Scores by quarter (SEC opponents) ===
	1	2	3	4	Total
SEC opponents	3	17	20	13	53
Alabama	3	31	21	20	75

== Postseason and awards ==
=== Conference awards ===
SEC Offensive Player of the Year – Derrick Henry, RB

SEC Defensive Player of the Year – Reggie Ragland, LB

SEC Scholar-Athlete of the Year – Ryan Kelly, C

SEC Jacobs Blocking Trophy – Ryan Kelly, C

=== Preseason award watchlists ===
Overall awards

Offensive awards

Defensive awards

=== Finalists ===
Players

Heisman Trophy – Derrick Henry, RB

Maxwell Award – Derrick Henry, RB

Coaches

=== Honors ===
Week 1

Week 2

Week 3

Week 4

Week 5

Week 6

Week 7

Week 8

Week 9

Week 10

Week 11

Week 12

Week 13

Week 14

- Bye

Preseason All-SEC team

First-Team Offense

- OL, Cam Robinson, Alabama (167)
- C, Ryan Kelly, Alabama (144)

Second-Team Offense

- RB, Derrick Henry, Alabama (151)

Third-Team Offense

- RB, Kenyan Drake, Alabama (34)
- TE, O. J. Howard, Alabama (87)

First-Team Defense

- DL, A'Shawn Robinson, Alabama (160)
- LB, Reggie Ragland, Alabama (181)
- DB, Cyrus Jones, Alabama (126)

Second-Team Defense

- DL, Jonathan Allen, Alabama (99)

Third-Team Defense

- DL, Jarran Reed, Alabama (60)
- DB, Eddie Jackson, Alabama (58)

First-Team Special Teams

- P, J. K. Scott, Alabama (161)

Preseason All-Americans

==== All-Americans ====
Each year several publications release lists of their ideal "team". The athletes on these lists are referred to as All-Americans. The NCAA recognizes five All-American lists. They are the Associated Press (AP), American Football Coaches Association (AFCA), Football Writers Association of America (FWAA), Sporting News (SN), and the Walter Camp Football Foundation (WCFF). If a player is selected to the first team of three publications he is considered a consensus All-American, if a player is selected to the first team of all five publications he is considered a unanimous All-American.

Key:
First team
Consensus All-American
Unanimous All-American

==== SEC All-Conference Team ====
The Crimson Tide had TBA players honored as members of the 2015 SEC All-Conference team, with five each on the first and second teams, respectively. TBA other Crimson Tide earned honorable mention honors.

- First Team
- Second Team
- Honorable Mention

=== All-Academic Teams ===
==== SEC Conference All-Academic Players ====
The Crimson Tide had two players selected to the Southeastern Conference All-Academic Second Team, six players granted honorable mention and no players selected to the First Team. In order to be eligible for the academic team a player must maintain a minimum 3.0 overall grade-point average and play in at least 50 percent of their team's games.

- First team
- Second Team
- Honorable Mention

=== Records broken ===
1. Alabama played the most difficult schedule of any national championship team in NCAA history. Of the 15 teams Alabama played, 14 had a winning record, 13 played in bowl games and Alabama defeated 12 of them, 8 won bowl their games, 6 won 10 or more games, 3 won 9 games, 2 won 8 games, and 2 won 7 games. Two conference champions (Big 10 and ACC) were defeated in the Playoffs by Alabama. 7 of Alabama's opponents were ranked in the final AP Poll (#2 Clemson, #6 Michigan State, #10 Ole Miss, #16 LSU, #21 Wisconsin, #22 Tennessee, #25 Florida). In the final Coaches Poll, 8 of Alabama's opponents were ranked (the same teams as in the AP plus #24 Georgia).

2. Alabama's opponents had a 134–49 combined record for a 73% combined winning percentage (not counting head-to-head games against Alabama): the highest opponent combined winning percentage of any national championship team in NCAA history.

3. Derrick Henry set an SEC rushing record in 2015: 395 rushes for 2219 yards, eclipsing Herschel Walker's 1981 SEC rushing record of 1891 yards on 381 carries.

4. Derrick Henry set an SEC rushing TD record with 28 rushing TDs, eclipsing the previous record of 23 previously held by Tim Tebow (2007) and Tre Mason (2013).

5. Derrick Henry set an SEC single season rushing carries record with 395 carries, eclipsing the previous 1981 record of 381 carries set by Georgia's Herschel Walker.

6. O.J. Howard set a BCS/Playoff national championship game receiving yards record with 5 receptions totaling 208 yards.

=== Postseason games ===
Senior Bowl

All Star Game

== NFL draft ==
The following members of 2015 Alabama Crimson Tide football team were selected in the 2016 NFL draft.

=== NFL Draft and Draft Evaluations ===
Player	Round	Pick	Position	NFL Club
Ryan Kelly	1	18	Center	Indianapolis Colts
Reggie Ragland	2	41	Linebacker	Buffalo Bills
Derrick Henry	2	45	Running back	Tennessee Titans
A'Shawn Robinson	2	46	Defensive lineman	Detroit Lions
Jarran Reed	2	49	Defensive lineman	Seattle Seahawks
Cyrus Jones	2	60	Cornerback	New England Patriots
Kenyan Drake	3	73	Running back	Miami Dolphins

=== NFL Draft Combine ===
Seven members of the 2015 team were invited to participate in drills at the 2016 NFL scouting Combine.

2016 NFL Combine Participants
Name	POS	HT	WT	Arms	Hands	40	Bench Press	Vert Jump	Broad Jump	3 Cone Drill	20-yd Shuttle	60-yd Shuttle	Ref
R. Kelly	C	6'4"	311	33.63"	9.63"	5.03	26 reps	30 inches	103 inches	7.58	4.59 sec	DNP	
R. Ragland	ILB	6'2"	247	32"	9.88"	4.72	DNP	31.5 inches	DNP	DNP	4.28 sec	DNP	
D. Henry	RB	6'3"	247	33"	8.75"	4.54	22 reps	37 inches	130 inches	7.20	4.38 sec	11.50	
A. Robinson	DT	6'4"	307	34.5"	10.50"	5.20	22 reps	26 inches	106 inches	7.80	4.74 sec	DNP	
J. Reed	DT	6'3"	307	33.38"	10.50"	5.21	DNP	31 inches	DNP	7.77	4.75 sec	DNP	
C. Jones	CB	5'10"	197	31.38"	9.13"	4.49	10 reps	33 inches	116 inches	6.71	4.21 sec	DNP	
K. Drake	RB	6'1"	210	31.75"	9.75"	4.45	10 reps	34.5 inches	123 inches	7.04	4.21 sec	DNP	

† Top performer

DNP = Did not participate
