= Jake Coker =

American football player (born 1992)

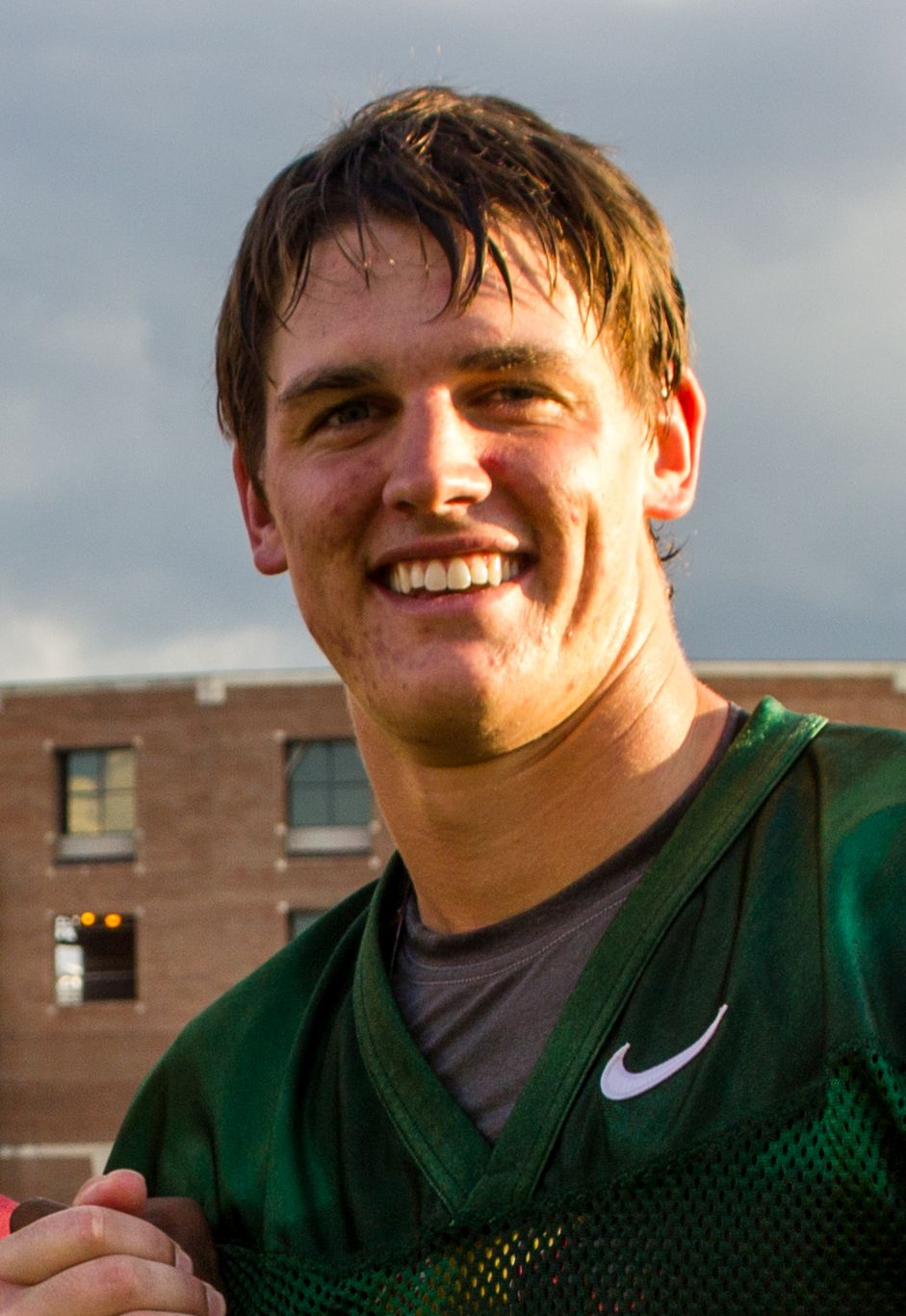
- Coker in 2013

No. 6
- Position: Quarterback

Personal information
- Born: August 4, 1992 (age 34); Mobile, Alabama, U.S.
- Listed height: 6 ft 5 in (1.96 m)
- Listed weight: 235 lb (107 kg)

Career information
- High school: St. Paul's Episcopal School (Mobile)
- College: Florida State (2011–2013); Alabama (2014–2015)
- NFL draft: 2016: undrafted

Career history
- Arizona Cardinals (2016)*
- * Offseason or practice squad member only

Awards and highlights
- CFP national champion (2015); BCS national champion (2013)
- Stats at Pro Football Reference

Bryant Jacob "Jake" Coker (born August 4, 1992) is an American former football player. He played college football for the Florida State Seminoles and Alabama Crimson Tide. He won the national championship as the starting quarterback of the Alabama Crimson Tide in 2015.

== Early life ==
Coker attended St. Paul's Episcopal School in Mobile, Alabama. He played both football and basketball. He was ranked by Rivals.com as the 18th best pro-style quarterback recruit in his class. He committed to Florida State University in June 2010.

== College career ==
Coker was redshirted as a freshman in 2011. As a backup to EJ Manuel in 2012, he appeared in three games, completing three-of-five passes for 45 yards and one touchdown. As a redshirt sophomore, Coker competed with Jameis Winston for the starting quarterback job in 2013. Winston won the job and Coker was his backup until a knee injury in November caused him to miss the rest of the season. He had appeared in six games, going 18 of 36 for 250 yards and one interception.

In January 2014, Coker transferred to the University of Alabama. He had suffered some injuries and, as he later said, "things didn't work out at Florida State". Alabama had shown interest but he had already committed and stuck to his commitment, but his dream had always been to play for Alabama under coach Nick Saban.

He was eligible to play immediately and did not have to sit out a year after graduating from Florida State in April. In his first year at Alabama he competed for the Crimson Tide's starting job. Blake Sims won the competition with Coker as the backup. Coker again competed for the starting job in 2015, and this time won the competition.

Coker helped lead the Crimson Tide to win the 2016 College Football Playoff National Championship Game against the Clemson Tigers, with a final score of 45–40. The team's only loss was against Ole Miss, a game Coker later said changed his approach to the game.

On January 30, 2016, Coker was the starting quarterback for the South in the Senior Bowl in Mobile, Alabama. In one quarter, he was 3-of-8 passing for 23 yards and led his team to the first touchdown of the game.

=== Statistics ===
Season	Team	Games			Passing								Rushing			
Season	Team	GP	GS	Record	Comp	Att	Pct	Yards	Avg	TD	Int	Rate	Att	Yards	Avg	TD
2011	Florida State	Redshirt (redshirt)														
2012	Florida State	4	0	—	3	5	60.0	45	9.0	1	0	201.6	0	0	0.0	0
2013	Florida State	6	0	—	18	36	50.0	250	6.9	0	1	102.8	10	15	1.5	1
2014	Alabama	6	0	—	38	59	64.4	403	6.8	4	0	144.2	7	13	1.9	0
2015	Alabama	15	14	14−0	263	393	66.9	3,110	7.9	21	8	147.0	74	68	0.9	2
Career		31	14	14−0	322	493	65.3	3,808	7.7	26	9	143.9	91	96	1.1	3

== Professional career ==
On April 30, 2016, Coker signed a free agent deal with the Arizona Cardinals after going undrafted in the 2016 NFL draft. He was released by the team on August 29, as part of a roster cut to 75 players.

On April 21, 2017, after being unable to fully recover from knee surgery, Coker announced his retirement from football. “I’m just going to move on,” Coker said. “I had another surgery when I was with the (Arizona) Cardinals, and that was kind of the last thing. I didn’t want another surgery. I’m just kind of ready to move on. I’m excited about what’s ahead.”

== After football ==
Coker and his wife moved back to Mobile and he got a job in commercial insurance; they had a baby in early 2020.
