= 2016 College Football Playoff National Championship =

2016 College Football Playoff National Championship presented by AT&T
- 2nd College Football Playoff National Championship
Alabama Crimson Tide	Clemson Tigers
(13–1)	(14–0)
SEC	ACC
45	40
Head coach: Nick Saban	Head coach: Dabo Swinney
AP / Coaches / CFP; 2 / 2 / 2	AP / Coaches / CFP; 1 / 1 / 1
	1	2	3	4	Total
Alabama	7	7	7	24	45
Clemson	14	0	10	16	40
- Date: January 11, 2016
- Season: 2015
- Stadium: University of Phoenix Stadium
- Location: Glendale, Arizona
- MVP: O. J. Howard (Alabama, TE); Eddie Jackson (Alabama, S)
- Favorite: Alabama by 6½
- National anthem: Ciara
- Referee: Terry Leyden (Pac-12)
- Halftime show: Clemson University Tiger Band; Million Dollar Band
- Attendance: 75,765

United States TV coverage
- Network: ESPN and ESPN Radio
- Announcers: Chris Fowler (play-by-play); Kirk Herbstreit (analyst); Heather Cox and Tom Rinaldi (sideline) (ESPN); Mike Tirico, Todd Blackledge, Holly Rowe and Joe Schad (ESPN Radio)
- Nielsen ratings: 16.0 (26.18 million viewers)

International TV coverage
- Network: ESPN Deportes
- Announcers: Lalo Varela, Pablo Viruega, Bernardo Osuna, and Carlos Nava

The 2016 College Football Playoff National Championship was a college football bowl game played on January 11, 2016, at the University of Phoenix Stadium in Glendale, Arizona. The second College Football Playoff National Championship, the game determined a national champion of the NCAA Division I Football Bowl Subdivision (FBS) for the 2015 season. This was the culminating game of the 2015–16 bowl season.

The game was played between the winners of two pre-designated semifinal bowls played on December 31, 2015: the No. 1 Clemson Tigers, who beat the No. 4 Oklahoma Sooners 37–17 at the Orange Bowl, coached by Dabo Swinney in his 8th season, and the No. 2 Alabama Crimson Tide, who shut out the No. 3 Michigan State Spartans 38–0 at the Cotton Bowl Classic, coached by Nick Saban.

The 13–1 Alabama Crimson Tide won the game, holding off the undefeated Clemson Tigers 45–40 in the fourth quarter. Accompanied by a talented receiving corps, Clemson's Heisman Finalist quarterback Deshaun Watson had a historic performance, setting the record for most total yards in national championship game history, with 478 yards (405 passing / 73 rushing) against the nation's third-ranked defense in Alabama, breaking the record previously set by Vince Young in the 2006 Rose Bowl. Following the game, the AP Poll also named Alabama as its top team of the season, giving Alabama their fourth title in seven seasons. Both Clemson and Alabama finished the season 14–1.

== Background ==
University of Phoenix Stadium in Glendale, Arizona was announced as the host site in December 2013, along with 2017 host Raymond James Stadium. The Arizona Organizing Committee, co-chaired by Brad Wright and Win Holden, hosted the game.

== Teams ==
The championship game marked the 16th meeting between the two schools. The last previous meeting was the season opener in the 2008 Chick-fil-A Kickoff Game.

=== Alabama ===
Alabama was led by head coach Nick Saban. The Crimson Tide played Michigan State in the semifinals at the 2015 Cotton Bowl Classic, winning 38–0.

=== Clemson ===
Clemson was led by head coach Dabo Swinney. The Tigers played Oklahoma in the semifinals at the 2015 Orange Bowl, winning 37–17.

== Starting lineups ==
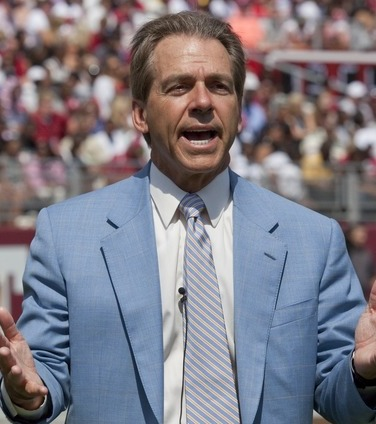
Alabama head coach Nick Saban

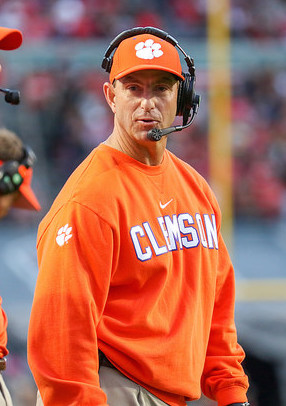
Clemson head coach Dabo Swinney

Alabama	Position		Clemson
Offense
Calvin Ridley 1	WR		Artavis Scott
Richard Mullaney	WR		Charone Peake 7
Cam Robinson 2	LT		Mitch Hyatt
Ross Pierschbacher 5	LG		Eric Mac Lain
† Ryan Kelly 1	C		Jay Guillermo
Alphonse Taylor	RG		Tyrone Crowder Jr.
Dominick Jackson	RT		Joe Gore
O. J. Howard 1	TE		Jordan Leggett 5
ArDarius Stewart 3	WR		Hunter Renfrow 5
Jake Coker	QB		† Deshaun Watson 1
† Derrick Henry 2	RB		Wayne Gallman 4
Defense
† A'Shawn Robinson 2	DL	DE	† Shaq Lawson 1
Jonathan Allen 1	DL	DT	D. J. Reader 5
Jarran Reed 2	DL	DT	Carlos Watkins 4
Minkah Fitzpatrick 1	CB	DE	Kevin Dodd 2
Denzel Devall	JLB	SLB	Travis Blanks
† Reggie Ragland 2	MLB		B. J. Goodson 4
Reuben Foster 1	WLB		Ben Boulware
Cyrus Jones 2	CB		Mackensie Alexander 2
Marlon Humphrey 1	CB		Cordrea Tankersley 3
Eddie Jackson 4	SS		Jayron Kearse 7
Geno Matias-Smith	FS		T. J. Green 2
†= 2015 All-American
Selected in an NFL Draft (number corresponds to draft round)

== Game summary ==
Alabama came off a stellar defensive performance in the semifinal game, and was looking to contain Clemson's QB Deshaun Watson, but Alabama defense was quickly forced into conceding most of the field and stopping Clemson in the redzone. Alabama's offense was stressed at the line of scrimmage by Clemson's defensive line led by Shaq Lawson. Despite being statistically outplayed by Clemson (550 Clemson offensive yards to 473 Alabama) offensively and statistically tied in other areas, Alabama was able to capitalize on three key plays: an interception of Deshaun Watson's pass early in the second quarter, a surprise Alabama onside kick early in the fourth quarter, and an Alabama kickoff return for a touchdown in the middle of the fourth quarter. These plays accounted for 21 points, and Alabama won the game 45 to 40.

=== First half ===
Having won the coin toss to start the game, Clemson elected to defer to the second half. Characteristic of Alabama, the offensive opening drive was slow and cautious but notable for utilizing Derrick Henry four times, a change from the semifinal game against Michigan State. Alabama and Clemson would trade punting drives before, on the next Alabama possession, Derrick Henry was utilized three times. On the third run, Derrick found an opening for a 50-yard touchdown run (7-0). However, on the next two Clemson possessions Deshaun Watson used his speed, agility, and elusiveness to sustain drives with a mixture of QB runs and fade routes against Alabama's top-ranked defense. Both drives ended in TD throws to Hunter Renfrow (7-14), the latter of which ended the first quarter.

On Alabama's next possession to start the second quarter, despite a promising start in a 29-yard pass to Richard Mullaney, Alabama's offensive line conceded a sack by Kevin Dodd and a tackle for loss on Derrick Henry. Characteristic of Alabama, facing third and long offensive coordinator Lane Kiffin opted for extra field position on a punt with a short throw to Ridley rather than attempting a first down pass. On the ensuing Clemson drive Deshaun Watson was intercepted by Eddie Jackson at the Clemson 42 yard line. The resulting Alabama possession culminated in a 1-yard TD run by Derrick Henry (14-14). After this flurry, both Clemson and Alabama played more cautiously as each of the three following possessions by both teams went no further than 40 yards. Clemson's last possession of the half resulted in a blocked field goal.

=== Second half ===
Going into the third quarter, Clemson opted to receive the ball but was forced into a quick three and out. On Alabama's next possession, TE OJ Howard found himself open in space for a 53-yard touchdown (21-14). Clemson responded with a mixture of QB runs, pass plays by Deshaun Watson, and key run plays by RB Wayne Gallman on its next two drives to get a 37-yard field goal by Greg Hugel (21-17) and a 1-yard touchdown run by Wayne Gallman (21-24). Both teams were then stalled for three and outs or near three and outs on their next two possessions to close the Third quarter.

On Alabama's first possession of the fourth quarter, Jacob Coker found ArDarius Stewart in single man coverage for 38 yards. This gain, however, did not translate into a touchdown as the offense was stalled by good secondary play from Clemson. Alabama settled for a field goal from 33 yards to tie the game (24-24). On the ensuing kickoff Alabama gambled on a surprise onside kick, executed to perfection by Adam Griffith and caught by Marlon Humphrey. Alabama capitalized almost immediately with another 50+ touchdown pass to a wide open OJ Howard (31-24). Clemson pulled within 4 once again. However, Alabama's defense held in the red zone and forced a field goal from Clemson (31-27). On the ensuing kickoff, Alabama RB Kenyan Drake stunned Clemson by taking the ball 95 yards for an Alabama touchdown (38-27). Deshaun Watson quickly answered with an 8 play 75 yard touchdown drive which culminated in a 15-yard touchdown pass to WR Artavius Scott. In attempt to pull within three points of Alabama (and thus within a field goal of tying the game), Clemson attempted a two-point conversion with what morphed into a naked bootleg QB run by Deshaun Watson which was stopped short (38-33). On Alabama's next possession QB Jacob Coker passed the ball in a checkdown screen to OJ Howard who, getting good blocking, ran for 63 yards. With less than 3 minutes left in the game, ran the ball up the middle to convert downs. After a key third down scramble for a first down by Jacob Coker, Derrick Henry, on third down, broke the touchdown plane with the nose of the ball over the top of the goal line pile of players for a 1-yard TD run (45-33). A stellar performance by Deshaun Watson on a 55-second drive culminated in a 24-yard touchdown pass to Jordan Leggett with 12 seconds left on the clock (45-40). Clemson attempted an onside kick but the ball was recovered by Alabama sealing their victory. This was the fourth Alabama national championship win in seven years, its first of the College Football Playoff era, and head coach Nick Saban's fifth overall.

=== Scoring summary ===
2016 College Football Playoff National Championship

Quarter	1	2	3	4	Total
No. 2 Alabama	7	7	7	24	45
No. 1 Clemson	14	0	10	16	40

at the University of Phoenix Stadium • Glendale, Arizona

- Date: Monday, January 11, 2016
- Game time: 6:30 p.m. MST
- Game weather: Indoors
- Game attendance: 75,765
- Referee: Terry Leyden (Pac-12)
- TV announcers (ESPN): Chris Fowler (play-by-play), Kirk Herbstreit (analyst), Heather Cox and Tom Rinaldi (sidelines)
- Box score

Scoring summary

Quarter	Time	Drive			Team	Scoring information	Score	
Quarter	Time	Plays	Yards	TOP	Team	Scoring information	ALA	CLEM
1	7:55	3	59	0:55	ALA	Derrick Henry 50-yard touchdown run, Adam Griffith kick good	7	0
1	5:18	6	59	2:37	CLEM	Hunter Renfrow 31-yard touchdown reception from Deshaun Watson, Greg Huegel kick good	7	7
1	0:00	7	73	2:17	CLEM	Hunter Renfrow 11-yard touchdown reception from Deshaun Watson, Greg Huegel kick good	7	14
2	9:35	7	42	2:23	ALA	Derrick Henry 1-yard touchdown run, Adam Griffith kick good	14	14
3	12:53	3	64	0:53	ALA	O. J. Howard 53-yard touchdown reception from Jake Coker, Adam Griffith kick good	21	14
3	10:10	9	55	2:43	CLEM	37-yard field goal by Greg Huegel	21	17
3	4:48	9	60	3:38	CLEM	Wayne Gallman 1-yard touchdown run, Greg Huegel kick good	21	24
4	10:34	8	64	2:33	ALA	33-yard field goal by Adam Griffith	24	24
4	9:45	2	50	0:49	ALA	O. J. Howard 51-yard touchdown reception from Jake Coker, Adam Griffith kick good	31	24
4	7:47	6	61	1:58	CLEM	31-yard field goal by Greg Huegel	31	27
4	7:31	-	-	-	ALA	Kick returned 95 yards for touchdown by Kenyan Drake, Adam Griffith kick good	38	27
4	4:40	8	75	2:51	CLEM	Artavis Scott 15-yard touchdown reception from Deshaun Watson, 2-point run failed	38	33
4	1:07	8	75	3:33	ALA	Derrick Henry 1-yard touchdown run, Adam Griffith kick good	45	33
4	0:12	6	68	0:55	CLEM	Jordan Leggett 24-yard touchdown reception from Deshaun Watson, Greg Huegel kick good	45	40
"TOP" = time of possession. For other American football terms, see Glossary of American football.							45	40

=== Statistics ===
Statistics	Alabama	Clemson
First downs	18	31
Plays–yards	71–473	85–550
Rushes–yards	46–138	38–145
Passing yards	335	405
Passing: Comp–Att–Int	11–25–0	37–47–1
Time of possession	30:31	29:29

== Broadcasting ==
The game was broadcast in the United States by ESPN, ESPN Deportes, and ESPN Radio, with Chris Fowler and Kirk Herbstreit as English commentators on TV, and Eduardo Varela and Pablo Viruega as Spanish commentators. In Brazil, the game was broadcast on ESPN Brazil by Everaldo Marques (play by play) and Antony Curti (color commentator). As in 2015, ESPN provided Megacast coverage of the game, which supplemented coverage with analysis and additional perspectives of the game on different ESPN channels and platforms.

An average of 23.6 million viewers watched the game, representing a 29% decrease over the 2015 title game, which was seen by 33.4 million viewers. The game was the sixth-highest-rated broadcast in U.S. cable television history (by contrast, the 2015 game was the highest-rated), and ESPN reported that the game brought the network its third-highest overnight ratings (behind the 2010 and 2015 title games).

=== Local radio ===
Network	Play-by-play	Color commentator(s)	Sideline reporter(s)
WFFN–FM 95.3, WDGM-FM 99.1 and Crimson Tide Sports Network (Alabama)	Eli Gold	Phil Savage	Chris Stewart
WCCP-FM 105.5 and Clemson Tigers Sports Network (Clemson)	Don Munson	Rodney Williams	Patrick Sapp

== See also ==
- College football national championships in NCAA Division I FBS
- Alabama–Clemson football rivalry
