= 2016 Fiesta Bowl (December) =

College Football Playoff Semifinal bowl game

2016 PlayStation Fiesta Bowl
- College Football Playoff Semifinal; 46th Fiesta Bowl
Ohio State Buckeyes	Clemson Tigers
(11–1)	(12–1)
Big Ten	ACC
0	31
Head coach: Urban Meyer	Head coach: Dabo Swinney
AP / Coaches / CFP; 2 / 2 / 3	AP / Coaches / CFP; 3 / 3 / 2
	1	2	3	4	Total
Ohio State	0	0	0	0	0
Clemson	10	7	7	7	31
- Date: December 31, 2016
- Season: 2016
- Stadium: University of Phoenix Stadium
- Location: Glendale, Arizona
- MVP: Deshaun Watson (QB, Clemson); Clelin Ferrell (DE, Clemson)
- Favorite: Ohio State by 1
- Referee: Land Clark (Pac-12)
- Halftime show: Bands from participants
- Attendance: 70,236

United States TV coverage
- Network: ESPN
- Announcers: Chris Fowler, Kirk Herbstreit, Samantha Ponder and Tom Rinaldi

International TV coverage
- Network: ESPN Deportes

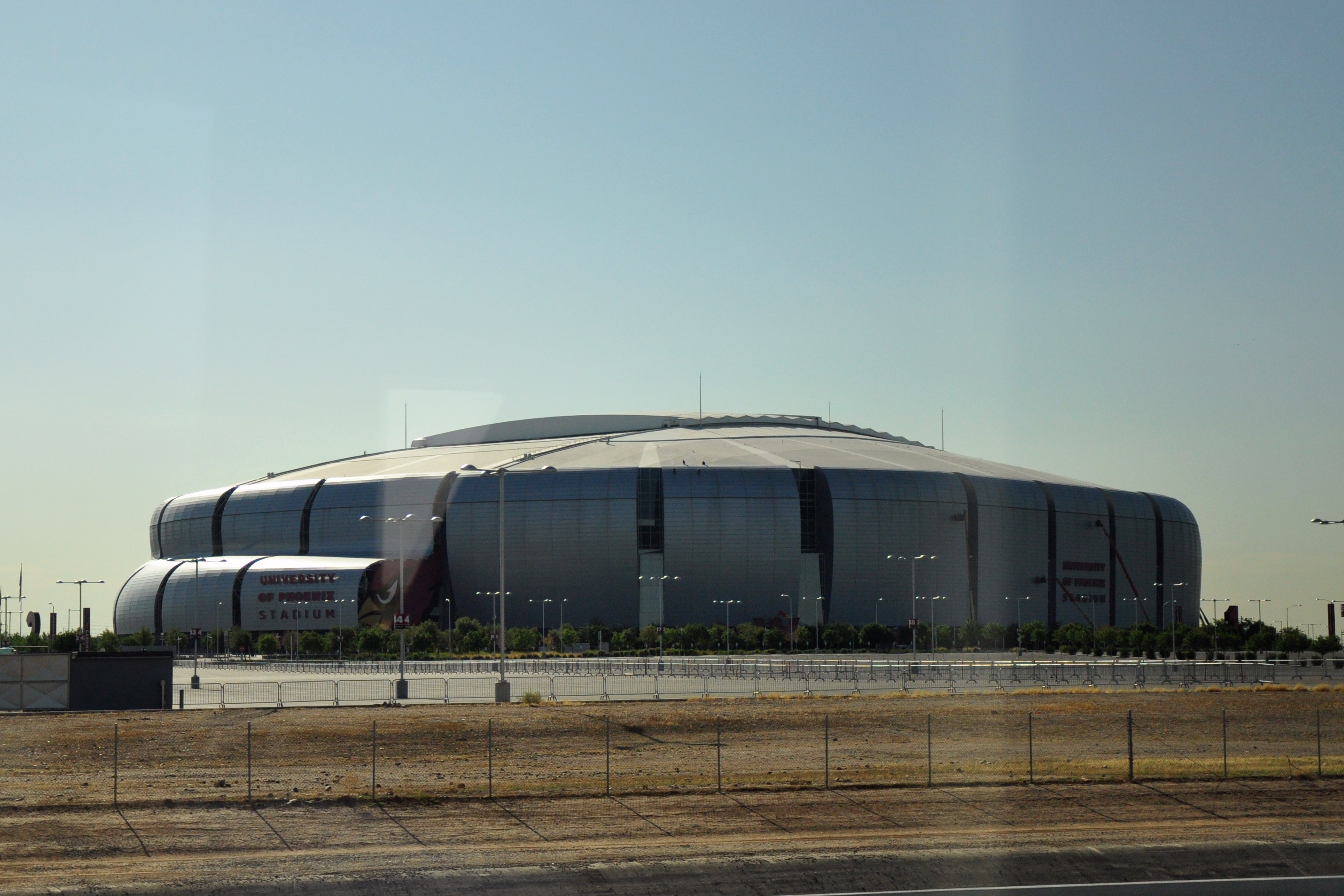
University of Phoenix Stadium in Glendale, Arizona, hosted the Fiesta Bowl.

The 2016 Fiesta Bowl (officially known as the College Football Playoff Semifinal at the 2016 PlayStation Fiesta Bowl for sponsorship reasons) was a college football bowl game played on December 31, 2016, at University of Phoenix Stadium in Glendale, Arizona. It was the 46th playing of the Fiesta Bowl and the second semifinal of the 2016–17 College Football Playoff (CFP), part of the slate of bowl games that concluded the 2016 FBS football season. The game featured two of the four teams chosen by the CFP selection committee: the No. 2 Clemson Tigers from the Atlantic Coast Conference (ACC) and the No. 3 Ohio State Buckeyes from the Big Ten Conference. The winner qualified for the 2017 College Football Playoff National Championship against the winner of the other semifinal, hosted by the Peach Bowl. The game was broadcast on ESPN, ESPN Radio, and ESPN Deportes.

Clemson became just the second team in college football history to shut out Ohio State (11–2) in a bowl game, joining Cal in the 1921 Rose Bowl. The game also marked the first time that Buckeyes head coach Urban Meyer was shut out in his career, in about 193 games, and his second major loss to Dabo Swinney in the past four seasons. The game also marked the second consecutive advance to the CFP National Championship game by the Clemson football program.

== Teams ==
On Sunday December 4, 2016, the CFP Semifinals was announced with #2 Clemson vs. #3 Ohio State playing in the Fiesta Bowl.

This was the third meeting between the schools, with Clemson having won both of the previous matchups. The most recent meeting was the 2014 Orange Bowl, where the Tigers defeated the Buckeyes by a score of 40–35.

== Game summary ==
=== Scoring summary ===
Scoring summary

Quarter	Time	Drive			Team	Scoring information	Score	
Quarter	Time	Plays	Yards	TOP	Team	Scoring information	Ohio State	Clemson
1	9:16	7	42	2:36	Clemson	45-yard field goal by Greg Huegel	0	3
1	2:16	10	70	3:43	Clemson	Deshaun Watson 1-yard touchdown run, Greg Huegel kick good	0	10
2	2:21	8	83	3:44	Clemson	C.J. Fuller 30-yard touchdown reception from Deshaun Watson, Greg Huegel kick good	0	17
3	2:06	5	40	2:03	Clemson	Deshaun Watson 7-yard touchdown run, Greg Huegel kick good	0	24
4	8:51	2	7	0:34	Clemson	Wayne Gallman 7-yard touchdown run, Greg Huegel kick good	0	31
"TOP" = time of possession. For other American football terms, see Glossary of American football.							0	31

== Statistics ==
Team statistical comparison
Statistic	Ohio State	Clemson
First downs	9	24
First downs rushing	3	12
First downs passing	4	12
First downs penalty	2	0
Third down efficiency	3–14	8–17
Fourth down efficiency	0–2	0–1
Total plays–net yards	56–215	85–470
Rushing attempts–net yards	23–88	48–205
Yards per rush	3.8	4.3
Yards passing	127	265
Pass completions–attempts	19–33	24–37
Interceptions thrown	2	2
Punt returns–total yards	1–(−1)	2–16
Kickoff returns–total yards	5–128	0–0
Punts–average yardage	7–49.7	5–41.2
Fumbles–lost	2–1	0–0
Penalties–yards	8–72	5–60
Time of possession	22:47	35:51

Ohio State statistics
Buckeyes passing
	C–A	Yds	TD–INT
J. T. Barrett	19–33	127	0–2
Buckeyes rushing
	Car	Yds	TD
Curtis Samuel	6	67	0
Mike Weber	5	24	0
TEAM	1	−1	0
J. T. Barrett	11	−2	0
Buckeyes receiving
	Rec	Yds	TD
Curtis Samuel	9	43	0
Corey Smith	2	27	0
Binjimen Victor	1	21	0
Noah Brown	2	17	0
K. J. Hill	1	8	0
Terry McLaurin	1	7	0
Mike Weber	3	4	0

Clemson statistics
Tigers passing
	C–A	Yds	TD–INT
Deshaun Watson	23–36	259	1–2
Nick Schuessler	1–1	6	0–0
Tigers rushing
	Car	Yds	TD
Wayne Gallman	18	85	1
Deshaun Watson	15	57	2
Nick Schuessler	1	19	0
Adam Choice	4	16	0
Tavien Feaster	3	12	0
Artavis Scott	3	8	0
Ray-Ray McCloud	2	8	0
C.J. Fuller	1	3	0
TEAM	1	−3	0
Tigers receiving
	Rec	Yds	TD
Mike Williams	6	96	0
Hunter Renfrow	5	50	0
C.J. Fuller	3	45	1
Ray-Ray McCloud	4	29	0
Artavis Scott	2	16	0
Wayne Gallman	1	10	0
Deon Cain	1	9	0
Garrett Williams	1	6	0
Jordan Leggett	1	4	0

== See also ==
- 2019 Fiesta Bowl (December) – Also a CFP Semifinal featuring Clemson and Ohio State, won by Clemson
- 2021 Sugar Bowl – Also a CFP Semifinal featuring Clemson and Ohio State, featured Ohio State's first overall win against Clemson
