= 2016–17 College Football Playoff =

Postseason college football tournament

- Season: 2016
- Dates: December 31, 2016 – January 9, 2017
- Teams invited: (1) Alabama; (2) Clemson; (3) Ohio State; (4) Washington
- Venues: Georgia Dome; Raymond James Stadium; University of Phoenix Stadium
- Champions: Clemson (1st CFP title, 2nd overall title)

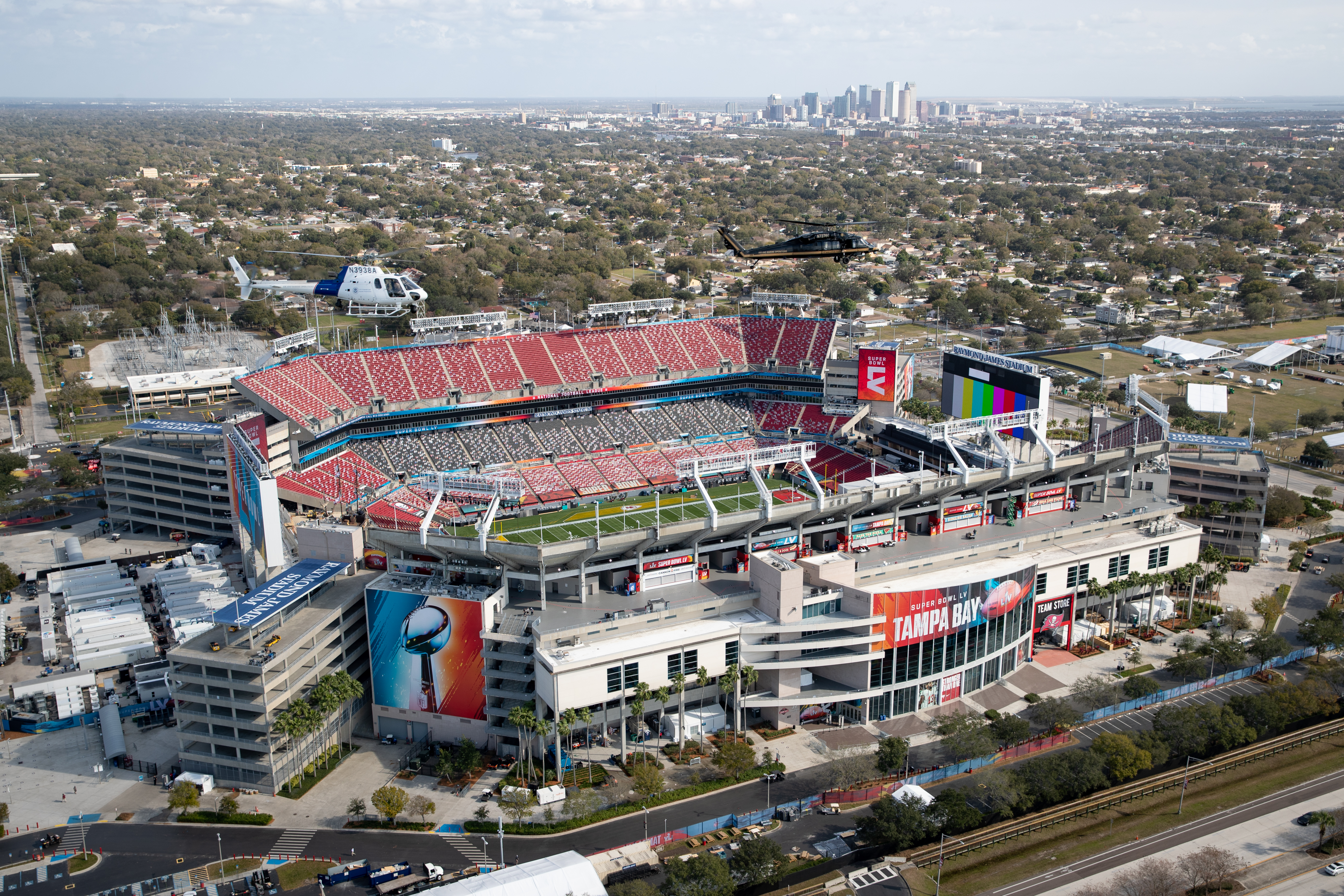
Raymond James Stadium in Tampa, Florida, hosted the College Football Playoff National Championship.

The 2016–17 College Football Playoff was a single-elimination postseason tournament that determined the national champion of the 2016 NCAA Division I FBS football season. It was the third edition of the College Football Playoff (CFP) and involved the top four teams in the country as ranked by the College Football Playoff poll playing in two semifinals, with the winners of each advancing to the national championship game. Three of the four teams were conference champions: No. 1 Alabama from the Southeastern Conference, No. 2 Clemson from the Atlantic Coast Conference, and No. 4 Washington from the Pac-12 Conference. No. 3 Ohio State, from the Big Ten Conference, finished second in their division on a head-to-head tiebreaker with Penn State, who went on to win the conference championship.

The playoff bracket's semifinal games were held at the Peach Bowl and Fiesta Bowl on New Year's Eve, part of the season's slate of bowl games. In the Peach Bowl semifinal, Alabama defeated Washington, 24–7. The Fiesta Bowl semifinal saw Clemson shutout Ohio State, 31–0. As a result of their victories, Clemson and Alabama faced each other in the national championship game, a rematch of the previous season's championship game, held on January 9 in Tampa, Florida. Clemson won the rematch by a four-point margin to claim their first championship of the CFP era and their second national championship in school history, the first since 1981.

The three playoff games earned an average Nielsen rating of 12.7, with the championship scoring 15.4, a four percent upgrade from the previous edition. The playoff saw an increase in average audience and unique viewership with an average of 22.23 million viewers and a peak of 26.03 million. The championship became the eighth-most-watched cable broadcast in history and the most-viewed since the last national championship game.

== Bracket ==
Semifinals
December 31 – Peach Bowl Georgia Dome, Atlanta
1	Alabama	24
4	Washington	7
December 31 – Fiesta Bowl University of Phoenix Stadium, Glendale
2	Clemson	31
3	Ohio State	0

Championship
January 9 – Championship Raymond James Stadium, Tampa
1	Alabama	31
2	Clemson	35

== Selection and teams ==
The 2016–17 CFP selection committee was chaired by Texas Tech athletic director Kirby Hocutt. Its other members were Wisconsin athletic director Barry Alvarez, former Southern Miss head coach Jeff Bower, former Central Michigan athletic director Herb Deromedi, former NCAA executive vice president Tom Jernstedt, former head coach Bobby Johnson, Arkansas athletic director and former CFP selection committee chairman Jeff Long, Oregon athletic director Rob Mullens, Clemson athletic director Dan Radakovich, former United States secretary of state Condoleezza Rice, former USA Today reporter Steve Wieberg, and former college head coach Tyrone Willingham.

The first CFP poll of the season was released on November 1, 2016, with four conferences represented in the top six: No. 1 Alabama and No. 4 Texas A&M from the Southeastern Conference (SEC), No. 2 Clemson from the Atlantic Coast Conference (ACC), No. 3 Michigan and No. 6 Ohio State from the Big Ten Conference, and No. 5 Washington from the Pac-12 Conference. Texas A&M, ranked No. 7 in the AP Poll at the time, surprised some with their inclusion in the top four, though they dropped out after their upset loss to Mississippi State the following week. Louisville replaced the Aggies at No. 6 in the November 8 rankings. According to The Oxford Eagle, the following weekend's games contained "a lot of losing": No. 2 Clemson fell to Pittsburgh, No. 3 Michigan lost to Iowa, and No. 4 Washington was defeated by No. 20 USC. Further down the top ten, No. 8 Texas A&M suffered a loss to Ole Miss and Georgia upset No. 9 Auburn on the same day. As a result, Clemson fell to No. 4 and Washington to No. 6, while Ohio State jumped to No. 2 and Louisville rose one spot to No. 5. Louisville, following an upset loss to Houston, then fell out of the top six, and were replaced by Wisconsin. The regular season's final week saw Michigan drop from No. 3 to No. 5 following a double-overtime loss at No. 2 Ohio State.

The following week saw most conferences host their championship games. On December 2, No. 4 Washington defeated No. 8 Colorado to win the Pac-12 Championship, making them likely contenders for the playoff at 12–1. The following day, No. 1 Alabama's victory over No. 15 Florida in the SEC Championship led the Associated Press to predict a No. 1 seed in the playoffs for the Crimson Tide, while No. 3 Clemson beat No. 23 Virginia Tech by a touchdown to put themselves in prime position for the playoff as well. No. 7 Penn State, winners of a head-to-head tiebreaker in the Big Ten East Division over Ohio State, won the Big Ten Championship over No. 6 Wisconsin. In the final week of the Big 12's regular season, No. 9 Oklahoma clinched the conference title with a defeat of No. 10 Oklahoma State.

The final rankings, released on December 4, kept Alabama at No. 1 and elevated ACC champions Clemson to No. 2, with Ohio State at No. 3 and Washington staying at No. 4. Despite winning the Big Ten Championship, Penn State finished No. 5, one spot outside of the playoff, and was assigned to play No. 9 USC in the Rose Bowl. Michigan was ranked No. 6 and was chosen to face No. 11 Florida State in the Orange Bowl. Big 12 champions Oklahoma, ranked No. 7, were to play No. 14 Auburn in the Sugar Bowl.

2016 College Football Playoff rankings top six progression
No.	Week 9	Week 10	Week 11	Week 12	Week 13	Final
1	Alabama (8–0)	Alabama (9–0)	Alabama (10–0)	Alabama (11–0)	Alabama (12–0)	Alabama (13–0)
2	Clemson (8–0)	Clemson (9–0)	Ohio State (9–1)	Ohio State (10–1)	Ohio State (11–1)	Clemson (12–1)
3	Michigan (8–0)	Michigan (9–0)	Michigan (9–1)	Michigan (10–1)	Clemson (11–1)	Ohio State (11–1)
4	Texas A&M (7–1)	Washington (9–0)	Clemson (9–1)	Clemson (10–1)	Washington (11–1)	Washington (12–1)
5	Washington (8–0)	Ohio State (8–1)	Louisville (9–1)	Washington (10–1)	Michigan (10–2)	Penn State (11–2)
6	Ohio State (7–1)	Louisville (8–1)	Washington (9–1)	Wisconsin (9–2)	Wisconsin (10–2)	Michigan (10–2)

Key: Team increased ranking from previous week Team decreased ranking from previous week Team selected to College Football Playoff

== Playoff games ==
=== Semifinals ===
==== Peach Bowl ====
2016 Peach Bowl

Quarter	1	2	3	4	Total
No. 4 Washington	7	0	0	0	7
No. 1 Alabama	7	10	0	7	24

at Georgia Dome • Atlanta, Georgia

- Date: December 31, 2016
- Game time: 3:00 p.m. EST

The Peach Bowl semifinal paired No. 1 Alabama, defending national champions making their third consecutive CFP appearance, with No. 4 Washington, making their CFP debut. It was the fifth meeting between the teams and the first since the 1986 Sun Bowl. Washington opened the scoring with a touchdown pass from Jake Browning to Dante Pettis in the first quarter, and a touchdown rush by Bo Scarbrough three minutes later tied the score. Alabama took the lead on a field goal shortly into the second quarter and did not relinquish it, scoring two further touchdowns on an interception return by Ryan Anderson and another rush by Scarbrough, who won offensive Most Valuable Player. In all, ten of Alabama's twenty-four points came off of turnovers, and the interception return was their eleventh defensive touchdown of the season.

==== Fiesta Bowl ====
2016 Fiesta Bowl

Quarter	1	2	3	4	Total
No. 3 Ohio State	0	0	0	0	0
No. 2 Clemson	10	7	7	7	31

at University of Phoenix Stadium • Glendale, Arizona

- Date: December 31, 2016
- Game time: 5:00 p.m. MST

The Fiesta Bowl semifinal matched No. 2 Clemson and No. 3 Ohio State, who met for the third time and the first since the 2014 Orange Bowl. A 45-yard field goal by Clemson placekicker Greg Huegel was followed by a Deshaun Watson rushing touchdown in the game's opening quarter, and Clemson scored a touchdown in each of the remaining three quarters—a reception by C.J. Fuller and rushes by Watson and Wayne Gallman—to finish as Fiesta Bowl champions by a thirty-one point margin. Clemson head coach Dabo Swinney praised the defense's performance, including that of Clelin Ferrell, the game's defensive MVP, recorded three tackles for loss, including a sack. Clemson's 31–0 win marked the first shutout loss for Ohio State head coach Urban Meyer and the first such loss for the Buckeyes since 1993.

=== Championship game ===
2017 College Football Playoff National Championship

Quarter	1	2	3	4	Total
No. 2 Clemson	0	7	7	21	35
No. 1 Alabama	7	7	10	7	31

at Raymond James Stadium • Tampa, Florida

- Date: January 9, 2017
- Game time: 8:00 p.m. EST

A rematch of the National Championship Game a year prior, Alabama and Clemson met again to decide the national champion. Alabama was first to score on a touchdown rush by Bo Scarbrough after the Crimson Tide had gained possession following a turnover on downs by the Tigers. They doubled the lead on another Scarbrough rush in the second quarter, and the teams traded scores for the majority of the rest of the game. Clemson took their first lead with less than five minutes remaining on a 4-yard touchdown rush by Wayne Gallman. This was the first of three lead changes in the fourth quarter, the last of which came on a touchdown pass from Watson to Hunter Renfrow with one second remaining. The Associated Press remarked that the game-winning two-yard strike was "one of the easiest throws [Watson] had to make all night".

== Aftermath ==
Clemson's win in the title game gave them their first national championship since 1981. The Tigers finished the season with a record of 14–1. The win marked Clemson's first against a No. 1-ranked team, and it ended Alabama's winning streak of twenty-six games. Swinney said after the conclusion of the national championship that it had been "one of the greatest games of all time".

The national championship was the most-viewed cable telecast since the Alabama–Clemson championship the year prior, and it was the eighth-most-watched cable broadcast in history. The average viewership across the entire playoff was 22.23 million viewers, with the championship receiving a total viewership of 26.03 million. The championship's Nielsen rating of 15.4 represented a 4% year-over-year increase, and the game broke records for average audience and unique viewers. The three playoff games averaged a 12.7 rating and increases of at least 25% in streaming audience and unique viewers.
