= 2016 Clemson Tigers football team =

American college football season

2016 Clemson Tigers football

Consensus national champion ACC champion ACC Atlantic Division co-champion Fiesta Bowl champion

ACC Championship, W 42–35 vs. Virginia Tech

Fiesta Bowl (CFP semifinal), W 31–0 vs. Ohio State CFP National Championship, W 35–31 vs. Alabama
- Conference: Atlantic Coast Conference
- Atlantic Division

Ranking
- Coaches: No. 1
- AP: No. 1
- Record: 14–1 (7–1 ACC)
- Head coach: Dabo Swinney (8th full, 9th overall season)
- Co-offensive coordinators: Tony Elliott (2nd season); Jeff Scott (2nd season)
- Offensive scheme: Spread
- Defensive coordinator: Brent Venables (5th season)
- Base defense: 4–3
- Home stadium: Memorial Stadium

2016 Atlantic Coast Conference football standings
	Conf.			Overall
Team	W		L	W		L
Atlantic Division
No. 1 Clemson xy$#	7	–	1	14	–	1
No. 21 Louisville x	7	–	1	9	–	4
No. 8 Florida State	5	–	3	10	–	3
NC State	3	–	5	7	–	6
Wake Forest	3	–	5	7	–	6
Boston College	2	–	6	7	–	6
Syracuse	2	–	6	4	–	8
Coastal Division
No. 16 Virginia Tech xy	6	–	2	10	–	4
North Carolina	5	–	3	8	–	5
No. 20 Miami (FL)	5	–	3	9	–	4
Pittsburgh	5	–	3	8	–	5
Georgia Tech	4	–	4	9	–	4
Duke	1	–	7	4	–	8
Virginia	1	–	7	2	–	10
Championship: Clemson 42, Virginia Tech 35
# – College Football Playoff champion; $ – Conference champion; x – Division champion/co-champions; y – Championship game participant; Rankings from AP Poll

The 2016 Clemson Tigers football team represented Clemson University in the 2016 NCAA Division I FBS football season. The Tigers were led by head coach Dabo Swinney in his eighth full year and ninth overall since taking over midway through the 2008 season. They played their home games at Memorial Stadium, also known as "Death Valley", and competed in the Atlantic Division of the Atlantic Coast Conference. The Tigers entered the 2016 season as the defending national runners-up after a 14–1 season that ended with a loss to Alabama in the 2016 College Football Playoff National Championship.

After finishing the regular season with a record of 11–1, and then beating Coastal Division champion Virginia Tech in the 2016 ACC Championship game, the second-ranked Tigers advanced to the 2016 College Football Playoff semifinal played at the Fiesta Bowl, where they defeated third-ranked Ohio State 31–0. Clemson and Alabama met in the 2017 CFP National Championship in college football's first ever national championship game rematch. Clemson won by a score of 35 to 31, winning their first consensus national championship since 1981. Clemson subsequently finished first of the rankings in both the AP Poll and the Coaches Poll.

The Clemson offense was led by junior quarterback Deshaun Watson, who led the ACC with 4,593 passing yards and 41 passing touchdowns. Watson finished second in voting for the Heisman Trophy behind Louisville's Lamar Jackson and was awarded the Davey O'Brien Award, Johnny Unitas Golden Arm Award, and Manning Award. Wide receiver Mike Williams, tight end Jordan Leggett, and offensive linemen Mitch Hyatt, Tyrone Crowder, and Jay Guillermo were named first-team All-ACC on offense. Defensive first-team all-conference selections were defensive tackle Carlos Watkins, linebacker Ben Boulware, and defensive backs Cordrea Tankersley and Jadar Johnson.

== Offseason ==
=== Players lost ===
- CB Mackensie Alexander - Declared for NFL Draft
- RB Zach Brooks
- DT Kevin Dodd
- S T. J. Green - Declared for NFL Draft
- LB B. J. Goodson
- S Jayron Kearse
- DE Shaq Lawson - Declared for NFL Draft
- WR Charone Peake
- DT D. J. Reader

== Schedule ==
Clemson announced their schedule for the 2016 season on January 26, 2016. The Tigers' schedule consisted of 7 home games and 5 away games. Clemson hosted conference opponents Louisville, NC State, Syracuse, and Pitt and travel to Florida State, Boston College, Wake Forest, and Georgia Tech. The Tigers hosted out-of-conference opponents Troy, South Carolina State and South Carolina and travelled to out-of-conference opponent Auburn. Clemson's out-of-conference opponents represented the Sun Belt, MEAC, and SEC conferences, respectively.

Date	Time	Opponent	Rank	Site	TV	Result	Attendance
September 3	9:00 p.m.	at Auburn*	No. 2	Jordan–Hare Stadium; Auburn, AL (rivalry)	ESPN	W 19–13	87,451
September 10	12:30 p.m.	Troy*	No. 2	Memorial Stadium; Clemson, SC	ACCN	W 30–24	78,532
September 17	Noon	South Carolina State*	No. 5	Memorial Stadium; Clemson, SC	ACCRSN	W 59–0	79,590
September 22	7:30 p.m.	at Georgia Tech	No. 5	Bobby Dodd Stadium; Atlanta, GA (rivalry)	ESPN	W 26–7	53,932
October 1	8:00 p.m.	No. 3 Louisville	No. 5	Memorial Stadium; Clemson, SC (College GameDay)	ABC	W 42–36	83,362
October 7	7:30 p.m.	at Boston College	No. 3	Alumni Stadium; Chestnut Hill, MA (O'Rourke–McFadden Trophy)	ESPN	W 56–10	44,500
October 15	Noon	NC State^{†}	No. 3	Memorial Stadium; Clemson, SC (Textile Bowl)	ABC	W 24–17 ^{OT}	81,200
October 29	8:00 p.m.	at No. 12 Florida State	No. 3	Doak Campbell Stadium; Tallahassee, FL (rivalry)	ABC	W 37–34	78,025
November 5	3:30 p.m.	Syracuse	No. 2	Memorial Stadium; Clemson, SC	ABC/ESPN2	W 54–0	80,609
November 12	3:30 p.m.	Pittsburgh	No. 2	Memorial Stadium; Clemson, SC	ABC	L 42–43	81,048
November 19	7:00 p.m.	at Wake Forest	No. 4	BB&T Field; Winston-Salem, NC	ESPN	W 35–13	31,512
November 26	7:30 p.m.	South Carolina*	No. 4	Memorial Stadium; Clemson, SC (Palmetto Bowl)	ESPN	W 56–7	81,542
December 3	8:00 p.m.	vs. No. 23 Virginia Tech	No. 3	Camping World Stadium; Orlando, FL (ACC Championship Game)	ABC	W 42–35	50,628
December 31	7:00 p.m.	vs. No. 3 Ohio State*	No. 2	University of Phoenix Stadium; Glendale, AZ (Fiesta Bowl–CFP Semifinal) (College GameDay)	ESPN	W 31–0	71,279
January 9, 2017	8:30 p.m.	vs. No. 1 Alabama*	No. 2	Raymond James Stadium; Tampa, FL (CFP National Championship / rivalry) (College GameDay)	ESPN	W 35–31	74,512
*Non-conference game; ^{†}Homecoming; Rankings from AP Poll and CFP Rankings after November 1 released prior to game; All times are in Eastern time

=== Rankings ===
Ranking movements Legend: ██ Increase in ranking ██ Decrease in ranking ( ) = First-place votes
	Week																
Poll	Pre	1	2	3	4	5	6	7	8	9	10	11	12	13	14	15	Final
AP	2 (16)	2 (2)	5	5	5	3 (1)	3 (2)	4	3	3	3	3	5	4	3	3	1 (60)
Coaches	2 (7)	2 (2)	3 (1)	3 (1)	3 (1)	3 (2)	3 (1)	3 (1)	3 (1)	3 (1)	2 (2)	2	4	3	3	3	1 (60)
CFP	Not released									2	2	2	4	4	3	2	Not released

== Personnel ==
=== Coaching staff ===
Head coach Dabo Swinney added two new additions to the Tigers' coaching staff in late March 2016 with Mickey Conn and Kyle Richardson. Swinney hired former Grayson (GA) head coach Mickey Conn as a defensive analyst for the Tigers along with former Northwestern (SC) head coach Kyle Richardson, who will serve as the team's offensive analyst. Both coaches were extremely successful at their former high schools with a combined win–loss record of 195–61 and numerous championship titles.

Name	Position	CU Years	Alma mater
Dabo Swinney	Head Coach	14th	Alabama (1993)
Dan Brooks	Associate head coach / Defensive tackles Coach	8th	Western Carolina (1976)
Danny Pearman	Assistant Head Coach / special teams coordinator / tight ends coach	9th	Clemson (1987)
Brent Venables	Defensive Coordinator / linebackers coach	5th	Kansas State (1992)
Marion Hobby	Co-defensive Coordinator / Defensive Ends Coach	7th	Tennessee (1995)
Jeff Scott	Co-offensive Coordinator / wide receivers coach	9th	Clemson (2003)
Tony Elliott	Co-offensive Coordinator / running backs Coach	6th	Clemson (2002)
Robbie Caldwell	Offensive Linemen Coach	6th	Furman (1977)
Mike Reed	Defensive backs coach	4th	Boston College (1994)
Brandon Streeter	Recruiting coordinator / quarterbacks Coach	3rd	Clemson (1999)
Joey Batson	Director of strength and conditioning	20th	Newberry College (1981)
Mickey Conn	Defensive Analyst	1st	Alabama (1995)
Kyle Richardson	Offensive Analyst	1st	Appalachian State (2001)
Zac Alley	Graduate assistant	6th	Clemson University (2014)

=== Roster ===
2016 Clemson Tigers Football
Quarterback: 2 Kelly Bryant – sophomore (6'3, 215); 4 Deshaun Watson – junior (6'2, 210); 6 Zerrick Cooper – freshman (6'4, 205); 10 Tucker Israel – (redshirt) freshman (5'11, 195); 12 Nick Schuessler – (redshirt) senior (6'3, 200); 18 James Barnes – (redshirt) freshman (6'1, 175); Running back: 9 Wayne Gallman – (redshirt) junior (6'1, 215); 21 Darien Rencher – freshman (5'8, 190); 22 Tyshon Dye – (redshirt) junior (6'0, 215); 26 Adam Choice – (redshirt) sophomore (5'9, 215); 27 C.J. Fuller – (redshirt) sophomore (5'10, 210); 28 Tavien Feaster – freshman (6'0, 205); Wide receiver: 1 Trevion Thompson – (redshirt) sophomore (6'2, 200); 3 Artavis Scott – junior (5'11, 190); 7 Mike Williams – (redshirt) junior (6'4, 220); 8 Deon Cain – sophomore (6'2, 200); 11 Shadell Bell – (redshirt) freshman (6'2, 200); 13 Hunter Renfrow – (redshirt) sophomore (5'10, 175) (+P); 14 Diondre Overton – freshman (6'5, 195); 17 Cornell Powell – freshman (6'1, 200); 18 T. J. Chase – freshman (6'2, 185); 34 Ray-Ray McCloud – sophomore (5'10, 180); 81 Kanyon Tuttle – (redshirt) freshman (5'11, 170); 82 Adrien Dunn – (redshirt) junior (5'7, 175); 83 Carter Groomes – freshman (5'9, 180); 85 Seth Ryan – (redshirt) junior (6'0, 175); 86 Ty Thomason – (redshirt) freshman (5'10, 210); 88 Sean Mac Lain – senior (6'4, 210); Tight end: 16 Jordan Leggett – senior (6'5, 255); 25 J.C. Chalk – freshman (6'4, 230); 44 Garrett Williams – sophomore (6'2, 235); 80 Milan Richard – (redshirt) sophomore (6'2, 250); 83 Jesse Fisher – (redshirt) freshman (6'4, 215); 84 Cannon Smith – (redshirt) sophomore (6'5, 260); 87 D.J. Greenlee – (redshirt) junior (6'2, 245); Placekicker: 39 Christian Groomes – (redshirt) sophomore (5'10, 185) (+P); 47 Alex Spence – (redshirt) sophomore (6'1, 190); 92 Greg Huegel – (redshirt) sophomore (5'11, 185)	Offensive lineman: 50 Justin Falcinelli - OL – (redshirt) sophomore (6'3, 305); 51 Taylor Hearn - OL – (redshirt) sophomore (6'5, 330); 55 Tyrone Crowder - OG – (redshirt) junior (6'2, 330); 57 Jay Guillermo - OL – (redshirt) senior (6'3, 325); 59 Gage Cervenka - OL – (redshirt) freshman (6'3, 305); 60 Kelby Bevelle - OL – (redshirt) junior (6'4, 260); 62 Cade Stewart - OL – freshman (6'4, 310); 63 Jake Fruhmorgen - OT – sophomore (6'6, 280); 64 Pat Godfrey - OL – (redshirt) freshman (6'3, 260); 69 Maverick Morris - OG – (redshirt) junior (6'5, 300); 70 Seth Penner - OG – (redshirt) freshman (6'3, 320); 71 Noah Green - OL – (redshirt) freshman (6'5, 285); 72 Logan Tisch - OL – (redshirt) freshman (6'2, 290); 73 Tremayne Anchrum - OL – freshman (6'3, 290); 74 John Simpson - OL – freshman (6'4, 290); 75 Mitch Hyatt - OT – sophomore (6'5, 295); 76 Sean Pollard - OL – freshman (6'5, 295); 77 Zach Giella - C – (redshirt) freshman (6'5, 295); 78 Chandler Reeves - OL – freshman (6'6, 270); 79 Matthew Ryan - C – freshman (6'2, 320); Defensive lineman: 7 Lasamuel Davis – freshman (6'4, 215); 22 Xavier Kelly - DE – freshman (6'5, 255); 40 Jaquarius Brice - DE – (redshirt) junior (6'1, 215); 42 Christian Wilkins - DT – sophomore (6'4, 315); 45 Chris Register - DE – (redshirt) sophomore (6'2, 245); 49 Richard Yeargin - DE – (redshirt) sophomore (6'3, 255); 50 Jabril Robinson - DT – (redshirt) sophomore (6'2, 280); 56 Scott Pagano - DT – (redshirt) junior (6'3, 295); 61 Kaleb Bevelle - DE – (redshirt) junior (6'4, 255); 67 Albert Huggins - DT – sophomore (6'4, 295); 90 Dexter Lawrence - DT – freshman (6'5, 340); 91 Austin Bryant - DE – sophomore (6'4, 265); 92 Nyles Pinckney - DT – freshman (6'3, 300); 93 Sterling Johnson - DE – (redshirt) freshman (6'4, 295); 94 Carlos Watkins - DT – (redshirt) senior (6'3, 300); 99 Clelin Ferrell - DE – (redshirt) freshman (6'5, 255); Punter: 32 Andy Teasdall – (redshirt) senior (5'11, 190); 48 Will Spiers – freshman (6'5, 220); 96 Michael Batson – (redshirt) freshman (5'10, 200); 97 Carson King – (redshirt) freshman (6'0, 215)	Linebacker: 5 Shaq Smith – freshman (6'3, 240); 6 Dorian O'Daniel – (redshirt) junior (6'1, 215); 10 Ben Boulware – senior (5'11, 240); 30 Jalen Williams – sophomore (5'9, 225); 33 J.D. Davis – sophomore (6'1, 225); 34 Kendall Joseph – (redshirt) sophomore (6'0, 230); 36 Judah Davis – sophomore (6'1, 225); 43 Chad Smith – (redshirt) freshman (6'4, 235); 46 Jarvis Magwood – (redshirt) sophomore (6'0, 215); 47 James Skalski – freshman (6'2, 225); 52 Connor Prevost – (redshirt) junior (6'0, 220); 53 Regan Upshaw – freshman (6'2, 220); 57 Tre Lamar – freshman (6'4, 240); 59 Connor Sekas – (redshirt) sophomore (6'2, 220); Defensive back: 1 Trayvon Mullen - DB – freshman (6'3, 175); 2 Mark Fields - CB – sophomore (5'10, 195); 9 Brian Dawkins Jr. - DB – freshman (5'9, 175); 11 Isaiah Simmons - DB – freshman (6'4, 215); 12 K'Von Wallace - DB – freshman (6'1, 190); 14 Denzel Johnson - CB – (redshirt) freshman (6'0, 200); 15 Korrin Wiggins - S – (redshirt) junior (6'0, 200); 18 Jadar Johnson - S – senior (6'1, 205); 19 Tanner Muse - S – (redshirt) freshman (6'2, 230); 21 Adrian Baker - CB – (redshirt) junior (6'0, 180); 23 Van Smith - S – sophomore (6'0, 190); 24 Nolan Turner - DB – freshman (6'2, 190); 25 Cordrea Tankersley - CB – senior (6'1, 195); 29 Marcus Edmond - CB – (redshirt) junior (6'0, 170); 31 Ryan Carter - CB – (redshirt) junior (5'9, 175); 32 Kyle Cote - S – (redshirt) freshman (5'10, 170); 37 Austin Jackson - S – sophomore (6'2, 200); 37 Cameron Scott - S – (redshirt) sophomore (5'10, 205); 38 Amir Trapp - CB – (redshirt) freshman (5'8, 155); 40 Hall Morton - S – freshman (5'8, 160); Long snappers: 52 Austin Spence – (redshirt) freshman (6'2, 195); 58 Patrick Phibbs – (redshirt) freshman (6'3, 200); 59 Bradley Tatko – (redshirt) junior (6'0, 225); 62 David Estes – (redshirt) senior (6'1, 200)

=== Recruiting class ===
College recruiting (2016)
Name	Hometown	School	Height	Weight	40^{‡}	Commit date
Dexter Lawrence; DT	Wake Forest, North Carolina	Wake Forest H.S.	6 ft 4 in (1.93 m)	327 lb (148 kg)	—	Dec 14, 2015
Dexter Lawrence; DT	Recruit ratings: Scout: Rivals: 247Sports: ESPN:					
Tre Lamar; LB	Roswell, Georgia	Roswell H.S.	6 ft 4 in (1.93 m)	240 lb (110 kg)	—	Jul 17, 2015
Tre Lamar; LB	Recruit ratings: Scout: Rivals: 247Sports: ESPN:					
Rahshaun Smith; LB	Bradenton, Florida	IMG Academy	6 ft 3 in (1.91 m)	239 lb (108 kg)	—	Jan 2, 2016
Rahshaun Smith; LB	Recruit ratings: Scout: Rivals: 247Sports: ESPN:					
Tavien Feaster; RB	Spartanburg, South Carolina	Spartanburg H.S.	5 ft 11 in (1.80 m)	196 lb (89 kg)	4.40	Feb 4, 2015
Tavien Feaster; RB	Recruit ratings: Scout: Rivals: 247Sports: ESPN:					
Trayvon Mullen; DB	Coconut Creek, Florida	Coconut Creek H.S.	6 ft 2 in (1.88 m)	170 lb (77 kg)	—	Feb 3, 2016
Trayvon Mullen; DB	Recruit ratings: Scout: Rivals: 247Sports: ESPN:					
Xavier Kelly; DE	Wichita, Kansas	East H.S.	6 ft 4.5 in (1.94 m)	240 lb (110 kg)	—	Jul 24, 2015
Xavier Kelly; DE	Recruit ratings: Scout: Rivals: 247Sports: ESPN:					
Cornell Powell; WR	Greenville, North Carolina	J.H. Rose H.S.	6 ft 2 in (1.88 m)	200 lb (91 kg)	4.45	Feb 4, 2015
Cornell Powell; WR	Recruit ratings: Scout: Rivals: 247Sports: ESPN:					
Nyles Pinckney; DT	Seabrook, South Carolina	Whale Branch H.S.	6 ft 1 in (1.85 m)	295 lb (134 kg)	—	Aug 21, 2015
Nyles Pinckney; DT	Recruit ratings: Scout: Rivals: 247Sports: ESPN:					
John Simpson; OG	North Charleston, South Carolina	Fort Dorchester H.S.	6 ft 4 in (1.93 m)	290 lb (130 kg)	—	Feb 3, 2016
John Simpson; OG	Recruit ratings: Scout: Rivals: 247Sports: ESPN:					
Diondre Overton; WR	Greensboro, North Carolina	Page H.S.	6 ft 5 in (1.96 m)	200 lb (91 kg)	—	Jan 3, 2016
Diondre Overton; WR	Recruit ratings: Scout: Rivals: 247Sports: ESPN:					
Tavares Chase; WR	Plant City, Florida	Plant City H.S.	6 ft 2 in (1.88 m)	167 lb (76 kg)	—	Jan 31, 2015
Tavares Chase; WR	Recruit ratings: Scout: Rivals: 247Sports: ESPN:					
Zerrick Cooper; QB	Jonesboro, Georgia	Jonesboro H.S.	6 ft 4 in (1.93 m)	206 lb (93 kg)	—	Oct 11, 2015
Zerrick Cooper; QB	Recruit ratings: Scout: Rivals: 247Sports: ESPN:					
Sean Pollard; OL	Southern Pines, North Carolina	Pinecrest H.S.	6 ft 6 in (1.98 m)	305 lb (138 kg)	—	Dec 12, 2014
Sean Pollard; OL	Recruit ratings: Scout: Rivals: 247Sports: ESPN:					
Isaiah Simmons; DB	Olathe, Kansas	Olathe North H.S.	6 ft 3 in (1.91 m)	205 lb (93 kg)	—	Feb 3, 2016
Isaiah Simmons; DB	Recruit ratings: Scout: Rivals: 247Sports: ESPN:					
Tremayne Anchrum; OG	Powder Springs, Georgia	McEachern H.S.	6 ft 3 in (1.91 m)	268 lb (122 kg)	—	Nov 19, 2015
Tremayne Anchrum; OG	Recruit ratings: Scout: Rivals: 247Sports: ESPN:					
J.C. Chalk; TE	Argyle, Texas	Argyle H.S.	6 ft 4 in (1.93 m)	240 lb (110 kg)	—	Nov 6, 2014
J.C. Chalk; TE	Recruit ratings: Scout: Rivals: 247Sports: ESPN:					
James Skalski; LB	Newnan, Georgia	Northgate H.S.	6 ft 1 in (1.85 m)	225 lb (102 kg)	—	Feb 4, 2015
James Skalski; LB	Recruit ratings: Scout: Rivals: 247Sports: ESPN:					
Chandler Reeves; OT	McDonough, Georgia	Eagles Landing Christian H.S.	6 ft 6 in (1.98 m)	255 lb (116 kg)	—	Jun 19, 2015
Chandler Reeves; OT	Recruit ratings: Scout: Rivals: 247Sports: ESPN:					
K'Von Wallace; DB	Highland Springs, Virginia	Highland Springs H.S.	6 ft 0 in (1.83 m)	172 lb (78 kg)	—	Feb 3, 2016
K'Von Wallace; DB	Recruit ratings: Scout: Rivals: 247Sports: ESPN:					
Overall recruit ranking: Scout: 14 Rivals: 5 247Sports: 10 ESPN: 8
‡ Refers to 40-yard dash; Note: In many cases, Scout, Rivals, 247Sports, On3, and ESPN may conflict in their listings of height, weight and 40 time.; In these cases, the average was taken. ESPN grades are on a 100-point scale.; Sources: "Clemson Football Commitments". Rivals.; "2016 Team Ranking". Rivals.com.

== Game summaries ==
=== Auburn ===
No. 2 Clemson Tigers at Auburn Tigers − Game summary

Quarter	1	2	3	4	Total
No. 2 Clemson	0	10	3	6	19
Auburn	0	3	0	10	13

at Jordan–Hare Stadium • Auburn, AL

- Date: September 3, 2016
- Game time: 8:11 p.m.
- Game weather: Temperature: 79° • Wind: E 5 mph • Weather: Clear Skies
- Game attendance: 87,451
- Referee: Jeff Heaser
- TV announcers (ESPN): Brent Musburger (play-by-play), Jesse Palmer (analyst), Kaylee Hartung (sideline reporter)

Game information

Second quarter

- (12:58) AUB FG - Daniel Carlson: 53 yards
- (07:34) CLEM TD - Wayne Gallman 1 yard run (Greg Huegel PAT).
- (00:07) CLEM FG - Greg Huegel: 30 yards

Third quarter

- (10:36) CLEM FG - Greg Huegel 40 yards

Fourth quarter

- (13:46) AUB FG - Daniel Carlson: 32 yards
- (09:59) CLEM TD - Deshaun Watson 16 yard pass to Hunter Renfrow (Greg Huegel PAT failed)
- (03:22) AUB TD - Kerryon Johnson 9 yard run (Daniel Carlson PAT)

Top passers

- CLEM - Deshaun Watson 19-34, 248 yards, 1 TD, 1 INT
- AUB - Sean White 10-21, 140 yards, 1 INT

Top rushers

- CLEM - Wayne Gallman 30 carries, 123 yards, 1 TD
- AUB - Kerryon Johnson 23 carries, 94 yards, 1 TD

Top Receiving

- CLEM - Mike Williams 9 receptions, 174 yards
- AUB - Marcus Davis 5 receptions, 56 yards

Clemson began the year ranked second in the AP Poll and traveled to unranked historic rival Auburn to begin the season. Clemson survived an early scare and won the game 19–13.

Clemson received the opening kickoff and got as far as the Auburn 32 yard line but failed to convert on 4th and 5. Both teams struggled to move the ball for the first quarter. Auburn opened the scoring early in the second quarter with a 53-yard field goal by Daniel Carlson. Clemson responded with a 13-play, 84-yard drive that ended with a one-yard touchdown run by Wayne Gallman. Clemson got the ball back with 3:00 left in the half and extended their lead with a 30-yard field goal by Greg Huegel. The score was 10–3 at halftime.

After forcing an Auburn three-and-out to open the second half, Clemson again kicked a field goal, this one from 40-yards out to bring the score to 13–3 Clemson. After the teams traded interceptions and another set of unsuccessful downs, Auburn kicked a 32-yard field goal early in the fourth quarter. Clemson responded with a 75-yard drive that ended with a 16-yard touchdown pass from Deshaun Watson to Hunter Renfrow, but Greg Heugel's extra point attempt missed off the upright, after which the score was 19–6 with 9:59 left in the game. Auburn's Kerryon Johnson scored a nine-yard touchdown run with 3:22 left to pull within 6 points. Clemson drove to the Auburn 17 yard line, but elected to go for it on 4th and 4 with 40 seconds left in the game rather than kick a field goal to potentially go up by 9 points. The fourth down attempt failed, and Auburn had a chance to win the game with their final drive. Head coach Dabo Swinney explained the decision: "We just didn't want to take a shot at the field goal right there. We felt like as good as we had played defensively, with them having no timeouts, it was going to be very difficult for them to go score." Auburn advanced to the Clemson 40 yard line, but a series of Hail Mary passes came up incomplete, and the game was over. Deshaun Watson finished with 248 yards in the game, and wide receiver Mike Williams finished with 174 yards.

=== Troy ===
Troy Trojans at No. 2 Clemson Tigers − Game summary

Quarter	1	2	3	4	Total
Troy	3	7	0	14	24
No. 2 Clemson	3	10	0	17	30

at Memorial Stadium • Clemson, SC

- Date: September 10, 2016
- Game time: 12:30 p.m.
- Game weather: Temperature: 90° • Wind: WSW 5 mph • Weather: Sunny
- Game attendance: 78,532
- Referee: Danny Short
- TV announcers (ACCN): Tom Werme (Play-by-Play), Dave Archer (Color Analyst), Roddy Jones (Sideline Reporter)

Game information

First quarter

- (10:22) TROY FG - Ryan Kay: 39 yards
- (07:28) CLEM FG - Greg Huegel: 26 yards

Second quarter

- (10:06) CLEM TD - Deshaun Watson 35 yard pass to Hunter Renfrow (Greg Huegel PAT).
- (7:52) TROY TD - Jabir Frye 66 yard run (Ryan Kay PAT).
- (02:45) CLEM FG - Greg Huegel: 32 yards

Fourth quarter

- (13:50) CLEM TD - Deshaun Watson 1 yard pass to Christian Wilkins (Greg Huegel PAT).
- (10:00) CLEM TD - Deshaun Watson 23 yard pass to Deion Cain (Greg Huegel PAT).
- (04:59) TROY TD - Brandon Silvers 2 yard pass to Deondre Douglas (Ryan Kay PAT).
- (02:25) CLEM FG - Greg Huegel: 34 yards
- (00:44) TROY TD - Brandon Silvers 1 yard pass to Deondre Douglas (Ryan Kay PAT).

Top passers

- CLEM - Deshaun Watson 27-53, 292 yards, 3 TD, 2 INT
- TROY - Brandon Silvers 24-42, 233 yards, 2 TD, 2 INT

Top rushers

- CLEM - Deshaun Watson 10 carries, 55 yards
- TROY - Jabir Frye 4 carries, 61 yards

Top Receiving

- CLEM - Ray-Ray McCloud 7 receptions, 86 yards
- TROY - Deondre Douglas 11 receptions, 93 yards, 2 TD

Clemson returned home for their home opener against Troy of the Sun Belt Conference. The Tigers had another surprisingly close game against an unranked opponent, pulling away late for a 30–24 win.

After the two teams each went three-and-out on their first two drives, Troy opened the scoring with a 39-yard field goal. Clemson tied the game with a 26-yard field goal on the following drive. Early in the second quarter, Clemson scored the game's first touchdown with a Deshaun Watson 35-yard pass to Hunter Renfrow. Troy tied the game on the next drive with a 66-yard touchdown run by Jabir Frye. Later in the quarter, Clemson kicked a 32-yard field goal to take a 13–10 lead. On Troy's next drive, the Trojans were forced to punt, and Clemson's Ray-Ray McCloud appeared to return the punt 75 yards for a touchdown. The play was reviewed, however, and it was revealed that McCloud celebrated too early and released the ball for a fumble just before the goal line. Troy was awarded the ball at the 20 yard line and advanced into Clemson territory, but missed a 48-yard field goal attempt just before the half.

The third quarter featured no points scored, with seven punts by the two teams and a Deshaun Watson interception. Early in the fourth quarter, Clemson capped off an 81-yard drive with a one-yard touchdown pass from Watson to defensive end Christian Wilkins. On the next drive, Clemson scored another touchdown via a 23-yard pass from Watson to Deon Cain to push the score to 27–10 Clemson. With 4:59 left in the game, Troy scored another touchdown via a two-yard pass from Brandon Silvers to Deondre Douglas. Clemson kicked a field goal on the following drive. With 44 seconds left, Troy pulled within 6 points by scoring another touchdown with another Silvers to Douglas pass. Troy's onside kick attempt failed, and Clemson drained the clock to win the game. Deshaun Watson finished with 292 yards, three touchdowns, and two interceptions in the game.

=== South Carolina State ===
South Carolina State Bulldogs at No. 5 Clemson Tigers − Game summary

Quarter	1	2	3	4	Total
South Carolina State	0	0	0	0	0
No. 5 Clemson	31	14	14	0	59

at Memorial Stadium • Clemson, SC

- Date: September 17, 2016
- Game time: 12:05 p.m.
- Game weather: Temperature: 73° • Wind: W 7 mph • Weather: Mostly sunny
- Game attendance: 79,590
- Referee: Stuart Mullins
- TV announcers (ACCRSN): Wes Durham (Play-by-Play), James Bates (Color Analyst), Jenn Hildreth (Sideline Reporter)

Game information

First quarter

- (11:33) CLEM TD - Deshaun Watson 7 yard pass to Ray-Ray McCloud (Greg Hugel PAT).
- (05:20) CLEM TD - Wayne Gallman 3 yard run (Greg Hugel PAT).
- (05:20) CLEM TD - Denzel Johnson 0 yard fumble recovery (Greg Hugel PAT).
- (03:18) CLEM TD - Nick Schuessler 45 yard pass to Diondre Overton (Greg Hugel PAT).
- (1:39) CLEM FG - Greg Hugel: 26 yards

Second quarter

- (13:41) CLEM TD - Deshaun Watson 36 yard pass to Ray-Ray McCloud (Greg Hugel PAT).
- (09:56) CLEM TD - Deshaun Watson 16 yard pass to Deon Cain (Greg Hugel PAT).

Third quarter

- (06:29) CLEM TD - Tavien Feaster 4 yard run (Greg Hugel PAT).
- (00:55) CLEM TD - Kelly Bryant 7 yard pass to Trevion Thompson (Greg Hugel PAT).

Fourth quarter

Top passers

- CLEM - Deshaun Watson 12-15, 152 yards, 3 TD
- SC STATE - Caleb York 8-22, 54 yards, 1 INT

Top rushers

- CLEM - Tavien Feaster 12 carries, 83 yards, 1 TD
- SC STATE - Labron Morris 12 carries, 41 yards

Top Receiving

- CLEM - Ray-Ray McCloud 4 receptions, 60 yards, 2 TD
- SC STATE - Lynard Jamison 3 receptions, 33 yards

For their third game of the year, Clemson hosted in-state FCS foe South Carolina State. Clemson won in a predictable blow-out, 59–0. The two teams' head coaches agreed at halftime to shorten the quarters in the second half to 12 minutes each from the usual 15 minutes.

Clemson scored on each of their first six drives in the first half, and had a special teams score as well. On the opening drive, Deshaun Watson completed a seven-yard touchdown pass to Ray-Ray McCloud. On the second drive, running back Wayne Gallman ran for a three-yard score. On the ensuing kickoff, the SC State return man fielded the ball in the endzone, and flipped the ball toward the referee without ever signalling for a fair catch or kneeling with the ball for a touchback. Clemson jumped on the ball in the endzone for the touchdown. After a 45-yard touchdown pass from backup quarterback Nick Schuessler to Diondre Overton, a Bulldog interception, and a Tiger field goal, Clemson was up 31–0 at the end of the first quarter. Deshaun Watson added two touchdown passes in the second quarter, and the score was 45–0 at halftime. In shortened quarters in the second half, Clemson added two more touchdowns via a run by Tavien Feaster and a pass from Kelly Bryant to Trevion Thompson. With the 59–0 win, Clemson improved to 31–0 all-time against FCS opponents.

=== At Georgia Tech ===
No. 5 Clemson Tigers at Georgia Tech Yellow Jackets − Game summary

Quarter	1	2	3	4	Total
No. 5 Clemson	14	9	0	3	26
Georgia Tech	0	0	0	7	7

at Bobby Dodd Stadium • Atlanta, GA

- Date: September 22, 2016
- Game time: 7:23 p.m.
- Game weather: Temperature: 84° • Wind: NNW 5 mph • Weather: Clear
- Game attendance: 53,932
- Referee: Duane Heydt
- TV announcers (ESPN): David Flemming (Play-by-Play), Jesse Palmer (Color Analyst), Laura Rutledge (sideline reporter)

Game information

First quarter

- (11:25) CLEM TD - Deshaun Watson 4 yard pass to Mike Williams (Greg Hugel PAT).
- (02:26) CLEM TD - Wayne Gallman 1 yard run (Greg Hugel PAT).

Second quarter

- (02:00) CLEM SAFETY
- (00:04) CLEM TD - Deshaun Watson 9 yard pass to Jordan Leggett (Greg Hugel PAT).

Third quarter Fourth quarter

- (13:21) GT TD - D. Mills 2 yard run (H Butker PAT).
- (09:57) CLEM FG - Greg Hugel: 47 yards.

Top passers

- CLEM - Deshaun Watson 32-48, 304 yards, 2 TD, 1 INT
- GT - Justin Thomas 4-13, 29 yards

Top rushers

- CLEM - Wayne Gallman 17 carries, 59 yards, 1 TD
- GT - D. Mills, 16 carres, 75 yards, 1 TD

Top Receiving

- CLEM - Ray-Ray McCloud 8 receptions, 101 yards
- GT - B. Stewart 1 reception 26 yards

Clemson next traveled to Atlanta for a Thursday night game against Georgia Tech in their conference opener. Clemson rolled early and came away with a convincing 26–7 win.

Clemson received the opening kickoff and scored in their opening drive via a four-yard touchdown pass from Deshaun Watson to Mike Williams. Clemson's next drive ended in a missed 27-yard field goal by Greg Heugel, but the Tigers scored on the following drive with a one-yard run by Wayne Gallman. Late in the second quarter, Watson threw an interception in Georgia Tech's endzone, but the Georgia Tech defender fumbled the ball and his teammate fell on it for a Clemson safety. The Tigers then marched down the field in the final minutes of the half and scored another touchdown, a nine-yard pass from Watson to Jordan Leggett, to bring the score to 23–0 at halftime. The second half was mostly uneventful, with the first points coming early in the fourth quarter via a Georgia Tech two-yard touchdown run to break up shutout. Clemson added a field goal to bring the score to 26–7 at the end. Deshaun Watson crossed the 300 yard mark for the first time on the year, finishing with 304 yards and two touchdowns.

=== Louisville ===
No. 3 Louisville Cardinals at No. 5 Clemson Tigers − Game summary

Quarter	1	2	3	4	Total
No. 3 Louisville	0	10	16	10	36
No. 5 Clemson	0	28	0	14	42

at Memorial Stadium • Clemson, SC

- Date: October 4, 2016
- Game time: 8:22 p.m.
- Game weather: Temperature: 72° • Wind: Calm • Weather: Clear
- Game attendance: 83,362
- Referee: Gary Patterson
- TV announcers (ABC): Chris Fowler (Play-by-Play), Kirk Herbstreit (Color Analyst), Samantha Ponder, and Tom Rinaldi (sideline reporter)

Game information

First quarter Second quarter

- (14:18) UL TD - Jeremey Smith 1 yard run (Blanton Creque PAT).
- (07:45) CLEM TD - Deshaun Watson 33 yard pass to Deon Cain (Greg Hugel PAT).
- (06:09) CLEM TD - Wayne Gallman 24 yard run (Greg Hugel PAT).
- (03:47) CLEM TD - Deshaun Watson 37 yard pass to Deon Cain (Greg Hugel PAT).
- (00:37) UL FG - Blanton Creque: 26 yards
- (00:05) CLEM TD - Deshaun Watsonn 5 yard pass to Artavis Scott (Greg Hugel PAT).

Third quarter

- (11:20) UL TD - Lamar Jackson 8 yard pass to James Quick (Blanton Creque PAT failed).
- (05:21) UL FG - Blanton Creque: 21 yards
- (00:45) UL TD - Lamar Jackson 1 yard run (Blanton Creque PAT).

Fourth quarter

- (10:23) UL FG - Blanton Creque: 28 yards
- (07:52) UL TD - Lamar Jackson 11 yard run (Blanton Creque PAT).
- (07:05) CLEM TD - Deshaun Watson 20 yard pass to Mike Williamson (2 PT Conversion failed).
- (03:14) CLEM TD - Deshaun Watson 31 yard pass to Jordan Leggett (2 PT Conversion GOOD - Watson to Leggett)

Top passers

- CLEM - Deshaun Watson 20-31, 306 yards, 5 TD, 3 INT
- UL - Lamar Jackson 27-44, 295 yards, 1 TD, 1 INT

Top rushers

- CLEM - Wayne Gallman 16 carries, 110 yards, 1 TD
- UL - Lamar Jackson 31 carries, 162 yards, 2 TD

Top Receiving

- CLEM - Deon Cain 4 receptions, 98 yards, 2 TD
- UL - Cole Hikutini 7 receptions, 84 yards

Clemson returned home for a highly anticipated match-up against Louisville. The Cardinals were led by eventual Heisman Trophy-winning quarterback Lamar Jackson and were ranked third in the country, while Clemson had slid to fifth in the polls. ESPN College Gameday came to campus during the week of the game. The game lived up to the hype, as Clemson won a tight contest, 42–36.

The game started off slowly, with each team punting on their first three possessions. Louisville struck first in the second quarter with a one-yard touchdown run by Jeremy Smith. Clemson tied the game with a 33-yard pass from Deshaun Watson to Deon Cain. After a Louisville fumble at their own 39 yard line, Wayne Gallman extended the Clemson lead with a 24-yard touchdown run. With 3:27 left in the half, Watson completed another touchdown pass to Cain. Louisville kicked a field goal with 36 seconds left in the half, but Watson led a rapid touchdown drive before the half, completing a five-yard pass to Artavis Scott to make the score 28–10.

The start of the second half went much better for the Cardinals, as they scored 26 unanswered points to take the lead. Clemson's first drive ended with a Deshaun Watson interception at their own 36 yard line, after which Lamar Jackson completed an eight-yard touchdown pass to James Quick. Louisville added a field goal, and then, after a fumble by Clemson's Jordan Leggett, scored another touchdown, this time on a one-yard Lamar Jackson run. Louisville added another field goal, followed by another Watson interception. Lamar Jackson led the Cardinals down the field and ran in for an 11-yard touchdown to take a 36–28 lead with 7:52 remaining in the game. Clemson's Artavis Scott returned the ensuing kickoff 77 yards to the Louisville 23 yard line, and Deshaun Watson connected with Mike Williams for a 20-yard touchdown two plays later. A Clemson two-point conversion attempt ended in an interception, and so Clemson trailed by two points. The Tiger defense forced a Louisville three-and-out, and Watson led Clemson down the field again and scored a 31-yard touchdown pass to Jordan Leggett to take the lead with 3:14 remaining. Watson and Leggett connected again for the two-point conversion and a six-point lead. Lamar Jackson led the Cardinals down the field and got as far as the Clemson 9 yard line in the final minute of the game, but failed to convert on 4th and 12 and turned the ball over on downs. Clemson wound down the clock to win the game.

Deshaun Watson threw for 306 passing yards, five touchdowns, and three interceptions. He added 91 rushing yards on the ground. Louisville's Lamar Jackson had 295 passing yards and 162 rushing yards.

=== At Boston College ===
No. 3 Clemson Tigers at Boston College − Game summary

Quarter	1	2	3	4	Total
No. 3 Clemson	21	0	14	21	56
Boston College	3	0	7	0	10

at Alumni Stadium • Chestnut Hill, MA

- Date: October 7, 2016
- Game time: 7:32 p.m.
- Game weather: Temperature: 61° • Wind: ESE 4 mph • Weather: Clear
- Game attendance: 44,500
- Referee: Jeff Maconaghy
- TV announcers (ESPN): Anish Shroff (Play-by-Play), Ahmad Brooks (Color Analyst), Tiffany Greene (sideline reporter)

Game information

First quarter

- (11:08) BC FG - Mike Knoll: 21 yards
- (09:22) CLEM TD - Wayne Gallman 59 yard run (Greg Hugel PAT).
- (03:12) CLEM TD - Deshaun Watson 9 yard pass to Mike Williams (Greg Hugel PAT).
- (01:29) CLEM TD - Deshaun Watson 56 yard pass to Jordan Leggett (Greg Hugel PAT).

Second quarter Third quarter

- (11:38) CLEM TD - Deshaun Watson 29 yard pass to Deon Cain (Greg Hugel PAT).
- (05:18) CLEM TD - Deshaun Watson 16 yard pass to Deon Cain (Greg Hugel PAT).
- (00:27) BC TD - Patrick Towles 1 yard pass to Bobby Wolford (Mike Knoll PAT).

Fourth quarter

- (11:21) CLEM TD - Tyshon Dye 3 yard run (Greg Hugel PAT).
- (03:09) CLEM TD - Tavien Feaster 45 yard run (Greg Hugel PAT).
- (01:30) CLEM TD - Mark Fields 42 yard INT return (Greg Hugel PAT).

Top passers

- CLEM - Deshaun Watson 15-25, 270 yards, 4 TD
- BC - Patrick Towles 11-22, 91 yards, 1 TD

Top rushers

- CLEM - Wayne Gallman 9 carries, 109 yards, 1 TD
- BC - Davon Jones 12 carries, 48 yards

Top Receiving

- CLEM - Deon Cain 3 receptions, 68 yards, 2 TD
- BC - Tommy Sweeney 4 receptions, 48 yards

Clemson next traveled to Chestnut Hill, Massachusetts to play Boston College. Clemson won convincingly to win the O'Rourke–McFadden Trophy, 56–10.

Boston College was forced to punt after their first drive, but Clemson's Ray-Ray McCloud fumbled the punt at Clemson's own nine yard line. BC settled for a 21-yard field goal four plays later. On the next drive, Wayne Gallman broke off a 59-yard touchdown run to take the lead for the Tigers. Deshaun Watson added two more first quarter touchdowns for Clemson via a nine-yard pass to Mike Williams and a 56-yard pass to Jordan Leggett. Neither team scored in the second quarter, and the score was 21–3 at halftime. Clemson scored touchdowns on each of their first three drives of the second half to put the game away. The first was a 29-yard pass from Watson to Deon Cain, followed by another Watson-to-Cain connection for 16 yards. Boston College's sole touchdown came in the third quarter via a one-yard pass from Bobby Wolford to Patrick Towles. Clemson scored two rushing touchdowns in the fourth quarter, from Tyshon Dye and Tavien Feaster. Clemson scored one last time in the final two minutes with a 42-yard interception return for a touchdown by Mark Fields.

=== NC State ===
NC State Wolfpack at No. 3 Clemson Tigers − Game summary

Quarter	1	2	3	4	OT	Total
North Carolina State	0	3	7	7	0	17
No. 3 Clemson	3	7	7	0	7	24

at Memorial Stadium • Clemson, SC

- Date: October 15, 2016
- Game time: 12:07 p.m.
- Game weather: Temperature: 73° • Wind: Light • Weather: Partly Sunny
- Game attendance: 82,104
- Referee: Jeff Flanagan
- TV announcers (ABC): Steve Levy, Brian Griese, Todd McShay

Game information

First quarter

- (01:17) CLEM FG - Greg Huegel: 25 yards

Second quarter

- (02:03) NCST FG - Kyle Bambard: 28 yards
- (00:10) CLEM TD - Deshaun Watson 13 yard pass to Mike Williams (Greg Hugel PAT).

Third quarter

- (14:51) NCST TD - Mike Stevens 28 yard interception return (Kyle Bambard PAT).
- (01:03) CLEM TD - Deshaun Watson 4 yard run (Greg Hugel PAT).

Fourth quarter

- (11:29) NCST TD - Matthew Dayes 2 yard run (Kyle Bambard PAT).

Overtime

- (15:00) CLEM TD - Deshaun Watson 10 yard pass to Artavis Scott (Greg Hugel PAT).

Top passers

- CLEM - Deshaun Watson 35-52, 378 yards, 2 TD, 1 INT
- NCST - Ryan Finley 20-40, 231 yards, 2 INT

Top rushers

- CLEM - C.J. Fuller 16 carries, 56 yards
- NCST - Matthew Dayes 22 carries, 108 yards, 1 TD

Top Receiving

- CLEM - Mike Williams 12 receptions, 146 yards, 1 TD
- NCST - Jaylen Samuels 8 receptions, 100 yards

Clemson next returned home to face ACC opponent NC State. Clemson survived another close call and won the game in overtime, 24–17.

Clemson got on the board first with a late first quarter field goal by Greg Huegel. NC State answered with a field goal of their own with 2:03 left in the first half. Deshaun Watson led a successful two-minute drill and scored the game's first touchdown via a 13-yard pass to Mike Williams just before the half to secure a 10–3 lead. Clemson received the second half kickoff, but two plays later, Watson threw his first career pick six, returned 28 yards for a touchdown by NC State's Mike Stevens. Clemson fumbled the ball on their next two possessions, but benefited from a missed field goal and took a 17–10 lead with a Watson touchdown run late in the third quarter. NC State responded with a 14-play touchdown drive that ended in a two-yard run by Matthew Dayes to tie the game. Clemson was forced to punt with 6:39 remaining, and NC State was able to wind down the clock and drive the ball down to the Clemson 16 yard line. NC State kicker Kyle Bambard lined up for the potential game-winning field goal from just 33 yards out, but missed it wide right as time expired in regulation. In overtime, Clemson was able to score a touchdown with a 10-yard pass from Deshaun Watson to Artavis Scott. NC State's possession ended on the first play when Ryan Finley threw an interception caught by Marcus Edmond in the endzone.

=== At Florida State ===
No. 4 Clemson Tigers at No. 12 Florida State Seminoles− Game summary

Quarter	1	2	3	4	Total
No. 4 Clemson	14	3	3	17	37
No. 12 Florida State	0	14	14	6	34

at Doak Campbell Stadium • Tallahassee, FL

- Date: October 29, 2016
- Game time: 8:22 p.m.
- Game weather: Temperature: 72° • Wind: Calm • Weather: Clear
- Game attendance: 78,025
- Referee: Jeff Heaser
- TV announcers (ABC): Chris Fowler (Play-by-Play), Kirk Herbstreit (Color Analyst), Samantha Ponder (sideline reporter)

Game information

First quarter

- (11:05) CLEM TD - Wayne Gallman 1 yard run (Greg Hugel PAT).
- (01:41) CLEM TD - Deshaun Watson 4 yard pass to Hunter Renfrow (Greg Hugel PAT).

Second quarter

- (08:20) FSU TD - Dalvin Cook 4 yard run (Roberto Aguayo PAT).
- (01:49) CLEM FG - Greg Hugel: 23 yards.
- (00:23) FSU TD - Dondre Francois 5 yard pass to Nyqwan Murray (Roberto Aguayo PAT).

Third quarter

- (09:08) CLEM FG - Greg Hugel: 34 yards.
- (06:18) FSU TD - Dalvin Cook 43 yard run (Roberto Aguayo PAT).
- (00:43) FSU TD - Dalvin Cook 70 yard run (Roberto Aguayo PAT).

Fourth quarter

- (11:30) CLEM TD - Wayne Gallman 2 yard run (2 Point Conversion failed).
- (05:25) CLEM FG - Greg Hugel: 46 yards.
- (03:23) FSU TD - Dalvin Cook 8 yard run (2 Point Conversion failed).
- (02:06) CLEM TD - Deshaun Watson 34 yard pass to Jordan Leggett (2 Point Conversion Good).

Top passers

- CLEM - Deshaun Watson 27-43, 378 yards, 2 TD, 2 INT
- FSU - Dondre Francois 17-35, 286 yards, 1TD, 1 INT

Top rushers

- CLEM - Wayne Gallman 20 carries, 82 yards, 2 TD
- FSU - Dalvin Cook 19 carries, 169 yards, 4 TD

Top Receiving

- CLEM - Jordan Leggett 5 receptions, 122 yards, 1 TD
- FSU - Nyqwan Murray 6 receptions, 96 yards, 1 TD

After the win against NC State, Clemson traveled to Tallahassee, Florida to face No. 12 Florida State. Clemson pulled off yet another close win, pulling ahead late to win 37–34. It was their first win on the road against FSU in 10 years.

Clemson scored on the game's opening drive via a one-yard run by Wayne Gallman, and scored again on their following drive with a four-yard pass from Deshaun Watson to Hunter Renfrow to take an early 14–0. After a Watson interception at the FSU 40 yard line, the Seminoles scored with a four-yard run by Dalvin Cook. Clemson added a field goal with 1:49 left in the half, but Florida State was able to march down the field and score a five-yard touchdown pass from Deondre Francois to Nyqwan Murray before the half, making the score 17–14 Clemson at halftime.

Clemson kicked a field goal on their first possession of the second half, but in their next possession, Watson threw another interception at their own 43 yard line. On the next play, Dalvin Cook ran the ball to the house for a touchdown and the lead. Later in the quarter, Cook extended the Florida State lead to eight with a 70-yard touchdown run. Clemson responded with a 75-yard drive that ended with a two-yard Wayne Gallman touchdown run to pull within two. The Tigers took a one point lead with a 46-yard field goal with 5:25 remaining. Dalvin Cook scored his career-high-setting fourth touchdown of the day with an eight-yard run with 3:23 remaining to claim the lead again for Florida State. Deshaun Watson responded with a 34-yard touchdown pass to Jordan Leggett, and the Tigers converted the two-point attempt to secure a 37–34 lead with 2:06 remaining. Florida State got as far as the Clemson 34 yard line, but penalties and a sack by Christian Wilkins pushed them far out of field goal range to end the game. Deshaun Watson finished with 430 total yards of offense in the game.

=== Syracuse ===
Syracuse Orange at No. 3 Clemson Tigers − Game summary

Quarter	1	2	3	4	Total
Syracuse	0	0	0	0	0
No. 3 Clemson	10	20	14	10	54

at Memorial Stadium • Clemson, SC

- Date: November 5, 2016
- Game time: 3:36 p.m.
- Game weather: Temperature: 70° • Wind: Light • Weather: Sunny
- Game attendance: 80,609
- Referee: David Epperley
- TV announcers (ABC): Dave LaMont, Ray Bentley, Marty Smith

Game information

First quarter

- (09:26) CLEM FG - Greg Huegel: 22 yards
- (03:47) CLEM TD - Deshaun Watson 1 yard run (Greg Hugel PAT).

Second quarter

- (14:11) CLEM TD - Deshaun Watson 65 yard pass to Deon Cain (Greg Hugel missed PAT).
- (07:16) CLEM TD - Deshaun Watson 14 yard pass to Mike Williams (Greg Hugel PAT).
- (01:27) CLEM TD - Nick Schuessler 5 yard pass to Artavis Scott (Greg Hugel PAT).

Third quarter

- (12:08) CLEM TD - Wayne Gallman 5 yard run (Greg Hugel PAT).
- (01:26) CLEM TD - Nick Schuessler 18 yard pass to Deon Cain (Greg Hugel PAT).

Fourth quarter

- (11:42) CLEM FG - Greg Huegel: 46 yards
- (15:00) CLEM TD - Tanner Muse 64 yard interception return (Christian Groomes PAT).

Top passers

- CLEM - Nick Schuessler 11-17, 177 yards, 2 TD
- SU - Austin Wilson 17-27, 116 yards, 2 INT

Top rushers

- CLEM - Wayne Gallman 10 carries, 63 yards, 1 TD
- SU - Moe Neal 7 carries, 67 yards

Top Receiving

- CLEM - Deon Cain 5 receptions, 125 yards, 2 TD
- SU - Amba Etta-Tawo 9 receptions, 84 yards

After beating Florida State, Clemson returned home to face Syracuse. Clemson won in a blowout, 54–0.

Deshaun Watson scored the game's first three touchdowns before leaving the game with a bruised shoulder. Head coach Dabo Swinney said the injury was not likely to affect the next week's game against Pittsburgh. His first touchdown came via a one-yard run, followed by a 65-yard pass to Deon Cain and then a 14-yard pass to Mike Williams. Nick Schuessler and Kelly Bryant traded snaps at quarterback for the remainder of the game. Schuessler had two touchdowns through the air, while Wayne Gallman added another on the ground. Tanner Muse added a 64-yard interception return in the fourth quarter for Clemson's last points of the day.

=== Pittsburgh ===
Pittsburgh Panthers at No. 3 Clemson Tigers − Game summary

Quarter	1	2	3	4	Total
Pittsburgh	14	13	7	9	43
No. 3 Clemson	14	14	14	0	42

at Memorial Stadium • Clemson, SC

- Date: November 12, 2016
- Game time: 3:39 p.m.
- Game weather: Temperature: 63° • Wind: E6mph • Weather: Clear
- Game attendance: 81,048
- Referee: Duane Heydt
- TV announcers (ABC): Steve Levy, Brian Griese, Todd McShay

Game information

First quarter

- (13:08) PITT TD - Nathan Peterman 15 yard pass to George Aston (Chris Blewitt PAT).
- (07:19) CLEM TD - Wayne Gallman 1 yard run (Greg Hugel PAT).
- (05:28) PITT TD - Nathan Peterman 46 yard pass to James Conner (chris Blewitt PAT).
- (00:40) CLEM TD - Wayne Gallman 1 yard run (Greg Hugel PAT).

Second quarter

- (10:06) CLEM TD - Deshaun Watson 15 yard pass to Mike Williams (Greg Hugel PAT).
- (09:33) PITT TD - Nathan Peterman 55 yard pass to Scott Orndoff (Chris Blewitt PAT blocked).
- (02:23) PITT TD - Nathan Peterman 1 yard pass to George Aston (Chris Blewitt PAT)
- (1:09) CLEM TD - Deshaun Watson 13 yard pass to Artavis Scott (Greg Huegel PAT)

Third quarter

- (09:53) CLEM TD - Deshaun Watson 27 yard pass to Deon Cain (Greg Huegel PAT).
- (04:35) PITT TD - Nathan Peterman 7 yard pass to Scott Orndoff (Chris Blewitt kick).
- (01:37) CLEM TD - Wayne Gallman 1 yard run (Greg Hugel PAT).

Fourth quarter

- (05:17) PITT TD - James Conner 20 yard run (2 point conversion failed)
- (00:06) PITT FG - Chris Blewitt: 48 yards.

Top passers

- CLEM - Deshaun Watson 52-70, 580 yards, 3 TD, 3 INT
- PITT - Nathan Peterman 22-37, 308 yards, 5 TD

Top rushers

- CLEM - Wayne Gallman 18 carries, 36 yards, 3 TD
- PITT - James Conner 20 carries, 134 yards, 1 TD

Top Receiving

- CLEM - Mike Williams 15 receptions, 202 yards, 1 TD
- PITT - Scott Orndoff 9 receptions, 128 yards, 2 TD

Clemson's next game was against Pittsburgh. The Panthers stunned the Tigers at home, winning by a score of 43–42. It was the first loss to an unranked opponent in 46 games for Clemson, who at the time of the game was ranked second in the CFP rankings and third in the AP Poll.

Pittsburgh received the opening kickoff and scored on their first drive with a pass from Nathan Peterman to George Aston from 15 yards out. Wayne Gallman tied the game for Clemson with a one-yard touchdown run two drives later. Pittsburgh responded with a 46-yard touchdown pass from Peterman to James Conner, which was followed by another one-yard Gallman run to tie the game at 14 apiece at the end of the first quarter. Clemson took the lead with a 15-yard touchdown pass from Deshaun Watson to Mike Williams, but Pittsburgh scored once again with a 55-yard touchdown pass from Peterman to Scott Orndoff. Chris Blewitt's extra point missed, so Pittsburgh trailed 21–20. The Panthers took the lead with 2:23 left in the first half with another Peterman touchdown pass, this time from one yard out complete to George Aston. Clemson took back their one point lead with a 13-yard touchdown pass from Watson to Artavis Scott with 1:09 remaining in the half. Pittsburgh drove to the Clemson 35 yard line in the final minute, but Blewitt's 53-yard field goal attempt was blocked by Dexter Lawrence.

In the second half, Clemson extended their lead to eight with a 27-yard touchdown pass from Deshaun Watson to Deon Cain. Pittsburgh once again cut the lead to one with a Nathan Peterman touchdown pass, his fifth of the game, a career high. Near the end of the third quarter, Clemson running back Wayne Gallman scored another touchdown from one yard out. In the fourth quarter, with Clemson driving again, Watson threw an interception in the Pittsburgh endzone, which was returned 70 yards to the Clemson 30 by Saleem Brightwell. Three plays later, Pittsburgh pulled within two points with 5:17 remaining with a 20-yard run by James Conner (their two point conversion attempt failed). Watson and the Clemson offense drove to the Pittsburgh 35 yard line, but Wayne Gallman was stuffed on 4th and 1 to turn the ball over with 58 seconds to go. Peterman led the Pittsburgh offense down the field, and Chris Blewitt kicked the go-ahead 48-yard field goal with six seconds remaining. Deshaun Watson finished with a career-high 580 passing yards in the game.

=== At Wake Forest ===
No. 5 Clemson Tigers at Wake Forest Demon Deacons− Game summary

Quarter	1	2	3	4	Total
No. 5 Clemson	21	7	0	7	35
Wake Forest	0	10	3	0	13

at BB&T Field • Winston-Salem, NC

- Date: November 19, 2016
- Game time: 7:05 p.m.
- Game weather: Temperature: 44° • Wind: NW 16 mph • Weather: Clear
- Game attendance: 31,512
- Referee: Jeff Flanagan
- TV announcers (ESPN): Bob Wischusen, Brock Huard, Allison Williams

Game information

First quarter

- (11:24) CLEM TD - Wayne Gallman 42 yard run (Greg Hugel PAT).
- (06:22) CLEM TD - Deshaun Watson 3 yard run (Greg Hugel PAT).
- (01:10) CLEM TD - Deshaun Watson 15 yard pass to Mike Williams (Greg Hugel PAT).

Second quarter

- (12:44) CLEM TD - Deshaun Watson 2 yard run (Greg Hugel PAT).
- (10:04) WAKE FG - Mike Weaver: 42 yards
- (03:31) WAKE TD - Cade Carney 1 yard run (Mike Weaver PAT).

Third quarter

- (05:03) WAKE FG - Mike Weaver: 23 yards

Fourth quarter

- (11:30) CLEM TD - Wayne Gallman 1 yard run (Greg Huegel PAT).

Top passers

- CLEM - Deshaun Watson 23-33, 202 yards, 1 TD
- WAKE - Kyle Kearns 7-18, 126 yards

Top rushers

- CLEM - Wayne Gallman 22 carries, 162 yards, 2 TD
- WAKE - Cade Carney 18 carries, 59 yards, 1 TD

Top Receiving

- CLEM - Mike Williams 6 receptions, 58 yards, 1 TD
- WAKE - Chuck Wade 2 receptions, 55 yards

Following the loss to Pittsburgh, Clemson traveled to Winston-Salem, North Carolina to face Wake Forest with a chance to clinch the ACC Atlantic Division title. Clemson did just that with a 35–13 victory.

Clemson scored on each of their first four possessions to take a commanding 28–0 lead. The first score came with a 42-yard touchdown run by Wayne Gallman. Deshaun Watson then ran one in himself from three yards, followed by a 15-yard touchdown pass to Mike Williams, and another rushing touchdown early in the second quarter. On Wake Forest's next possession, they were forced to punt, but Clemson's Ray-Ray McCloud fumbled the punt on Clemson's 27 yard line. Wake Forest settled for a 42-yard field goal four plays later. The Demon Deacons were able to drive down the field on their next possession and score a one-yard touchdown run to make the score 28–10 at halftime. Wake Forest was first to score in the second half with a 23-yard field goal. Wayne Gallman punched in a one-yard touchdown run early in the fourth quarter to secure the 35–13 lead for Clemson that held until the end of the game.

=== South Carolina ===
South Carolina Gamecocks at No. 4 Clemson Tigers (114th Palmetto Bowl)

Quarter	1	2	3	4	Total
Gamecocks	0	0	7	0	7
No. 4 Tigers	21	14	14	7	56

at Memorial Stadium • Clemson, SC

- Date: November 26, 2016
- Game time: 7:30 p.m. ET
- Game weather: Temperature: 55° • Wind: E 2 mph • Weather: Clear Skies
- Game attendance: 81,542
- Referee: Marc Curles
- TV announcers (ESPN): Dave Pasch (play-by-play), Greg McElroy (color), Tom Luginbill (sideline)
- Source

Game information

First quarter

- (11:08) CLEM TD: Deshaun Watson 34-yard pass to Mike Williams (Greg Huegel PAT).
- (5:52) CLEM TD: Deshaun Watson 19-yard pass to Mike Williams (Greg Huegel PAT).
- (2:05) CLEM TD: Deshaun Watson 11-yard pass to Jordan Leggett (Greg Huegel PAT).

Second quarter

- (3:06) CLEM TD: Wayne Gallman 8-yard rush (Greg Huegel PAT).
- (0:08) CLEM TD: Deshaun Watson 16-yard pass to Mike Williams (Greg Huegel PAT).

Third quarter

- (12:44) CLEM TD: Deshaun Watson 18-yard pass to C.J. Fuller(Greg Huegel PAT).
- (11:24) USC TD: Deebo Samuel 33-yard pass to Bryan Edwards(Elliot Fry PAT).
- (04:38) CLEM TD: Deshaun Watson 3-yard pass to Artavis Scott (Greg Huegel PAT).

Fourth quarter

- (03:07) CLEM TD: Kelly Bryant 1-yard run (Greg Huegel PAT).

Top passers

- SC – Jake Bentley 7-17, 41 yards, 1 INT
- CLEM – Deshaun Watson 26-32, 347 yards, 6 TD, 1 INT

Top rushers

- SC – Rod Talley 6 carries, 50 yards
- CLEM – Wayne Gallman 19 carries, 112 yards, 1 TD

Top Receiving

- SC – Bryan Edwards 1 rec, 33 yards, 1 TD
- CLEM – Mike Williams 6 rec, 100 yards, 3 TD

Clemson held their regular season finale at home against in-state rival South Carolina. Clemson won in a blowout, 56–7, the school's third straight win against South Carolina and their largest margin of victory in the series since winning 51–0 in 1900.

Clemson's first drive of the game ended with a blocked 39-yard field goal attempt, but on the next play they intercepted a pass from South Carolina's Jake Bentley, and scored a touchdown three plays later via a 34-yard touchdown pass from Deshaun Watson to Mike Williams. Watson and Williams connected again for a 19-yard touchdown on the next drive, and on the drive after that Watson threw an 11-yard touchdown pass to Jordan Leggett to take a 21–0 lead in the first quarter. Clemson added two more touchdowns in the final 3:06 of the first half with an eight-yard run by Wayne Gallman and another Watson-Williams pass from 16 yards out. The score was 35–0 at halftime. In the second half, Clemson scored on their first possession with a pass from Watson to C. J. Fuller. South Carolina broke up the shutout on the next drive with a 33-yard pass from wide receiver Deebo Samuel to Bryan Edwards. Clemson responded with yet another touchdown, with Deshaun Watson throwing his fifth touchdown pass of the game (a career high) to Artavis Scott. Kelly Bryant added a rushing touchdown before the end of the game to bring the final score to 56–7.

=== Vs. Virginia Tech—ACC Championship Game ===
No. 3 Clemson Tigers vs No. 19 Virginia Tech Hokies(2016 ACC Championship game)

Quarter	1	2	3	4	Total
No. 3 Tigers	14	7	14	7	42
No. 19 Hokies	7	7	7	14	35

at Camping World Stadium • Orlando, FL

- Date: December 3, 2016
- Game time: 8:14 p.m. ET
- Game weather: Temperature: 66° • Wind: ENE 6 mph • Weather: Fair
- Game attendance: 50,628
- Referee: Jeff Flanagan
- TV announcers (ABC): Chris Fowler (Play-by-play), Kirk Herbstreit (Analyst), Samantha Ponder (Sideline Reporter)
- Source

Game information

First quarter

- (11:47) CLEM TD: Deshaun Watson 3 yard run (Greg Huegel PAT).
- (05:57) CLEM TD: Deshaun Watson 21 yard pass to Jordan Leggett (Greg Huegel PAT)
- (00:51) VT TD: Travon McMillian 1 yard run (Joey Slye PAT).

Second quarter

- (11:46) CLEM TD: Deshaun Watson 10 yard pass to Jordan Leggett (Greg Huegel PAT)
- (04:09) VT TD: Jerod Evans 11 yard run (Joey Slye PAT)

Third quarter

- (09:17) CLEM TD: Wayne Gallman 8 yard run (Greg Huegel PAT).
- (04:45) CLEM TD: Deshaun Watson 2 yard run (Greg Huegel PAT).
- (02:27) VT TD: Travon McMillian 27 yard run (Joey Slye PAT).

Fourth quarter

- (11:35) VT TD: Jerod Evans 5 yard run (Joey Slye PAT).
- (07:33) CLEM TD: Deshaun Watson 15 yard pass to Hunter Renfrow (Greg Huegel PAT).
- (05:43) VT TD: Jerod Evans 26 yard pass to Cam Philips (Joey Slye PAT)

Top passers

- CLEM – Deshaun Watson 23-34, 288 yards, 3 TD, 1 INT
- VT - Jerod Evans 21-35, 264 yards, 1 TD, 2 INT

Top rushers

- CLEM – Deshaun Watson 17 carries, 85 yards, 2 TD
- VT - Jerod Evans 21 carries, 46 yards, 2 TD

Top Receiving

- CLEM – Mike Williams 5 receptions, 57 yards
- VT - Cam Philips 12 receptions, 92 yards, 1 TD

Clemson and Louisville both finished with ACC records of 7–1, but since Clemson won the head-to-head match-up, the Tigers won the tiebreaker to represent the Atlantic Division in the 2016 ACC Championship Game in Orlando, Florida. Clemson defeated Coastal Division champion Virginia Tech, 42–35, to win the Atlantic Coast Conference for the second straight year.

Clemson received the opening kickoff and scored on their opening drive via a three-yard touchdown run by Deshaun Watson. They expanded their lead to 14 on the next drive with a 21-yard pass from Watson to Jordan Leggett. Near the end of the first quarter, Virginia Tech got on the board with a one-yard touchdown run by Travon McMillian. Clemson responded with another touchdown pass from Watson to Leggett from 10 yards out. Virginia Tech scored another touchdown with 4:09 left in the half with an 11-yard touchdown run by Jerod Evans to make the score 21–14 Clemson. This proved to be the final score of the half.

After two Virginia Tech punts and a Deshaun Watson interception to start the second half, Clemson scored on an 89-yard drive that ended with a Wayne Gallman eight-yard run. Later in the quarter, Watson, scored on a two-yard run to make the score 35–14. Virginia Tech scored 14 unanswered points with touchdown runs by Travon McMillian and Jerod Evans to pull within a touchdown of Clemson. Deshaun Watson again extended the lead with a 15-yard touchdown pass to Hunter Renfrow. Virginia Tech scored again on their next possession with a 26-yard pass from Jerod Evans to Cam Phillips with 5:43 remaining. Down by seven points, Virginia Tech drove to the Clemson 23 yard line in the final two minutes, but a Jerod Evans pass was intercepted by Cordrea Tankersley. Clemson wound down the clock to end the game.

== College Football Playoff ==
=== Vs. Ohio State—Fiesta Bowl (CFP semifinal) ===
No. 2 Clemson Tigers vs No. 3 Ohio State Buckeyes (2016 CFP semifinal)

Quarter	1	2	3	4	Total
No. 3 Buckeyes	0	0	0	0	0
No. 2 Tigers	10	7	7	7	31

at University of Phoenix Stadium • Glendale, AZ

- Date: December 31, 2016
- Game time: 5:10 p.m. ET
- Game weather: Indoors
- Game attendance: 70,236
- Referee: Land Clark
- TV announcers (ESPN/ESPN Radio/ESPN Deportes Radio): Chris Fowler (Play-by-play), Kirk Herbstreit (Analyst), Samantha Ponder, & Tom Rinaldi (Sideline reporters)/Bill Rosinski (Play-by-play), David Norrie (Color), & Ian Fitzsimmons (Sideline)/Kenneth Garay (Play-by-play) & Sebastian Martinez-Christensen (Color)

Game information

First quarter

- (09:16) CLEM FG: Greg Huegel: 45 yards.
- (02:16) CLEM TD: Deshaun Watson 1 yard run (Greg Huegel PAT).

Second quarter

- (02:21) CLEM TD: Deshaun Watson 30 yard pass to C.J. Fuller (Greg Huegel PAT)

Third quarter

- (02:06) CLEM TD: Deshaun Watson 7 yard run (Greg Huegel PAT).

Fourth quarter

- (08:51) CLEM TD: Wayne Gallman 7 yard run (Greg Huegel PAT).

Top passers

- CLEM – Deshaun Watson 23-36, 259 yards, 1 TD, 2 INT
- OSU - J. T. Barrett 19-22, 127 yards, 2 INT

Top rushers

- CLEM – Wayne Gallman 18 carries, 85 yards, 1 TD
- OSU - Curtis Samuel 6 carries, 67 yards

Top Receiving

- CLEM – Mike Williams 6 receptions, 96 yards
- OSU - Curtis Samuel 9 receptions, 43 yards

In the final College Football Playoff rankings of the year, Clemson (12–1) was ranked second, earning them their second consecutive playoff bid and a spot in the semifinal game to be played at the Fiesta Bowl. Their opponent was Ohio State (11–1), who was somewhat controversially ranked third after failing to reach the Big Ten Championship Game by finishing in second in the East Division to Penn State. Ohio State was considered a three-point favorite in the game by Las Vegas sportsbooks. Clemson shutout the Buckeyes by a score of 31–0 in the Fiesta Bowl to advance to the CFP Championship Game. It was the second shutout in the history of the CFP.

Clemson's first drive ended abruptly with a Deshaun Watson interception on their second play at their own 33 yard line. Ohio State failed to capitalize, missing a 47-yard field goal four plays later. Clemson's next drive ended with a 45-yard field goal by Greg Heugel. Ohio State missed another 47-yard field goal on their next possession. Clemson scored their first touchdown on the following drive with a one-yard run by Deshaun Watson. They extended their lead with 2:21 left in the first half with a 30-yard pass from Watson to C. J. Fuller. The score was 17–0 at halftime. The third quarter featured little offensive success for either team until Deshaun Watson scored a seven-yard touchdown run late in the quarter. Ohio State's J. T. Barrett threw two interceptions on their following two drives, and Clemson scored again with a seven-yard run by Wayne Gallman to make the score 31–0 with 8:51 left to play. This proved to be the final score of the game. Deshaun Watson was named offensive MVP, and defensive lineman Clelin Ferrell was named defensive MVP.

=== Vs. Alabama—2017 CFP National Championship ===
No. 2 Clemson Tigers vs No. 1 Alabama Crimson Tide (2017 CFP Championship game)

Quarter	1	2	3	4	Total
No. 2 Tigers	0	7	7	21	35
No. 1 Crimson Tide	7	7	10	7	31

at Raymond James Stadium • Tampa, FL

- Date: January 9, 2017
- Game time: 8:19 p.m. ET
- Game weather: Temperature: 56° • Wind: Calm • Weather: Fair
- Game attendance: 74,512
- Referee: Mike Defee (Big 12)
- TV announcers (ESPN/ESPN Radio): Chris Fowler (Play-by-play), Kirk Herbstreit (Analyst), Samantha Ponder, & Tom Rinaldi (Sideline Reporters)/Sean McDonough (Play-by-play), Todd Blackledge (Analyst), Holly Rowe, & Ian Fitzsimmons (Sideline Reporters)
- Source

Game information

First quarter

- (09:23) ALA TD: Bo Scarbrough 25 yard run (Adam Griffith PAT).

Second quarter

- (10:42) ALA TD: Bo Scarbrough 37 yard run (Adam Griffith PAT).
- (06:09) CLEM TD: Deshaun Watson 8 yard run (Greg Huegel PAT).

Third quarter

- (12:25) ALA FG: Adam Griffith: 27 yards
- (07:10) CLEM TD: Deshaun Watson 24 yard pass to Hunter Renfrow (Greg Huegel PAT).
- (01:53) ALA TD: Jalen Hurts 68 yard pass to O. J. Howard (Adam Griffith PAT)

Fourth quarter

- (14:00) CLEM TD: Deshaun Watson 4 yard pass to Mike Williams (Greg Huegel PAT)
- (04:38) CLEM TD: Wayne Gallman 1 yard run (Greg Huegel PAT)
- (02:07) ALA TD: Jalen Hurts 30 yard run (Adam Griffith PAT).
- (00:01) CLEM TD: Deshaun Watson 2 yard pass to Hunter Renfrow (Greg Huegel PAT)

Top passers

- CLEM – Deshaun Watson 36-56, 420 yards, 3 TD
- ALA - Jalen Hurts 13-31, 131 yards, 1 TD

Top rushers

- CLEM – Wayne Gallman 18 carries, 46 yards, 1 TD
- ALA - Bo Scarbrough 16 carries, 93 yards, 2 TD

Top Receiving

- CLEM – Hunter Renfrow 10 receptions, 92 yards, 2 TD
- ALA - O. J. Howard 4 receptions, 106 yards, 1 TD

By winning the Fiesta Bowl, Clemson advanced to the 2017 College Football Playoff National Championship to face the winner of the Peach Bowl, top-seeded Alabama (14–0). Clemson had lost to Alabama in the previous year's national championship, and this marked the first time since the inception of college football national title games in the 1990s of a rematch played between two schools. Alabama was considered a 6.5-point favorite to repeat as champions. Clemson won in dramatic fashion, 35–31, to secure their first national title since 1981.

Alabama was the first to score, with a 25-yard touchdown by Bo Scarbrough. They extended their lead to 14 with a 37-yard touchdown run early in the second quarter, again by Scarbrough. Three drives later, Clemson got on the board with an eight-yard touchdown run by Deshaun Watson with 6:09 left in the half. Both teams failed to score for the rest of the half, and the score was 14–7 Alabama at halftime.

Clemson received the second half kickoff, but four plays into the drive Wayne Gallman fumbled the ball at their own 28 yard line, and it was returned by Alabama's Ryan Anderson to the 16 yard line. Alabama failed to move the ball and settled for a 27-yard field goal. The two teams traded punts on their next possessions, before Deshaun Watson connected with Hunter Renfrow for a 24-yard touchdown pass to pull within three points. The two teams again traded punts, before Alabama's Jalen Hurts threw a 68-yard touchdown pass to tight end O. J. Howard to make the score 24–14 at the end of the third quarter. Clemson responded with a 72-yard drive that ended with a four-yard touchdown pass from Watson to Mike Williams to again pull within three. The defenses forced punts on the following five drives. With 4:38 left in the game, Clemson's Wayne Gallman scored a one-yard touchdown to take the lead. Alabama's Jalen Hurts led the Crimson Tide down the field on the following drive, and with 2:07 remaining scored a 30-yard touchdown run.

Down by four, Deshaun Watson marched the Tigers offense down the field in the final two minutes. Watson connected with Jordan Leggett for a 17-yard pass to the Alabama nine yard line with 19 seconds remaining. On second down, Alabama was charged with pass interference, bringing the ball to the two yard line with 9 seconds remaining. On the next play, Deshaun Watson rolled to his right and found a wide-open Hunter Renfrow in the endzone for the go-ahead touchdown with just one second showing on the clock. Clemson was able to recover the ensuing onside kick and kneeled on the final play to win the game. Deshaun Watson was named offensive MVP, and linebacker Ben Boulware was named defensive MVP.

== 2017 NFL draft ==
The Tigers had six players drafted in the 2017 NFL draft. Mike Williams was the first Tiger off the board, being selected at 7th overall.

Player	Team	Round	Pick #	Position
Mike Williams	Los Angeles Chargers	1st	7th	WR
Deshaun Watson	Houston Texans	1st	12th	QB
Cordrea Tankersley	Miami Dolphins	3rd	97th	CB
Wayne Gallman	New York Giants	4th	140th	RB
Carlos Watkins	Houston Texans	4th	142nd	DT
Jordan Leggett	New York Jets	4th	150th	TE

=== Undrafted signees ===
Along with the six draft picks, Clemson had one more player make the NFL as an undrafted free agent.

Player	Team	Position
Artavis Scott	Los Angeles Chargers	WR

== Awards and honors ==
=== Individual awards ===
ACC Co-defensive Player of the Year - Ben Boulware

ACC Defensive Rookie of the Year - Dexter Lawrence

Paul "Bear" Bryant Award - Dabo Swinney

FBS Assistant of the Year - Dan Brooks

Broyles Award - Brent Venables

Johnny Unitas Award - Deshaun Watson

Davey O'Brien Award - Deshaun Watson

Bobby Bowden Award - Deshaun Watson

Manning Award - Deshaun Watson

Jack Lambert Trophy - Ben Boulware

Heisman Trophy finalist - Deshaun Watson (2nd)

=== All-Americans ===
- CB Cordrea Tankersley: 1st Team - USA Today; 2nd Team - Fox Sports; 3rd Team - AP, Athlon
- QB Deshaun Watson: 1st Team - Scout.com; 2nd Team - AP, AFCA, Athlon, Sporting News, Sports Illustrated, Walter Camp
- DT Carlos Watkins: 1st Team - CBS Sports; 2nd Team - AP, Athlon
- DE Christian Wilkins: 1st Team - AFCA, FWAA; 2nd Team - Fox Sports, Sporting News, USA Today, Walter Camp; 3rd Team - AP, Athlon
- LB Ben Boulware: 2nd Team - AFCA, FWAA, USA Today, Walter Camp; 3rd Team - AP, Athlon
- TE Jordan Leggett: 2nd Team - CBS Sports; 3rd Team - Athlon
- WR Mike Williams: 2nd Team - Walter Camp; 3rd Team - Athlon
- DT Dexter Lawrence: Freshman - FWAA, ESPN, Scout.com, USA Today

=== All-ACC Teams ===
- 1st Team: LB Ben Boulware, OG Tyrone Crowder, C Jay Guillermo, OT Mitch Hyatt, S Jadar Johnson, TE Jordan Leggett, CB Cordrea Tankersley, WR Mike Williams
- 2nd Team: RB Wayne Gallman, PK Greg Huegel, DT Dexter Lawrence, QB Deshaun Watson, DE Christian Wilkins
- 3rd Team: WR Artavis Scott
- Honorable Mention: LB Kendall Joseph, SP Ray-Ray McCloud, S Van Smith
