= 2016 ACC Championship Game =

2016 Dr. Pepper ACC Championship Game
Clemson Tigers	Virginia Tech Hokies
(11–1)	(9–3)
42	35
Head coach: Dabo Swinney	Head coach: Justin Fuente
AP / Coaches / CFP; 3 / 3 / 3	AP / Coaches / CFP; 19 / 18 / 23
	1	2	3	4	Total
Clemson	14	7	14	7	42
Virginia Tech	7	7	7	14	35
- Date: December 3, 2016
- Season: 2016
- Stadium: Camping World Stadium
- Location: Orlando, Florida
- MVP: Deshaun Watson (QB, Clemson)
- Favorite: Clemson by 11
- Referee: Jeff Flanagan
- Attendance: 50,623

United States TV coverage
- Network: ABC/ESPN Radio
- Announcers: Chris Fowler (Play-by-Play), Kirk Herbstreit (Analyst), and Samantha Ponder (Sideline Reporter) (ABC); Bill Rosinski, David Norrie, and Ian Fitzsimmons (ESPN Radio)

2016 Atlantic Coast Conference football standings
	Conf.			Overall
Team	W		L	W		L
Atlantic Division
No. 1 Clemson xy$#	7	–	1	14	–	1
No. 21 Louisville x	7	–	1	9	–	4
No. 8 Florida State	5	–	3	10	–	3
NC State	3	–	5	7	–	6
Wake Forest	3	–	5	7	–	6
Boston College	2	–	6	7	–	6
Syracuse	2	–	6	4	–	8
Coastal Division
No. 16 Virginia Tech xy	6	–	2	10	–	4
North Carolina	5	–	3	8	–	5
No. 20 Miami (FL)	5	–	3	9	–	4
Pittsburgh	5	–	3	8	–	5
Georgia Tech	4	–	4	9	–	4
Duke	1	–	7	4	–	8
Virginia	1	–	7	2	–	10
Championship: Clemson 42, Virginia Tech 35
# – College Football Playoff champion; $ – Conference champion; x – Division champion/co-champions; y – Championship game participant; Rankings from AP Poll

The 2016 ACC Championship Game was the 12th football championship game for the Atlantic Coast Conference. The Clemson Tigers defeated the Virginia Tech Hokies, 42–35. The two programs also met five years earlier in the 2011 ACC Championship Game. The ACC Championship Game had been played at Bank of America Stadium in Charlotte, North Carolina, since 2010, but the ACC announced it would move its neutral site championships out of North Carolina for the 2016 season in response to the state's controversial HB2 law. The 2016 championship game was played at Camping World Stadium in Orlando, Florida.

== Teams ==
=== Clemson Tigers ===
The Tigers qualified for the game by winning the ACC Atlantic Division with a conference record of 7–1, tied with the Louisville Cardinals, who Clemson beat on October 1, 2016, 42–36.

=== Virginia Tech Hokies ===
The Hokies qualified for the game by clinching the ACC Coastal Division following North Carolina's loss at home on November 25, 2016, to NC State, 28–21. The Hokies' conference record was 6–2.

== Scoring summary ==
Scoring summary

Quarter	Time	Drive			Team	Scoring information	Score	
Quarter	Time	Plays	Yards	TOP	Team	Scoring information	Clemson	Va. Tech
1	11:47	9	75	3:13	Clemson	Deshaun Watson 3-yard touchdown run, Greg Huegel kick good	7	0
1	5:57	9	83	4:06	Clemson	Jordan Leggett 21-yard touchdown reception from Deshaun Watson, Greg Huegel kick good	14	0
1	0:51	12	77	5:06	Va. Tech	Travon McMillian 1-yard touchdown run, Joey Slye kick good	14	7
2	11:46	10	75	4:05	Clemson	Jordan Leggett 10-yard touchdown reception from Deshaun Watson, Greg Huegel kick good	21	7
2	4:09	5	70	1:58	Va. Tech	Jerod Evans 11-yard touchdown run, Joey Slye kick good	21	14
3	9:17	9	89	3:38	Clemson	Wayne Gallman 8-yard touchdown run, Greg Huegel kick good	28	14
3	4:45	4	51	1:19	Clemson	Deshaun Watson 2-yard touchdown run, Greg Huegel kick good	35	14
3	2:27	5	75	2:18	Va. Tech	Travon McMillian 27-yard touchdown run, Joey Slye kick good	35	21
4	11:35	12	65	4:24	Va. Tech	Jerod Evans 5-yard touchdown run, Joey Slye kick good	35	28
4	7:33	8	75	4:02	Clemson	Hunter Renfrow 15-yard touchdown reception from Deshaun Watson, Greg Huegel kick good	42	28
4	5:43	6	76	1:50	Va. Tech	Cam Phillips 26-yard touchdown reception from Jerod Evans, Joey Slye kick good	42	35
"TOP" = time of possession. For other American football terms, see Glossary of American football.							42	35

=== Statistics ===
Statistics	CU	VT
First downs	29	19
Total yards	470	386
Rushing Yards	182	102
Passing yards	288	284
Passing: Comp–Att–Int	23-34-1	22-36-2
Time of possession	31:52	28:08
