= Chris Fuller =

Chris or Christopher Fuller may refer to:

- Chris Fuller (squash player) (born 1990), English squash player
- Chris Fuller (director) (born 1982), American director
- Chris Fuller (academic), British professor of anthropology
