= Tavien Feaster =

American football player (born 1997)

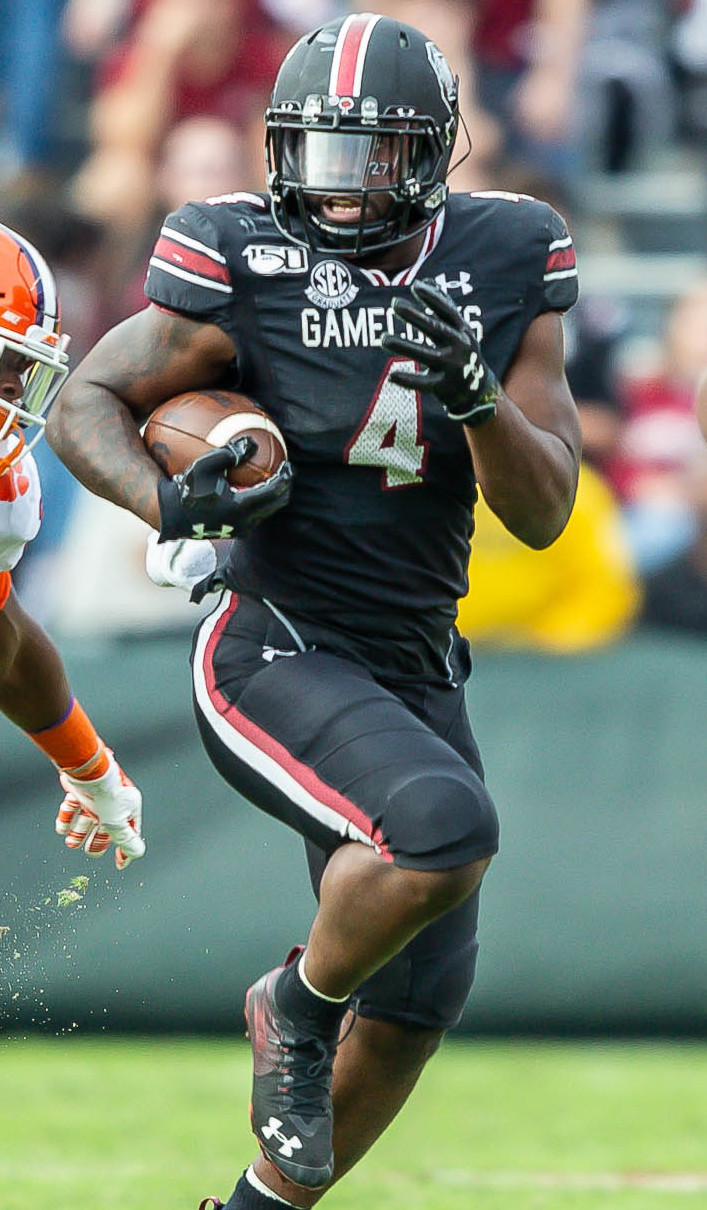
- Feaster with the South Carolina Gamecocks in 2019

No. 30, 40
- Position: Running back

Personal information
- Born: December 31, 1997 (age 28)
- Listed height: 6 ft 0 in (1.83 m)
- Listed weight: 221 lb (100 kg)

Career information
- High school: Spartanburg (Spartanburg, South Carolina)
- College: Clemson (2016–2018); South Carolina (2019)
- NFL draft: 2020: undrafted

Career history
- Jacksonville Jaguars (2020)*; New York Giants (2020)*; Detroit Lions (2020)*; Arizona Cardinals (2021); Montreal Alouettes (2022); BC Lions (2023)*
- * Offseason or practice squad member only

Awards and highlights
- 2× CFP national champion (2016, 2018)

Career CFL statistics
- Rushing attempts: 11
- Rushing yards: 62
- Stats at CFL.ca
- Stats at Pro Football Reference

Tavien Feaster (born December 31, 1997) is an American former professional football running back. He played college football for the Clemson Tigers and South Carolina Gamecocks.

== College career ==
Feaster began his collegiate career at Clemson. He rushed for 1,330 yards and 15 touchdowns and was part of the Tigers' 2016 and 2018 national championship teams. Feaster announced that he would be transferring to South Carolina as a graduate transfer following his junior season. He rushed 124 times for 572 yards and five touchdowns with 17 receptions for 87 yards in his lone season for the Gamecocks.

== Professional career ==
Pre-draft measurables
| Height | Weight | Arm length | Hand span |
|---|---|---|---|
| 5 ft 11 in (1.80 m) | 221 lb (100 kg) | 30 1/8 in (0.77 m) | 9 1/4 in (0.23 m) |
All values from Pro Day

=== Jacksonville Jaguars ===
Feaster was signed by the Jacksonville Jaguars as an undrafted free agent on April 27, 2020. He was released on August 8, 2020.

=== New York Giants ===
Feaster was signed by the New York Giants on August 27, 2020. He was waived on September 5, 2020, during final roster cuts.

=== Detroit Lions ===
Feaster was signed to the Detroit Lions' practice squad on October 7, 2020. The Lions released him on October 13, 2020.

=== Arizona Cardinals ===
Feaster signed a reserve/futures contract with the Arizona Cardinals on April 15, 2021. He was waived on August 31, 2021, at the end of training camp. The Cardinals re-signed Feaster to their practice squad on October 5, 2021. He was released on October 25, but was re-signed one week later on November 1. Feaster was signed to the Cardinals' active roster on November 13, 2021, after starter Chase Edmonds was placed on injured reserve. He was waived on November 15 and re-signed to the practice squad. He was promoted back to the active roster on November 20. He was waived on November 22 and re-signed to the practice squad. He was again promoted back to the active roster on December 4. He was waived again on December 7 and re-signed to the practice squad.
