= Xavier Kelly =

American football player (born 1997)

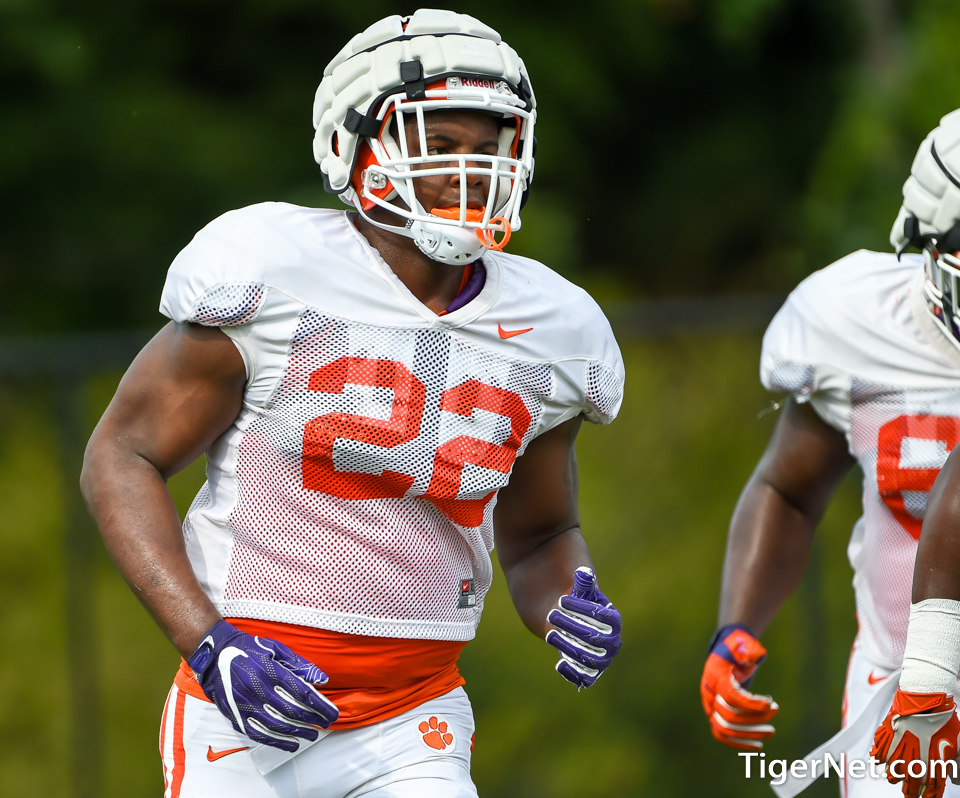

Profile
- Position: Defensive tackle

Personal information
- Born: October 2, 1997 (age 29); Wichita, Kansas, U.S.
- Listed height: 6 ft 5 in (1.96 m)
- Listed weight: 311 lb (141 kg)

Career information
- High school: Wichita East (Wichita, Kansas)
- College: Clemson (2017–2019); Arkansas (2020)
- NFL draft: 2021: undrafted

Career history
- Baltimore Ravens (2021)

Awards and highlights
- CFP national champion (2018)

Xavier Kelly (born October 2, 1997) is an American former football defensive tackle. He played college football at Arkansas.

== Professional career ==
=== Baltimore Ravens ===
Kelly went undrafted in the 2021 NFL draft. On May 1, 2021, he signed with the Baltimore Ravens as an undrafted free agent. On May 27, Kelly suffered a torn achilles while at practice, which prematurely ended his rookie season. He was waived with injuries on June 1, 2021, but was reverted to injured reserve the following day. He was waived on May 11, 2022.
