= Chris Fuller (academic) =

British anthropologist

Professor Emeritus C. J. Fuller FBA

Academic work
- Discipline: Anthropology
- Institutions: London School of Economics
- Notable works: The Nayars Today

Christopher John Fuller is an emeritus professor of anthropology at the London School of Economics and a Fellow of the British Academy. He has studied and written extensively about the people of India, particularly with regard to subjects such as Hinduism, the caste system, and the relationship between globalisation and the middle-classes.

== Career ==
Fuller was a lecturer in the Department of Social Anthropology at the University of Manchester prior to holding a similar position as lecturer in anthropology at the London School of Economics (LSE) between 1979 and 1987. He was a reader in anthropology at the LSE between 1987 and 1994 and has been an emeritus professor of anthropology there since 2009.

Fuller's primary area of field research has been the state of Tamil Nadu, particularly between 1976 and 2001 at the Hindu temple in Madurai that is dedicated to Minakshi. His first fieldwork was among the Nair and Syrian Christian communities of Kerala in 1971–72. Fuller has also conducted fieldwork in Chennai (middle-class managers and software professionals, 2003–05) and on Tamil Brahmins (2005–08). Other areas of research have examined popular Hinduism and Hindu nationalism, the caste system and the history of anthropology in British India.

Fuller was elected a Fellow of the British Academy in 2007.

== Publications ==
Fuller's publications include:

- The Nayars Today. Cambridge University Press. 1976.
- Servants of the goddess: the priests of a south Indian temple. Cambridge University Press. 1984.
- The Everyday State and Society in Modern India. C. Hurst & Co. 2001. (co-editor, with Véronique Bénéï)
- The renewal of the priesthood: modernity and traditionalism in a south Indian temple. Princeton University Press. 2003.
- The camphor flame: popular Hinduism and society in India (Revised and expanded ed.). Princeton University Press. 2004.
- Tamil Brahmans: the making of a middle-class caste. University of Chicago Press. 2014. (with Haripriya Narasimhan)
- Fuller, C. J. (2016). "Anthropologists and Viceroys: Colonial Knowledge and Policy Making in India, 1871–1911". Modern Asian Studies. 50 (1): 217–58. doi:10.1017/s0026749x15000037. S2CID 146712949.
- Fuller, C. J. (2016). "Colonial anthropology and the decline of the Raj: caste, religion and political change in India in the early twentieth century". Journal of the Royal Asiatic Society. 26 (3): 463–86. doi:10.1017/s1356186315000486. S2CID 157384140.
