= Samantha Ponder =

American sportscaster

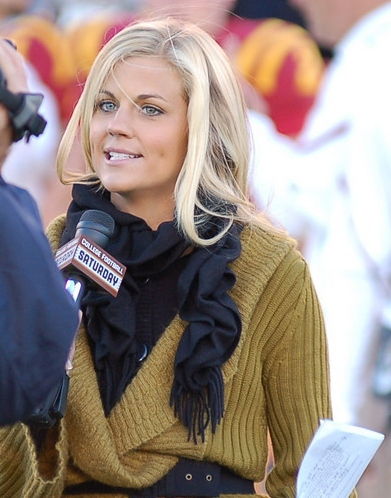
- Ponder reporting for Fox College Sports at Jack Trice Stadium in October 2010
- Born: Samantha Sainte-Claire Steele; December 11, 1985 (age 40); Phoenix, Arizona, U.S.
- Education: The King’s College; Liberty University
- Occupation: Former ESPN Sunday NFL Countdown host
- Years active: 2006–present
- Spouse: Christian Ponder (m. 2012)
- Children: 3

Samantha Ponder (née Steele; born December 11, 1985) is an American sportscaster who most recently hosted Sunday NFL Countdown on ESPN. Prior to hosting the show, Ponder worked as a reporter and host for ESPN college football and as a basketball sideline reporter. Ponder replaced Erin Andrews on College GameDay Saturdays at 10 AM ET on ESPN, as well as co-host of the Saturday 9 AM ET edition on ESPNU. In addition to her duties on College Gameday, Ponder had been the regular sideline reporter for ESPN's Thursday Night College Football with Rece Davis, Jesse Palmer, and David Pollack from August 2012 until 2014. Ponder also appeared on the ESPN-owned Texas-oriented regional network Longhorn Network.

== Biography ==
Born in Phoenix, Arizona, Ponder attended Central High School in Phoenix. Ponder first attended The King's College in New York City after high school. While in New York City, she applied for a hostess job at ESPN Zone where she met Ben Keeperman, a college football researcher and manager with ABC Sports Radio, which led to an internship at the network, which in turn led to a researcher-assistant job with ABC-TV on the college football studio show. She transferred to Liberty University after Liberty's Sr. Sports Producer Bruce Carey offered her a job as sideline reporter for the Liberty Flames sports television network. After graduating in 2009, she worked for Fox Sports Net and Fox College Sports as a sideline reporter for Pac-10 and Big 12 college basketball and football games. On July 7, 2011, ESPN's Longhorn Network announced that it had hired Ponder as a sideline reporter. Ponder, along with Kevin Dunn and Lowell Galindo, were the newly created network's first three talent hires. After accepting her position with the Longhorn Network, Ponder relocated to Austin, Texas. In August 2024, ESPN fired Ponder, removing her as host of Sunday NFL Countdown.

== Personal life ==
Ponder is a Christian. After briefly dating, she married then-Minnesota Vikings quarterback Christian Ponder on December 17, 2012, in Hudson, Wisconsin. She started appearing on ESPN/ABC broadcasts by her married name, starting with the January 1, 2013 broadcast of the CapitalOne Bowl. They have three children.
