= Wayne Gallman =

American football player (born 1994)

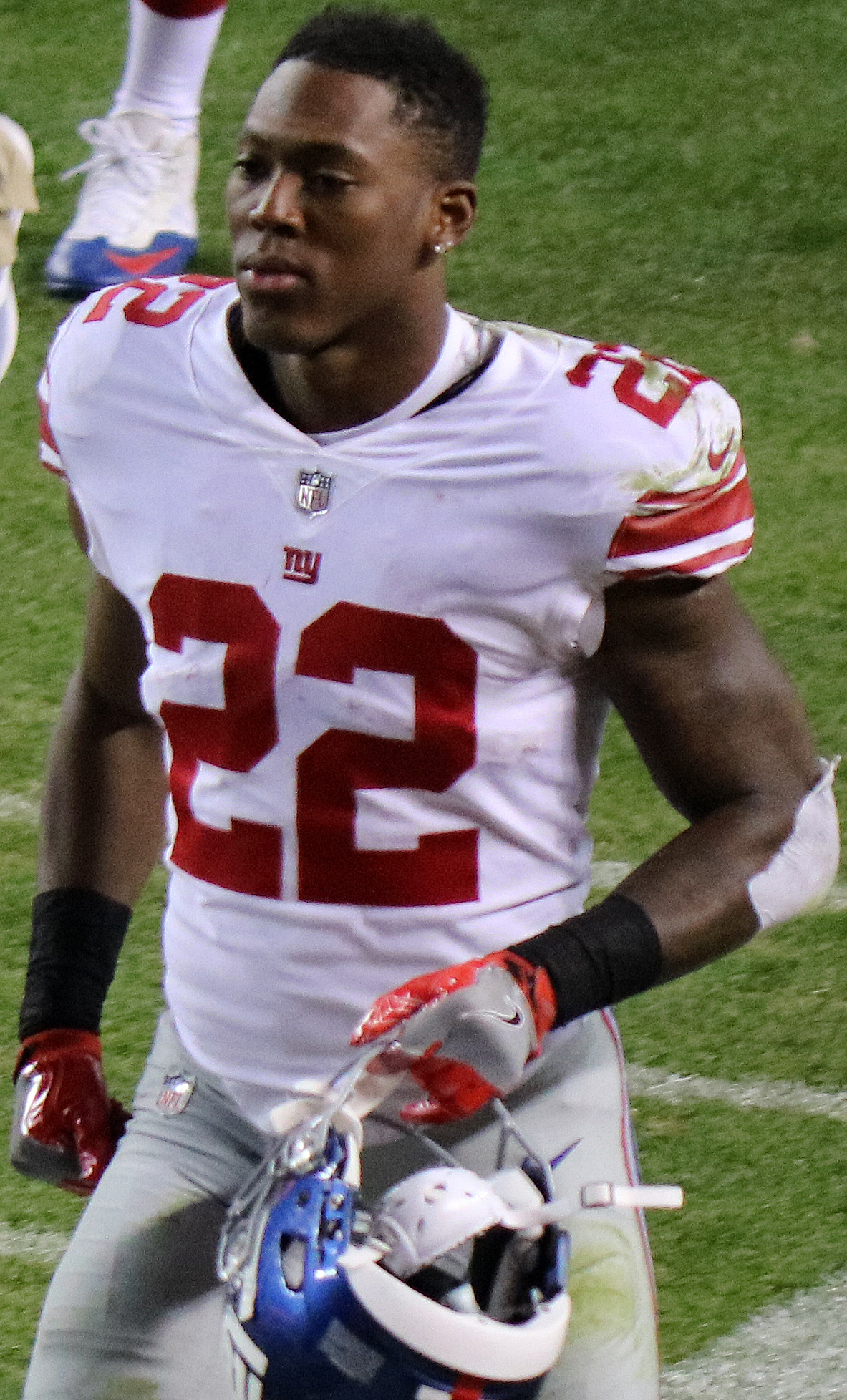
- Gallman with the New York Giants in 2017

Profile
- Position: Running back

Personal information
- Born: October 1, 1994 (age 32); Loganville, Georgia, U.S.
- Listed height: 6 ft 0 in (1.83 m)
- Listed weight: 210 lb (95 kg)

Career information
- High school: Grayson (Loganville)
- College: Clemson (2013–2016)
- NFL draft: 2017: 4th round, 140th overall pick

Career history
- New York Giants (2017–2020); San Francisco 49ers (2021)*; Atlanta Falcons (2021); Minnesota Vikings (2021); Kansas City Chiefs (2022)*; Seattle Seahawks (2022); St. Louis Battlehawks (2024)
- * Offseason or practice squad member only

Awards and highlights
- CFP national champion (2017); 2× Second-team All-ACC (2015, 2016)

Career NFL statistics
- Rushing yards: 1,548
- Rushing average: 4.2
- Rushing touchdowns: 9
- Receptions: 81
- Receiving yards: 519
- Receiving touchdowns: 2
- Stats at Pro Football Reference

Wayne Gallman Jr. (born October 1, 1994) is an American professional football running back. He played college football for the Clemson Tigers and contributed to win the CFP national championship (2017) before being selected by the New York Giants in the fourth round of the 2017 NFL draft.

== Early life ==
Gallman attended Grayson High School in Loganville, Georgia, where he played high school football. He was teammates with Robert Nkemdiche and Austin Meadows of the Tampa Bay Rays. He was rated by Rivals.com as a three-star recruit and committed to Clemson University to play college football.

== College career ==
Gallman attended and played college football for Clemson from 2013 to 2016. He redshirted during his first year at Clemson in 2013. Gallman played in all 13 games in 2014 as a redshirt freshman and made nine starts. He made his collegiate debut in a loss at Georgia. On October 18, 2014, in a game against Boston College, he scored his first collegiate rushing touchdown. On October 6, he had 106 rushing yards, one rushing touchdown, 43 receiving yards, and one receiving touchdown in a breakout performance against Wake Forest. In the regular season finale against South Carolina, he had 191 rushing yards and a rushing touchdown in the annual rivalry game. He finished the season with 769 yards on 161 carries and four touchdowns.

Gallman entered his sophomore year in 2015 as the starter. As a redshirt sophomore in 2015, Gallman played in 14 games. In the season opener against Wofford, he had 92 rushing yards and two rushing touchdowns. On Halloween, against North Carolina State, he had 172 rushing yards and a rushing touchdown. In the Atlantic Coast Conference Championship against North Carolina, he had 187 rushing yards, one rushing touchdown, and four receptions for 68 receiving yards and a receiving touchdown as part of a strong performance. Clemson's successful season qualified them for the College Football Playoff. In the Orange Bowl against Oklahoma in the National Semifinals, he had 150 rushing yards and two rushing touchdowns in the victory. In the 2016 College Football Playoff National Championship against Alabama, he had 45 rushing yards and a rushing touchdown to go along with three receptions for 61 yards in the 45–40 loss. Overall, he finished the season with 1,514 rushing yards and 13 touchdowns.

As a redshirt junior in 2016, Gallman played 15 games with 1,133 rushing yards and 17 touchdowns. In the season opener, he had 123 rushing yards and a touchdown in the victory at Auburn. On November 12, against Pittsburgh, he was held to 36 rushing yards but had three rushing touchdowns in Clemson's lone loss of the season. He bounced back in the next game with 161 rushing yards and two rushing touchdowns in the victory at Wake Forest. Clemson returned to the College Football Playoff that year. In the Fiesta Bowl against Ohio State in the National Semifinals, he had 85 rushing yards and a rushing touchdown. He was part of the Clemson team that defeated Alabama in the 2017 College Football Playoff National Championship by a score of 35–31. In the game, he had 18 carries for 46 yards and a touchdown. In addition, he had three receptions for 39 yards After the 2016 season, Gallman decided to forgo his senior year and enter the 2017 NFL draft.

=== College statistics ===
Year	School	Conf	Class	Pos	G	Rushing				Receiving			
Year	School	Conf	Class	Pos	G	Att	Yds	Avg	TD	Rec	Yds	Avg	TD
2014	Clemson	ACC	FR	RB	13	161	769	4.8	4	24	108	4.5	1
2015	Clemson	ACC	SO	RB	14	282	1,514	5.4	13	22	226	10.3	1
2016	Clemson	ACC	JR	RB	15	232	1,133	4.9	17	20	152	7.6	0
Career	Clemson				42	675	3,416	5.1	34	66	486	7.4	2

== Professional career ==
Pre-draft measurables
Height	Weight	Arm length	Hand span	40-yard dash	10-yard split	20-yard split	20-yard shuttle	Three-cone drill	Vertical jump	Broad jump	Bench press
6 ft 0 1/2 in (1.84 m)	215 lb (98 kg)	32 5/8 in (0.83 m)	9 1/8 in (0.23 m)	4.51 s	1.69 s	2.68 s	4.28 s	7.17 s	30.5 in (0.77 m)	10 ft 0 in (3.05 m)	21 reps
All values from NFL Combine/Pro Day

=== New York Giants ===
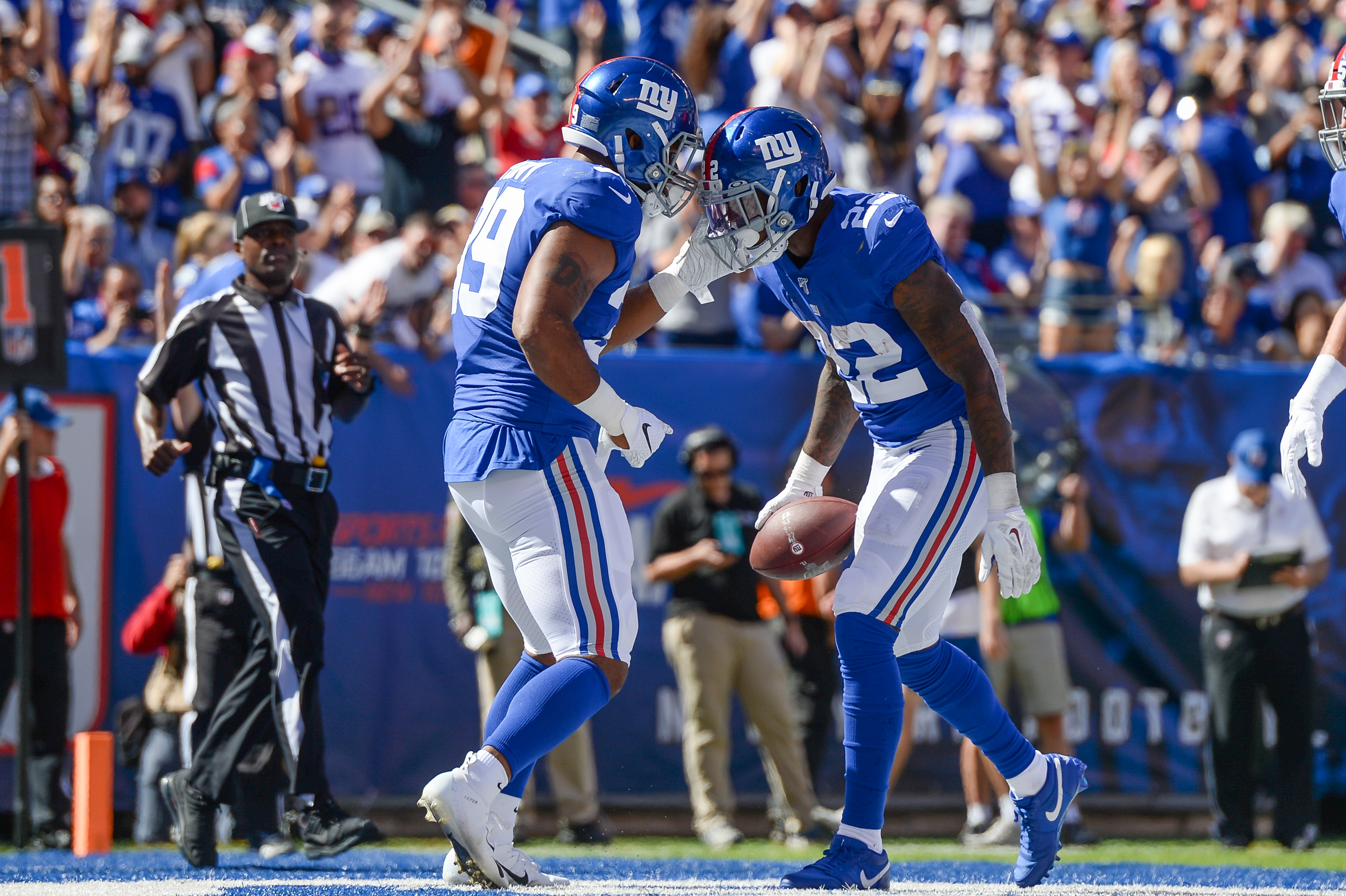
Gallman in a game against the Washington Redskins

Gallman was selected by the New York Giants in the fourth round, 140th overall, in the 2017 NFL draft. He was the 14th running back selected in that year's draft. Gallman made his NFL debut and scored his first NFL touchdown on October 1, 2017, in a loss to the Tampa Bay Buccaneers. This game coincided with his 23rd birthday. Overall, in his rookie season, he finished with 476 rushing yards to go along with 34 receptions for 193 receiving yards and a receiving touchdown. Gallman scored his first rushing touchdown in Week 17 against the Dallas Cowboys on a one-yard run. Overall, he finished the 2018 season with 176 rushing yards and a singular rushing touchdown.

In Week 4 of the 2019 season against the Washington Redskins, Gallman made his first start of the season due to an injury suffered by Saquon Barkley. In the game, Gallman rushed 18 times for 63 yards and a touchdown and caught six passes for 55 yards and a touchdown in the 24–3 win. Overall, Gallman finished the 2019 season with 29 carries for 110 rushing yards and two rushing touchdowns to go along with 11 receptions for 102 receiving yards and one receiving touchdown.

Gallman began the 2020 season as a backup to Barkley, but became the starting running back after Barkley was placed on injured reserve after Week 2. In Week 10 of the 2020 season against the Philadelphia Eagles, Gallman rushed 15 times for 53 yards and rushed for a career-high two touchdowns in a 27–17 win. In Week 13 against the Seattle Seahawks, Gallman rushed for 135 yards during the 17–12 win. Gallman finished the 2020 season with career-highs with 147 carries for 682 yards and six touchdowns along with 34 receptions for 193 yards and one receiving touchdown. Gallman became a free agent after the year.

=== San Francisco 49ers ===
On April 21, 2021, Gallman signed a one-year contract with the San Francisco 49ers. On August 31, the 49ers released Gallman as a part of final roster cutdowns.

=== Atlanta Falcons ===
On September 2, 2021, Gallman signed with the Atlanta Falcons. He was released by the Falcons on December 11.

=== Minnesota Vikings ===
On December 13, 2021, Gallman was claimed off waivers by the Minnesota Vikings. With the Falcons and Vikings, he appeared in eight total games during the 2021 season. Gallman had 28 carries for 104 rushing yards.

=== Kansas City Chiefs ===
Gallman signed with the practice squad of the Kansas City Chiefs on October 12, 2022. He was released by the Chiefs on November 29.

=== Seattle Seahawks ===
Gallman signed with the practice squad of the Seattle Seahawks on December 6, 2022. He was released by the Seahawks on December 15. Gallman re-signed with Seattle on December 20. His practice squad contract with the team expired after the season on January 14, 2023.

=== St. Louis Battlehawks ===
On January 30, 2024, Gallman signed with the St. Louis Battlehawks of the United Football League (UFL).
