= Greg Huegel =

American football player (born 1995)

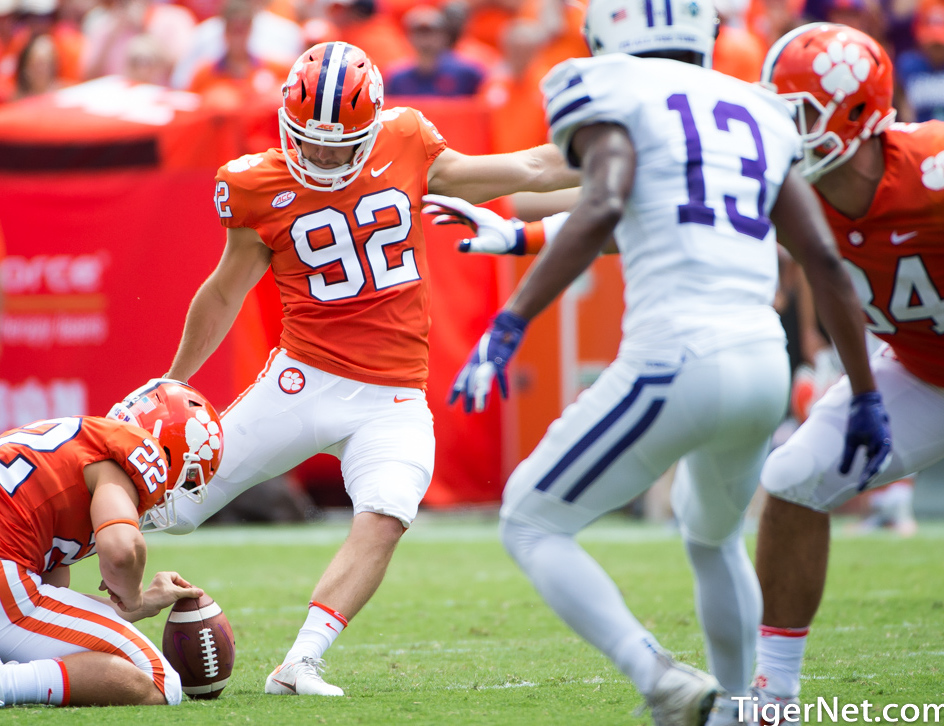

No. 92
- Position: Placekicker

Personal information
- Born: November 10, 1995 (age 30); Blythewood, South Carolina, U.S.
- Listed height: 5 ft 10 in (1.78 m)
- Listed weight: 195 lb (88 kg)

Career information
- High school: Blythewood (SC) High
- College: Clemson University (2014–2018)

Awards and highlights
- 2× CFP national champion (2016, 2018); Second-team All-American (2015); 2× Second-team All-ACC (2015, 2016)
- Stats at ESPN

Greg Huegel (born November 10, 1995) is an American former football placekicker who played for the Clemson Tigers.

== Career ==
Huegel was part of the Clemson team that defeated Alabama in the 2017 College Football Playoff National Championship by a score of 35–31. In the game, he converted all five extra point attempts.
