= 2019 Southeastern Conference football season =

- League: NCAA Division I Football Bowl Subdivision
- Sport: Football
- Duration: August 29, 2019 through January 2020
- Teams: 14
- TV partner(s): CBS Sports Family (CBS, CBSSN), ESPN Family (ESPN, ESPN2, ESPN3, ESPNU, SEC, ABC, ESPN+)

2020 NFL Draft
- Top draft pick: Joe Burrow (LSU)
- Picked by: Cincinnati Bengals, 1st overall

Regular season
- East champions: Georgia
- East runners-up: Florida
- West champions: LSU
- West runners-up: Alabama

SEC Championship Game
- Champions: LSU
- Runners-up: Georgia
- Finals MVP: Joe Burrow, QB

Football seasons
- 2018 2020

2019 Southeastern Conference football standings
	Conf.			Overall
Team	W		L	W		L
Eastern Division
No. 4 Georgia x	7	–	1	12	–	2
No. 6 Florida	6	–	2	11	–	2
Tennessee *	5	–	3	8	–	5
Kentucky	3	–	5	8	–	5
Missouri *	3	–	5	6	–	6
South Carolina	3	–	5	4	–	8
Vanderbilt	1	–	7	3	–	9
Western Division
No. 1 LSU x$#^	8	–	0	15	–	0
No. 8 Alabama	6	–	2	11	–	2
No. 14 Auburn	5	–	3	9	–	4
Texas A&M	4	–	4	8	–	5
Mississippi State	3	–	5	6	–	7
Ole Miss	2	–	6	4	–	8
Arkansas	0	–	8	2	–	10
Championship: LSU 37, Georgia 10
# – College Football Playoff champion; ^ – College Football Playoff participant; $ – Conference champion; x – Division champion/co-champions; * – Tennessee vacated all wins due to NCAA violations. Missouri was ineligible for postseason due to NCAA sanctions.; Rankings from AP Poll

The 2019 Southeastern Conference football season represented the 87th season of SEC football taking place during the 2019 NCAA Division I FBS football season. The season began on August 29, 2019 and ended with the 2019 SEC Championship Game on December 7, 2019. The SEC is a Power Five conference under the College Football Playoff format along with the Atlantic Coast Conference, the Big 12 Conference, the Big Ten Conference and the Pac-12 Conference. For the 2019 season the SEC has 14 teams divided into two divisions of seven each, named East and West.

== Background ==
Alabama brought back quarterback Tua Tagovailoa while Georgia brought back quarterback Jake Fromm. Georgia lost their defensive coordinator; Mel Tucker to Colorado as their head coach after he spent the last two seasons at Georgia after leaving Alabama with Kirby Smart. Tennessee quarterback Will McBride transferred from Tennessee thus ending his stint with the team leaving Tennessee to have a quarterback competition for the starting quarterback job. LSU added the top recruited running back in the nation, John Emery to its running back corps for the season. Missouri played a three game SEC road trip during the 2019 season and they will open the season against Wyoming.

== Preseason ==
=== Recruiting classes ===
National Rankings
Team	ESPN	Rivals	Scout & 24/7	Total Signees
Alabama	#1	#2	#1	27
Arkansas	#26	#20	#23	25
Auburn	#9	#13	#11	21
Florida	#13	#8	#9	25
Georgia	#3	#2	#2	24
Kentucky	#30	#30	#34	22
LSU	#7	#3	#5	25
Ole Miss	#21	#22	#22	31
Mississippi State	#24	#24	#24	21
Missouri	#54	#48	#40	24
South Carolina	#19	#16	#21	24
Tennessee	#15	#12	#12	23
Texas A&M	#11	#6	#4	27
Vanderbilt	#60	#57	#69	20

=== SEC media days ===
The 2019 SEC Media Days took place at the Hyatt Regency Birmingham - Wynfrey Hotel in Hoover, Alabama on July 15–18.

The preseason Polls were released in July 2019. With the Crimson Tide predicted to win the West Division, the Bulldogs predicted to win the East Division, and the Crimson Tide predicted to win the SEC overall.

East
Predicted finish	Team	Votes (1st place)
1	Georgia	1789 (233)
2	Florida	1499 (21)
3	Missouri	1149 (3)
4	South Carolina	883 (1)
5	Tennessee	804 (1)
6	Kentucky	798 (1)
7	Vanderbilt	358

West
Predicted finish	Team	Votes (1st place)
1	Alabama	1813 (253)
2	LSU	1493 (5)
3	Texas A&M	1268
4	Auburn	1090 (1)
5	Mississippi State	769 (1)
6	Ole Miss	504
7	Arkansas	343

Media poll (SEC Championship)
Predicted finish	Team	Votes
1	Alabama	209
2	Georgia	49
3	LSU	3
4	Mississippi State	1

=== Preseason awards ===
==== Preseason All-SEC media ====
First Team Offense
Position	Player	Class	Team
QB	Tua Tagovailoa	JR	Alabama
RB	Najee Harris	JR	Alabama
RB	D'Andre Swift	JR	Georgia
WR	Jerry Jeudy	JR	Alabama
WR	Henry Ruggs	JR	Alabama
TE	Albert Okwuegbunam	RS JR	Missouri
OL	Alex Leatherwood	JR	Alabama
OL	Andrew Thomas	JR	Georgia
OL	Prince Tega Wanogho	SR	Auburn
OL	Jedrick Wills	JR	Alabama
C	Lloyd Cushenberry	JR	LSU

First Team Defense
Position	Player	Class	Team
DL	Raekwon Davis	SR	Alabama
DL	Derrick Brown	SR	Auburn
DL	Rashard Lawrence	SR	LSU
DL	Jabari Zuniga	RS SR	Florida
LB	Dylan Moses	JR	Alabama
LB	Anfernee Jennings	RS SR	Alabama
LB	Errol Thompson	JR	Mississippi State
DB	Grant Delpit	JR	LSU
DB	J. R. Reed	SR	Georgia
DB	Trevon Diggs	SR	Alabama
DB	C. J. Henderson	JR	Florida

First Team Special Teams
Position	Player	Class	Team
P	Braden Mann	SR	Texas A&M
K	Rodrigo Blankenship	RS SR	Georgia
AP	Jaylen Waddle	SO	Alabama
AP	Jaylen Waddle	SO	Alabama

==== Preseason All-SEC coaches ====
First Team Offense
Position	Player	Class	Team
QB	Tua Tagovailoa	JR	Alabama
RB	Najee Harris	JR	Alabama
RB	D'Andre Swift	JR	Georgia
WR	Jerry Jeudy	JR	Alabama
WR	Kalija Lipscomb	SR	Vanderbilt
WR	Jaylen Waddle	SO	Alabama
TE	Albert Okwuegbunam	RS JR	Missouri
OL	Alex Leatherwood	JR	Alabama
OL	Andrew Thomas	JR	Georgia
OL	Prince Tega Wanogho	SR	Auburn
OL	Jedrick Wills	JR	Alabama
OL	Tre'Vour Wallace-Simms	SR	Missouri
C	Lloyd Cushenberry	JR	LSU

First Team Defense
Position	Player	Class	Team
DL	Raekwon Davis	SR	Alabama
DL	Derrick Brown	SR	Auburn
DL	Rashard Lawrence	SR	LSU
DL	Justin Madubuike	JR	Texas A&M
LB	Dylan Moses	JR	Alabama
LB	Cale Garrett	SR	Missouri
LB	Errol Thompson	JR	Mississippi State
DB	Grant Delpit	JR	LSU
DB	J. R. Reed	SR	Georgia
DB	Trevon Diggs	SR	Alabama
DB	C. J. Henderson	JR	Florida
DB	Kristian Fulton	JR	LSU

First Team Special Teams
Position	Player	Class	Team
P	Braden Mann	SR	Texas A&M
K	Rodrigo Blankenship	SO	Georgia
RS	Jaylen Waddle	SO	Alabama

Second Team Offense
Position	Player	Class	Team
QB	Jake Fromm	JR	Georgia
RB	Ke'Shawn Vaughn	RS SR	Vanderbilt
RB	La'Mical Perine	JR	Florida
WR	Henry Ruggs	JR	Alabama
WR	Lynn Bowden	JR	Kentucky
WR	Bryan Edwards	JR	South Carolina
TE	Jared Pinkney	RS SR	Vanderbilt
OL	Damien Lewis	SR	LSU
OL	Logan Stenberg	SR	Kentucky
OL	Solomon Kindley	JR	Georgia
OL	Isaiah Wilson	RS SO	Georgia
C	Darryl Williams	SR	Mississippi State

Second Team Defense
Position	Player	Class	Team
DL	Jabari Zuniga	RS JR	Florida
DL	Marlon Davidson	SR	Auburn
DL	Javon Kinlaw	SR	South Carolina
DL	Nick Coe	JR	Auburn
LB	Anfernee Jennings	RS SR	Alabama
LB	De'Jon Harris	SR	Arkansas
LB	David Reese II	SR	Florida
DB	Xavier McKinney	JR	Alabama
DB	Patrick Surtain II	SO	Alabama
DB	DeMarkus Acy	SR	Missouri
DB	Cameron Dantzler	JR	Mississippi State

Second Team Special Teams
Position	Player	Class	Team
P	Tommy Townsend	RS JR	Florida
K	Evan McPherson	RS SR	Florida
RS	Jashaun Corbin	SO	Texas A&M
RS	Marquez Callaway	SR	Tennessee

Third Team Offense
Position	Player	Class	Team
QB	Kellen Mond	JR	Texas A&M
RB	Larry Rountree III	JR	Missouri
RB	Kylin Hill	JR	Mississippi State
RB	Jashuan Corbin	SO	Texas A&M
WR	Jaylen Waddle	SO	Alabama
WR	Lynn Bowden	JR	Vanderbilt
WR	Justin Jefferson	JR	LSU
TE	Charlie Woerner	Senior	Georgia
OL	Yasir Durant	SR	Missouri
OL	Ben Cleveland	JR	Georgia
OL	Matt Womack	RS SR	Alabama
OL	Marquel Harrell	SR	Auburn
C	Mike Horton	SR	Auburn
OL	Drake Jackson	JR	Kentucky

Third Team Defense
Position	Player	Class	Team
DL	McTelvin Agim	SR	Arkansas
DL	Chauncey Rivers	SR	Mississippi State
DL	Tyler Clark	SR	Georgia
DL	LaBryan Ray	JR	Alabama
DL	Dayo Odeyingbo	JR	Vanderbilt
DL	Jordan Elliott	RS JR	Missouri
LB	Michael Divinity	SR	LSU
LB	T. J. Brunson	SR	South Carolina
LB	Darrell Taylor	RS SR	Tennessee
LB	Jacob Phillips	JR	LSU
DB	Daniel Thomas	SR	Auburn
DB	Nigel Warrior	SR	Tennessee
DB	Shyheim Carter	SR	Alabama
DB	Kamren Curl	JR	Arkansas
DB	Jaycee Horn	SO	South Carolina
DB	Javaris Davis	SR	Auburn

Third Team Special Teams
Position	Player	Class	Team
P	Zach Von Rosenberg	JR	LSU
K	Tucker McCann	SR	Missouri
K	Anders Carlson	SO	Auburn
RS	Lynn Bowden	JR	Kentucky

== Head coaches ==
School	Coach	Year
Alabama	Nick Saban	13th
Arkansas	Chad Morris	2nd
Auburn	Gus Malzahn	7th
Florida	Dan Mullen	2nd
Georgia	Kirby Smart	4th
Kentucky	Mark Stoops	7th
LSU	Ed Orgeron	3rd
Mississippi State	Joe Moorhead	2nd
Missouri	Barry Odom	4th
Ole Miss	Matt Luke	3rd
South Carolina	Will Muschamp	4th
Tennessee	Jeremy Pruitt	2nd
Texas A&M	Jimbo Fisher	2nd
Vanderbilt	Derek Mason	6th

== Rankings ==
		Pre	Wk 1	Wk 2	Wk 3	Wk 4	Wk 5	Wk 6	Wk 7	Wk 8	Wk 9	Wk 10	Wk 11	Wk 12	Wk 13	Wk 14	Wk 15	Final
Alabama	AP	2 (10)	2 (8)	2 (6)	2 (5)	2 (6)	1 (29)	1 (32)	1 (30)	1 (24)	2 (21)	2 (21)	4	5	5	9	9	8
Alabama	C	2 (6)	2 (6)	2 (3)	2 (3)	2 (2)	1 (29)	1 (42)	1 (44)	1 (44)	1 (40)	1 (37)	4	5	5	9	9	8
Alabama	CFP	Not released										3	5	5	5	12	13	
Arkansas	AP																	
Arkansas	C																	
Arkansas	CFP	Not released																
Auburn	AP	16	10	8	8	7	7 (3)	12	11	9	11	12	13	16	16	11	9	14
Auburn	C	16	13	9	9	7	7	12	11	10	12	12	13	16	16	12	13	14
Auburn	CFP	Not released										11	12	15	15	11	12	
Florida	AP	8	11	9	9	9	10	7	9	7	6	10	11	10	8	7	6	6
Florida	C	8	10	8	8	8	8	7	9	8	6	11	12	10	8	7	7	7
Florida	CFP	Not released										10	11	11	11	9	9	
Georgia	AP	3	3	3	3	3 (1)	3 (4)	3 (3)	10	10	8	6	5	4	4	4	5	4
Georgia	C	3	3	3	3	3 (1)	3 (1)	3	10	9	7	6	5	4	4	4	5	4
Georgia	CFP	Not released										6	4	4	4	4	5	
Kentucky	AP			RV														RV
Kentucky	C	RV	RV	RV	RV												RV	RV
Kentucky	CFP	Not released																
LSU	AP	6	6	4	4	4	5	5 (2)	2 (12)	2 (16)	1 (17)	1 (17)	1 (54)	1 (54)	1 (50)	1 (40)	1 (47)	1 (62)
LSU	C	6	6	5	5	5	6	6	3 (3)	3 (3)	2 (7)	2 (11)	1 (55)	1 (55)	1 (52)	1 (43)	1 (46)	1 (65)
LSU	CFP	Not released										2	1	1	2	2	1	
Mississippi State	AP	RV	RV	RV	RV	RV												
Mississippi State	C	RV	RV	23	RV	RV	RV	RV										
Mississippi State	CFP	Not released																
Missouri	AP	RV				RV	RV	RV	22	RV								
Missouri	C	*	*	*	*	*	*	*	*	*	*	*	*	*	*	*	*	*
Missouri	CFP	Not released																
Ole Miss	AP																	
Ole Miss	C	RV																
Ole Miss	CFP	Not released																
South Carolina	AP	RV							RV									
South Carolina	C	RV							RV									
South Carolina	CFP	Not released																
Tennessee	AP																	RV
Tennessee	C	RV														RV	RV	RV
Tennessee	CFP	Not released																
Texas A&M	AP	12	12	16	17	23	25	24	RV	RV	RV	RV	RV	24	RV		RV	RV
Texas A&M	C	11	11	15	15	21	21	21	RV	RV	RV	RV	RV	24	RV			RV
Texas A&M	CFP	Not released																
Vanderbilt	AP																	
Vanderbilt	C																	
Vanderbilt	CFP	Not released																

* – Missouri ineligible for Coaches' Poll per NCAA sanctions due to academic misconduct.

Legend
	Improvement in ranking
	Drop in ranking
	Not ranked previous week
	No change in ranking from previous week
RV	Received votes but were not ranked in Top 25 of poll
т	Tied with team above or below also with this symbol

== Schedule ==
Index to colors and formatting
Non-conference matchup; SEC member won
Non-conference matchup; SEC member lost
Conference matchup

All times Eastern time. SEC teams in bold.

Rankings reflect those of the AP poll for that week until week eleven when CFP rankings are used.

=== Regular season ===
The Regular season began on August 29 and will end on November 30. 2018. Southeastern Conference champion Alabama opened their 2019 conference play against South Carolina on September 14, 2019 while 2018 Southeastern Conference East champion Georgia opened their 2019 conference play against Vanderbilt on August 31. Florida and Auburn will renew their rivalry after an eight year hiatus when they meet on October 5, 2019 in Gainesville. That matchup will also be the first time that Auburn plays in Gainesville since 2007 when Auburn defeated Florida 20-17. Florida will also be resuming another rivalry; their rivalry with Miami as they open the season against the Hurricanes in Orlando.

==== Week Zero ====
Date	Time	Visiting team	Home team	Site	TV	Result	Attendance	Ref.
August 24	7:00 p.m.	Miami (FL)	No. 8 **Florida**	Camping World Stadium • Orlando, FL (Camping World Kickoff / rivalry)	ESPN	**W** 20–24	66,543	
^{#}Rankings from AP Poll released prior to game. All times are in Eastern Time.

==== Week One ====
Date	Time	Visiting team	Home team	Site	TV	Result	Attendance	Ref.
August 29	8:30 p.m.	Texas State	No. 12 **Texas A&M**	Kyle Field • College Station, TX	SECN	**W** 7–41	98,016	
August 31	Noon	Toledo	**Kentucky**	Kroger Field • Lexington, KY	SECN	**W** 24–38	54,610	
August 31	Noon	**Ole Miss**	Memphis	Liberty Bowl Memorial Stadium • Memphis, TN (rivalry)	ABC	**L** 10–15	44,107	
August 31	Noon	**Mississippi State**	Louisiana	Mercedes-Benz Superdome • New Orleans, LA	ESPNU	**W** 38-28	22,440	
August 31	3:30 p.m.	**South Carolina**	North Carolina	Bank of America Stadium • Charlotte, NC (Belk Kickoff Game / rivalry)	ESPN	**L** 20–24	52,183	
August 31	3:30 p.m.	Duke	No. 2 **Alabama**	Mercedes-Benz Stadium • Atlanta, GA (Chick-fil-A Kickoff Game)	ABC	**W** 3–42	71,916	
August 31	3:30 p.m.	Georgia State	**Tennessee**	Neyland Stadium • Knoxville, TN	ESPNU	**L** 38–30	85,503	
August 31	4:00 p.m.	Portland State	**Arkansas**	Donald W. Reynolds Razorback Stadium • Fayetteville, AR	SECN	**W** 13–20	61,055	
August 31	7:00 p.m.	Georgia Southern	No. 6 **LSU**	Tiger Stadium • Baton Rouge, LA	SECN	**W** 3–55	97,420	
August 31	7:30 p.m.	**Missouri**	Wyoming	War Memorial Stadium • Laramie, WY	CBSSN	**L** 31–37	26,037	
August 31	7:30 p.m.	No. 11 Oregon	No. 16 **Auburn**	AT&T Stadium • Arlington, TX (Advocare Classic)	ABC	**W** 21–27	60,662	
August 31	7:30 p.m.	No. 3 **Georgia**	**Vanderbilt**	Vanderbilt Stadium • Nashville, TN (rivalry)	ESPN	**UGA** 30–6	40,350	
^{#}Rankings from AP Poll released prior to game. All times are in Eastern Time.

==== Week Two ====
Date	Time	Visiting team	Home team	Site	TV	Result	Attendance	Ref.
September 7	Noon	West Virginia	**Missouri**	Faurot Field • Columbia, MO	ESPN2	**W** 7–38	51,215	
September 7	Noon	Charleston Southern	**South Carolina**	Williams–Brice Stadium • Columbia, SC	SECN	**W** 10–72	70,698	
September 7	Noon	**Vanderbilt**	Purdue	Ross-Ade Stadium • West Lafayette, IN	BTN	**L** 24–42	50,506	
September 7	3:30 p.m.	Southern Miss	**Mississippi State**	Davis Wade Stadium • Starkville, MS	ESPNU	**W** 15–38	55,143	
September 7	3:30 p.m.	No. 12 **Texas A&M**	No. 1 Clemson	Memorial Stadium • Clemson, SC	ABC	**L** 10–24	81,500	
September 7	4:00 p.m.	Murray State	No. 3 **Georgia**	Sanford Stadium • Athens, GA	ESPN2	**W** 17–63	92,746	
September 7	4:00 p.m.	New Mexico State	No. 2 **Alabama**	Bryant–Denny Stadium • Tuscaloosa, AL	SECN	**W** 10–62	100,710	
September 7	7:00 p.m.	BYU	**Tennessee**	Neyland Stadium • Knoxville, TN	ESPN	**L** 29–26 ^{2OT}	92,475	
September 7	7:30 p.m.	No. 6 **LSU**	No. 9 Texas	Darrell K Royal–Texas Memorial Stadium • Austin, TX	ABC	**W** 45–38	98,763	
September 7	7:30 p.m.	Tulane	No. 10 **Auburn**	Jordan–Hare Stadium • Auburn, AL (rivalry)	ESPN2	**W** 6–24	85,317	
September 7	7:30 p.m.	Eastern Michigan	**Kentucky**	Kroger Field • Lexington, KY	SECN	**W** 17–38	55,240	
September 7	7:30 p.m.	**Arkansas**	**Ole Miss**	Vaught–Hemingway Stadium • Oxford, MS (rivalry)	SECN	**MISS** 17–31	47,915	
September 7	8:00 p.m.	UT Martin	No. 11 **Florida**	Ben Hill Griffin Stadium • Gainesville, FL	ESPNU	**W** 0–45	80,007	
^{#}Rankings from AP Poll released prior to game. All times are in Eastern Time.

==== Week Three ====
Date	Time	Visiting team	Home team	Site	TV	Result	Attendance	Ref.
September 14	Noon	Kansas State	**Mississippi State**	Davis Wade Stadium • Starkville, MS	ESPN	**L** 31–24	54,522	
September 14	Noon	Chattanooga	**Tennessee**	Neyland Stadium • Knoxville, TN	SECN	**W** 0–45	86,208	
September 14	Noon	Arkansas State	No. 3 **Georgia**	Sanford Stadium • Athens, GA	ESPN2	**W** 0–55	92,746	
September 14	3:30 p.m.	No. 2 **Alabama**	**South Carolina**	Williams–Brice Stadium • Columbia, SC	CBS	**ALA** 47–23	81,954	
September 14	4:00 p.m.	Southeastern Louisiana	**Ole Miss**	Vaught–Hemingway Stadium • Oxford, MS	SECN	**W** 29–40	45,238	
September 14	4:00 p.m.	Colorado State	**Arkansas**	Donald W. Reynolds Razorback Stadium • Fayetteville, AR	SECN	**W** 34–55	55,583	
September 14	7:00 p.m.	Kent State	No. 8 **Auburn**	Jordan–Hare Stadium • Auburn, AL	ESPN2	**W** 16–55	84,542	
September 14	7:00 p.m.	No. 9 **Florida**	**Kentucky**	Kroger Field • Lexington, KY	ESPN	**FLA** 29–21	63,076	
September 14	7:00 p.m.	Lamar	No. 16 **Texas A&M**	Kyle Field • College Station, TX	ESPNU	**W** 3–62	97,195	
September 14	7:30 p.m.	Northwestern State	No. 4 **LSU**	Tiger Stadium • Baton Rouge, LA	SECN	**W** 14–65	100,334	
September 14	7:30 p.m.	Southeast Missouri State	**Missouri**	Faurot Field • Columbia, MO	SECN	**W** 0–50	56,620	
^{#}Rankings from AP Poll released prior to game. All times are in Eastern Time.

==== Week Four ====
Date	Time	Visiting team	Home team	Site	TV	Result	Attendance	Ref.
September 21	Noon	No. 4 **LSU**	**Vanderbilt**	Vanderbilt Stadium • Nashville, TN	SECN	**LSU** 66–38	32,048	
September 21	Noon	**Tennessee**	No. 9 **Florida**	Ben Hill Griffin Stadium • Gainesville, FL (rivalry)	ESPN	**FLA** 3–34	82,276	
September 21	Noon	No. 23 California	**Ole Miss**	Vaught–Hemingway Stadium • Oxford, MS	ESPNU	**L** 28–20	46,850	
September 21	Noon	Southern Miss	No. 2 **Alabama**	Bryant–Denny Stadium • Tuscaloosa, AL	ESPN2	**W** 7–49	101,821	
September 21	3:30 p.m.	No. 8 **Auburn**	No. 17 **Texas A&M**	Kyle Field • College Station, TX	CBS	**AUB** 28–20	101,681	
September 21	4:00 p.m.	**Kentucky**	**Mississippi State**	Davis Wade Stadium • Starkville, MS	SECN	**MISS ST** 13–28	54,556	
September 21	4:00 p.m.	**South Carolina**	**Missouri**	Faurot Field • Columbia, MO	SECN	**MIZZOU** 14-34	52,012	
September 21	7:30 p.m.	San Jose State	**Arkansas**	Donald W. Reynolds Razorback Stadium • Fayetteville, AR	SECN	**L** 24–31	56,058	
September 21	8:00 p.m.	No. 7 Notre Dame	No. 3 **Georgia**	Sanford Stadium • Athens, GA	CBS	**W** 17–23	93,246	
^{#}Rankings from AP Poll released prior to game. All times are in Eastern Time.

==== Week Five ====
Date	Time	Visiting team	Home team	Site	TV	Result	Attendance	Ref.
September 28	Noon	Northern Illinois	**Vanderbilt**	Vanderbilt Stadium • Nashville, TN	SECN	**W** 18–24	24,519	
September 28	Noon	No. 23 **Texas A&M**	**Arkansas**	AT&T Stadium • Arlington, TX (Southwest Classic)	ESPN	**TAMU** 31–27	51,441	
September 28	3:30 p.m.	**Ole Miss**	No. 2 **Alabama**	Bryant–Denny Stadium • Tuscaloosa, AL (rivalry)	CBS	**ALA** 31–59	99,590	
September 28	4:00 p.m.	Towson	No. 9 **Florida**	Ben Hill Griffin Stadium • Gainesville, FL	SECN	**W** 0–38	79,126	
September 28	7:00 p.m.	**Mississippi State**	No. 7 **Auburn**	Jordan–Hare Stadium • Auburn, AL	ESPN	**AUB** 23–56	87,451	
September 28	7:30 p.m.	**Kentucky**	**South Carolina**	Williams–Brice Stadium • Columbia, SC	SECN	**SCAR** 7–24	80,828	
^{#}Rankings from AP Poll released prior to game. All times are in Eastern Time.

==== Week Six ====
Date	Time	Visiting team	Home team	Site	TV	Result	Attendance	Ref.
October 5	Noon	Utah State	No. 5 **LSU**	Tiger Stadium • Baton Rouge, LA	SECN	**W** 6–42	100,266	
October 5	3:30 p.m.	No. 7 **Auburn**	No. 10 **Florida**	Ben Hill Griffin Stadium • Gainesville, FL (rivalry)	CBS	**FLA** 13–24	90,584	
October 5	4:00 p.m.	Troy	**Missouri**	Farout Field • Columbia, MO	SECN	**W** 10–42	50,023	
October 5	7:00 p.m.	No. 3 **Georgia**	**Tennessee**	Neyland Stadium • Knoxville, TN (rivalry)	ESPN	**UGA** 43–14	92,709	
October 5	7:30 p.m.	**Vanderbilt**	**Ole Miss**	Vaught–Hemingway Stadium • Oxford, MS (rivalry)	SECN	**MISS** 6–31	47,601	
^{#}Rankings from AP Poll released prior to game. All times are in Eastern Time.

==== Week Seven ====
Date	Time	Visiting team	Home team	Site	TV	Result	Attendance	Ref.
October 12	Noon	**Mississippi State**	**Tennessee**	Neyland Stadium • Knoxville, TN	SECN	**TENN** 10–20	85,462	
October 12	Noon	**South Carolina**	No. 3 **Georgia**	Sanford Stadium • Athens, GA (rivalry)	ESPN	**SCAR** 20–17 ^{2OT}	92,746	
October 12	3:30 p.m.	No. 1 **Alabama**	No. 24 **Texas A&M**	Kyle Field • College Station, TX	CBS	**ALA** 47–28	106,749	
October 12	4:00 p.m.	UNLV	**Vanderbilt**	Vanderbilt Stadium • Nashville, TN	SECN	**L** 34–10	20,048	
October 12	7:00 p.m.	**Ole Miss**	**Missouri**	Farout Field • Columbia, MO	ESPN2	**W** **MIZZOU** 27–38	62,621	
October 12	7:30 p.m.	**Arkansas**	**Kentucky**	Kroger Field • Lexington, KY	SECN	**W** **UK** 20–24	57,060	
October 12	8:00 p.m.	No. 7 **Florida**	No. 5 **LSU**	Tiger Stadium • Baton Rouge, LA (rivalry)	ESPN	**W** **LSU** 28–42	102,321	
^{#}Rankings from AP Poll released prior to game. All times are in Eastern Time.

==== Week Eight ====
Date	Time	Visiting team	Home team	Site	TV	Result	Attendance	Ref.
October 19	Noon	No. 9 **Florida**	**South Carolina**	Williams–Brice Stadium • Columbia, SC	ESPN	**FLA** 38–27	78,883	
October 19	Noon	No. 11 **Auburn**	**Arkansas**	Donald W. Reynolds Razorbacks Stadium • Fayetteville, AR	SECN	**AUB** 51–10	54,619	
October 19	3:30 p.m.	No. 2 **LSU**	**Mississippi State**	Davis Wade Stadium • Starkville, MS (rivalry)	CBS	**LSU** 36–13	59,282	
October 19	4:00 p.m.	No. 22 **Missouri**	**Vanderbilt**	Vanderbilt Stadium • Nashville, TN	SECN	**VANDY** 21–14	23,900	
October 19	6:00 p.m.	**Kentucky**	No. 10 **Georgia**	Sanford Stadium • Athens, GA	ESPN	**UGA** 21–0	92,746	
October 19	7:30 p.m.	**Texas A&M**	**Ole Miss**	Vaught–Hemingway Stadium • Oxford, MS	SECN	**TAMU** 24–17	50,257	
October 19	9:00 p.m.	**Tennessee**	No. 1 **Alabama**	Bryant–Denny Stadium • Tuscaloosa, AL (Third Saturday in October)	ESPN	**ALA** 35–13	101,821	
^{#}Rankings from AP Poll released prior to game. All times are in Eastern Time.

==== Week Nine ====
Date	Time	Visiting team	Home team	Site	TV	Result	Attendance	Ref.
October 26	Noon	**Mississippi State**	**Texas A&M**	Kyle Field • College Station, TX	SECN	**TAMU** 49–30	102,025	
October 26	3:30 p.m.	No. 9 **Auburn**	No. 2 **LSU**	Tiger Stadium • Baton Rouge, LA (rivalry)	CBS	**LSU** 23–20	102,160	
October 26	4:00 p.m.	**South Carolina**	**Tennessee**	Neyland Stadium • Knoxville, TN	SECN	**TENN** 41–21	87,397	
October 26	7:00 p.m.	**Arkansas**	No. 1 **Alabama**	Bryant–Denny Stadium • Tuscaloosa, AL	ESPN	**ALA** 48–7	100,233	
October 26	7:30 p.m.	**Missouri**	**Kentucky**	Kroger Field • Lexington, KY	SECN	**UK** 29–7	48,446	
^{#}Rankings from AP Poll released prior to game. All times are in Eastern Time.

==== Week Ten ====
Date	Time	Visiting team	Home team	Site	TV	Result	Attendance	Ref.
November 2	Noon	UTSA	**Texas A&M**	Kyle Field • College Station, TX	SECN	**W** 45–14	100,635	
November 2	3:30 p.m.	No. 8 **Georgia**	No. 6 **Florida**	TIAA Bank Field • Jacksonville, FL (rivalry)	CBS	**UGA** 24–17	84,789	
November 2	4:00 p.m.	**Mississippi State**	**Arkansas**	Donald W. Reynolds Razorback Stadium • Fayetteville, AR	SECN	**MISS ST** 54–24	52,256	
November 2	7:00 p.m.	**Ole Miss**	No. 11 **Auburn**	Jordan–Hare Stadium • Auburn, AL (rivalry)	ESPN	**AUB** 20–14	87,457	
November 2	7:00 p.m.	UAB	**Tennessee**	Neyland Stadium • Knoxville, TN	ESPNU	**W** 30–7	85,791	
November 2	7:30 p.m.	**Vanderbilt**	**South Carolina**	Williams–Brice Stadium • Columbia, SC	SECN	**SCAR** 24–7	71,945	
^{#}Rankings from AP Poll released prior to game. All times are in Eastern Time.

==== Week Eleven ====
Date	Time	Visiting team	Home team	Site	TV	Result	Attendance	Ref.
November 9	Noon	**Vanderbilt**	No. 10 **Florida**	Ben Hill Griffin Stadium • Gainesville, FL	ESPN	**FLA** 56–0	86,201	
November 9	Noon	Western Kentucky	**Arkansas**	Donald W. Reynolds Razorback Stadium • Fayetteville, AR	SECN	**L** 19–45	42,985	
November 9	3:30 p.m.	No. 2 **LSU**	No. 3 **Alabama**	Bryant–Denny Stadium • Tuscaloosa, AL (rivalry)	CBS	**LSU** 46–41	101,821	
November 9	4:00 p.m.	New Mexico State	**Ole Miss**	Vaught–Hemingway Stadium • Oxford, MS	SECN	**W** 41–3	45,973	
November 9	7:00 p.m.	**Missouri**	No. 6 **Georgia**	Sanford Stadium • Athens, GA	ESPN	**UGA** 27–0	92,746	
November 9	7:00 p.m.	Appalachian State	**South Carolina**	Williams–Brice Stadium • Columbia, SC	ESPN2	**L** 15–20	80,849	
November 9	7:30 p.m.	**Tennessee**	**Kentucky**	Kroger Field • Lexington, KY (rivalry)	SECN	**TENN** 17–13	56,760	
^{#}Rankings from College Football Playoff. All times are in Eastern Time.

==== Week Twelve ====
Date	Time	Visiting team	Home team	Site	TV	Result	Attendance	Ref.
November 16	Noon	No. 5 **Alabama**	**Mississippi State**	Davis Wade Stadium • Starkville, MS (rivalry)	ESPN	**ALA** 38–7	57,607	
November 16	Noon	No. 11 **Florida**	**Missouri**	Faurot Field • Columbia, MO	CBS	**FLA** 23–6	57,280	
November 16	3:30 p.m.	**Kentucky**	**Vanderbilt**	Vanderbilt Stadium • Nashville, TN (rivalry)	SECN	**UK** 38–14	23,288	
November 16	3:30 p.m.	No. 4 **Georgia**	No. 12 **Auburn**	Jordan–Hare Stadium • Auburn, AL (Deep South's Oldest Rivalry)	CBS	**UGA** 21–14	87,451	
November 16	7:00 p.m.	No. 1 **LSU**	**Ole Miss**	Vaught–Hemingway Stadium • Oxford, MS (Magnolia Bowl)	ESPN	**LSU** 58–37	53,797	
November 16	7:30 p.m.	**South Carolina**	**Texas A&M**	Kyle Field • College Station, TX (rivalry)	SECN	**TAMU** 30–6	104,957	
^{#}Rankings from College Football Playoff. All times are in Eastern Time.

==== Week Thirteen ====
Date	Time	Visiting team	Home team	Site	TV	Result	Attendance	Ref.
November 23	Noon	Western Carolina	No. 5 **Alabama**	Bryant–Denny Stadium • Tuscaloosa, AL	ESPN	**W** 66–3	101,821	
November 23	Noon	Samford	No. 15 **Auburn**	Jordan–Hare Stadium • Auburn, AL	SECN	**W** 52–0	80,692	
November 23	3:30 p.m.	**Texas A&M**	No. 4 **Georgia**	Sanford Stadium • Athens, GA	CBS	**UGA** 19–13	92,746	
November 23	3:30 p.m.	UT Martin	**Kentucky**	Kroger Field • Lexington, KY	SECN	**W** 50–7	41,495	
November 23	3:30 p.m.	East Tennessee State	**Vanderbilt**	Vanderbilt Stadium • Nashville, TN	SECN	**W** 38–0	19,863	
November 23	7:00 p.m.	**Arkansas**	No. 1 **LSU**	Tiger Stadium • Baton Rouge, LA (Battle for the Golden Boot)	ESPN	**LSU** 56–20	101,173	
November 23	7:30 p.m.	**Tennessee**	**Missouri**	Faurot Field • Columbia, MO	SECN	**TENN** 24–20	49,348	
November 23	7:30 p.m.	Abilene Christian	**Mississippi State**	Davis Wade Stadium • Starkville, MS	SECN	**W** 45–7	54,683	
^{#}Rankings from College Football Playoff. All times are in Eastern Time.

==== Week Fourteen ====
Date	Time	Visiting team	Home team	Site	TV	Result	Attendance	Ref.
November 28	7:30 p.m.	**Ole Miss**	**Mississippi State**	Davis Wade Stadium • Starkville, MS (Egg Bowl)	ESPN	**MISS ST** 21–20	57,529	
November 29	2:30 p.m.	**Missouri**	**Arkansas**	War Memorial Stadium • Little Rock, AR (Battle Line Rivalry)	CBS	**MIZZOU** 24–14	33,961	
November 30	Noon	Louisville	**Kentucky**	Kroger Field • Lexington, KY (Governor's Cup)	SECN	**W** 45–13	48,336	
November 30	Noon	No. 3 Clemson	**South Carolina**	Williams–Brice Stadium • Columbia, SC (Palmetto Bowl)	ESPN	**L** 3–38	80,580	
November 30	Noon	No. 4 **Georgia**	Georgia Tech	Bobby Dodd Stadium • Atlanta, GA (Clean, Old-Fashioned Hate)	ABC	**W** 52–7	55,000	
November 30	3:30 p.m.	No. 5 **Alabama**	No. 15 **Auburn**	Jordan–Hare Stadium • Auburn, AL (Iron Bowl)	CBS	**AUB** 48–45	87,451	
November 30	4:00 p.m.	**Vanderbilt**	**Tennessee**	Neyland Stadium • Knoxville, TN (rivalry)	SECN	**TENN** 28–10	87,367	
November 30	7:00 p.m.	**Texas A&M**	No. 2 **LSU**	Tiger Stadium • Baton Rouge, LA (rivalry)	ESPN	**LSU** 50–7	102,218	
November 30	7:30 p.m.	Florida State	No. 11 **Florida**	Ben Hill Griffin Stadium • Gainesville, FL (Sunshine Showdown)	SECN	**W** 40–17	89,409	
^{#}Rankings from College Football Playoff. All times are in Eastern Time.

=== Championship game ===
Date	Time	Visiting team	Home team	Site	TV	Result	Attendance	Ref.
December 7	4:00 p.m.	No. 4 **Georgia**	No. 2 **LSU**	Mercedes-Benz Stadium • Atlanta, GA	CBS	**LSU** 37–10	74,150	
^{#}Rankings from College Football Playoff. All times are in Eastern Time.

== Head to head matchups ==
Head to head
Team	Alabama	Arkansas	Auburn	Florida	Georgia	LSU	Kentucky	Missouri	Mississippi State	Ole Miss	South Carolina	Tennessee	Texas A&M	Vanderbilt
Alabama	—	0-1	1-0			1-0			0-1	0-1	0-1	0-1	0-1	
Arkansas	1-0	—	1-0			1-0	1-0	1-0	1-0	1-0			1-0	
Auburn	0-1	0-1	—	1-0	1-0	1-0			0-1	0-1			0-1	
Florida			0-1	—	1-0	1-0	0-1	0-1			0-1	0-1		0-1
Georgia			0-1	0-1	—		0-1	0-1			1-0	0-1	0-1	0-1
Kentucky		0-1		1-0	1-0		—	0-1	1-0		1-0	1-0		0-1
LSU	0-1	0-1	0-1	0-1		—			0-1	0-1			0-1	0-1
Missouri		0-1		1-0	1-0		1-0	—		0-1	0-1	1-0		1-0
Mississippi State	1-0	0-1	1-0			1-0	0-1		—	0-1		1-0	1-0	
Ole Miss	1-0	0-1	1-0			1-0		1-0	1-0	—			1-0	0-1
South Carolina	1-0			1-0	0-1		0-1	1-0			—	1-0	1-0	0-1
Tennessee	1-0			1-0	1-0		0-1	0-1	0-1		0-1	—		0-1
Texas A&M	1-0	0-1	1-0		1-0	1-0			0-1	0-1	0-1		—	
Vanderbilt				1-0	1-0	1-0	1-0	0-1		1-0	1-0	1-0		—

Updated with the results of all games through December 4, 2020.

== SEC records vs other conferences ==
2019–2020 records against non-conference foes:

Regular Season

Power 5 Conferences	Record
ACC	5–3
Big Ten	0–1
Big 12	2–1
BYU/Notre Dame	1–1
Pac-12	1–1
Power 5 Total	9–7
Other FBS Conferences	Record
American	1–2
C-USA	4–0
Independents (Excluding BYU and Notre Dame)	2–0
MAC	4–0
Mountain West	2–3
Sun Belt	5–2
Other FBS Total	18–7
FCS Opponents	Record
Football Championship Subdivision	15–0
Total Non-Conference Record	42–14

Post Season

Power 5 Conferences	Record
ACC	3–1
Big Ten	2–1
Big 12	3–0
Power 5 Total	8–2
Total Bowl Record	8–2

=== SEC vs Power Five matchups ===
The following games include SEC teams competing against teams from the ACC, Big Ten, Big 12, or Pac-12. It also includes matchups against BYU or Notre Dame. Rankings from AP poll.

Date	Conference	Visitor	Home	Site	Score
August 24	ACC	Miami (FL)	No. 8 Florida	Camping World Stadium • Orlando, FL	W 24–20
August 31	ACC	South Carolina	North Carolina	Bank of America Stadium • Charlotte, NC	L 20–24
August 31	ACC	Duke	No. 2 Alabama	Mercedes-Benz Stadium • Atlanta, GA	W 42–3
August 31	Pac-12	No. 11 Oregon	No. 16 Auburn	AT&T Stadium • Arlington, TX	W 27–21
September 7	Independent	BYU	Tennessee	Neyland Stadium • Knoxville, TN	L 26–29 ^{2OT}
September 7	Big 12	West Virginia	Missouri	Faurot Field • Columbia, MO	W 38–7
September 7	Big Ten	Vanderbilt	Purdue	Ross-Ade Stadium • West Lafayette, IN	L 24–42
September 7	Big 12	No. 6 LSU	No. 9 Texas	Darrell K Royal–Texas Memorial Stadium • Austin, TX	W 45–38
September 7	ACC	No. 12 Texas A&M	No. 1 Clemson	Memorial Stadium • Clemson, SC	L 10–24
September 14	Big 12	Kansas State	Mississippi State	Davis Wade Stadium • Starkville, MS	L 24–31
September 21	Independent	No. 7 Notre Dame	No. 3 Georgia	Sanford Stadium • Athens, GA	W 23–17
September 21	Pac-12	No. 23 California	Ole Miss	Vaught–Hemingway Stadium • Oxford, MS	L 20–28
November 30	ACC	Florida State	No. 8 Florida	Ben Hill Griffin Stadium • Gainesville, FL	W 40–17
November 30	ACC	No. 4 Georgia	Georgia Tech	Bobby Dodd Stadium • Atlanta, GA	W 52–7
November 30	ACC	Louisville	Kentucky	Kroger Field • Lexington, KY	W 45–13
November 30	ACC	No. 3 Clemson	South Carolina	Williams–Brice Stadium • Columbia, SC	L 3–38

=== SEC vs Group of Five matchups ===
The following games include SEC teams competing against teams from the American, C-USA, MAC, Mountain West or Sun Belt. Rankings from AP poll.

Date	Conference	Visitor	Home	Site	Score
August 29	Sun Belt	Texas State	No. 12 Texas A&M	Kyle Field • College Station, TX	W 41–7
August 31	American	Ole Miss	Memphis	Liberty Bowl Memorial Stadium • Memphis, TN	L 10–15
August 31	MAC	Toledo	Kentucky	Kroger Field • Lexington, KY	W 38–24
August 31	Sun Belt	Mississippi State	Louisiana	Mercedes-Benz Superdome • New Orleans, LA	W 38–28
August 31	Sun Belt	Georgia State	Tennessee	Neyland Stadium • Knoxville, TN	L 30–38
August 31	Sun Belt	Georgia Southern	No. 6 LSU	Tiger Stadium • Baton Rouge, LA	W 55–3
August 31	Mountain West	Missouri	Wyoming	War Memorial Stadium • Laramie, WY	L 31–37
September 7	C-USA	Southern Miss	Mississippi State	Davis Wade Stadium • Starkville, MS	W 38–15
September 7	American	Tulane	No. 10 Auburn	Jordan–Hare Stadium • Auburn, AL	W 24–6
September 7	MAC	Eastern Michigan	Kentucky	Kroger Field • Lexington, KY	W 38–17
September 14	Sun Belt	Arkansas State	No. 3 Georgia	Sanford Stadium • Athens, GA	W 55–0
September 14	Mountain West	Colorado State	Arkansas	Donald W. Reynolds Razorbacks Stadium • Fayetteville, AR	W 55–34
September 14	MAC	Kent State	No. 8 Auburn	Jordan–Hare Stadium • Auburn, AL	W 55–16
September 21	C-USA	Southern Miss	No. 2 Alabama	Bryant–Denny Stadium • Tuscaloosa, AL	W 49–7
September 21	Mountain West	San Jose State	Arkansas	Donald W. Reynolds Razorbacks Stadium • Fayetteville, AR	L 24–31
September 28	MAC	Northern Illinois	Vanderbilt	Vanderbilt Stadium • Nashville, TN	W 24–18
October 5	Mountain West	Utah State	No. 5 LSU	Tiger Stadium • Baton Rouge, LA	W 42–6
October 5	Sun Belt	Troy	Missouri	Faurot Field • Columbia, MO	W 42–10
October 12	Mountain West	UNLV	Vanderbilt	Vanderbilt Stadium • Nashville, TN	L 10–34
November 2	C-USA	UAB	Tennessee	Neyland Stadium • Knoxville, TN	W 30–7
November 2	C-USA	UTSA	Texas A&M	Kyle Field • College Station, TX	W 45–14
November 9	C-USA	Western Kentucky	Arkansas	Donald W. Reynolds Razorback Stadium • Fayetteville, AR	L 19–45
November 9	Sun Belt	Appalachian State	South Carolina	Williams–Brice Stadium • Columbia, SC	L 15–20

=== SEC vs FBS independents matchups ===
The following games include SEC teams competing against FBS Independents, which includes Army, Liberty, New Mexico State, or UMass. Rankings from AP poll.

Date	Visitor	Home	Site	Score
September 7	New Mexico State	No. 2 Alabama	Bryant–Denny Stadium • Tuscaloosa, AL	W 62–10
November 9	New Mexico State	Ole Miss	Vaught–Hemingway Stadium • Oxford, MS	W 41–3

=== SEC vs FCS matchups ===
The following is a list of matchups with teams competing in Football Championship Subdivision (FCS). Rankings from AP poll.

Date	Visitor	Home	Site	Score
August 31	Portland State	Arkansas	Donald W. Reynolds Razorbacks Stadium • Fayetteville, AR	W 20–13
September 7	Charleston Southern	South Carolina	Williams–Brice Stadium • Columbia, SC	W 72–10
September 7	Murray State	No. 3 Georgia	Sanford Stadium • Athens, GA	W 63–17
September 7	UT Martin	No. 11 Florida	Ben Hill Griffin Stadium • Gainesville, FL	W 45–0
September 14	Southeastern Louisiana	Ole Miss	Vaught–Hemingway Stadium • Oxford, MS	W 40–29
September 14	Chattanooga	Tennessee	Neyland Stadium • Knoxville, TN	W 45–0
September 14	Lamar	No. 16 Texas A&M	Kyle Field • College Station, TX	W 62–3
September 14	Northwestern State	No. 4 LSU	Tiger Stadium • Baton Rouge, LA	W 65–14
September 14	Southeast Missouri State	Missouri	Faurot Field • Columbia, MO	W 50–0
September 28	Towson	No. 9 Florida	Ben Hill Griffin Stadium • Gainesville, FL	W 38–0
November 23	Western Carolina	No. 5 Alabama	Bryant–Denny Stadium • Tuscaloosa, AL	W 66–3
November 23	Samford	No. 16 Auburn	Jordan–Hare Stadium • Auburn, AL	W 52–0
November 23	UT Martin	Kentucky	Kroger Field • Lexington, KY	W 50–7
November 23	Abilene Christian	Mississippi State	Davis Wade Stadium • Starkville, MS	W 38–0
November 23	East Tennessee State	Vanderbilt	Vanderbilt Stadium • Nashville, TN	W 45–7

== Postseason ==
=== Bowl games ===
Rankings are from final CFP rankings. All times Eastern.

Date	Time	Bowl Game	Site	TV	SEC team	Opponent	Result
January 13, 2020	8:00 p.m.	CFP National Championship	Mercedes-Benz Superdome • New Orleans, LA	ESPN	No. 1 LSU (14–0)	No. 3 Clemson (14–0)	W 42–25
January 2, 2020	7:00 p.m.	Gator Bowl	TIAA Bank Field • Jacksonville, FL	ESPN	Tennessee (7–5)	Indiana (8–4)	W 23–22
January 1, 2020	8:45 p.m.	Sugar Bowl (New Year's Six)	Mercedes-Benz Superdome • New Orleans, LA	ESPN	No. 5 Georgia (11–2)	No. 7 Baylor (11–2)	W 26–14
January 1, 2020	1:00 p.m.	Outback Bowl	Raymond James Stadium • Tampa, FL	ESPN	No. 12 Auburn (9–3)	No. 18 Minnesota (10–2)	L 24–31
January 1, 2020	1:00 p.m.	Citrus Bowl	Camping World Stadium • Orlando, FL	ABC	No. 13 Alabama (10–2)	No. 14 Michigan (9–3)	W 35–16
December 31, 2019	12:00 p.m.	Belk Bowl	Bank of America Stadium • Charlotte, NC	ESPN	Kentucky (7–5)	Virginia Tech (8–4)	W 37–30
December 30, 2019	8:00 p.m.	Orange Bowl (New Year's Six)	Hard Rock Stadium • Miami Gardens, FL	ESPN	No. 9 Florida (10–2)	No. 24 Virginia (9–4)	W 36–28
December 30, 2019	4:00 p.m.	Music City Bowl	Nissan Stadium • Nashville, TN	ESPN	Mississippi State (6–6)	Louisville (7–5)	L 28–38
December 28, 2019	4:00 p.m.	Peach Bowl (CFP Seminfinal)	Mercedes-Benz Stadium • Atlanta, GA	ESPN	No. 1 LSU (13–0)	No. 4 Oklahoma (12–1)	W 63–28
December 27, 2019	6:45 p.m.	Texas Bowl	NRG Stadium • Houston, TX	ESPN	Texas A&M (7–5)	No. 25 Oklahoma State (8–4)	W 24–21

== Awards and honors ==
=== Player of the week honors ===
Week	Offensive			Defensive			Offensive Line			Defensive Line			Specialist			Freshman		
Week	Player	Team	Position	Player	Team	Position	Player	Team	Position	Player	Team	Position	Player	Team	Position	Player	Team	Position
Week 1 (Sept. 2)	Tua Tagovailoa; Joe Burrow	Alabama; LSU	QB	Jeremiah Dinson	Auburn	DB	Andrew Thomas	Georgia	OT	D. J. Dale; Jonathan Greenard	Alabama; Florida	DL	Rodrigo Blankenship	Georgia	PK	Bo Nix	Auburn	QB
Week 2 (Sept. 9)	Joe Burrow (2)	LSU	QB	Nick Bolton	Missouri	LB	Landon Young; Darryl Williams	Kentucky; Mississippi State	OT; C	Marlon Davidson	Auburn	DL	Cade York	LSU	PK	Matt Corral	Ole Miss	QB
Week 3 (Sept. 16)	Tua Tagovailoa (2)	Alabama	QB	David Reese II	Florida	LB	Landon Dickerson	Alabama	OL	Marlon Davidson (2)	Auburn	DL	Connor Limpert	Arkansas	PK	Ryan Hilinski	South Carolina	QB
Week 4 (Sept. 23)	Joe Burrow (3)	LSU	QB	Cale Garrett	Missouri	DB	Brett Heggie	Florida	OL	Derrick Brown	Auburn	DL	Rodrigo Blankenship (2)	Georgia	PK	Garrett Shrader	Mississippi State	QB
Week 5 (Sept. 30)	DeVonta Smith	Alabama	WR	D. J. Wonnum	South Carolina	DE	Mike Horton	Auburn	OL	Jeremiah Moon	Florida	DL	Joseph Charlton	South Carolina	PK	Bo Nix (2)	Auburn	QB
Week 6 (Oct. 7)	Freddie Swain	Florida	WR	Cale Garrett (2); Shawn Davis	Missouri; Florida	LB; DB	Ben Brown	Ole Miss	OL	Derrick Brown (2)	Auburn	DL	Rodrigo Blankenship (3)	Georgia	PK	John Rhys Plumlee	Ole Miss	QB
Week 7 (Oct. 14)	Joe Burrow (4); Lynn Bowden	LSU; Kentucky	QB; AP	Israel Mukuamu	South Carolina	DB	Yasir Durant; Trey Smith	Missouri; Tennessee	LT; LG	Javon Kinlaw	South Carolina	DL	Jaylen Waddle	Alabama	WR/PR	Derek Stingley Jr.	LSU	DB
Week 8 (Oct. 21)	D'Andre Swift	Georgia	RB	Buddy Johnson; JaCoby Stevens	Texas A&M; LSU	LB; S	Alex Leatherwood	Alabama	OL	Marlon Davidson (3)	Auburn	DL	Harrison Smith	Vanderbilt	P	Jacob Copeland	Florida	WR
Week 9 (Oct. 28)	Jauan Jennings; Lynn Bowden (2)	Tennessee; Kentucky	WR; AP	Jacoby Stevens (2); Daniel Bituli	LSU; Tennessee	S; LB	Brandon Kennedy	Tennessee	OL	Calvin Taylor	Kentucky	DT	Max Duffy	Kentucky	P	D.J. Williams	Auburn	RB
Week 10 (Nov. 4)	Kylin Hill	Mississippi State	RB	Bryce Thompson	Tennessee	DB	Andrew Thomas (2)	Georgia	OL	Derrick Brown (3)	Auburn	DL	Rodrigo Blankenship (4)	Georgia	PK	Isaiah Spiller	Texas A&M	RB
Week 11 (Nov. 11)	Joe Burrow (5); Clyde Edwards-Helaire	LSU	QB; RB	Daniel Bituli (2)	Tennessee	LB	Ben Cleveland	Georgia	OL	Jonathan Greenard (2)	Florida	DL	Rodrigo Blankenship (5)	Georgia	PK	John Rhys Plumlee (2); Mohamoud Diabate	Ole Miss; Florida	QB; LB
Week 12 (Nov. 18)	Ja'Marr Chase	LSU	WR	Monty Rice	Georgia	LB	Colton Prater; Drake Jackson	Texas A&M; Kentucky	C	Jonathan Greenard (3)	Florida	DL	Jake Camarda	Georgia	P	John Rhys Plumlee (3)	Ole Miss	QB
Week 13 (Nov. 25)	Jarrett Guarantano	Tennessee	QB	JaCoby Stevens (3)	LSU	S	Trey Smith (2)	Tennessee	OL	Marlon Davidson (4)	Auburn	DE	Rodrigo Blankenship (6)	Georgia	PK	Maurice Hampton	LSU	S
Week 14 (Dec. 1)	Lynn Bowden (3)	Kentucky	AP	Zakoby McClain	Auburn	LB	Darryl Williams	Mississippi State	C	Jonathan Greenard (4)	Florida	DL	Anders Carlson	Auburn	PK	Eric Gray	Tennessee	RB

=== SEC Individual Awards ===
The following individuals received postseason honors as voted by the Southeastern Conference football coaches at the end of the season

Award	Player	School
Offensive Player of the Year	Joe Burrow, QB, Sr.	LSU
Defensive Player of the Year	Derrick Brown, DT, Sr.	Auburn
Special Teams Player of the Year	Jaylen Waddle, WR/KR, So.	Alabama
Freshman of the Year	Bo Nix, QB	Auburn
Newcomer of the Year	Derek Stingley Jr., CB	LSU
Jacobs Blocking Trophy	Andrew Thomas, OL, Jr.	Georgia
Scholar Athlete of the Year	Rodrigo Blankenship, PK, Sr.	Georgia
Coach of the Year	Ed Orgeron	LSU

=== All-conference teams ===
Position	Player	Team
First Team Offense
WR	Ja'Marr Chase	LSU
WR	Jerry Jeudy	Alabama
OL	Andrew Thomas	Georgia
OL	Jedrick Wills	Alabama
OL	Alex Leatherwood	Alabama
OL	Trey Smith	Tennessee
C	Lloyd Cushenberry	LSU
TE	Kyle Pitts	Florida
QB	Joe Burrow	LSU
RB	Clyde Edwards-Helaire	LSU
RB	D'Andre Swift	Georgia
AP	Lynn Bowden	Kentucky
First Team Defense
DL	Derrick Brown	Auburn
DL	Marlon Davidson	Auburn
DL	Jonathan Greenard	Florida
DL	Javon Kinlaw	South Carolina
LB	Anfernee Jennings	Alabama
LB	K'Lavon Chaisson	LSU
LB	Nick Bolton	Missouri
CB	C. J. Henderson	Florida
S	J.R. Reed	Georgia
S	Grant Delpit	LSU
S	Xavier McKinney	Alabama
First Team Special Teams
K	Rodrigo Blankenship	Georgia
P	Braden Mann	Texas A&M
RS	Jaylen Waddle	Alabama

Position	Player	Team
Second Team Offense
WR	DeVonta Smith	Alabama
WR	Bryan Edwards	South Carolina
OL	Logan Stenberg	Kentucky
OL	Adrian Magee	LSU
OL	Prince Tega Wanogho	Auburn
OL	Damien Lewis	LSU
C	Landon Dickerson	Alabama
TE	Albert Okwuegbunam	Missouri
QB	Tua Tagovailoa	Alabama
RB	Kylin Hill	Mississippi State
RB	Najee Harris	Alabama
AP	Jaylen Waddle	Alabama
Second Team Defense
DL	Raekwon Davis	Alabama
DL	Benito Jones	Ole Miss
DL	Rashard Lawrence	LSU
DL	Tyler Clark	Georgia
LB	Daniel Bituli	Tennessee
LB	K. J. Britt	Auburn
LB	Terrell Lewis	Alabama
CB	Trevon Diggs	Alabama
CB	Derek Stingley Jr.	LSU
S	Nigel Warrior	Tennessee
S	JaCoby Stevens	LSU
Second Team Special Teams
K	Brent Cimaglia	Tennessee
P	Max Duffy	Kentucky
RS	Jerrion Ealy	Ole Miss
RS	Treylon Burks	Arkansas
RS	Clyde Edwards-Helaire	LSU
RS	Christian Tutt	Auburn
RS	Marquez Callaway	Tennessee

*Denotes Unanimous Selection

=== All-Americans ===
The 2019 College Football All-America Teams are composed of the following College Football All-American first teams chosen by the following selector organizations: Associated Press (AP), Football Writers Association of America (FWAA), American Football Coaches Association (AFCA), Walter Camp Foundation (WCFF), The Sporting News (TSN), Sports Illustrated (SI), USA Today (USAT) ESPN, CBS Sports (CBS), FOX Sports (FOX) College Football News (CFN), Bleacher Report (BR), Scout.com, Phil Steele (PS), SB Nation (SB), Athlon Sports, Pro Football Focus (PFF) and Yahoo! Sports (Yahoo!).

Currently, the NCAA compiles consensus all-America teams in the sports of Division I-FBS football and Division I men's basketball using a point system computed from All-America teams named by coaches associations or media sources. The system consists of three points for a first-team honor, two points for second-team honor, and one point for third-team honor. Honorable mention and fourth team or lower recognitions are not accorded any points. Football consensus teams are compiled by position and the player accumulating the most points at each position is named first team consensus all-American. Currently, the NCAA recognizes All-Americans selected by the AP, AFCA, FWAA, TSN, and the WCFF to determine Consensus and Unanimous All-Americans. Any player named to the First Team by all five of the NCAA-recognized selectors is deemed a Unanimous All-American.

Position	Player	School	Selector	Unanimous	Consensus
First Team All-Americans
QB	Joe Burrow	LSU	AFCA, AP, CBS, ESPN, FWAA, SI, Athletic, USAT, WCFF, TSN	*	*
WR	Jerry Jeudy	Alabama	AFCA		
WR	Ja'Marr Chase	LSU	AFCA, AP, CBS, ESPN, FWAA, SI, USAT, WCFF, TSN	*	*
OL	Alex Leatherwood	Alabama	AFCA		
OL	Andrew Thomas	Georgia	AFCA, AP, CBS, ESPN, FWAA, SI, WCFF, TSN	*	*
OL	Jedrick Wills	Alabama	CBS, USAT		
AP	Lynn Bowden	Kentucky	AFCA, AP, CBS, ESPN, SI, USAT, TSN		*
DL	Derrick Brown	Auburn	AFCA, AP, CBS, ESPN, FWAA, SI, USAT, WCFF, TSN	*	*
DL	Javon Kinlaw	South Carolina	AP		
LB	Jonathan Greenard	Florida	CBS		
CB	Derek Stingley Jr.	LSU	AFCA, AP, CBS, ESPN, SI, USAT, TSN		*
S	Grant Delpit	LSU	AFCA, CBS, WCFF, TSN		*
S	J.R. Reed	Georgia	AP, FWAA, WCFF		*
S	Xavier McKinney	Alabama	ESPN, USAT		
P	Max Duffy	Kentucky	AFCA, AP, ESPN, FWAA, USAT, WCFF, TSN	*	*
P	Braden Mann	Texas A&M	CBS, SI		
K	Rodrigo Blankenship	Georgia	AFCA, SI, USAT, WCFF		
PR/KR	Jaylen Waddle	Alabama	CBS, FWAA, SI, USAT, TSN		

Position	Player	School	Selector	Unanimous	Consensus
Second Team All-Americans
WR	DeVonta Smith	Alabama	AP, CBS, SI, TSN		
OL	Alex Leatherwood	Alabama	CBS		
OL	Andrew Thomas	Georgia	USAT		
OL	Jedrick Wills	Alabama	WCFF, TSN		
OL	Logan Stenberg	Kentucky	FWAA		
OL	Solomon Kindley	Georgia	SI		
C	Lloyd Cushenberry	LSU	AFCA, FWAA		
AP	Jaylen Waddle	Alabama	AP		
AP	Clyde Edwards-Helaire	LSU	USAT		
DL	Javon Kinlaw	South Carolina	USAT		
DL	Raekwon Davis	Alabama	AFCA		
DL	Marlon Davidson	Auburn	AFCA, CBS, TSN		
DL	Jordan Elliott	Missouri	AP		
LB	Anfernee Jennings	Alabama	SI		
CB	Derek Stingley Jr.	LSU	FWAA, WCFF		
CB	Trevon Diggs	Alabama	AFCA, TSN		
CB	C. J. Henderson	Florida	CBS, FWAA		
S	Grant Delpit	LSU	AP		
S	J. R. Reed	Georgia	AFCA, SI, USAT, TSN		
S	Xavier McKinney	Alabama	AFCA, CBS, WCFF, TSN		
P	Max Duffy	Kentucky	CBS, SI		
K	Rodrigo Blankenship	Georgia	AP, TSN		
P	Braden Mann	Texas A&M	AFCA, AP, WCFF, TSN		
PR/KR	Jaylen Waddle	Alabama	WCFF		

Position	Player	School	Selector	Unanimous	Consensus
Third Team All-Americans
S	Xavier McKinney	Alabama	AP		
CB	Trevon Diggs	Alabama	AP		

Position	Player	School	Selector	Unanimous	Consensus
Fourth Team All-Americans

*AFCA All-America Team
*AP All-America teams
*CBS Sports All-America Team
*ESPN All-America Team
*FWAA All-America Team
*Sports Illustrated All-America Team
*The Athletic All-America Team
*USA Today All-America Team
*Walter Camp All-America Team
*Sporting News All-America Team

=== National award winners ===
Lynn Bowden

- Paul Hornung Award

Derrick Brown

- Lott Trophy

Joe Burrow

- Heisman Trophy
- Maxwell Award
- Johnny Unitas Golden Arm Award
- Walter Camp Award
- Davey O'Brien Award

Ja'Marr Chase

- Fred Biletnikoff Award

Grant Delpit

- Jim Thorpe Award

Max Duffy

- Ray Guy Award

2019 College Football Award Winners

== Home game attendance ==
Team	Stadium	Capacity	Game 1	Game 2	Game 3	Game 4	Game 5	Game 6	Game 7	Game 8	Total	Average	% of Capacity
Alabama	Bryant–Denny Stadium	101,821	100,710	101,821	99,590	101,821	100,233	101,821	101,821	–	707,817	101,117	99.31%
Arkansas	Razorback Stadium	76,212	61,055	55,583	56,058	54,619	52,256	42,985	33,961^{A}	–	356,517	53,761	70.72%
Auburn	Jordan–Hare Stadium	87,451	85,317	84,542	87,451	87,457	87,451	80,692	87,451	–	570,361	81,480	93.17%
Florida	Ben Hill Griffin Stadium	88,548	80,007	82,776	79,126	90,584	86,201	89,409	–	–	508,103	84,684	95.64%
Georgia	Sanford Stadium	92,746	92,746	92,746	93,246	92,746	92,746	92,746	92,746	–	649,722	92,817	100.08%
Kentucky	Kroger Field	61,000	54,610	55,240	63,076	57,060	48,446	56,760	41,495	48,336	425,023	53,128	87.09%
LSU	Tiger Stadium	102,321	97,420	100,334	100,266	102,321	102,160	101,173	102,218	–	705,892	100,842	98.56%
Mississippi State	Davis Wade Stadium	61,337	55,143	54,522	54,556	59,282	57,607	54,683	57,529	–	393,322	56,189	91.61%
Missouri	Faurot Field	62,621	51,215	56,620	52,012	50,023	62,621	57,280	49,348	–	379,119	54,160	86.49%
Ole Miss	Vaught–Hemingway Stadium	64,038	47,915	45,238	46,850	47,601	50,257	45,973	53,797	–	337,631	48,233	75.32%
South Carolina	Williams–Brice Stadium	80,250	70,698	81,954	80,828	78,883	71,945	80,849	80,580	–	545,737	77,962	97.15%
Tennessee	Neyland Stadium	102,455	85,503	92,745	86,208	92,709	85,462	87,397	85,791	87,367	703,182	87,898	85.79%
Texas A&M	Kyle Field	102,733	98,016	97,195	101,681	106,749	102,025	100,635	104,957	–	711,258	101,608	98.91%
Vanderbilt	Vanderbilt Stadium	40,550	40,351	32,048	24,519	20,048	23,900	23,288	19,863	–	184,017	26,288	64.83%

^AGame played at Arkansas' secondary home stadium War Memorial Stadium, capacity: 54,120.

== NFL draft ==
The following list includes all SEC players drafted in the 2020 NFL draft.

Round #	Pick #	NFL team	Player	Position	College
1	1	Cincinnati Bengals	Joe Burrow	QB	LSU
1	4	New York Giants	Andrew Thomas	OT	Georgia
1	5	Miami Dolphins	Tua Tagovailoa	QB	Alabama
1	7	Carolina Panthers	Derrick Brown	DT	Auburn
1	9	Jacksonville Jaguars	C. J. Henderson	CB	Florida
1	10	Cleveland Browns	Jedrick Wills	OT	Alabama
1	12	Las Vegas Raiders	Henry Ruggs	WR	Alabama
1	14	San Francisco 49ers	Javon Kinlaw	DT	South Carolina
1	15	Denver Broncos	Jerry Jeudy	WR	Alabama
1	20	Jacksonville Jaguars	K'Lavon Chaisson	LB	LSU
1	22	Minnesota Vikings	Justin Jefferson	WR	LSU
1	28	Baltimore Ravens	Patrick Queen	LB	LSU
1	29	Tennessee Titans	Isaiah Wilson	OT	Georgia
1	30	Miami Dolphins	Noah Igbinoghene	CB	Auburn
1	32	Kansas City Chiefs	Clyde Edwards-Helaire	RB	LSU
2	35	Detroit Lions	D'Andre Swift	RB	Georgia
2	36	New York Giants	Xavier McKinney	S	Alabama
2	44	Cleveland Browns	Grant Delpit	S	LSU
2	47	Atlanta Falcons	Marlon Davidson	DE	Auburn
2	48	Seattle Seahawks	Darrell Taylor	DE	Tennessee
2	51	Dallas Cowboys	Trevon Diggs	CB	Alabama
2	56	Miami Dolphins	Raekwon Davis	DT	Alabama
2	57	Los Angeles Rams	Van Jefferson	WR	Florida
2	61	Tennessee Titans	Kristian Fulton	CB	LSU
2	63	Kansas City Chiefs	Willie Gay	ILB	Mississippi State
3	69	Seattle Seahawks	Damien Lewis	G	LSU
3	71	Baltimore Ravens	Justin Madubuike	DT	Texas A&M
3	76	Tampa Bay Buccaneers	Ke'Shawn Vaughn	RB	Vanderbilt
3	79	New York Jets	Jabari Zuniga	DE	Florida
3	80	Las Vegas Raiders	Lynn Bowden	WR	Kentucky
3	81	Las Vegas Raiders	Bryan Edwards	WR	South Carolina
3	83	Denver Broncos	Lloyd Cushenberry	C	LSU
3	84	Los Angeles Rams	Terrell Lewis	OLB	Alabama
3	87	New England Patriots	Anfernee Jennings	OLB	Alabama
3	88	Cleveland Browns	Jordan Elliott	DT	Missouri
3	89	Minnesota Vikings	Cameron Dantzler	CB	Mississippi State
3	90	Houston Texans	Jonathan Greenard	OLB	Florida
3	95	Denver Broncos	McTelvin Agim	DT	Arkansas
3	97	Cleveland Browns	Jacob Phillips	ILB	LSU
3	106	Baltimore Ravens	Tyre Phillips	G	Mississippi State
4	108	Washington Redskins	Saahdiq Charles	OT	LSU
4	111	Miami Dolphins	Solomon Kindley	G	Georgia
4	117	Minnesota Vikings	D. J. Wonnum	DE	South Carolina
4	118	Denver Broncos	Albert Okwuegbunam	TE	Missouri
4	120	New York Jets	La'Mical Perine	RB	Florida
4	121	Detroit Lions	Logan Stenberg	G	Kentucky
4	131	Arizona Cardinals	Rashard Lawrence	DT	LSU
4	145	Philadelphia Eagles	Jack Driscoll	G	Auburn
5	157	Jacksonville Jaguars	Daniel Thomas	S	Auburn
5	167	Buffalo Bills	Jake Fromm	QB	Georgia
6	185	Miami Dolphins	Blake Ferguson	LS	LSU
6	190	San Francisco 49ers	Charlie Woerner	TE	Georgia
6	191	New York Jets	Braden Mann	P	Texas A&M
6	210	Philadelphia Eagles	Prince Tega Wanogho	OT	Auburn
6	214	Seattle Seahawks	Freddie Swain	WR	Florida
7	216	Washington Redskins	Kamren Curl	SS	Arkansas
7	217	San Francisco 49ers	Jauan Jennings	WR	Tennessee
7	238	New York Giants	T. J. Brunson	OLB	South Carolina
7	240	New Orleans Saints	Tommy Stevens	QB	Mississippi State
7	249	Minnesota Vikings	Brian Cole	OLB	Mississippi State
7	251	Seattle Seahawks	Stephen Sullivan	TE	LSU
7	252	Denver Broncos	Tyrie Cleveland	WR	Florida
7	255	New York Giants	Tae Crowder	LB	Georgia
