= 2019 All-America college football team =

Official list of the best college football players of 2019

The 2019 All-America college football team includes those players of American college football who have been honored by various selector organizations as the best players at their respective positions. The selector organizations award the "All-America" honor annually following the conclusion of the fall college football season. The original All-America team was the 1889 All-America college football team selected by Caspar Whitney. The National Collegiate Athletic Bureau, which is the National Collegiate Athletic Association's (NCAA) service bureau, compiled, in the 1950, the first list of All-Americans including first-team selections on teams created for a national audience that received national circulation with the intent of recognizing selections made from viewpoints that were nationwide. Since 1957, College Sports Information Directors of America (CoSIDA) has bestowed Academic All-American recognition on male and female athletes in Divisions I, II, and III of the NCAA as well as National Association of Intercollegiate Athletics athletes, including all NCAA championship sports.

The 2019 All-America college football team is composed of the following All-America first teams chosen by the following selector organizations: Associated Press (AP), Football Writers Association of America (FWAA), American Football Coaches Association (AFCA), Walter Camp Foundation (WCFF), Sporting News (TSN, from its historic name of The Sporting News), Sports Illustrated (SI), The Athletic (Athletic), USA Today (USAT) ESPN, CBS Sports (CBS), College Football News (CFN), Scout.com, Athlon Sports, and Fox Sports (FOX).

Currently, the NCAA compiles consensus all-America teams in the sports of Division I FBS football and Division I men's basketball using a point system computed from All-America teams named by coaches associations or media sources. Players are chosen against other players playing at their position only. To be selected a consensus All-American, players must be chosen to the first team on at least two of the five official selectors as recognized by the NCAA. Second- and third-team honors are used to break ties. Players named first-team by all five selectors are deemed unanimous All-Americans. Currently, the NCAA recognizes All-Americans selected by the AP, AFCA, FWAA, TSN, and the WCFF to determine consensus and unanimous All-Americans.

Twenty-five players were recognized as consensus All-Americans for 2019, 16 of them unanimously. Unanimous selections are followed by an asterisk (*)

2019 Consensus All-Americans
Name	Position	Year	University
Joe Burrow*	Quarterback	Senior	LSU
Chuba Hubbard*	Running back	Sophomore	Oklahoma State
Jonathan Taylor*	Running back	Junior	Wisconsin
Ja'Marr Chase*	Wide receiver	Sophomore	LSU
CeeDee Lamb	Wide receiver	Junior	Oklahoma
Harrison Bryant*	Tight end	Senior	FAU
Tyler Biadasz*	Center	Junior	Wisconsin
Wyatt Davis	Offensive line	Sophomore	Ohio State
John Simpson	Offensive line	Senior	Clemson
Penei Sewell*	Offensive line	Sophomore	Oregon
Andrew Thomas*	Offensive line	Junior	Georgia
Bradlee Anae	Defensive line	Senior	Utah
Derrick Brown*	Defensive line	Senior	Auburn
James Lynch*	Defensive line	Junior	Baylor
Chase Young*	Defensive line	Junior	Ohio State
Zack Baun	Linebacker	Senior	Wisconsin
Micah Parsons	Linebacker	Sophomore	Penn State
Isaiah Simmons*	Linebacker	Junior	Clemson
Evan Weaver*	Linebacker	Senior	California
Grant Delpit	Defensive back	Junior	LSU
Jeff Okudah*	Defensive back	Junior	Ohio State
J. R. Reed	Defensive back	Senior	Georgia
Derek Stingley Jr.	Defensive back	Freshman	LSU
Antoine Winfield Jr.*	Defensive back	Sophomore	Minnesota
Max Duffy*	Punter	Junior	Kentucky
Lynn Bowden	All-purpose	Junior	Kentucky
Keith Duncan	Placekicker	Junior	Iowa

== Offense ==
=== Quarterback ===
- Joe Burrow, LSU (AFCA, AP, Athletic, Athlon, CBS, ESPN, FWAA, Phil Steele, SI, TSN, USAT, WCFF)

=== Running back ===
- J. K. Dobbins, Ohio State (Athletic, Athlon, CBS, Phil Steele, SI, USAT)
- Travis Etienne, Clemson (USAT)
- Chuba Hubbard, Oklahoma State (AFCA, AP, CBS, ESPN, FWAA, Phil Steele, SI, TSN, WCFF)
- Jonathan Taylor, Wisconsin (AFCA, AP, Athletic, Athlon, ESPN, FWAA, Phil Steele, SI, TSN, WCFF)

=== Wide receiver ===
- Ja'Marr Chase, LSU (AFCA, AP, Athletic, Athlon, CBS, ESPN, FWAA, Phil Steele, SI, TSN, USAT, WCFF)
- Jerry Jeudy, Alabama (AFCA)
- CeeDee Lamb, Oklahoma (AP, Athletic, Athlon, CBS, ESPN, FWAA, Phil Steele, SI, TSN, USAT, WCFF)
- DeVonta Smith, Alabama (Athlon)

=== Tight end ===
- Harrison Bryant, FAU (AFCA, AP, Athlon, CBS, ESPN, FWAA, Phil Steele, SI, TSN, USAT, WCFF)
- Hunter Bryant, Washington (Athletic)

=== Offensive line ===
- Tyler Biadasz, Wisconsin (AFCA, AP, Athletic, Athlon, CBS, ESPN, FWAA, Phil Steele, SI, TSN, USAT, WCFF)
- Wyatt Davis, Ohio State (AP, Athletic, Athlon, CBS, ESPN, TSN, USAT)
- Kevin Dotson, Louisiana (AP, SI, USAT)
- Alex Leatherwood, Alabama (AFCA)
- Shane Lemieux, Oregon (SI)
- Damien Lewis, LSU (Athletic)
- Penei Sewell, Oregon (AFCA, AP, Athletic, Athlon, CBS, ESPN, FWAA, Phil Steele, SI, TSN, USAT, WCFF)
- John Simpson, Clemson (AFCA, FWAA, Phil Steele, TSN, WCFF, ESPN)
- Andrew Thomas, Georgia (AFCA, AP, Athlon, CBS, ESPN, FWAA, Phil Steele, SI, TSN, WCFF)
- Jedrick Wills, Alabama (Athletic, Athlon, CBS, USAT)
- Tristan Wirfs, Iowa (FWAA, Phil Steele, WCFF)

== Defense ==
=== Defensive line ===
- Bradlee Anae, Utah (AFCA, ESPN, FWAA, Phil Steele, SI, USAT, TSN, WCFF)
- Derrick Brown, Auburn (AFCA, AP, Athletic, Athlon, CBS, ESPN, FWAA, Phil Steele, SI, TSN, USAT, WCFF)
- A. J. Epenesa, Iowa (Athletic)
- Javon Kinlaw, South Carolina (AP)
- James Lynch, Baylor (AFCA, AP, Athletic, Athlon, CBS, ESPN, FWAA, Phil Steele, TSN, USAT, WCFF)
- Quincy Roche, Temple (SI)
- Curtis Weaver, Boise State (Athlon, CBS, WCFF)
- Chase Young, Ohio State (AFCA, AP, Athletic, Athlon, CBS, ESPN, FWAA, Phil Steele, SI, TSN, USAT, WCFF)

=== Linebacker ===
- Zack Baun, Wisconsin (FWAA, Phil Steele, WCFF)
- Jonathan Greenard, Florida (CBS)
- Micah Parsons, Penn State (AFCA, AP, Athlon, ESPN, SI, USAT)
- Hamilcar Rashed Jr., Oregon State (Athletic, Phil Steele, SI)
- Isaiah Simmons, Clemson (AFCA, AP, Athletic, Athlon, CBS, ESPN, FWAA, Phil Steele, SI, USAT, TSN, WCFF)
- Curtis Weaver, Boise State (TSN)
- Evan Weaver, California (AFCA, AP, Athletic, Athlon, CBS, ESPN, FWAA, Phil Steele, TSN, USAT, WCFF)

=== Defensive back ===
- Julian Blackmon, Utah (Athletic, SI)
- Grant Delpit, LSU (AFCA, CBS, TSN, WCFF)
- Xavier McKinney, Alabama (Athlon, ESPN, USAT)
- Jeff Okudah, Ohio State (AFCA, AP, Athletic, Athlon, CBS, ESPN, FWAA, Phil Steele, SI, TSN, USAT, WCFF)
- Amik Robertson, Louisiana Tech (FWAA, Phil Steele)
- J. R. Reed, Georgia (AP, FWAA, Phil Steele, WCFF)
- Derek Stingley Jr., LSU (AFCA, AP, Athletic, Athlon, CBS, ESPN, SI, TSN, USAT)
- Antoine Winfield Jr., Minnesota (AFCA, AP, Athletic, Athlon, CBS, ESPN, FWAA, Phil Steele, SI, TSN, USAT, WCFF)

== Special teams ==
=== Kicker ===
- Rodrigo Blankenship, Georgia (AFCA, SI, USAT, WCFF)
- Gabe Brkic, Oklahoma (CBS)
- Keith Duncan, Iowa (AP, Athletic, Athlon, Phil Steele, TSN, FWAA)
- Nick Sciba, Wake Forest (ESPN)

=== Punter ===
- Max Duffy, Kentucky (AFCA, AP, Athletic, Athlon, ESPN, FWAA, Phil Steele, TSN, USAT, WCFF)
- Braden Mann, Texas A&M (CBS, SI)

=== All-purpose / return specialist ===
- Lynn Bowden, Kentucky (AFCA, AP, Athletic, Athlon, CBS, ESPN, Phil Steele, SI, TSN, USAT)
- J. K. Dobbins, Ohio State (FWAA)
- Joe Reed, Virginia (Athlon, CBS, FWAA, Phil Steele, WCFF)
- Jaylen Waddle, Alabama (Athlon, CBS, FWAA, Phil Steele, SI, TSN, USAT)
- Steven Wirtel, Iowa State (Phil Steele)
- Joshua Youngblood, Kansas State (ESPN)

== See also ==
- 2019 All-ACC football team
- 2019 All-Big Ten Conference football team
- 2019 All-Big 12 Conference football team
- 2019 All-Pac-12 Conference football team
- 2019 All-SEC football team
- 2019 All-AAC football team
- 2019 All-Conference USA football team
- 2019 All-MAC football team
- 2019 All-Mountain West football team
- 2019 All-Sun Belt football team
