= 2019 All-SEC football team =

American college football all-star team

The 2019 All-SEC football team consists of American football players selected to the All-Southeastern Conference (SEC) chosen by the Associated Press (AP) and the conference coaches for the 2019 Southeastern Conference football season.

LSU won the conference, beating Georgia 37–10 in the SEC Championship.

LSU quarterback Joe Burrow was voted the AP SEC Offensive Player of the Year. Auburn defensive tackle Derrick Brown was voted the AP SEC Defensive Player of the Year.

== Offensive selections ==
=== Quarterbacks ===
- Joe Burrow, LSU (AP-1, Coaches-1)
- Tua Tagovailoa, Alabama (AP-2, Coaches-2)

=== Running backs ===
- Clyde Edwards-Helaire, LSU (AP-1, Coaches-1)
- Kylin Hill, Miss St (AP-1, Coaches-2)
- D'Andre Swift, Georgia (AP-2, Coaches-1)
- Najee Harris, Alabama (AP-2, Coaches-2)

=== Wide receivers ===
- Ja'Marr Chase, LSU (AP-1, Coaches-1)
- Jerry Jeudy, Alabama (AP-2, Coaches-1)
- DeVonta Smith, Alabama (AP-1, Coaches-2)
- Justin Jefferson, LSU (AP-2)
- Bryan Edwards, South Carolina (Coaches-2)

=== Centers ===
- Lloyd Cushenberry, LSU (Coaches-1)
- Drake Jackson, Kentucky (AP-1)
- Landon Dickerson, Alabama (Coaches-2)
- Trey Hill, Georgia (AP-2)

=== Guards ===
- Trey Smith, Tennessee (AP-1, Coaches-1)
- Logan Stenberg, Kentucky (AP-1, Coaches-2)
- Landon Dickerson, Alabama (AP-2)
- Damien Lewis, LSU (AP-2, Coaches-2)

=== Tackles ===
- Andrew Thomas, Georgia (AP-1, Coaches-1)
- Jedrick Wills Jr., Alabama (AP-1, Coaches-1)
- Alex Leatherwood, Alabama (AP-2, Coaches-1)
- Adrian Magee, LSU (Coaches-2)
- Prince Tega Wanogho, Auburn (Coaches-2)
- Isaiah Wilson, Georgia (AP-2)

=== Tight ends ===
- Kyle Pitts, Florida (AP-1, Coaches-1)
- Albert Okwuegbunam, Missouri (Coaches-2)
- Jalen Wydermyer, Texas A&M (AP-2)

== Defensive selections ==
=== Defensive ends ===
- Marlon Davidson, Auburn (AP-1, Coaches-1)
- Jonathan Greenard, Florida (AP-1, Coaches-1)
- Raekwon Davis, Alabama (Coaches-2)
- Chauncey Rivers, Miss St (AP-2)
- D. J. Wonnum, South Carolina (AP-2)

=== Defensive tackles ===
- Derrick Brown, Auburn (AP-1, Coaches-1)
- Jordan Elliott, Missouri (AP-1)
- Javon Kinlaw, South Carolina (AP-2, Coaches-1)
- Tyler Clark, Georgia (Coaches-2)
- Benito Jones, Ole Miss (Coaches-2)
- Rashard Lawrence, LSU (Coaches-2)
- Justin Madubuike, Texas A&M (AP-2)

=== Linebackers ===
- Nick Bolton, Missouri (AP-1, Coaches-1)
- Anfernee Jennings, Alabama (AP-1, Coaches-1)
- K. J. Britt, Auburn (AP-1; Coaches-2)
- K'Lavon Chaisson, LSU (AP-2, Coaches-1)
- Daniel Bituli, Tennessee (Coaches-2)
- De'Jon Harris, Arkansas (AP-2)
- Terrell Lewis, Alabama (Coaches-2)
- David Reese, Florida (AP-2)
- Monty Rice, Georgia (AP-2)

=== Cornerbacks ===
- Trevon Diggs, Alabama (AP-1; Coaches-2)
- C. J. Henderson, Florida (Coaches-1)
- Derek Stingley Jr., LSU (AP-1; Coaches-2)
- Israel Mukuamu, South Carolina (AP-2)
- Kristian Fulton, LSU (AP-2)
- Eric Stokes, Georgia (AP-2)

=== Safeties ===
- Xavier McKinney, Alabama (AP-1, Coaches-1)
- Grant Delpit, LSU (AP-2, Coaches-1)
- Nigel Warrior, Tennessee (AP-1, Coaches-2)
- J. R. Reed, Georgia (Coaches-1)
- Jeremiah Dinson, Auburn (AP-2)
- JaCoby Stevens, LSU (Coaches-2)

== Special teams ==
=== Kickers ===
- Rodrigo Blankenship, Georgia (AP-1, Coaches-1)
- Brent Cimaglia, Tennessee (Coaches-2)
- Cade York, LSU (AP-2)

=== Punters ===
- Max Duffy, Kentucky (AP-1, Coaches-2)
- Braden Mann, Texas A&M (AP-2, Coaches-1)

=== All purpose/return specialist ===
- Lynn Bowden, Kentucky (AP-1, Coaches-1)
- Jaylen Waddle, Alabama (AP-2, Coaches-1)
- Jerrion Ealy, Ole Miss (Coaches-2)
- Treylon Burks, Arkansas (Coaches-2)
- Clyde Edwards-Helaire, LSU (Coaches-2)
- Christian Tutt, Auburn (Coaches-2)
- Marquez Callaway, Tennessee (Coaches-2)

== Key ==
Bold = Consensus first-team selection by both the coaches and AP

AP = Associated Press

Coaches = Selected by the SEC coaches

== See also ==
- 2019 Southeastern Conference football season
- 2019 College Football All-America Team
