= Derrick Brown =

American football player (born 1998)

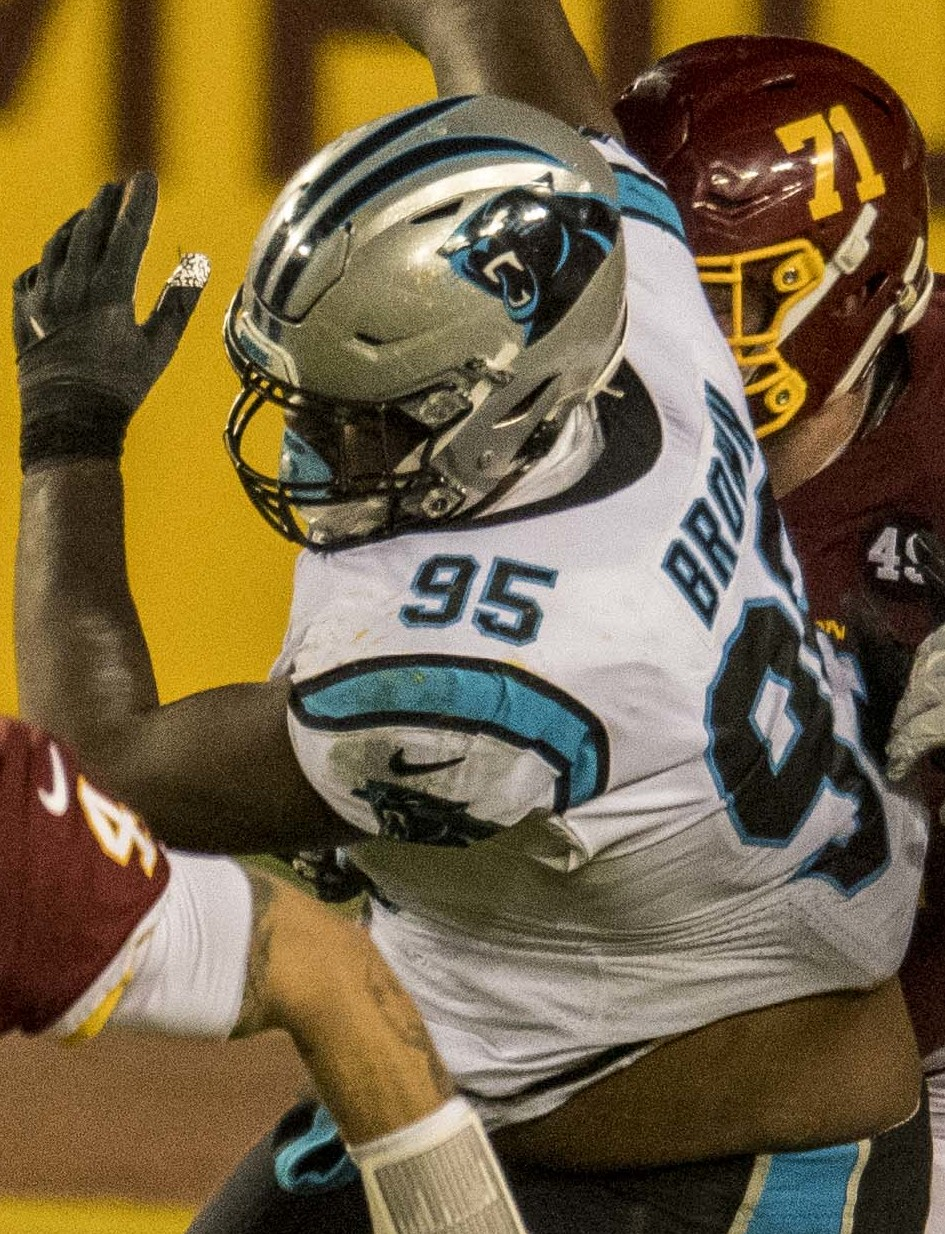
- Brown with the Carolina Panthers in 2020

No. 95 – Carolina Panthers
- Position: Defensive tackle
- Roster status: Active

Personal information
- Born: April 15, 1998 (age 28); Sugar Hill, Georgia, U.S.
- Listed height: 6 ft 5 in (1.96 m)
- Listed weight: 330 lb (150 kg)

Career information
- High school: Lanier (Sugar Hill)
- College: Auburn (2016–2019)
- NFL draft: 2020: 1st round, 7th overall pick

Career history
- Carolina Panthers (2020–present)

Awards and highlights
- Pro Bowl (2023); PFWA All-Rookie Team (2020); Lott Trophy (2019); Unanimous All-American (2019); SEC Defensive Player of the Year (2019); First-team All–SEC (2019); Second-team All-SEC (2018)

Career NFL statistics as of Week 4, 2026
- Total tackles: 332
- Sacks: 13
- Forced fumbles: 1
- Pass deflections: 31
- Interceptions: 2
- Stats at Pro Football Reference

Derrick Brown (born April 15, 1998) is an American professional football defensive tackle for the Carolina Panthers of the National Football League (NFL). He played college football for the Auburn Tigers, earning unanimous All-American honors and being named the SEC Defensive Player of the Year in 2019. Brown was selected seventh overall by the Panthers in the 2020 NFL draft and earned his first Pro Bowl selection following the 2023 season.

== Early life ==
Brown attended Lanier High School, where he played defensive tackle. During his high school career, he recorded 270 tackles, 33.5 quarterback sacks, five forced fumbles and three interceptions.

The 247Sports Composite ranked Brown as the No. 9 overall recruit, No. 4 defensive tackle and No. 1 player in Georgia in the class of 2016. A five-star recruit, he committed to play college football for the Auburn Tigers on February 3, 2016.

== College career ==
As a freshman in 2016, Brown played in all 13 games and recorded 11 tackles, including 1.5 tackles for loss and one sack, and recovered a fumble. As a sophomore in 2017, he started all 14 games and recorded 56 tackles, including nine tackles for loss and 3.5 sacks, and two forced fumbles.

As a junior in 2018, Brown recorded 48 tackles, including 10.5 tackles for loss and 4.5 sacks. He earned second-team All-Southeastern Conference (SEC) honors. As a senior in 2019, he recorded 55 tackles, including 12.5 tackles for loss and four sacks, along with two forced fumbles and four pass breakups. He earned unanimous All-American honors and was named the SEC Defensive Player of the Year. He also won the Lott IMPACT Trophy and the Senior CLASS Award.

== Professional career ==
Pre-draft measurables
Height	Weight	Arm length	Hand span	Wingspan	40-yard dash	10-yard split	20-yard split	20-yard shuttle	Three-cone drill	Vertical jump	Broad jump	Bench press
6 ft 4 5/8 in (1.95 m)	326 lb (148 kg)	34 1/4 in (0.87 m)	9 in (0.23 m)	6 ft 8 7/8 in (2.05 m)	5.16 s	1.73 s	2.98 s	4.79 s	8.22 s	27.0 in (0.69 m)	9 ft 0 in (2.74 m)	28 reps
All values from NFL Combine

Brown was selected seventh overall by the Carolina Panthers in the 2020 NFL draft. He signed his four-year rookie contract on May 13, 2020, worth a fully guaranteed $23.621 million.

=== 2020–2022 ===
Brown spent four days on the reserve/COVID-19 list in December 2020. In Week 15 against the Green Bay Packers, Brown recorded his first two career sacks on Aaron Rodgers during the 24–16 loss. He finished his rookie season with 34 tackles and two sacks in 16 games, including 15 starts, and was named to the PFWA All-Rookie Team.

In the 2021 season, Brown played in 16 games, making 14 starts, and recorded 41 tackles and three sacks.

Brown started all 17 games in 2022 and recorded 67 tackles and one sack. His tackle total tied Mike Rucker's single-season franchise record for a defensive lineman. In Week 3 of the 2022 season against the New Orleans Saints, Brown recorded his first career interception on Jameis Winston in the Panthers' 22–14 win.

=== 2023 season ===
In the 2023 season, Brown recorded 103 combined tackles, setting an NFL single-season record for a defensive lineman in records dating to 1994. On January 19, 2024, he was selected to the 2024 Pro Bowl Games as a replacement for Los Angeles Rams defensive tackle Aaron Donald.

=== 2024–present ===
On April 5, 2024, Brown agreed to a four-year, $96 million contract extension with the Panthers. The deal included $63.165 million guaranteed.

Brown suffered a season-ending knee injury in Week 1 of the 2024 season and was placed on injured reserve on September 10, 2024.

Brown returned in 2025, playing in all 17 regular-season games and recording 73 tackles and a career-high five sacks. His teammates selected him as the Panthers' recipient of the Ed Block Courage Award for 2025.

Brown made his postseason debut in the 2025–26 NFL playoffs. He recorded five tackles in the Panthers' 31–34 loss to the Rams in the Wild Card Round on January 10, 2026.

He ranked 90th in the NFL Top 100 Players of 2026, his first appearance on the list.

== Career statistics ==
=== NFL ===
Legend
	NFL record (DT position)
**Bold**	Career high

==== Regular season ====
Year	Team	GP	GS	Tackles						Interceptions			Fumbles	
Year	Team	GP	GS	Solo	Ast	Tot	TFL	Sk	QBHits	Int	Yds	PD	FF	FR
2020	CAR	16	15	21	13	34	**8**	2.0	12	0	0	4	0	0
2021	CAR	16	14	27	14	41	**8**	3.0	9	0	0	4	0	0
2022	CAR	**17**	**17**	30	37	67	5	1.0	12	**1**	0	**7**	0	0
2023	CAR	**17**	**17**	**57**	**46**	**103**	7	2.0	**15**	**1**	**2**	6	0	0
2024	CAR	1	1	1	2	3	0	0.0	0	0	0	0	0	0
2025	CAR	**17**	**17**	33	40	73	5	**5.0**	11	0	0	**7**	**1**	0
2026	CAR	4	4	8	3	11	0	0.0	1	0	0	3	0	0
Career		88	85	177	155	332	33	13.0	60	2	2	31	1	0

==== Postseason ====
Year	Team	GP	GS	Tackles						Interceptions			Fumbles	
Year	Team	GP	GS	Solo	Ast	Tot	TFL	Sk	QBHits	Int	Yds	PD	FF	FR
2025	CAR	1	1	4	1	5	0	0.0	1	0	0	0	0	0
Career		1	1	4	1	5	0	0.0	1	0	0	0	0	0

=== College ===
College statistics, including postseason games
Year	Team	Class	GP	Tackles					Pass defense		Fumbles	
Year	Team	Class	GP	Solo	Ast	Tot	TFL	Sk	Int	PD	FF	FR
2016	Auburn	FR	13	3	8	11	1.5	1.0	0	1	0	1
2017	Auburn	SO	14	28	28	56	9.0	3.5	0	1	2	0
2018	Auburn	JR	13	24	24	48	10.5	4.5	0	2	1	1
2019	Auburn	SR	13	33	22	55	12.5	4.0	0	4	2	2
Career			**53**	**88**	**82**	**170**	**33.5**	**13.0**	**0**	**8**	**5**	**4**

== Personal life ==
By July 2025, Brown and his wife had four children.
