= Lloyd Cushenberry =

American football player (born 1997)

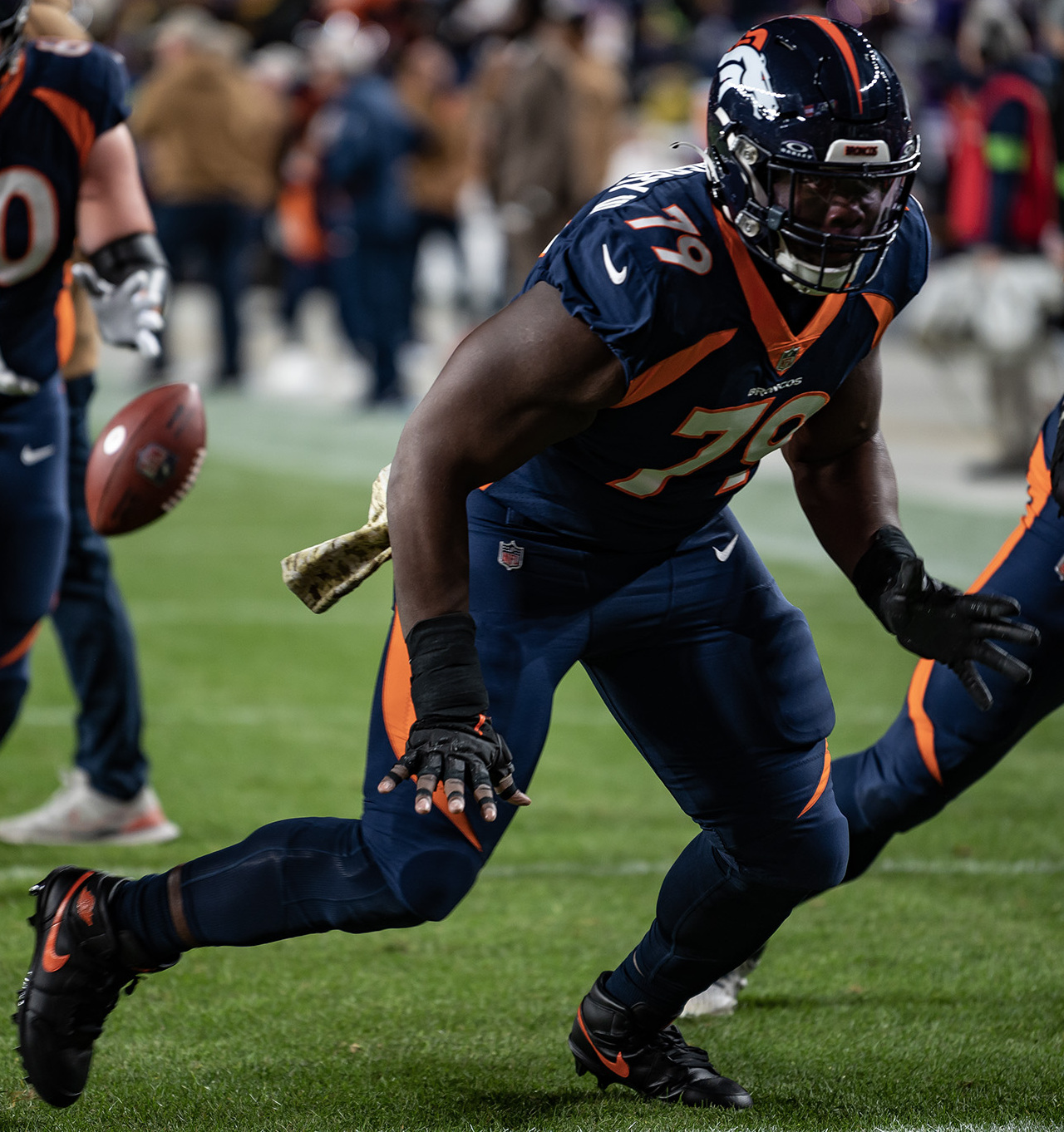
- Cushenberry with the Denver Broncos in 2023

No. 53 – Buffalo Bills
- Position: Center
- Roster status: Active

Personal information
- Born: November 22, 1997 (age 28); Carville, Louisiana, U.S.
- Listed height: 6 ft 4 in (1.93 m)
- Listed weight: 315 lb (143 kg)

Career information
- High school: Dutchtown (Geismar, Louisiana)
- College: LSU (2016–2019)
- NFL draft: 2020: 3rd round, 83rd overall pick

Career history
- Denver Broncos (2020–2023); Tennessee Titans (2024–2025); Buffalo Bills (2026–present)

Awards and highlights
- PFWA All-Rookie Team (2020); CFP national champion (2019); First-team All-SEC (2019)

Career NFL statistics as of 2025
- Games played: 80
- Games started: 80
- Stats at Pro Football Reference

Lloyd Cushenberry III (born November 22, 1997) is an American professional football center for the Buffalo Bills of the National Football League (NFL). He played college football for the LSU Tigers and was drafted by the Denver Broncos in the third round of the 2020 NFL draft.

== Early life ==
Cushenberry grew up in Carville, Louisiana and attended Dutchtown High School. Cushenberry initially committed to play college football for the South Carolina Gamecocks, but de-committed before choosing LSU.

== College career ==
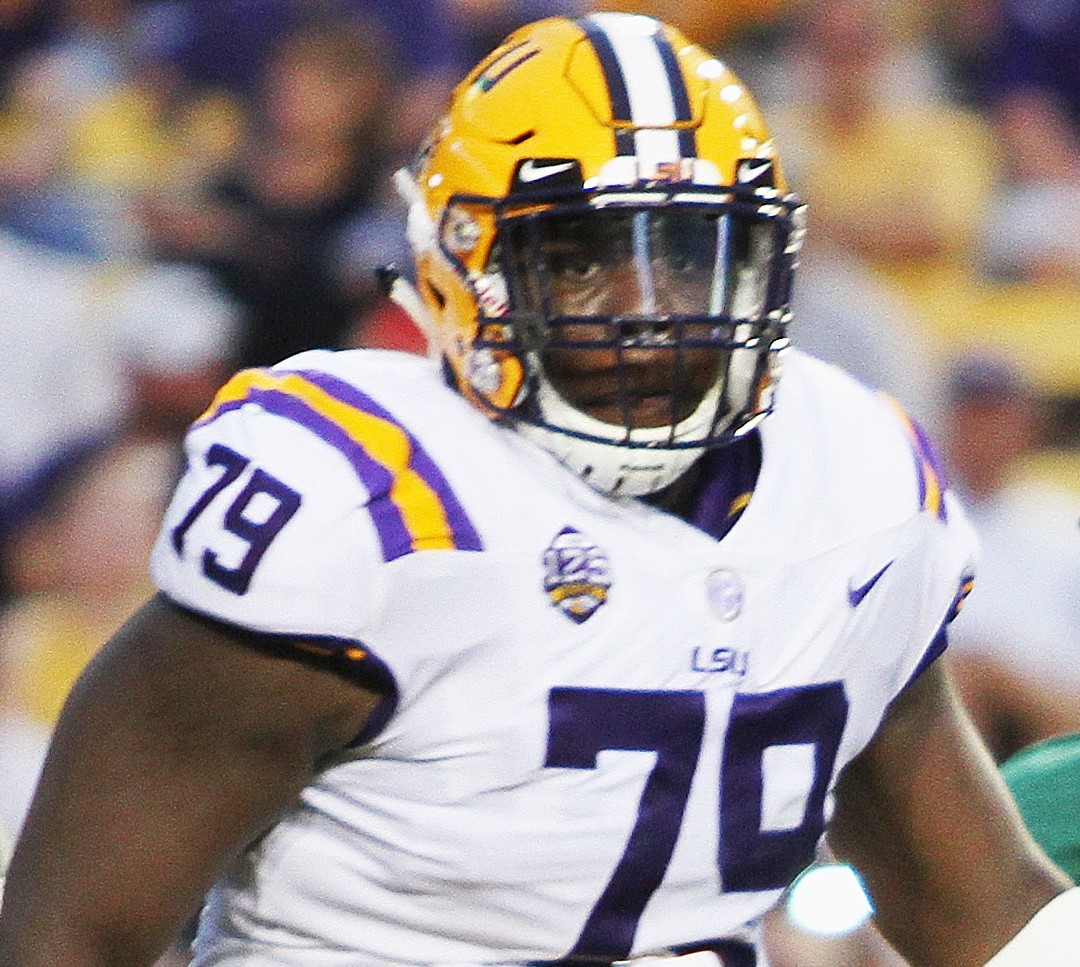
Cushenberry with LSU in 2018

Cushenberry redshirted his true freshman season. As a redshirt freshman, Cushenberry played in 11 total games with six games played on offense. Cushenberry entered his redshirt sophomore year as the Tigers' starting center. Cushenberry was named first-team All-SEC as a redshirt junior. Following the end of the season, Cushenberry announced that he would forgo his final season to enter the 2020 NFL draft.

== Professional career ==
Pre-draft measurables
Height	Weight	Arm length	Hand span	Wingspan	40-yard dash	10-yard split	20-yard split	Bench press	Wonderlic
6 ft 3 1/8 in (1.91 m)	312 lb (142 kg)	34 1/8 in (0.87 m)	10 3/8 in (0.26 m)	7 ft 0 1/4 in (2.14 m)	5.27 s	1.82 s	3.01 s	25 reps	15
All values from NFL Combine

=== Denver Broncos ===
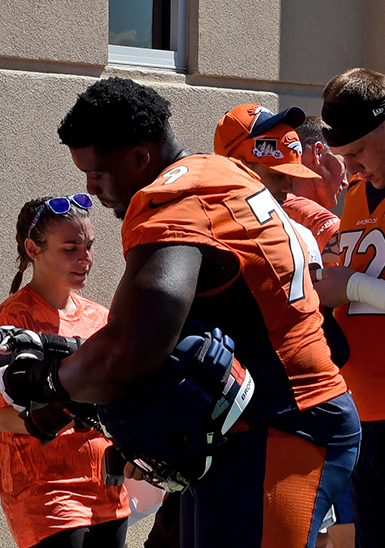
Cushenberry with the Broncos in 2023

Cushenberry was selected by the Denver Broncos with the 83rd overall pick in the third round of the 2020 NFL Draft. Cushenberry was named the Broncos starting center going into his rookie season. He made his NFL debut on September 14, 2020 when he started in the season opener against the Tennessee Titans. Cushenberry finished his rookie season starting all 16 games and playing in every single offensive snap. He was named to the PFWA All-Rookie Team.

Cushenberry continued to play starting center for most games through the 2021 and 2022 seasons. On November 8, 2022, Cushenberry was placed on injured reserve after suffering a groin strain. According to Cushenberry, Denver "kept him on IR after he had recovered from his groin injury," and the Broncos did not reactivate him for the rest of the year. He returned for the 2023 season, playing all games once again as starting center.

=== Tennessee Titans ===
On March 14, 2024, Cushenberry signed a four-year, $50 million contract with the Tennessee Titans. On November 6, Cushenberry was placed on injured reserve after suffering a season–ending Achilles tendon tear in Week 9. He had played 8 games as starting center and team captain for the 2024 season, having played every offensive snap before his injury, and logged one fumble recovery.

On the first day of training camp, the Titans placed Cushenberry on Active/physically unable to perform list on July 24, 2025. He was activated on August 11. On February 25, 2026, Cushenberry was released by the Titans.

=== Buffalo Bills ===
On March 26, 2026, Cushenberry signed with the Buffalo Bills on a one-year contract.
