= Rashard Lawrence =

American football player (born 1998)

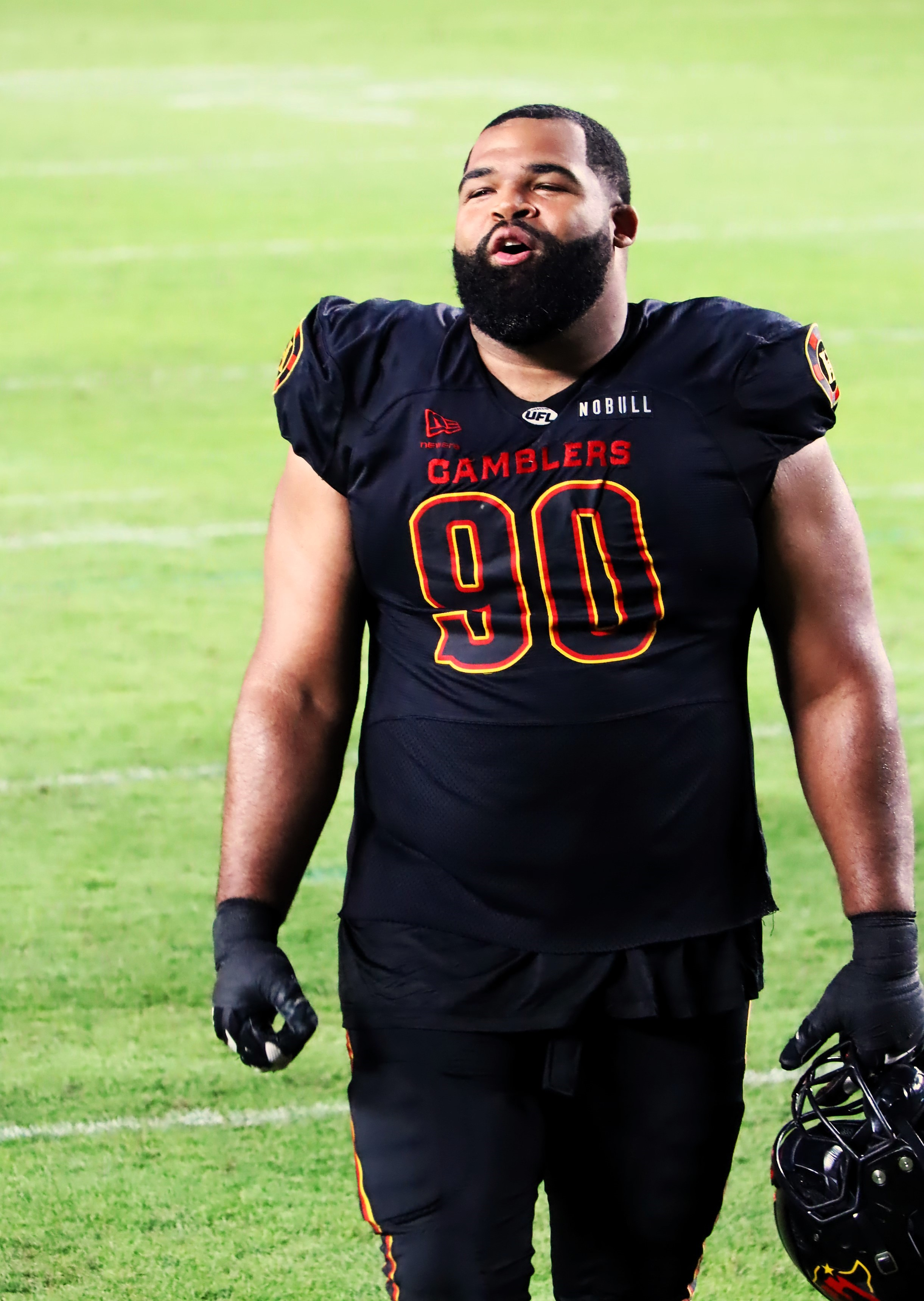
- Lawrence with the Houston Gamblers in 2026

No. 90 – Dallas Renegades
- Position: Nose tackle

Personal information
- Born: August 27, 1998 (age 28); Monroe, Louisiana, U.S.
- Listed height: 6 ft 2 in (1.88 m)
- Listed weight: 312 lb (142 kg)

Career information
- High school: Neville (Monroe, Louisiana)
- College: LSU (2016–2019)
- NFL draft: 2020: 4th round, 131st overall pick

Career history
- Arizona Cardinals (2020–2022); Miami Dolphins (2023)*; Carolina Panthers (2023)*; Houston Texans (2023)*; Denver Broncos (2024)*; San Antonio Brahmas (2025); Houston Gamblers (2026); Dallas Renegades (2027–present)
- * Offseason or practice squad member only

Awards and highlights
- CFP national champion (2019); Second-team All-SEC (2019)

Career NFL statistics
- Total tackles: 30
- Forced fumbles: 1
- Stats at Pro Football Reference

Rashard Lawrence (born August 27, 1998) is an American professional football nose tackle for the Dallas Renegades of the United Football League (UFL). He played college football for the LSU Tigers and was selected by the Arizona Cardinals in the fourth round of the 2020 NFL draft.

== Early life ==
Lawrence attended Neville High School in Monroe, Louisiana. He was selected to play in the 2016 Under Armour All-America Game, but did not play due to injury. A five-star recruit, he committed to Louisiana State University (LSU) to play college football.

== College career ==
As a true freshman at LSU in 2016, Lawrence played in nine games and had six tackles and one sack. He became a starter his sophomore year in 2017. He started 10 games, recording 32 tackles and 1.5 sacks. As a junior in 2018, he started all 13 games, finishing with 54 tackles and four sacks. He was named the MVP of the 2019 Fiesta Bowl after recording two sacks. Lawrence returned to LSU for his senior year in 2019, rather than enter the 2019 NFL draft.

== Professional career ==
Pre-draft measurables
Height	Weight	Arm length	Hand span	Wingspan	40-yard dash	10-yard split	20-yard split	Three-cone drill	Bench press
6 ft 2 in (1.88 m)	308 lb (140 kg)	34 1/8 in (0.87 m)	11 in (0.28 m)	6 ft 8 3/8 in (2.04 m)	5.07 s	1.72 s	2.88 s	8.03 s	22 reps
All values from NFL Combine

=== Arizona Cardinals ===
Lawrence was selected by the Arizona Cardinals in the fourth round with the 131st overall pick of the 2020 NFL draft. He was placed on injured reserve on October 17, 2020, with a calf injury. He was activated on December 1, 2020.

Lawrence entered the 2021 season as the Cardinals starting nose tackle. He was placed on injured reserve on November 6, 2021 with a calf injury. He was activated on December 13.

On October 26, 2022, Lawrence was placed on injured reserve after suffering a shoulder injury in Week 7.

On August 29, 2023, Lawrence was released by the Cardinals as part of final roster cuts before the start of the 2023 season.

=== Miami Dolphins ===
On August 31, 2023, Lawrence was signed to the Miami Dolphins practice squad. He was released on November 7.

=== Carolina Panthers ===
On November 10, 2023, Lawrence was signed to the Carolina Panthers practice squad. He was released on November 28.

=== Houston Texans ===
On November 30, 2023, Lawrence was signed to the Houston Texans practice squad. He was released on January 17, 2024.

=== Denver Broncos ===
On January 24, 2024, Lawrence signed a futures contract with the Denver Broncos. Lawrence was released by the Broncos on May 10.

=== San Antonio Brahmas ===
On November 7, 2024, Lawrence signed with the San Antonio Brahmas of the United Football League (UFL).

=== Houston Gamblers ===
On January 12, 2026, Lawrence signed with the Houston Gamblers of the United Football League (UFL).
