= Max Duffy =

Australian player of multiple football codes

Personal information
- Born: 11 April 1993 (age 33) Perth, Western Australia
- Height: 185 cm (6 ft 1 in)
- Weight: 84 kg (185 lb)
Australian rules football career
Personal information
- Original team: East Fremantle (WAFL)
- Draft: No. 39, 2012 National Draft, Fremantle
- Position: Forward
Playing career^{1}
Years	Club	Games (Goals)
2013–2015	Fremantle	3 (3)
- ^{1} Playing statistics correct to the end of 2015.

Sport
- Football career

No. 18
- Position: Punter

Career information
- High school: Kent Street Senior High School
- College: Kentucky
- NFL draft: 2021: undrafted
- CFL draft: 2021G: 4th round, 30th overall pick

Career history
- Denver Broncos (2021)*; Pittsburgh Maulers (2022)
- * Offseason or practice squad member only

Awards and highlights
- Ray Guy Award (2019); Unanimous All-American (2019); First-team All-SEC (2019); Second-team All-SEC (2020)

Max Duffy (born 11 April 1993) is an Australian former American football punter. He was the punter for the Kentucky Wildcats and also an Australian rules footballer who played for the Fremantle Football Club in the Australian Football League (AFL).

Duffy attended Kent Street Senior High School.

He mainly played basketball as a junior and only converted to Australian rules football after missing selection in a state squad. He was not selected in the first two AFL drafts that he nominated for, and was working as a tree lopper while playing for East Fremantle in the West Australian Football League (WAFL) when he was recruited with 39th draft pick in the 2012 AFL draft.

== Australian football career ==
Due to a series of shoulder and hamstring injuries, Duffy spent significant periods of the 2013 and 2014 seasons out of the game. He made his debut for the Fremantle Football Club in round 20, 2014 against Geelong following some good form in the WAFL for Peel. After starting the game as the substitute, he kicked a goal with his first kick in the AFL and kicked a second goal late in the last quarter, however, Fremantle lost by two points.

Duffy was delisted at the conclusion of the 2015 season. He then joined West Perth in the WAFL for the 2016 season. Prior to the 2017 season, however, he announced his retirement from Australian to train to become an American football punter.

== American football career ==
In December 2017, Duffy was signed by the Kentucky Wildcats as a punter. Ray Guy’s ProKicker.com rated him as the top 2018 punting prospect. Duffy earned GPR Analytics National Punter of the Year in 2019 with an NCAA leading 98.30 GPR Punt Rating

Duffy was drafted by the Toronto Argonauts in the fourth round of the 2021 CFL global draft on 15 April 2021. He signed with the Denver Broncos of the NFL as an undrafted free agent on 24 May 2021. He was waived on June 17.

On 10 March 2022, Duffy was drafted by the Pittsburgh Maulers of the United States Football League.

== Statistics ==
Statistics are correct to the end of the 2015 season

Legend
G	Goals	K	Kicks	D	Disposals	T	Tackles
B	Behinds	H	Handballs	M	Marks

Season	Team	No.	Games	Totals							Averages (per game)						
Season	Team	No.	Games	G	B	K	H	D	M	T	G	B	K	H	D	M	T
2014	Fremantle	24	2	2	1	7	3	10	2	0	1.0	0.5	3.5	1.5	5.0	1.0	0.0
2015	Fremantle	24	1	1	0	5	7	12	3	1	1.0	0.0	5.0	7.0	12.5	3.0	1.0
Career			3	3	1	12	10	22	5	1	1.0	0.3	4.0	3.3	7.3	1.7	0.3
