= Grant Delpit =

American football player (born 1998)

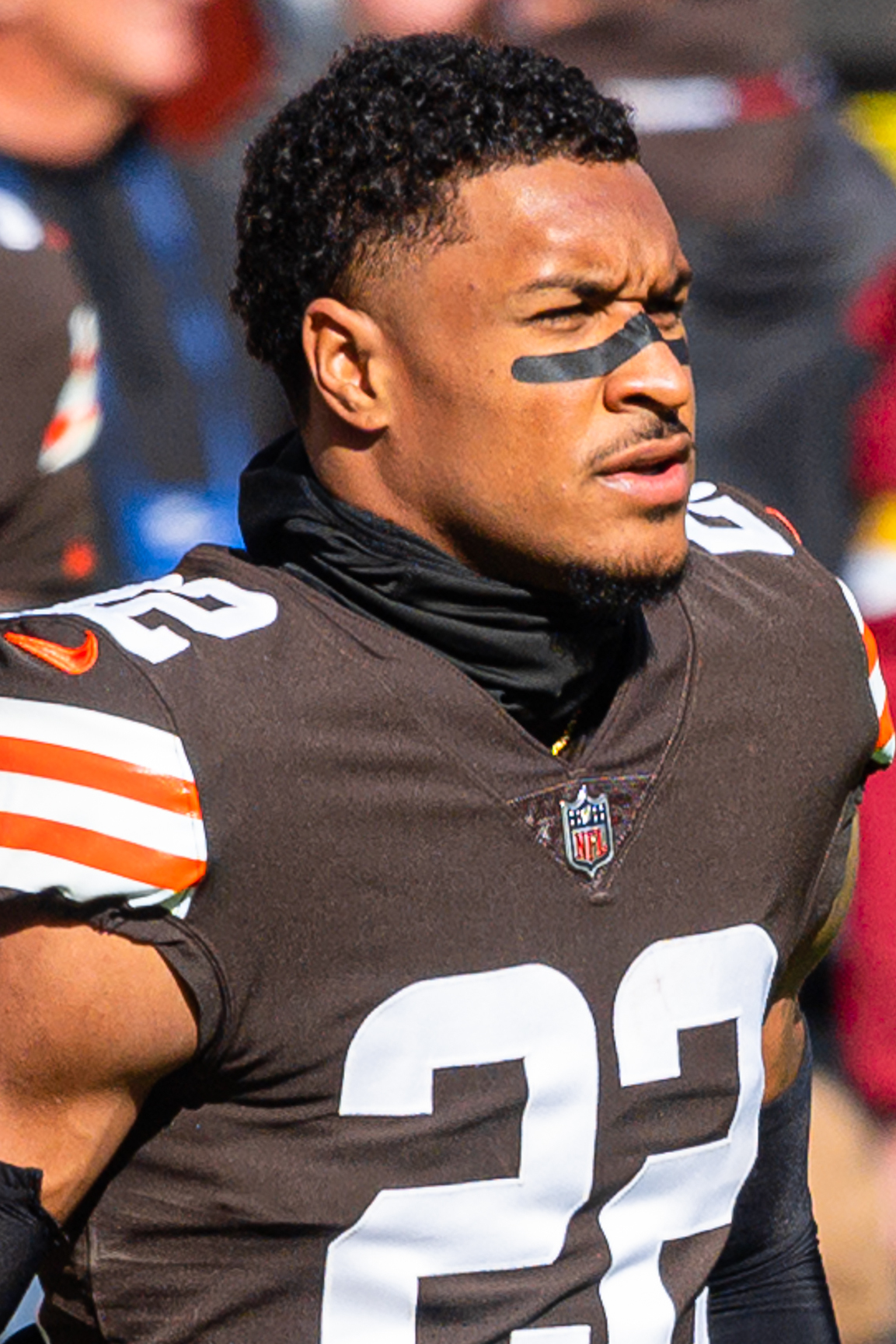
- Delpit with the Cleveland Browns in 2021

No. 9 – Cleveland Browns
- Position: Safety
- Roster status: Active

Personal information
- Born: September 20, 1998 (age 28); New Orleans, Louisiana, U.S.
- Listed height: 6 ft 3 in (1.91 m)
- Listed weight: 208 lb (94 kg)

Career information
- High school: IMG Academy (Bradenton, Florida)
- College: LSU (2017–2019)
- NFL draft: 2020: 2nd round, 44th overall pick

Career history
- Cleveland Browns (2020–present)

Awards and highlights
- CFP national champion (2019); Jim Thorpe Award (2019); Jack Tatum Trophy (2018); Unanimous All-American (2018); Consensus All-American (2019); 2× First-team All-SEC (2018, 2019)

Career NFL statistics as of Week 5, 2026
- Total tackles: 474
- Sacks: 7.5
- Pass deflections: 24
- Interceptions: 8
- Forced fumbles: 3
- Fumble recoveries: 4
- Stats at Pro Football Reference

Grant Jacobs Delpit (born September 20, 1998) is an American professional football safety for the Cleveland Browns of the National Football League (NFL). He played college football for the LSU Tigers, earning consensus All-American honors twice and winning the Jim Thorpe Award as a junior in 2019. He was selected by the Browns in the second round of the 2020 NFL draft.

== Early life ==
Born in New Orleans, Delpit and his family were displaced after Hurricane Katrina and eventually settled in Houston, Texas. Delpit attended St. Thomas High School for two years before transferring to Lamar High School as a junior. For his senior season, he transferred to IMG Academy in Bradenton, Florida, where he was teammates with Dylan Moses. As a senior he had 47 tackles and five interceptions. He committed to Louisiana State University (LSU) to play college football.

== College career ==
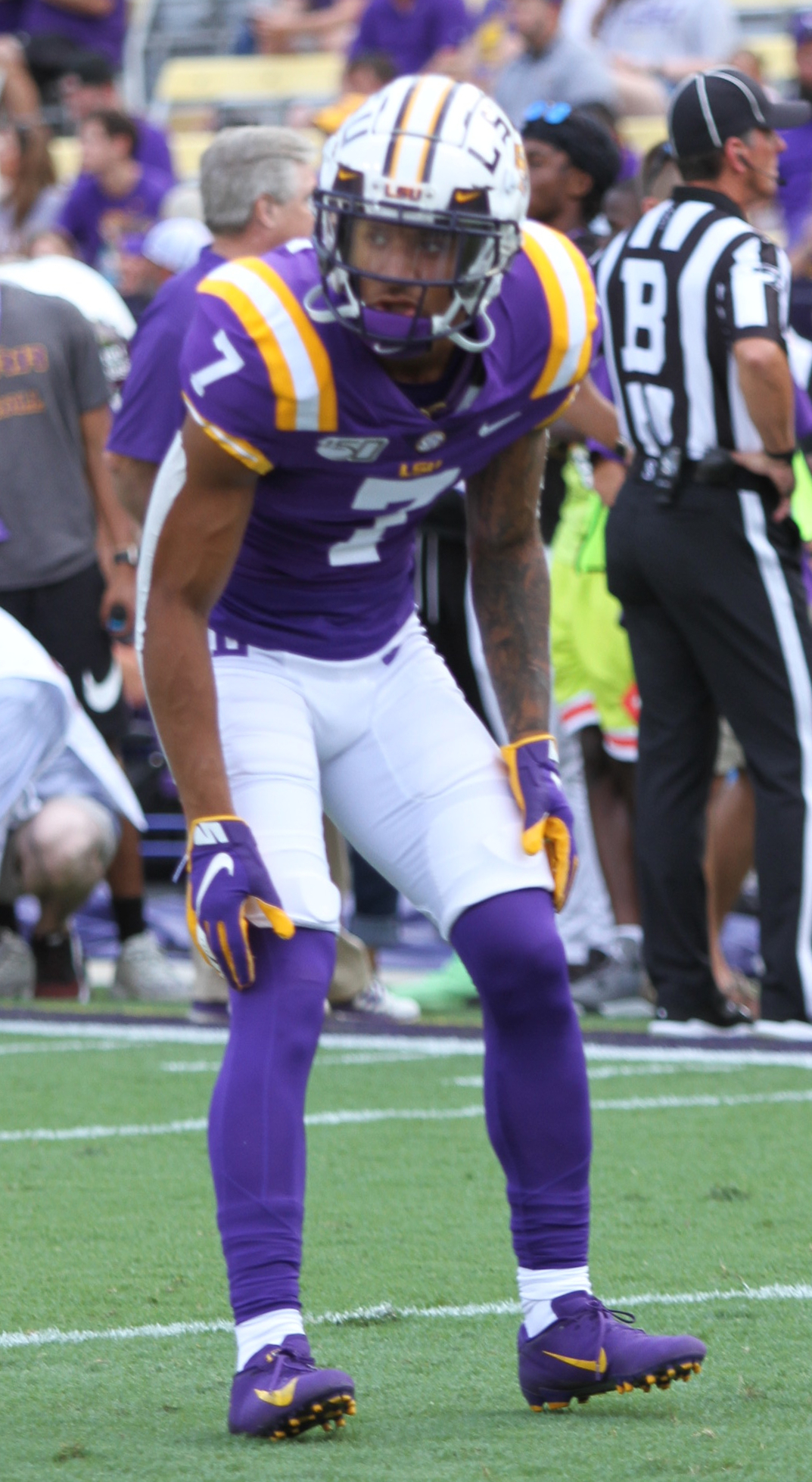
Delpit at LSU

As a true freshman at LSU in 2017, Delpit played in all 13 games with 10 starts, recording 60 tackles and one interception. He returned to LSU as a starter in 2018. Following a junior season where he won the Jim Thorpe Award and a national championship, Delpit announced that he would forgo his senior season and declared for the 2020 NFL draft.

== Professional career ==
=== Pre-draft ===
NFL.com lead analyst Lance Zierlein had Delpit ranked as the second best safety prospect (33rd overall) available in the draft. Former NFL executive Gil Brandt had him ranked as the top safety in the draft (25th overall). NFL draft analysts from Sports Illustrated and USA Today had Delpit ranked as the best safety prospect in the 2020 NFL Draft. Michael Renner of Pro Football Focus had him ranked as the top safety in the draft (15th overall). NFL analyst Daniel Jeremiah had Delpit listed as the second best safety prospect available (40th overall). NFL draft analysts projected Delpit to be selected as early as late in the first round to possibly the second round.

External videos
- 2020 NFL Draft Profile: Grant Delpit

Pre-draft measurables
Height	Weight	Arm length	Hand span	Wingspan	40-yard dash	Wonderlic
6 ft 2 1/2 in (1.89 m)	213 lb (97 kg)	30 3/8 in (0.77 m)	9 1/8 in (0.23 m)	6 ft 2 1/2 in (1.89 m)	4.39 s	27
All values from NFL Combine/40 time from Pro Day

=== 2020 ===
The Cleveland Browns selected Delpit in the second round (44th overall) of the 2020 NFL draft. He was the third safety drafted in 2020.

External videos
- Browns draft Grant Delpit 44th overall
- 2020 NFL Draft: Kevin Stefanski calls Grant Delpit

"Grant Delpit, excited to add him to the team. We really viewed him as a big versatile playmaker. He has been a really kind of an impact player for LSU over the past two seasons. Our appeal to Grant is the fact of his coverage abilities. He is a guy who can play the post. He can play you at the line of scrimmage. He can cover tight ends and walk over a slot and hold his own against receivers. He has been a consistent ball producer throughout his career at LSU. The other thing that stood out to us about Grant is just his toughness. He played through this season and really a lot of the year with a high-ankle sprain that would have put a lot of players out of commission for a longer period of time."

— Andrew Berry (Browns' GM)

On July 15, 2020, the Cleveland Browns signed Delpit to a four-year, $7.46 million contract that includes $3.93 million guaranteed and a signing bonus of $2.98 million.

Throughout training camp, Delpit competed against Andrew Sendejo and Karl Joseph for a role as a starting safety. On August 24, 2020, Delpit sustained an injury during practice and was carted off the practice field. On August 25, 2020, it was announced that Delpit was officially placed on injured reserve after it was confirmed he had torn his Achilles tendon the previous day and would have to undergo surgery while missing his entire rookie season.

=== 2021 ===
During training camp, Delpit competed against Ronnie Harrison to be the starting strong safety after Karl Joseph became a free agent. On August 18, 2021, Delpit reaggravated his hamstring injury and was sidelined for Week 1. Head coach Kevin Stefanski named Delpit the primary backup safety behind starters John Johnson and Ronnie Harrison.

On September 19, 2021, Delpit made his long-awaited professional regular season debut and recorded six combined tackles (three solo), forced a fumble, and earned his first career sack in a 21–31 win against the Houston Texans in the home-opener. Delpit's first career sack was for a 7-yard loss and forced a fumble by backup quarterback Davis Mills in the fourth quarter. In Week 3, he made his first career start as the third safety or fifth defensive back, making one tackle during a 6–26 win over the Chicago Bears. On November 28, 2021, Delpit made two combined tackles (one solo), a pass deflection, and had his first career interception on a pass by Lamar Jackson to tight end Mark Andrews in a 10–16 loss at the Baltimore Ravens. During the game, strong safety Ronnie Harrison sustained an ankle injury that sidelined him for the rest of the season. In response, defensive coordinator Joe Woods selected Delpit to takeover at starting strong safety for the rest of the season. On November 12, 2021, Delpit earned his first start at strong safety and collected a season-high 11 solo tackles during a 24–22 win against the Baltimore Ravens. He was inactive for a 14–16 loss to the Las Vegas Raiders in Week 15 due to COVID-19. He completed the 2021 NFL season with a total of 66 combined tackles (43 solo), three pass deflections, one sack, a forced fumble, and an interception in 15 games and seven starts. Pro Football Focus had Delpit finish the season with an overall grade of 63.8 and a coverage grade of 83.1.

=== 2022 ===
During training camp, Delpit competed against Ronnie Harrison to be the starting strong safety. Defensive coordinator Joe Woods selected Delpit to be the starting strong safety, alongside starting free safety John Johnson. On September 11, 2022, Delpit started in the Cleveland Browns' season-opener at the Carolina Panthers and made three combined tackles (two solo), a pass deflection, and intercepted a pass by Baker Mayfield during a 26–24 victory. In Week 10, he collected a season-high ten combined tackles (six solo) during a 17–39 loss at the Miami Dolphins. On January 1, 2023, Delpit recorded seven combined tackles (four solo), a season-high two pass deflections, and a career-high two interceptions off pass attempts by Carson Wentz as the Browns defeated the Washington Commanders 24–10. He completed the 2022 NFL season with 105 combined tackles (72 solo), ten pass deflections, and four interceptions while starting in all 17 regular season games.

=== 2023 ===
On January 9, 2023, the Cleveland Browns fired defensive coordinator Joe Woods. Defensive coordinator Jim Schwartz chose to retain Delpit as the starting strong safety, along with free safety Juan Thornhill, to kickoff the regular season. In Week 9, he racked up a season-high ten combined tackles (eight solo) and was credited with half a sack as the Browns routed the Arizona Cardinals 27–0.

On December 10, 2023, the Cleveland Browns signed Delpit to a three–year, $36.00 million contract that includes $23.60 million guaranteed, $14.09 million guaranteed upon signing, and a signing bonus of $6.00 million. The Cleveland Browns played the Jacksonville Jaguars the same day and Delpit recorded six combined tackles (five solo) and one sack before exiting the 31–27 victory due to an injury he sustained while blitzing Trevor Lawrence. On December 13, 2023, the Cleveland Browns officially placed Delpit on injured reserve for the rest of the season (Weeks 14–18) due to a groin injury. He finished the 2023 NFL season with a total of 80 combined tackles (63 solo), four pass deflections, one interception, and a fumble recovery in 13 games and 13 starts. On January 3, 2024, it was announced that Delpit was selected to be an alternate for the upcoming 2024 Pro Bowl.

=== 2024 ===
Entering his fifth season, Delpit returned as the starting strong safety under head coach Kevin Stefanski and was paired with free safety Juan Thornhill. He opted to change his jersey number from No. 22 to No. 9. Delpit wore No. 9 at the beginning of his collegiate career at LSU and chose it after it became available following the departure of wide receiver Jakeem Grant.

In Week 5, Delpit had seven combined tackles (five solo) in the Browns' 13–34 loss at the Washington Commanders, before exiting in the fourth quarter due to an injury. The following week, Delpit was inactive for the Browns' 16–20 loss at the Philadelphia Eagles due to a head injury. In Week 12, he collected a season-high ten combined tackles (six solo) during a 14–27 loss at the Pittsburgh Steelers. The following week, he made six combined tackles (five solo) before leaving in the fourth quarter of a 32–41 loss at the Denver Broncos due to a concussion. In 2024, he produced a total of 111 combined tackles (72 solo), one pass deflection, and one sack while starting in the 16 games he appeared in.

=== 2025 ===
In Week 7, Delpit had two special teams tackles and a forced fumble in a 31-6 win over the Miami Dolphins, earning AFC Special Teams Player of the Week.

=== 2026 ===
On July 30, 2026, Delpit signed a three–year, $48 million contract extension with the Browns.

== NFL career statistics ==
Legend
**Bold**	Career high

Year	Team	Games		Tackles					Interceptions						Fumbles				
Year	Team	GP	GS	Comb	Solo	Ast	Sack	TFL	PD	Int	Yds	Avg	Lng	TD	FF	Fmb	FR	Yds	TD
2020	CLE	Did not play due to injury																	
2021	CLE	15	7	66	43	23	1.0	3	3	1	5	5.0	5	0	1	0	0	0	0
2022	CLE	17	16	105	**72**	33	0.0	4	**10**	**4**	**36**	9.0	**40**	0	0	0	0	0	0
2023	CLE	13	13	80	63	17	1.5	**7**	3	1	0	0.0	0	0	0	**1**	1	**14**	0
2024	CLE	16	16	**111**	68	**43**	1.0	**7**	1	0	0	0.0	0	0	0	0	1	0	0
2025	CLE	17	16	89	48	41	**3.0**	4	4	1	25	**25.0**	25	0	**2**	0	**2**	0	0
2026	CLE	5	5	23	15	8	1.0	1	3	1	0	0	0	0	0	0	0	0	0
Career		83	73	474	309	165	7.5	26	24	8	66	9.4	40	0	3	1	4	14	0
