= Xavier McKinney =

American football player (born 1998)

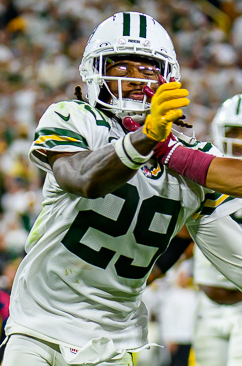
- McKinney with the Green Bay Packers in 2025

No. 29 – Green Bay Packers
- Position: Safety
- Roster status: Active

Personal information
- Born: August 9, 1998 (age 28); Roswell, Georgia, U.S.
- Listed height: 6 ft 0 in (1.83 m)
- Listed weight: 201 lb (91 kg)

Career information
- High school: Roswell
- College: Alabama (2017–2019)
- NFL draft: 2020: 2nd round, 36th overall pick

Career history
- New York Giants (2020–2023); Green Bay Packers (2024–present)

Awards and highlights
- First-team All-Pro (2024); Second-team All-Pro (2025); Pro Bowl (2024); CFP national champion (2017); First-team All-SEC (2019)

Career NFL statistics as of Week 10, 2026
- Total tackles: 518
- Sacks: 4.5
- Forced fumbles: 3
- Fumble recoveries: 3
- Pass deflections: 55
- Interceptions: 25
- Defensive touchdowns: 1
- Stats at Pro Football Reference

Xavier Avis McKinney (born August 9, 1998) is an American professional football safety for the Green Bay Packers of the National Football League (NFL). He played college football for the Alabama Crimson Tide, and was selected by the New York Giants in the second round of the 2020 NFL draft.

== Early life ==
McKinney attended Roswell High School in Roswell, Georgia. As a senior, he recorded 82 tackles and seven interceptions. A 4-star safety recruit, McKinney committed to the University of Alabama to play college football.

== College career ==
As a true freshman at Alabama in 2017, McKinney played in 13 games as a backup and special teams player. As a starter in 2018, he had 73 tackles, two interceptions and three sacks. He was named the defensive MVP of the 2018 Orange Bowl. On January 4, 2020, McKinney announced he would skip his senior season and would declare for the 2020 NFL draft.

== Professional career ==
=== Pre-draft ===
NFL draft analysts projected McKinney as a first or mid second round pick. Lance Zierlein and Daniel Jeremiah from NFL.com ranked him as the top safety in the 2020 NFL Draft and the 18th player overall. Former NFL executive Gil Brandt considered him as the second best safety and the 32nd best overall prospect in the entire draft. NFL draft analysts from Pro Football Focus, Sports Illustrated, and USA Today ranked him as the second best safety prospect in the 2020 NFL Draft.

External videos
- Xavier McKinney runs 4.63s 40-yard dash
- Alabama S Xavier McKinney highlights

Pre-draft measurables
Height	Weight	Arm length	Hand span	Wingspan	40-yard dash	10-yard split	20-yard split	Vertical jump	Broad jump	Bench press	Wonderlic
6 ft 0 3/8 in (1.84 m)	201 lb (91 kg)	30 7/8 in (0.78 m)	8 5/8 in (0.22 m)	6 ft 3 1/2 in (1.92 m)	4.63 s	1.66 s	2.72 s	36.0 in (0.91 m)	10 ft 2 in (3.10 m)	19 reps	11
All values from NFL Combine

=== New York Giants ===
The New York Giants selected McKinney in the second round (36th overall) of the 2020 NFL draft. He was the first safety drafted in 2020.

"We had made up our mind that if Xavier fell to us we were taking him. We did have something if Xavier had been gone we did have a team willing to move up and we would have moved back. But, we felt the value of getting Xavier there was just too good to pass up. We had a first-round value on him, and we’re absolutely thrilled to get him. He’s a great kid. He’s smart, he plays smart, he lines up the back end for us, he’s versatile, you can put him down low, he can cover tight ends, he’s got ball skills, and he’s a good tackler. He certainly is versatile, but one of the important things for us this year was getting a safety that could play the deep part of the field. Xavier has certainly played back there enough that we feel very comfortable about that part of his game.”

— Dave Gettleman (Giants' GM)

External videos
- Giants draft Xavier McKinney No. 36
- Jeremiah: McKinney best safety in draft

==== 2020 season ====
On July 27, 2020, the New York Giants signed McKinney to a four-year, $8.39 million rookie contract that includes $6.02 million guaranteed and an initial signing bonus of $3.22 million. Throughout training camp, McKinney competed against Julian Love to be the starting free safety.

On August 25, 2020, it was reported that McKinney had fractured his foot during practice. The following day, the New York Giants announced that he had undergone surgery after fracturing the fifth metatarsal in his left foot. On September 6, 2020, the New York Giants placed McKinney on injured reserve. He was activated on November 28. He missed the first ten games of the season (Weeks 1–10). On November 23, 2020, the Giants officially listed him as designated to return from injured-reserve.

On November 29, 2020, McKinney made his professional regular season debut and made one solo tackle in a 19–17 victory at the Cincinnati Bengals. In Week 14, he earned his first career start, recording four combined tackles (one solo) during a 7–26 loss to the Arizona Cardinals. On December 27, 2020, McKinney collected a season-high seven solo tackles (8 combined) in the Giants' 13–27 loss at the Baltimore Ravens. On January 3, 2021, McKinney recorded a season-high eight combined tackles (four solo) and made his first career interception off a pass by quarterback Andy Dalton that was intended for tight end Dalton Schultz in the end zone with 1:24 remaining in the fourth quarter, clinching a 23–19 victory against the Dallas Cowboys.

He finished his rookie season with a total of 25 combined tackles (14 solo), one tackle for loss, a pass deflection, and an interception in six games and four starts. The New York Giants finished the 2020 NFL season second in the NFC East with a 6–10 record and did not make the playoffs.

==== 2021 season ====
McKinney entered training camp as a backup safety as Logan Ryan and Jabrill Peppers were entrenched as the starters. Defensive coordinator Patrick Graham listed McKinney as the backup strong safety to begin the season. On October 17, 2021, McKinney made three solo tackles, a season-high two pass deflections, and tied his career-high with two interceptions thrown by Matthew Stafford and John Wolford as the Giants were defeated by the Los Angeles Rams 38–11. On November 3, 2021, the Giants announced that McKinney was in COVID protocol.

On November 7, 2021, McKinney recorded seven combined tackles (four solo), two pass deflections, two interceptions, and a touchdown in a 23–16 victory at the Las Vegas Raiders. During the third quarter, Derek Carr attempted a pass to wide receiver Hunter Renfrow, but it was picked off by McKinney and returned 41+yards to score the first touchdown of his career. His performance against the Las Vegas Raiders earned him NFC Defensive player of the Week. He finished the 2021 NFL season with a total of 93 combined tackles (59 solo), ten pass deflections, five interceptions, and a touchdown while appearing in all 17 games and starting 16.

==== 2022 season ====
On January 11, 2022, the New York Giants announced their decision to fire head coach Joe Judge after they finished the 2021 NFL season with a 4–13 record. He entered training camp projected to be a starter after Logan Ryan and Jabril Peppers both departed during free agency. Defensive coordinator Don Martindale named McKinney the starting free safety to begin the regular season, along with strong safety Julian Love.

In Week 6, McKinney collected nine combined tackles (six solo) during a 24–20 victory against the Baltimore Ravens. During a Giants' Week 9 bye week, McKinney suffered a broken hand in an ATV accident. On November 7, 2022, the New York Giants placed McKinley on the reserve/non-football injury list, which sidelined him for the next seven consecutive games (Weeks 10–16). On December 31, 2022, the New York Giants activated McKinney from the . He finished with 45 combined tackles (29 solo), five pass deflections, one sack, and a forced fumble in nine games and nine starts.

==== 2023 season ====
He entered training camp slated to be the starting free safety. Head coach Brian Daboll named McKinney the starting free safety to begin the season, alongside strong safety Jason Pinnock.

In Week 11, McKinney collected a season-high 13 combined tackles (eight solo) and two pass deflections during a 31–19 victory at the Washington Commanders. On January 7, 2024, he made six combined tackles (two solo), a season-high three pass deflections, and a season-high two interceptions by passes thrown by Marcus Mariota during a 24–10 win against the Philadelphia Eagles. He started a 17 games during the 2023 NFL season and recorded a total of 116 combined tackles (78 solo), 11 pass deflections, three interceptions, two fumble recoveries one forced fumble, and was credited with half a sack. McKinney, along with teammate Bobby Okereke, were the only two defenders in the NFL to not miss a snap the entire season. He received an overall grade of 87.8 from Pro Football Focus in 2023, ranking fourth among all safeties, and also earned a coverage grade of 91.2 from PFF.

=== Green Bay Packers ===
==== 2024 season ====
On March 11, 2024, the Green Bay Packers signed McKinney to a four–year, $67 million contract that includes an initial signing bonus of $23 million. He entered training camp as the 'de facto' starting strong safety under defensive coordinator Jeff Hafley. Head coach Matt LaFleur named him the starting strong safety to kick off the regular season, alongside starting free safety, rookie Javon Bullard.

On September 6, 2024, McKinney made his debut with the Green Bay Packers and recorded four combined tackles (three solo), a pass deflection, and had his first interception with the Packers on a pass thrown by Jalen Hurts to wide receiver DeVonta Smith in the first quarter of a 34–29 loss to the Philadelphia Eagles. The following week, McKinney had four combined tackles (three solo), deflected a pass, and had his second interception thrown by Anthony Richardson, while covering Alec Pierce during the Packers' Week 2 home-opening 16–10 win over the Indianapolis Colts. In Week 3, he continued his interception streak with a third pick off Will Levis, while also amassing five combined tackles (four solo) and a pass deflection during a 30–14 win at the Tennessee Titans. On September 29, 2024, McKinney had his fourth consecutive game with an interception, picking off a pass by Sam Darnold intended for running back Aaron Jones, and also had four combined tackles (one solo) and a pass deflection in a 29–31 loss against the Minnesota Vikings. McKinney became the first Packer in history to record a pick in each of his first four games with the team, and just the fourth in NFL history, joining Ken Lee, Terry Jackson, and Otis Smith. In Week 5, McKinney continued his interception streak, with an interception off of Matthew Stafford thrown to Tutu Atwell, while also making three combined tackles (two solo) and a pass deflection as the Packers won 24–19 at the Los Angeles Rams. He became the first player since 1970 to record five consecutive interceptions in the first five weeks on a new team. In Week 18, McKinney had four combined tackles (three solo), a pass deflection, and had his eighth interception of the season off a pass thrown by wide receiver Keenan Allen to running back D'Andre Swift as the Packers ended the season with a 22–24 loss to the Chicago Bears. He started all 17 games in 2024 and amassed a total of 88 combined tackles (60 solo), 11 pass deflections, a career-high eight interceptions, and a fumble recovery.

In January 2025, McKinney was named to the 2025 Pro Bowl Games and a first-team All-Pro. His eight interceptions were the second most in 2024, behind Detroit Lions' safety Kerby Joseph who finished with nine interceptions. He was ranked 30th by his fellow players on the NFL Top 100 Players of 2025.

==== 2025 season ====
In the 2025 season, McKinney finished with one sack, 107 total tackles (54 solo), two interceptions, and ten passes defended.

== Career statistics ==
Legend
	Led the league
**Bold**	Career high

=== NFL ===
==== Regular season ====
Year	Team	Games		Tackles					Interceptions						Fumbles				
Year	Team	GP	GS	Cmb	Solo	Ast	Sck	TFL	PD	Int	Yds	Avg	Lng	TD	FF	Fmb	FR	Yds	TD
2020	NYG	6	4	25	14	11	0.0	1	1	1	0	0.0	0	0	0	0	0	—	—
2021	NYG	17	16	93	59	34	0.0	1	10	5	64	12.8	41	**1**	0	0	0	—	—
2022	NYG	9	9	45	29	16	**1.0**	**2**	5	0	—	—	—	—	**1**	0	0	—	—
2023	NYG	17	17	**116**	**78**	38	0.5	**2**	**11**	3	22	7.3	18	0	**1**	0	**2**	**7**	0
2024	GB	17	17	88	60	28	**1.0**	**2**	**11**	**8**	**128**	**16.0**	**48**	0	0	**1**	1	**7**	0
2025	GB	16	16	107	54	**53**	**1.0**	0	10	2	0	0.0	0	0	**1**	0	0	—	—
2026	GB	10	10	44	25	19	0.0	2	7	6	46	5.0	36	0	0	0	0	—	—
Career		85	82	486	303	183	3.5	8	49	20	219	11.0	48	1	3	1	3	14	0

==== Postseason ====
Year	Team	Games		Tackles					Interceptions						Fumbles				
Year	Team	GP	GS	Cmb	Solo	Ast	Sck	TFL	PD	Int	Yds	Avg	Lng	TD	FF	Fmb	FR	Yds	TD
2022	NYG	2	2	**16**	**8**	**8**	**1.0**	**1**	**2**	0	—	—	—	—	**1**	0	0	—	—
2024	GB	1	1	5	2	3	0.0	0	0	0	—	—	—	—	0	0	0	—	—
2025	GB	1	1	5	3	2	0.0	0	**2**	0	—	—	—	—	0	0	0	—	—
Career		4	4	26	13	13	1.0	1	4	0	0	0.0	0	0	1	0	0	0	0

=== College ===
Year	Team	GP	Tackles					Interceptions					Fumbles			
Year	Team	GP	Cmb	Solo	Ast	TFL	Sck	Int	Yds	Avg	TD	PD	FF	FR	Yds	TD
2017	Alabama	13	8	5	3	1.5	0.0	0	0	—	0	0	0	0	0	0
2018	Alabama	15	73	44	29	**6.0**	**3.0**	2	23	11.5	**1**	**10**	1	0	0	0
2019	Alabama	13	**95**	**59**	**36**	5.5	**3.0**	**3**	**78**	**26.0**	**1**	5	**4**	**1**	0	0
Career		41	176	108	68	13.0	6.0	5	101	20.2	2	15	5	1	0	0
