= 2018 LSU Tigers football team =

American college football season

2018 LSU Tigers football

Fiesta Bowl champion

Fiesta Bowl, W 40–32 vs. UCF
- Conference: Southeastern Conference
- Western Division

Ranking
- Coaches: No. 7
- AP: No. 6
- Record: 10–3 (5–3 SEC)
- Head coach: Ed Orgeron (2nd season)
- Offensive coordinator: Steve Ensminger (1st season)
- Offensive scheme: Pro spread
- Defensive coordinator: Dave Aranda (3rd season)
- Base defense: 3–4
- Home stadium: Tiger Stadium

Uniform
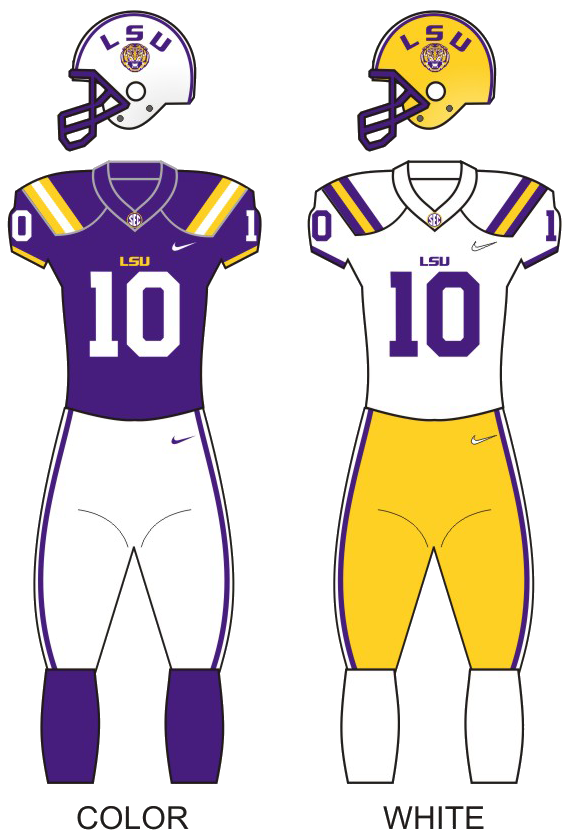

2018 Southeastern Conference football standings
| | Conf. | | | Overall |
| Team | W | | L | W | | L |
|---|---|---|---|---|---|---|
Eastern Division
| No. T–7 Georgia x | 7 | – | 1 | 11 | – | 3 |
| No. 12 Kentucky | 5 | – | 3 | 10 | – | 3 |
| No. T–7 Florida | 5 | – | 3 | 10 | – | 3 |
| South Carolina | 4 | – | 4 | 7 | – | 6 |
| Missouri | 4 | – | 4 | 8 | – | 5 |
| Vanderbilt | 3 | – | 5 | 6 | – | 7 |
| Tennessee | 2 | – | 6 | 5 | – | 7 |
Western Division
| No. 2 Alabama x$^ | 8 | – | 0 | 14 | – | 1 |
| No. 16 Texas A&M | 5 | – | 3 | 9 | – | 4 |
| No. 6 LSU | 5 | – | 3 | 10 | – | 3 |
| Mississippi State* | 4 | – | 4 | 8 | – | 5 |
| Auburn | 3 | – | 5 | 8 | – | 5 |
| Ole Miss | 1 | – | 7 | 5 | – | 7 |
| Arkansas | 0 | – | 8 | 2 | – | 10 |
Championship: Alabama 35, Georgia 28
^ – College Football Playoff participant; $ – Conference champion; x – Division champion/co-champions; * Mississippi State vacated four conference and eight total wins due to NCAA violations.; Rankings from AP Poll

The 2018 LSU Tigers football team represented Louisiana State University during the 2018 NCAA Division I FBS football season. The Tigers played their home games at Tiger Stadium in Baton Rouge, Louisiana and competed in the West Division of the Southeastern Conference (SEC). They were led by second-year head coach Ed Orgeron.

The Tigers, coming off a 9–4 season in Orgeron's first full season, began the year ranked 25th in the preseason AP Poll. In the first game of the year, the team defeated No. 8 Miami (FL) in the Advocare Classic played at AT&T Stadium in Arlington, Texas. LSU won its next four games, including on the road against then-No. 7 Auburn, and rose to fifth in the AP Poll, before falling on the road to Florida. The team rebounded with wins over No. 2 Georgia and No. 22 Mississippi State before being shutout by eventual SEC champions Alabama. In the last game of the regular season, LSU lost on the road against Texas A&M in an FBS record-tying seven overtimes. The final score of the game, 74–72, set the FBS record for combined points in a single game (146). The team finished the regular season tied for second in the SEC's West Division and was invited to the Fiesta Bowl to play UCF, which the Tigers won by a score of 40–32 to end UCF's active win streak of 25 games. LSU finished the season with an overall record of 10–3 and was ranked 6th in the final AP Poll.

The team's defense featured three consensus All-Americans in defensive backs Grant Delpit and Greedy Williams, and linebacker Devin White, who was awarded the Dick Butkus Award as the nation's best linebacker. On offense, the Tigers were led by redshirt junior quarterback Joe Burrow, who finished with 2,894 passing yards and 23 total touchdowns (16 passing and 7 rushing). Senior running back Nick Brossette led the team in rushing with 1,039 yards and 14 touchdowns.

== Recruiting ==
=== Recruits ===
The Tigers signed a total of 22 recruits.

College recruiting (2018)
| Name | Hometown | School | Height | Weight | Commit date |
|---|---|---|---|---|---|
| Damone Clark; LB | Baton Rouge, LA | Southern University Laboratory School | 6 ft 3 in (1.91 m) | 218 lb (99 kg) | Jan 15, 2017 |
| Damone Clark; LB | Recruit ratings: Scout: Rivals: 247Sports: ESPN: | | | | |
| Travez Moore; DE | Bastrop, LA | Copiah–Lincoln Community College | 6 ft 6 in (1.98 m) | 250 lb (110 kg) | Feb 16, 2017 |
| Travez Moore; DE | Recruit ratings: Scout: Rivals: 247Sports: ESPN: | | | | |
| Nelson Jenkins; DT | Plaquemine, LA | Plaquemine High School | 6 ft 3 in (1.91 m) | 290 lb (130 kg) | Feb 16, 2017 |
| Nelson Jenkins; DT | Recruit ratings: Scout: Rivals: 247Sports: ESPN: | | | | |
| Micah Baskerville; LB | Shreveport, LA | Evangel Christian Academy | 6 ft 2 in (1.88 m) | 215 lb (98 kg) | Feb 18, 2017 |
| Micah Baskerville; LB | Recruit ratings: Scout: Rivals: 247Sports: ESPN: | | | | |
| Davin Cotton; DT | Shreveport, LA | Evangel Christian Academy | 6 ft 1 in (1.85 m) | 262 lb (119 kg) | Feb 18, 2017 |
| Davin Cotton; DT | Recruit ratings: Scout: Rivals: 247Sports: ESPN: | | | | |
| Cole Smith; C | Pontotoc, MS | Pontotoc High School | 6 ft 4 in (1.93 m) | 275 lb (125 kg) | Mar 11, 2017 |
| Cole Smith; C | Recruit ratings: Scout: Rivals: 247Sports: ESPN: | | | | |
| Jaray Jenkins; WR | Jena, LA | Jena High School | 6 ft 1 in (1.85 m) | 175 lb (79 kg) | Mar 13, 2017 |
| Jaray Jenkins; WR | Recruit ratings: Scout: Rivals: 247Sports: ESPN: | | | | |
| Chasen Hines; OG | Marshall, TX | Marshall High School | 6 ft 3 in (1.91 m) | 310 lb (140 kg) | Mar 19, 2017 |
| Chasen Hines; OG | Recruit ratings: Scout: Rivals: 247Sports: ESPN: | | | | |
| Jarell Cherry; DE | Dallas, TX | Carter High School | 6 ft 3 in (1.91 m) | 224 lb (102 kg) | Apr 1, 2017 |
| Jarell Cherry; DE | Recruit ratings: Scout: Rivals: 247Sports: ESPN: | | | | |
| Kenan Jones; WR | Berwick, LA | Berwick High School | 6 ft 3 in (1.91 m) | 205 lb (93 kg) | May 13, 2017 |
| Kenan Jones; WR | Recruit ratings: Scout: Rivals: 247Sports: ESPN: | | | | |
| Cameron Wire; OT | Gonzales, LA | East Ascension High School | 6 ft 6 in (1.98 m) | 280 lb (130 kg) | Jun 7, 2017 |
| Cameron Wire; OT | Recruit ratings: Scout: Rivals: 247Sports: ESPN: | | | | |
| Dare Rosenthal; DT | Ferriday, LA | Ferriday High School | 6 ft 7 in (2.01 m) | 327 lb (148 kg) | Jun 17, 2017 |
| Dare Rosenthal; DT | Recruit ratings: Scout: Rivals: 247Sports: ESPN: | | | | |
| Dantrieze Scott; DE | Ferriday, LA | Ferriday High School | 6 ft 5 in (1.96 m) | 245 lb (111 kg) | Jun 17, 2017 |
| Dantrieze Scott; DE | Recruit ratings: Scout: Rivals: 247Sports: ESPN: | | | | |
| Chris Curry; RB | Lehigh Acres, FL | Lehigh High School | 5 ft 11 in (1.80 m) | 200 lb (91 kg) | Jun 22, 2017 |
| Chris Curry; RB | Recruit ratings: Scout: Rivals: 247Sports: ESPN: | | | | |
| Tae Provens; RB | Gurley, AL | Madison County High School | 5 ft 11 in (1.80 m) | 187 lb (85 kg) | Jun 24, 2017 |
| Tae Provens; RB | Recruit ratings: Scout: Rivals: 247Sports: ESPN: | | | | |
| Zach Sheffer; TE | Ponte Vedra Beach, FL | Nease High School | 6 ft 3 in (1.91 m) | 230 lb (100 kg) | Jun 25, 2017 |
| Zach Sheffer; TE | Recruit ratings: Scout: Rivals: 247Sports: ESPN: | | | | |
| Damien Lewis; OG | Canton, MS | Northwest Mississippi Community College | 6 ft 3 in (1.91 m) | 320 lb (150 kg) | Nov 26, 2017 |
| Damien Lewis; OG | Recruit ratings: Scout: Rivals: 247Sports: ESPN: | | | | |
| Badara Traore; OT | Hyde Park, MA | ASA College | 6 ft 7 in (2.01 m) | 310 lb (140 kg) | Dec 7, 2017 |
| Badara Traore; OT | Recruit ratings: Scout: Rivals: 247Sports: ESPN: | | | | |
| Dominic Livingston; DT | Aldine, TX | Davis High School | 6 ft 3 in (1.91 m) | 340 lb (150 kg) | Dec 8, 2017 |
| Dominic Livingston; DT | Recruit ratings: Scout: Rivals: 247Sports: ESPN: | | | | |
| Terrace Marshall Jr. WR | Bossier City, LA | Parkway High School | 6 ft 4 in (1.93 m) | 186 lb (84 kg) | Dec 22, 2017 |
| Terrace Marshall Jr. WR | Recruit ratings: Scout: Rivals: 247Sports: ESPN: | | | | |
| Kelvin Joseph; S | Baton Rouge, LA | Scotlandville Magnet High School | 6 ft 0 in (1.83 m) | 185 lb (84 kg) | Jan 6, 2018 |
| Kelvin Joseph; S | Recruit ratings: Scout: Rivals: 247Sports: ESPN: | | | | |
| Ja'Marr Chase; WR | Metairie, LA | Archbishop Rummel High School | 6 ft 1 in (1.85 m) | 195 lb (88 kg) | Feb 7, 2018 |
| Ja'Marr Chase; WR | Recruit ratings: Scout: Rivals: 247Sports: ESPN: | | | | |
Overall recruit ranking: Rivals: 14 247Sports: 11 ESPN: 14
Note: In many cases, Scout, Rivals, 247Sports, On3, and ESPN may conflict in their listings of height and weight.; In these cases, the average was taken. ESPN grades are on a 100-point scale.; Sources: "LSU Football Commitments". Rivals.; "2018 Team Ranking". Rivals.com.

== Preseason ==
=== Award watch lists ===
Listed in the order that they were released

| Award | Player | Position | Year |
|---|---|---|---|
| Lott Trophy | Devin White | LB | JR |
| Chuck Bednarik Award | Devin White | LB | JR |
| Chuck Bednarik Award | Greedy Williams | CB | SO |
| Fred Biletnikoff Award | Jonathan Giles | WR | JR |
| John Mackey Award | Foster Moreau | TE | SR |
| Butkus Award | Devin White | LB | JR |
| Jim Thorpe Award | Greedy Williams | CB | SO |
| Wuerffel Trophy | Blake Ferguson | LS | JR |
| Walter Camp Award | Greedy Williams | CB | SO |

=== SEC media poll ===
The SEC media poll was released on July 20, 2018 with the Tigers selected to finish in fifth place in the West Division.

=== Preseason All-SEC teams ===
The Tigers had five players selected to the preseason all-SEC teams.

Offense

2nd team

Garrett Brumfield – OL

Defense

1st team

Devin White – LB

Greedy Williams – DB

3rd team

Rashard Lawrence – DL

Specialists

Zach Von Rosenberg – P

== Schedule ==
| Date | Time | Opponent | Rank | Site | TV | Result | Attendance |
|---|---|---|---|---|---|---|---|
| September 2 | 6:30 p.m. | vs. No. 8 Miami (FL)* | No. 25 | AT&T Stadium; Arlington, TX (Advocare Classic) | ABC | W 33–17 | 68,841 |
| September 8 | 6:00 p.m. | Southeastern Louisiana* | No. 11 | Tiger Stadium; Baton Rouge, LA | ESPN2 | W 31–0 | 96,883 |
| September 15 | 2:30 p.m. | at No. 7 Auburn | No. 12 | Jordan–Hare Stadium; Auburn, AL (Tiger Bowl) | CBS | W 22–21 | 86,787 |
| September 22 | 6:00 p.m. | Louisiana Tech* | No. 6 | Tiger Stadium; Baton Rouge, LA | ESPNU | W 38–21 | 102,321 |
| September 29 | 8:00 p.m. | Ole Miss | No. 5 | Tiger Stadium; Baton Rouge, LA (Magnolia Bowl) | ESPN | W 45–16 | 100,224 |
| October 6 | 2:30 p.m. | at No. 22 Florida | No. 5 | Ben Hill Griffin Stadium; Gainesville, FL (rivalry / SEC Nation) | CBS | L 19–27 | 90,283 |
| October 13 | 2:30 p.m. | No. 2 Georgia | No. 13 | Tiger Stadium; Baton Rouge, LA | CBS | W 36–16 | 102,321 |
| October 20 | 6:00 p.m. | No. 22 Mississippi State | No. 5 | Tiger Stadium; Baton Rouge, LA (rivalry) | ESPN | W 19–3 | 101,340 |
| November 3 | 7:00 p.m. | No. 1 Alabama | No. 3 | Tiger Stadium; Baton Rouge, LA (rivalry) (College GameDay) | CBS | L 0–29 | 102,321 |
| November 10 | 6:30 p.m. | at Arkansas | No. 7 | Donald W. Reynolds Razorback Stadium; Fayetteville, AR (rivalry / SEC Nation) | SECN | W 24–17 | 64,135 |
| November 17 | 6:30 p.m. | Rice* | No. 7 | Tiger Stadium; Baton Rouge, LA | ESPNU | W 42–10 | 100,323 |
| November 24 | 6:30 p.m. | at No. 22 Texas A&M | No. 7 | Kyle Field; College Station, TX (rivalry) | SECN | L 72–74 ^{7OT} | 101,501 |
| January 1, 2019 | 12:00 p.m. | vs. No. 8 UCF* | No. 11 | State Farm Stadium; Glendale, AZ (Fiesta Bowl) | ESPN | W 40–32 | 57,246 |
*Non-conference game; Rankings from AP Poll and CFP Rankings after October 30 released prior to game; All times are in Central time

== Roster ==
2018 LSU Tigers football team roster
Players
Coaches
Offense

| Pos. | # | Name | Class |
|---|---|---|---|
| WR | 1 | Ja'Marr Chase | Fr |
| WR | 2 | Justin Jefferson | So |
| QB | 3 | A. J. Aycock | Fr |
| RB | 4 | Nick Brossette | Sr |
| QB | 5 | Alex Aucoin | Fr |
| WR | 6 | Terrace Marshall Jr. | Fr |
| QB | 8 | Jordan Loving | Fr |
| QB | 9 | Joe Burrow | Jr |
| WR | 10 | Stephen Sullivan | Jr |
| WR | 11 | Dee Anderson | Jr |
| WR | 12 | Jonathan Giles | Jr |
| QB | 13 | Andre Sale | So |
| RB | 14 | Justin Jones | So |
| QB | 15 | Myles Brennan | So |
| QB | 16 | Tiger Scheyd | Sr |
| TE | 17 | Racey McMath | So |
| TE | 18 | Foster Moreau | Sr |
| WR | 19 | Derrick Dillon | Jr |
| RB | 22 | Clyde Edwards-Helaire | So |
| RB | 24 | Chris Curry | Fr |
| RB | 25 | Tae Provens | Fr |
| RB | 27 | Lanard Fournette | Jr |
| WR | 28 | Danny Bushland | Fr |
| WR | 30 | Michael Ostrom | Sr |
| TE | 34 | Zach Sheffer | Fr |
| WR | 38 | Keith Fulton | So |
| TE | 41 | David Ducre | Sr |
| TE | 41 | Carlton Smith | Fr |
| TE | 42 | Aaron Moffitt | Fr |
| FB | 43 | Matt Brock | Jr |
| FB | 44 | Tory Carter | So |
| TE | 45 | Stephen King | Fr |
| FB | 47 | Trey Gallman | Sr |
| TE | 49 | Jansen Mayea | Fr |
| OL | 51 | Dare Rosenthal | Fr |
| OL | 54 | Rory Luke | Jr |
| OL | 57 | Chasen Hines | Fr |
| OL | 61 | Cameron Wire | Fr |
| OL | 62 | Justin Mikush | Sr |
| OL | 65 | Jakori Savage | So |
| OL | 67 | Cole Smith | Fr |
| OL | 68 | Damien Lewis | Jr |
| OL | 69 | Turner Simmers | Sr |
| OL | 70 | Ed Ingram | So |
| OL | 71 | Donovaughn Campbell | So |
| OL | 73 | Adrian Magee | Jr |
| OL | 74 | Badara Traore | Jr |
| OL | 75 | Michael Smith | So |
| OL | 76 | Austin Deculus | So |
| OL | 77 | Saahdiq Charles | So |
| OL | 78 | Garrett Brumfield | Sr |
| OL | 79 | Lloyd Cushenberry | So |
| TE | 80 | Jamal Pettigrew | So |
| TE | 81 | Thaddeus Moss | So |
| WR | 82 | Kenan Jones | Fr |
| WR | 83 | Jaray Jenkins | Fr |
| WR | 85 | Michael Martin | Fr |
| WR | 87 | Wesley McKoy | Jr |
| TE | 88 | Jacory Washington | Sr |
| WR | 89 | Colby Brunet | So |

Defense

| Pos. | # | Name | Class |
|---|---|---|---|
| DB | 1 | Kelvin Joseph | Fr |
| DB | 3 | JaCoby Stevens | So |
| LB | 4 | K'Lavon Chaisson | So |
| DB | 5 | Kary Vincent Jr. | So |
| LB | 6 | Jacob Phillips | So |
| LB | 8 | Patrick Queen | So |
| DB | 9 | Grant Delpit | So |
| DB | 11 | Terrence Alexander | Sr |
| DB | 13 | Jontre Kirklin | So |
| DB | 14 | Ja'Vaughn Narcisse | Fr |
| DB | 17 | Jabari Murray | Fr |
| DB | 21 | Ed Paris | Sr |
| DB | 22 | Kristian Fulton | Jr |
| LB | 23 | Micah Baskerville | Fr |
| LB | 24 | Tyler Taylor | So |
| DB | 25 | Jonathan Baker | Jr |
| DB | 26 | John Battle | Sr |
| DB | 27 | Treven Kately | Fr |
| DB | 28 | Mannie Netherly | So |
| DB | 29 | Greedy Williams | So |
| DB | 30 | Eric Monroe | So |
| DB | 31 | Cameron Lewis | So |
| DB | 32 | Amire Loftis | Jr |
| DB | 33 | Todd Harris Jr. | So |
| LB | 35 | Damone Clark | Fr |
| DB | 39 | Lloyd Cole | Jr |
| LB | 40 | Devin White | Jr |
| LB | 42 | Hunter Faust | Fr |
| LB | 43 | Ray Thornton | So |
| LB | 45 | Michael Divinity | Jr |
| LB | 46 | Andre Anthony | So |
| DL | 47 | Nelson Jenkins III | Fr |
| LB | 48 | Dantrieze Scott | Fr |
| DL | 49 | Travez Moore | Jr |
| LB | 52 | Kody Hall | Jr |
| LB | 53 | Cameron Prudhomme | Fr |
| DL | 54 | Davin Cotton | Fr |
| LB | 55 | Jarell Cherry | Fr |
| LB | 58 | Jared Small | Fr |
| DL | 59 | Seth Newsome | So |
| DL | 72 | Tyler Shelvin | Fr |
| DL | 90 | Rashard Lawrence | Jr |
| DL | 91 | Breiden Fehoko | Jr |
| DL | 92 | Neil Farrell Jr. | So |
| DL | 93 | Justin Thomas | So |
| DL | 95 | Ed Alexander | So |
| DL | 96 | Glen Logan | So |
| DL | 98 | Dominic Livingston | Fr |
| DL | 99 | Ed Alexander | Jr |

Special teams

| Pos. | # | Name | Class |
|---|---|---|---|
| K | 32 | Avery Atkins | Fr |
| K | 34 | Connor Culp | So |
| K | 36 | Cole Tracy | Sr |
| P | 38 | Josh Growden | Jr |
| K | 39 | Jack Gonsoulin | Jr |
| P | 46 | Zach Von Rosenberg | So |
| LS | 48 | Blake Ferguson | Jr |
| LS | 53 | Will Cox | Fr |

Head coach

- Ed Orgeron

Coordinators/assistant coaches

- Steve Ensminger – Offensive coordinator/tight ends
- Dave Aranda – Associate head coach/defensive coordinator
- Greg McMahon – Special Teams Coordinator
- Tommie Robinson – Assistant head coach/running backs/recruiting coordinator
- Jerry Sullivan – Offensive assistant/passing game coordinator
- Mickey Joseph – Wide receivers
- James Cregg – Offensive line
- Dennis Johnson – Defensive line
- Corey Raymond – Defensive backs
- Bill Busch – Safeties
- Tommy Moffitt – Assistant athletic director/strength and conditioning
- Dr. Sam Nader – Assistant Athletic Director – Football
- Sharon Lewis – Assistant athletic director/football recruiting and alumni relations
- Kevin Faulk – Director, Player Development
- Derek Ponamsky – Special assistant to the head coach
- Brad Kragthorpe - Offensive analyst

Legend

- (C) Team captain
- (S) Suspended
- (I) Ineligible
- Injured
- Redshirt

Roster
Last update: 10/26/18

== Game summaries ==
=== vs Miami (FL) ===
LSU vs. Miami (FL) – Game summary

| Quarter | 1 | 2 | 3 | 4 | Total |
|---|---|---|---|---|---|
| No. 8 Hurricanes | 3 | 0 | 0 | 14 | 17 |
| No. 25 Tigers | 10 | 17 | 6 | 0 | 33 |

at AT&T Stadium, Arlington, TX

- Date: September 2
- Game time: 6:30 p.m. CST
- Game weather: 72 °F (22 °C); N/A (Indoors)
- Game attendance: 68,841
- Referee: Mike Defee
- TV: ABC

Game information

First quarter

- LSU – Cole Tracy 43-yard field goal, 8:26 (LSU 3–0)
- MIA – Bubba Baxa 38-yard field goal, 6:49 (TIE 3–3)
- LSU – Nick Brossette 50-yard TD run, Tracy kick good, 0:35 (LSU 10–3)

Second quarter

- LSU – Brossette 1-yard TD run, Tracy kick good, 9:21 (LSU 17–3)
- LSU – Tracy 21-yard field goal, 4:56 (LSU 20–3)
- LSU – Jacob Phillips 45-yard interception returned for TD, Tracy kick good, 4:21 (LSU 27–3)

Third quarter

- LSU – Tracy 21-yard field goal, 7:32 (LSU 30–3)
- LSU – Tracy 54-yard field goal, 3:51 (LSU 33–3)

Fourth quarter

- MIA – Malik Rosier 3-yard TD run, Baxa kick good, 13:57 (LSU 33–10)
- MIA – Brian Hightower 32-yard TD pass from Rosier, Baxa kick good, 8:43 (LSU 33–17)

Top passers

- LSU – Joe Burrow – 11/24, 140 yards
- MIA – Malik Rosier – 15/35, 259 yards, TD, 2 INT

Top rushers

- LSU – Nick Brossette – 22 carries, 125 yards, 2 TD
- MIA – DeeJay Dallas – 8 carries, 38 yards

Top receivers

- LSU – Justin Jefferson – 5 receptions, 81 yards
- MIA – Jeff Thomas – 5 receptions, 132 yards

=== Southeastern Louisiana ===
Southeastern Louisiana at LSU – Game summary

| Quarter | 1 | 2 | 3 | 4 | Total |
|---|---|---|---|---|---|
| Lions | 0 | 0 | 0 | 0 | 0 |
| No. 11 Tigers | 14 | 10 | 0 | 7 | 31 |

at Tiger Stadium, Baton Rouge, LA

- Date: September 8
- Game time: 6:00 p.m. CST
- Game weather: 90 °F (32 °C); fair
- Game attendance: 96,883
- Referee: James Carter
- TV: ESPN2

Game information

First quarter

- LSU – Ja'Marr Chase 9-yard TD pass from Joe Burrow, Cole Tracy kick good, 7:15 (LSU 7–0)
- LSU – Burrow 1-yard TD run, Tracy kick good, 3:20 (LSU 14–0)

Second quarter

- LSU – Tracy 50-yard field goal, 11:21 (LSU 17–0)
- LSU – Stephen Sullivan 40-yard TD pass from Burrow, Tracy kick good, 0:00 (LSU 24–0)

Fourth quarter

- LSU – Clyde Edwards-Helaire 7-yard TD run, Tracy kick good, 2:03 (LSU 31–0)

Top passers

- LSU – Joe Burrow – 10/20, 151 yards, 2 TD
- SELA – Chason Virgil – 23/33, 189 yards, INT

Top rushers

- LSU – Nick Brossette – 19 carries, 137 yards
- SELA – Lorenzo Lee Nunez – 11 carries, 64 yards

Top receivers

- LSU – Stephen Sullivan – 2 receptions, 54 yards, TD
- SELA – Juwan Petit-Frere – 5 receptions, 60 yards

=== At Auburn ===
LSU at Auburn – Game summary

| Quarter | 1 | 2 | 3 | 4 | Total |
|---|---|---|---|---|---|
| No. 11 LSU Tigers | 7 | 3 | 3 | 9 | 22 |
| No. 7 AUB Tigers | 0 | 14 | 7 | 0 | 21 |

at Jordan-Hare Stadium, Auburn, AL

- Date: September 15
- Game time: 2:30 p.m. CST
- Game weather: Temperature: 93 °F (34 °C)• Wind: N 10 mph • Weather: Partly Cloudy
- Game attendance: 86,787
- Referee: John McDaid
- TV announcers (CBS): Brad Nessler (play-by-play), Gary Danielson (analyst), Jamie Erdahl (sideline reporter)

Game information

First quarter

- LSU – Clyde Edwards-Helaire 1-yard TD run, Cole Tracy kick good, 9:59 (LSU 7–0)

Second quarter

- LSU – Tracy 33-yard field goal, 8:37 (LSU 10–0)
- AUB – JaTarvious Whitlow 7-yard TD run, Anders Carlson kick good, 5:06 (LSU 10–7)
- AUB – Shawn Shivers 7-yard TD run, Carlson kick good, 1:31 (AUB 14–10)

Third quarter

- AUB – Darius Slayton 4-yard TD pass from Jarrett Stidham, Carlson kick good, 10:38 (AUB 21–10)
- LSU – Tracy 27-yard field goal, 3:58 (AUB 21–13)

Fourth quarter

- LSU – Derrick Dillon 71-yard TD pass from Joe Burrow, two-point pass conversion attempt no good, 8:18 (AUB 21–19)
- LSU – Tracy 42-yard field goal, 0:00 (LSU 22–21)

Top passers

- LSU – Joe Burrow – 15/34, 249 yards, TD
- AUB – Jarrett Stidham – 16/28, 198 yards, TD, 2 INT

Top rushers

- LSU – Nick Brossette – 19 carries, 69 yards
- AUB – JaTarvious Whitlow – 22 carries, 104 yards, TD

Top receivers

- LSU – Justin Jefferson – 5 receptions, 97 yards
- AUB – Anthony Schwartz – 2 receptions, 37 yards

=== Louisiana Tech ===
Louisiana Tech at LSU – Game summary

| Quarter | 1 | 2 | 3 | 4 | Total |
|---|---|---|---|---|---|
| Bulldogs | 0 | 7 | 7 | 7 | 21 |
| No. 6 Tigers | 7 | 17 | 0 | 14 | 38 |

at Tiger Stadium, Baton Rouge, LA

- Date: September 22
- Game time: 6:00 p.m. CST
- Game weather: 78 °F (26 °C); light rain
- Game attendance: 102,321
- Referee: David Smith
- TV: ESPNU

Game information

First quarter

- LSU – Nick Brossette 1-yard TD run, Cole Tracy kick good, 9:20 (LSU 7–0)

Second quarter

- LSU – Brossette 1-yard TD run, Tracy kick good, 14:57 (LSU 14–0)
- LSU – Tracy 24-yard field goal, 9:17 (LSU 17–0)
- LSU – Clyde Edwards-Helaire 28-yard TD run, Tracy kick good, 8:22 (LSU 24–0)
- LT – Adrian Hardy 20-yard TD pass from J'Mar Smith, Bailey Hale kick good, 4:23 (LSU 24–7)

Third quarter

- LT – Bobby Holly 1-yard TD pass from Smith, Hale kick good, 9:10 (LSU 24–14)

Fourth quarter

- LT – Hardy 42-yard TD pass from Smith, Hale kick good, 12:57 (LSU 24–21)
- LSU – Brossette 2-yard TD run, Tracy kick good, 8:06 (LSU 31–21)
- LSU – Edwards-Helaire 1-yard TD run, Tracy kick good, 2:23 (LSU 38–21)

Top passers

- LSU – Joe Burrow – 16/28, 191 yards
- LT – J'Mar Smith – 27/50, 330 yards, 3 TD, INT

Top rushers

- LSU – Clyde Edwards-Helaire – 20 carries, 136 yards, 2 TD
- LT – Jaqwis Dancy – 7 carries, 31 yards

Top receivers

- LSU – Dee Anderson – 5 receptions, 80 yards
- LT – Adrian Hardy – 10 receptions, 181 yards, 2 TD

=== Ole Miss ===
Ole Miss at LSU – Game summary

| Quarter | 1 | 2 | 3 | 4 | Total |
|---|---|---|---|---|---|
| Rebels | 3 | 3 | 7 | 3 | 16 |
| No. 5 Tigers | 14 | 14 | 7 | 10 | 45 |

at Tiger Stadium, Baton Rouge, LA

- Date: September 29
- Game time: 8:00 p.m. CST
- Game weather: 77 °F (25 °C); cloudy
- Game attendance: 100,224
- Referee: Ken Williamson
- TV: ESPN

Game information

First quarter

- MISS – Luke Logan 30-yard field goal, 9:06 (MISS 3–0)
- LSU – Ja'Marr Chase 21-yard TD pass from Joe Burrow, Cole Tracy kick good, 5:59 (LSU 7–3)
- LSU – Nick Brossette 4-yard TD run, Tracy kick good, 0:57 (LSU 14–3)

Second quarter

- LSU – Clyde Edwards-Helaire 3-yard TD run, Tracy kick good, 8:59 (LSU 21–3)
- LSU – Justin Jefferson 65-yard TD pass from Burrow, Tracy kick good, 7:41 (LSU 28–3)
- MISS – Logan 17-yard field goal, 0:03 (LSU 28–6)

Third quarter

- MISS – Scottie Phillips 1-yard TD run, Logan kick good, 3:45 (LSU 28–13)
- LSU – Jefferson 5-yard TD pass from Burrow, Tracy kick good, 1:48 (LSU 35–13)

Fourth quarter

- MISS – Logan 40-yard field goal, 13:10 (LSU 35–16)
- LSU – Tracy 26-yard field goal, 8:45 (LSU 38–16)
- LSU – Burrow 35-yard TD run, Tracy kick good, 2:56 (LSU 45–16)

Top passers

- LSU – Joe Burrow – 18/25, 292 yards, 3 TD
- MISS – Jordan Ta'amu – 19/38, 178 yards, INT

Top rushers

- LSU – Joe Burrow – 9 carries, 96 yards, TD
- MISS – Scottie Phillips – 16 carries, 96 yards, TD

Top receivers

- LSU – Justin Jefferson – 5 receptions, 99 yards, 2 TD
- MISS – A. J. Brown – 9 receptions, 72 yards

=== At Florida ===
LSU at Florida – Game summary

| Quarter | 1 | 2 | 3 | 4 | Total |
|---|---|---|---|---|---|
| No. 5 Tigers | 7 | 3 | 3 | 6 | 19 |
| No. 22 Gators | 0 | 14 | 0 | 13 | 27 |

at Ben Hill Griffin Stadium, Gainesville, FL

- Date: October 6
- Game time: 3:30 p.m. CST
- Game weather: 88 °F (31 °C); sunny and humid
- Game attendance: 90,283
- Referee: Matt Loeffler
- TV: CBS

Game information

First quarter

- LSU – Nick Brossette 4-yard TD run, Cole Tracy kick good, 11:43 (LSU 7–0)

Second quarter

- FLA – La'Mical Perine 1-yard TD run, Evan McPherson kick good, 12:30 (TIE 7–7)
- LSU – Tracy 33-yard field goal, 3:10 (LSU 10–7)
- FLA – Moral Stephens 3-yard TD pass from Feleipe Franks, McPherson kick good, 1:09 (FLA 14–10)

Third quarter

- LSU – Tracy 42-yard field goal, 4:16 (FLA 14–13)

Fourth quarter

- LSU – Brossette 1-yard TD run, two-point conversion pass attempt no good, 11:14 (LSU 19–14)
- FLA – Perine 2-yard TD run, two-point conversion pass attempt no good, 8:48 (FLA 20–19)
- FLA – Brad Stewart Jr. 25-yard interception returned for TD, McPherson kick good, 1:45 (FLA 27–19)

Top passers

- FLA – Feleipe Franks – 12/27, 161 yards, TD, INT
- LSU – Joe Burrow – 19/34, 192 yards, 2 INT

Top rushers

- FLA – La'Mical Perine – 17 carries, 85 yards, 2 TD
- LSU – Nick Brossette – 15 carries, 95 yards, 2 TD

Top receivers

- FLA – Josh Hammond – 3 receptions, 85 yards
- LSU – Justin Jefferson – 3 receptions, 51 yards

=== Georgia ===
Georgia Bulldogs offensive lineman Isaiah Wilson (79), LSU Tigers safety Grant Delpit (9), and LSU Tigers defensive end Rashard Lawrence (90) coming over the top on October 13, 2018

Georgia at LSU – Game summary

| Quarter | 1 | 2 | 3 | 4 | Total |
|---|---|---|---|---|---|
| No. 2 Bulldogs | 0 | 0 | 9 | 7 | 16 |
| No. 13 Tigers | 3 | 13 | 3 | 17 | 36 |

at Tiger Stadium, Baton Rouge, LA

- Date: October 13
- Game time: 2:30 p.m. CST
- Game weather: 86 °F (30 °C); sunny
- Game attendance: 102,321
- Referee: James Carter
- TV: CBS

Game information

First quarter

- LSU – Cole Tracy 33-yard field goal, 9:32 (LSU 3–0)

Second quarter

- LSU – Joe Burrow 1-yard TD run, Tracy kick good, 13:34 (LSU 10–0)
- LSU – Tracy 36-yard field goal, 11:22 (LSU 13–0)
- LSU – Tracy 39-yard field goal, 5:09 (LSU 16–0)

Third quarter

- UGA – Rodrigo Blankenship 40-yard field goal, 9:03 (LSU 16–3)
- LSU – Tracy 24-yard field goal, 3:00 (LSU 19–3)
- UGA – Elijah Holyfield 10-yard TD run, two-point conversion run attempt no good, 0:07 (LSU 19–9)

Fourth quarter

- LSU – Burrow 1-yard TD run, Tracy kick good, 9:31 (LSU 26–9)
- LSU – Tracy 30-yard field goal, 7:20 (LSU 29–9)
- UGA – Riley Ridley 27-yard TD pass from Jake Fromm, Blankenship kick good, 6:00 (LSU 29–16)
- LSU – Nick Brossette 4-yard TD run, Tracy kick good, 4:14 (LSU 36–16)

Top passers

- LSU – Joe Burrow – 15/30, 200 yards
- UGA – Jake Fromm – 16/34, 209 yards, TD, 2 INT

Top rushers

- LSU – Clyde Edwards-Helaire – 19 carries, 145 yards
- UGA – D'Andre Swift – 12 carries, 72 yards

Top receivers

- LSU – Justin Jefferson – 6 receptions, 108 yards
- UGA – Riley Ridley – 3 receptions, 75 yards, TD

=== Mississippi State ===
Mississippi State at LSU – Game summary

| Quarter | 1 | 2 | 3 | 4 | Total |
|---|---|---|---|---|---|
| No. 22 Bulldogs | 3 | 0 | 0 | 0 | 3 |
| No. 5 Tigers | 7 | 3 | 6 | 3 | 19 |

at Tiger Stadium, Baton Rouge, LA

- Date: October 20
- Game time: 6:00 p.m. CST
- Game weather: 77 °F (25 °C); cloudy w/ light rain
- Game attendance: 101,340
- Referee: John McDaid
- TV: ESPN

Game information

First quarter

- LSU – Nick Brossette 1-yard TD run, Cole Tracy kick good, 12:37 (LSU 7–0)
- MSST – Jace Christmann 19-yard field goal, 8:43 (LSU 7–3)

Second quarter

- LSU – Tracy 25-yard field goal, 0:00 (LSU 10–3)

Third quarter

- LSU – Tracy 38-yard field goal, 10:44 (LSU 13–3)
- LSU – Tracy 29-yard field goal, 2:54 (LSU 16–3)

Fourth quarter

- LSU – Tracy 40-yard field goal, 10:42 (LSU 19–3)

Top passers

- LSU – Joe Burrow – 16/28, 129 yards, INT
- MSST – Nick Fitzgerald – 8/24, 59 yards, 4 INT

Top rushers

- LSU – Nick Brossette – 17 carries, 57 yards, TD
- MSST – Nick Fitzgerald – 23 carries, 131 yards

Top receivers

- LSU – Dee Anderson – 3 receptions, 29 yards
- MSST – Deddrick Thomas – reception, 15 yards

=== Alabama ===
Alabama at LSU – Game summary

| Quarter | 1 | 2 | 3 | 4 | Total |
|---|---|---|---|---|---|
| No. 1 Crimson Tide | 6 | 10 | 6 | 7 | 29 |
| No. 4 Tigers | 0 | 0 | 0 | 0 | 0 |

at Tiger Stadium, Baton Rouge, LA

- Date: November 3
- Game time: 7:00 p.m. CST
- Game weather: 65 °F (18 °C); clear
- Game attendance: 102,321
- Referee: Matt Austin
- TV: CBS

Game information

First quarter

- BAMA – Henry Ruggs 15-yard TD pass from Tua Tagovailoa, Joseph Bulovas kick no good, 4:58 (BAMA 6–0)

Second quarter

- BAMA – Bulovas 23-yard field goal, 6:59 (BAMA 9–0)
- BAMA – Irv Smith Jr. 25-yard TD pass from Tagovailoa, Bulovas kick good, 1:15 (BAMA 16–0)

Third quarter

- BAMA – Tagovailoa 44-yard TD run, Bulovas kick no good, 5:14 (BAMA 22–0)

Fourth quarter

- BAMA – Damien Harris 1-yard TD run, Bulovas kick good, 5:42 (BAMA 29–0)

Top passers

- BAMA – Tua Tagovailoa – 25/42, 295 yards, 2 TD, INT
- LSU – Joe Burrow – 18/35, 184 yards, INT

Top rushers

- BAMA – Damien Harris – 19 carries, 107 yards, TD
- LSU – Clyde Edwards-Helaire – 6 carries, 14 yards

Top receivers

- BAMA – Jerry Jeudy – 8 receptions, 103 yards
- LSU – Justin Jefferson – 6 receptions, 81 yards

=== At Arkansas ===
LSU at Arkansas – Game summary

| Quarter | 1 | 2 | 3 | 4 | Total |
|---|---|---|---|---|---|
| No. 9 Tigers | 7 | 7 | 10 | 0 | 24 |
| Razorbacks | 0 | 3 | 0 | 14 | 17 |

at Donald W. Reynolds Razorback Stadium, Fayetteville, AR

- Date: November 10
- Game time: 6:30 p.m. CST
- Game weather: 38 °F (3 °C); clear
- Game attendance: 64,135
- Referee: Lee Hedrick
- TV: SEC Network

Game information

First quarter

- LSU – Justin Jefferson 40-yard TD pass from Joe Burrow, Cole Tracy kick good, 7:30 (LSU 7–0)

Second quarter

- LSU – Nick Brossette 12-yard TD run, Tracy kick good, 5:24 (LSU 14–0)
- ARK – Connor Limpert 24-yard field goal, 0:00 (LSU 14–3)

Third quarter

- LSU – Clyde Edwards-Helaire 13-yard TD run, Tracy kick good, 9:44 (LSU 21–3)
- LSU – Tracy 40-yard field goal, 3:12 (LSU 24–3)

Fourth quarter

- ARK – Cheyenne O'Grady 11-yard TD pass from Ty Storey, Limpert kick good, 12:37 (LSU 24–10)
- ARK – O'Grady 32-yard TD pass from Storey, Limpert kick good, 5:27 (LSU 24–17)

Top passers

- LSU – Joe Burrow – 15/21, 195 yards, TD
- ARK – Ty Storey – 19/38, 200 yards, 2 TD, INT

Top rushers

- LSU – Nick Brossette – 23 carries, 90 yards, TD
- ARK – Rakeem Boyd – 10 carries, 30 yards

Top receivers

- LSU – Justin Jefferson – 6 receptions, 117 yards, TD
- ARK – Cheyenne O'Grady – 6 receptions, 75 yards, 2 TD

=== Rice ===
Rice at LSU – Game summary

| Quarter | 1 | 2 | 3 | 4 | Total |
|---|---|---|---|---|---|
| Owls | 0 | 3 | 0 | 7 | 10 |
| No. 10 Tigers | 14 | 14 | 7 | 7 | 42 |

at Tiger Stadium, Baton Rouge, LA

- Date: November 17
- Game time: 6:30 p.m. CST
- Game weather: 52 °F (11 °C); clear
- Game attendance: 100,323
- Referee: Marc Curles
- TV: ESPNU

Game information

First quarter

- LSU – Clyde Edwards-Helaire 3-yard TD run, Cole Tracy kick good, 11:06 (LSU 7–0)
- LSU – Stephen Sullivan 38-yard TD pass from Joe Burrow, Tracy kick good, 5:52 (LSU 14–0)

Second quarter

- LSU – Nick Brossette 2-yard TD run, Tracy kick good, 13:06 (LSU 21–0)
- LSU – Foster Moreau 13-yard TD pass from Burrow, Tracy kick good, 8:01 (LSU 28–0)
- RICE – Haden Tobola 51-yard field goal, 1:55 (LSU 28–3)

Third quarter

- LSU – Brossette 2-yard TD run, Tracy kick good, 9:32 (LSU 35–3)

Fourth quarter

- LSU – Lanard Fournette 3-yard TD run, Tracy kick good, 11:00 (LSU 42–3)
- RICE – Juma Otoviano 5-yard TD run, Jack Fox kick good, 2:55 (LSU 42–10)

Top passers

- LSU – Joe Burrow – 20/28, 307 yards, 2 TD
- RICE – Shawn Stankavage – 7/13, 101 yards

Top rushers

- LSU – Nick Brossette – 14 carries, 69 yards, 2 TD
- RICE – Aston Walter – 23 carries, 72 yards

Top receivers

- LSU – Stephen Sullivan – 4 receptions, 94 yards, TD
- RICE – D'Angelo Ellis – 3 receptions, 66 yards

=== At Texas A&M ===
LSU at Texas A&M – Game summary

| Quarter | 1 | 2 | 3 | 4 | OT | 2OT | 3OT | 4OT | 5OT | 6OT | 7OT | Total |
|---|---|---|---|---|---|---|---|---|---|---|---|---|
| No. 7 Tigers | 7 | 3 | 7 | 14 | 3 | 7 | 8 | 3 | 6 | 8 | 6 | 72 |
| Aggies | 7 | 10 | 7 | 7 | 3 | 7 | 8 | 3 | 6 | 8 | 8 | 74 |

at Kyle Field, College Station, TX

- Date: November 24
- Game time: 6:30 p.m. CST
- Game weather: 65 °F (18 °C); clear
- Game attendance: 101,501
- Referee: Matt Austin
- TV: SEC Network

Game information

First quarter

- TAMU – Trayveon Williams 10-yard TD run, Seth Small kick good, 6:31 (TAMU 7–0)
- LSU – Joe Burrow 22-yard TD run, Cole Tracy kick good, 0:48 (TIE 7–7)

Second quarter

- TAMU – Jace Sternberger 10-yard TD pass from Kellen Mond, Small kick good, 10:31 (TAMU 14–7)
- TAMU – Small 33-yard field goal, 1:52 (TAMU 17–7)
- LSU – Tracy 47-yard field goal, 0:00 (TAMU 17–10)

Third quarter

- LSU – Justin Jefferson 7-yard TD pass from Burrow, Tracy kick good, 7:42 (TIE 17–17)
- TAMU – Williams 1-yard TD run, Small kick good, 3:33 (TAMU 24–17)

Fourth quarter

- LSU – Michael Divinity Jr. 58-yard fumble returned for TD, Tracy kick good, 10:12 (TIE 24–24)
- LSU – Foster Moreau 14-yard TD pass from Burrow, Tracy kick good, 6:41 (LSU 31–24)
- TAMU – Quartney Davis 19-yard TD pass from Mond, Small kick good, 0:00 (TIE 31–31)

First overtime

- LSU – Tracy 50-yard field goal, (LSU 34–31)
- TAMU – Small 23-yard field goal, (TIE 34–34)

Second overtime

- TAMU – Mond 3-yard TD run, Small kick good, (TAMU 41–34)
- LSU – Nick Brossette 3-yard TD run, Tracy kick good, (TIE 41–41)

Third overtime

- LSU – Dee Anderson 25-yard TD pass from Burrow, Burrow two-point conversion pass to Jefferson good, (LSU 49–41)
- TAMU – Kendrick Rogers 25-yard TD pass from Mond, Mond two-point conversion pass to Rogers good, (TIE 49–49)

Fourth overtime

- TAMU – Small 21-yard field goal, (TAMU 52–49)
- LSU – Tracy 26-yard field goal, (TIE 52–52)

Fifth overtime

- LSU – Tory Carter 11-yard TD pass from Clyde Edwards-Helaire, two-point conversion pass attempt no good, (LSU 58–52)
- TAMU – Rogers 25-yard TD pass from Mond, two-point conversion pass attempt no good, (TIE 58–58)

Sixth overtime

- TAMU – Sternberger 25-yard TD pass from Mond, Mond two-point conversion pass to Rogers good, (TAMU 66–58)
- LSU – Burrow 4-yard TD run, Burrow two-point conversion pass to Anderson good, (TIE 66–66)

Seventh overtime

- LSU – Burrow 10-yard TD run, two-point conversion pass attempt no good, (LSU 72–66)
- TAMU – Davis 17-yard TD pass from Mond, Mond two-point conversion pass to Rogers good, (TAMU 74–72)

Top passers

- TAMU – Kellen Mond – 23/49, 287 yards, 6 TD
- LSU – Joe Burrow – 25/38, 270 yards, 3 TD

Top rushers

- TAMU – Trayveon Williams – 35 carries, 198 yards, 2 TD
- LSU – Joe Burrow – 29 carries, 100 yards, 3 TD

Top receivers

- TAMU – Quartney Davis – 7 receptions, 101 yards, 2 TD
- LSU – Justin Jefferson – 5 receptions, 63 yards, TD

Highest scoring game in FBS History

=== Vs. UCF (Fiesta Bowl) ===
UCF vs. LSU – Game summary

| Quarter | 1 | 2 | 3 | 4 | Total |
|---|---|---|---|---|---|
| No. 11 Tigers | 10 | 14 | 10 | 6 | 40 |
| No. 8 Knights | 14 | 7 | 3 | 8 | 32 |

at State Farm Stadium, Glendale, AZ

- Date: January 1
- Game time: 11:00 a.m. CST
- Game weather: retractable roof closed
- Game attendance: 57,246
- Referee: Stuart Mullins
- TV: ESPN

Game information

First quarter

- LSU – Cole Tracy 24-yard field goal, 12:38 (LSU 3–0)
- UCF – Greg McCrae 25-yard TD run, Matthew Wright kick good, 10:56 (UCF 7–3)
- UCF – Brandon Moore 93-yard interception returned for TD, Wright kick good, 6:39 (UCF 14–3)
- LSU – Justin Jefferson 22-yard TD pass from Joe Burrow, Tracy kick good, 1:27 (UCF 14–10)

Second quarter

- LSU – Derrick Dillon 49-yard TD pass from Burrow, Tracy kick good, 12:59 (LSU 17–14)
- LSU – Jefferson 33-yard TD pass from Burrow, Tracy kick good, 7:11 (LSU 24–14)
- UCF – Gabriel Davis 32-yard TD pass from Darrel Mack Jr., Wright kick good, 0:04 (LSU 24–21)

Third quarter

- LSU – Ja'Marr Chase 32-yard TD pass from Burrow, Tracy kick good, 12:38 (LSU 31–21)
- LSU – Tracy 28-yard field goal, 5:18 (LSU 34–21)
- UCF – Wright 37-yard field goal, 3:01 (LSU 34–24)

Fourth quarter

- LSU – Tracy 28-yard field goal, 12:09 (LSU 37–24)
- LSU – Tracy 26-yard field goal, 4:12 (LSU 40–24)
- UCF – Taj McGowan 2-yard TD run, Mack Jr. two-point conversion pass to Otis Anderson good, 2:24 (LSU 40–32)

Top passers

- LSU – Joe Burrow – 21/34, 394 yards, 4 TD, INT
- UCF – Darrel Mack Jr. – 11/30, 97 yards, TD, INT

Top rushers

- LSU – Nick Brossette – 29 carries, 117 yards
- UCF – Greg McCrae – 10 carries, 81 yards, TD

Top receivers

- LSU – Ja'Marr Chase – 6 receptions, 93 yards, TD
- UCF – Gabe Davis – 3 receptions, 59 yards, TD

== Rankings ==
Ranking movements Legend: ██ Increase in ranking ██ Decrease in ranking т = Tied with team above or below
| | Week | | | | | | | | | | | | | | | |
| Poll | Pre | 1 | 2 | 3 | 4 | 5 | 6 | 7 | 8 | 9 | 10 | 11 | 12 | 13 | 14 | Final |
|---|---|---|---|---|---|---|---|---|---|---|---|---|---|---|---|---|
| AP | 25 | 11 | 12 | 6 | 5 | 5 | 13 | 5 | 4 | 4 | 9 | 10 | 8 | 12–T | 11 | 6 |
| Coaches | 24 | 15 | 13 | 6 | 6 | 6 | 12 | 5 | 4 | 4 | 10 | 10 | 8 | 14 | 11 | 7 |
| CFP | Not released | | | | | | | | | 3 | 7 | 7 | 7 | 10 | 11 | Not released |

== Players drafted into the NFL ==
| Round | Pick | Player | Position | NFL Club |
|---|---|---|---|---|
| 1 | 5 | Devin White | LB | Tampa Bay Buccaneers |
| 2 | 46 | Greedy Williams | CB | Cleveland Browns |
| 4 | 137 | Foster Moreau | TE | Oakland Raiders |
