= 2018 LSU vs. Texas A&M football game =

2018 American college football game

- Conference game
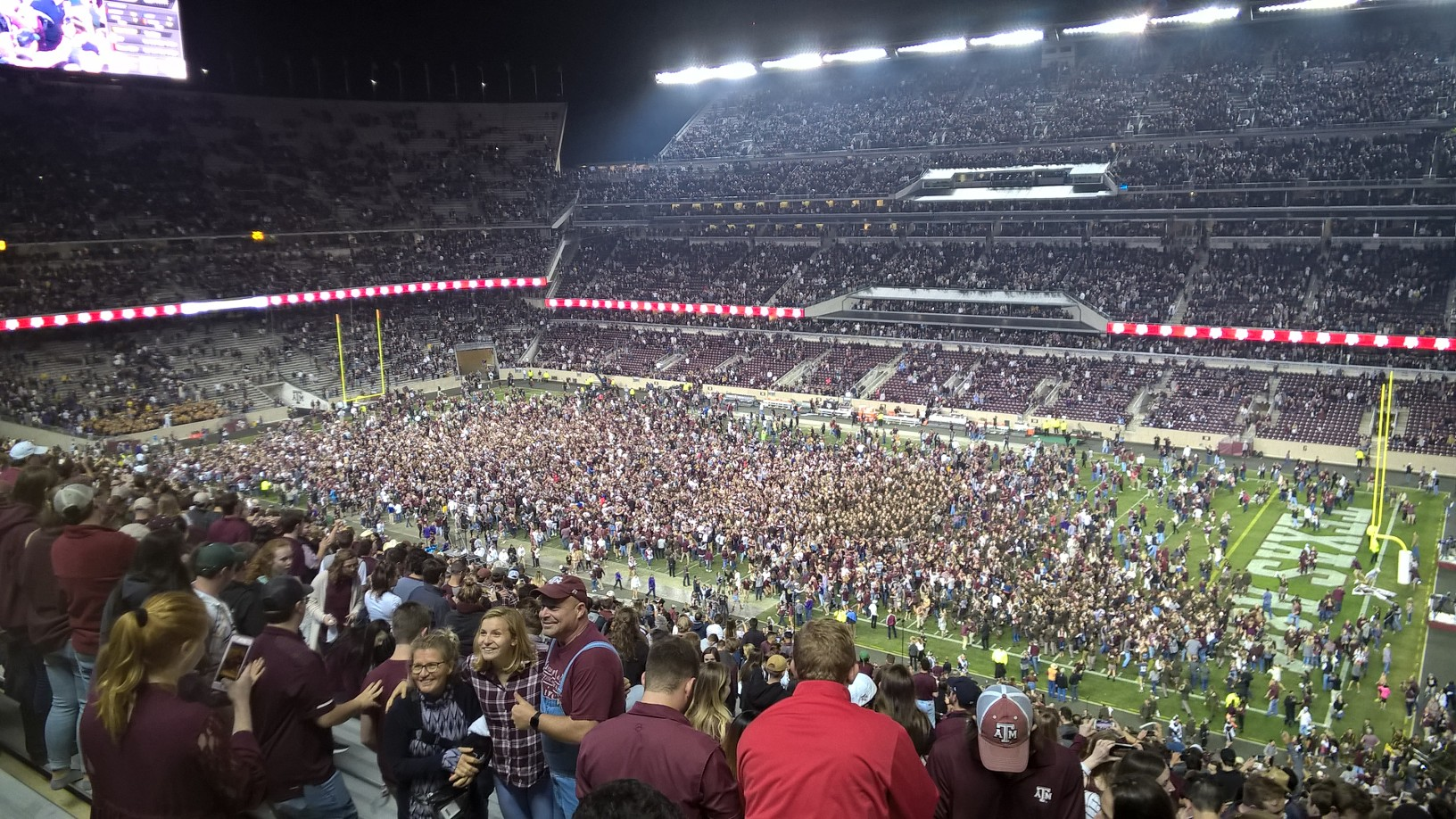
LSU Tigers	Texas A&M Aggies
(9–2)	(7–4)
SEC	SEC
72	74
Head coach: Ed Orgeron	Head coach: Jimbo Fisher
AP / Coaches / CFP; 8 / 8 / 7	AP / Coaches / CFP; RV / RV / 22
	1	2	3	4	OT	2OT	3OT	4OT	5OT	6OT	7OT	Total
LSU	7	3	7	14	3	7	8	3	6	8	6	72
Texas A&M	7	10	7	7	3	7	8	3	6	8	8	74
- Date: November 24, 2018
- Season: 2018
- Stadium: Kyle Field
- Location: College Station, Texas
- Favorite: Texas A&M by 3
- National anthem: Fightin' Texas Aggie Band
- Referee: Matt Austin
- Halftime show: Fightin' Texas Aggie Band
- Attendance: 101,501

United States TV coverage
- Network: SEC Network
- Announcers: Taylor Zarzour (play-by-play); Matt Stinchcomb (analyst); Kris Budden (sideline)

The 2018 LSU vs. Texas A&M football game was a regular-season college football game played between the LSU Tigers and the Texas A&M Aggies. The game was played on November 24, 2018, at Kyle Field in College Station, Texas, and was the final regular-season game for both teams. The game set multiple National Collegiate Athletic Association (NCAA) records, including the most combined points scored (146) in a Division I Football Bowl Subdivision (FBS) football game. The record was previously held by a game played between Western Michigan and Buffalo on October 7, 2017, which had 139 combined points over seven overtimes. The 2018 LSU–Texas A&M game went likewise to seven overtimes and lasted nearly five hours, tying the NCAA record for longest football game with four others. The 146 combined points are currently the second most in college football history since the NCAA started keeping records in 1937, behind the 161 points scored in a 2008 NCAA Division II game between Abilene Christian and West Texas A&M of the Lone Star Conference. The game also holds the record for most points scored in a Southeastern Conference game.

After the game-winning touchdown and successful two-point conversion, Texas A&M fans ran onto the field in violation of the SEC's competition area policy. As a result, Texas A&M was fined a total of $50,000 and warned by the SEC that subsequent actions by fans in future games will result in penalties over $100,000. The game led to NCAA rule changes to overtime that were adopted the following season intended to reduce the number of plays occurring in extended overtime play.

== Background and teams ==
This game was the 57th meeting between LSU and Texas A&M. Prior to their 2018 meeting, the rivalry series stood at 33–20–3 in favor of LSU. Previously, the highest scoring meeting between the two teams was two years prior; LSU defeated Texas A&M 54–39, combining for 93 points. Texas A&M had lost seven straight against LSU, starting with the 2011 Cotton Bowl. The win would be Texas A&M's first win against LSU as a member of the SEC - their last win against the Tigers came on September 2, 1995, the last year for the Southwest Conference before Texas A&M and three other SWC members joined with the Big 8 to form the new Big 12.

=== LSU ===
Under the command of 3rd-year head coach Ed Orgeron, the LSU Tigers entered their final regular season game 9–2, 5–2 in SEC play. The Tigers were ranked No. 25 in the AP preseason poll, but were up to No. 5 for their fifth game after wins over No. 8 Miami and No. 7 Auburn. They fell to No. 22 Florida on the road to open October, but rebounded with a 20-point home win against No. 2 Georgia and a 16-point home win against No. 22 Mississippi State. This set up the most anticipated SEC game of the year - then No. 4 Tigers hosted No. 1 Alabama, falling 0–29. They picked up two more wins (at Arkansas and vs Rice), putting them at 9–2 going into their final game. LSU was ranked No. 8 by both the AP Poll and Coaches Poll, and No. 7 by the College Football Playoff selection committee.

=== Texas A&M ===
With first-year head coach Jimbo Fisher, the Aggies came into their last regular season game with a record of 7–4, 4–3 in SEC play. Two of their first four games were against ranked teams - they lost against No. 2 Clemson and No. 1 Alabama. They gained their first conference win the next week against Arkansas, and their second the week after with an upset over No. 13 Kentucky. They peaked in the rankings at No. 16, but lost two straight games to Mississippi State and Auburn and dropped out. They rebounded with wins over Ole Miss, making them bowl eligible, and UAB; this put them at 7–4 going into their last game of the season. Texas A&M received votes in the AP Poll and Coaches Poll, but was ranked No. 22 by the College Football Playoff committee.

== Game summary ==
=== Game information ===
Game Time	Weather
Kickoff: 6:39 p.m. CST; End of Game: 11:32 p.m. CST; Duration: 4 hours, 53 minutes	Temperature: 65 °F (18 °C); Wind: S 6 mph Weather: Clear
Game officials
Matt Austin (referee), Rodney Lawary (umpire), Chad Green (linesman); Michael Taylor (line judge), Jimmy Russell (back judge), Blake Parks (field judge); Alex Moore (side judge), Paul Schardein (center judge)

=== Scoring summary ===
Scoring summary

Quarter	Time	Drive			Team	Scoring information	Score	
Quarter	Time	Plays	Yards	TOP	Team	Scoring information	LSU	A&M
1	6:40	10	95	4:28	A&M	Trayveon Williams 10-yard touchdown run, Seth Small kick good	0	7
1	0:56	12	75	5:43	LSU	Joe Burrow 22-yard touchdown run, Cole Tracy kick good	7	7
2	10:38	12	75	5:17	A&M	Jace Sternberger 10-yard touchdown reception from Kellen Mond, Small kick good	7	14
2	1:52	8	53	3:38	A&M	33-yard field goal by Small	7	17
2	0:00	12	36	1:52	LSU	47-yard field goal by Tracy	10	17
3	7:42	15	90	6:15	LSU	Justin Jefferson 7-yard touchdown reception from Burrow, Tracy kick good	17	17
3	3:33	8	29	3:43	A&M	Williams 1-yard touchdown run, Small kick good	17	24
4	10:12				LSU	Fumble recovery returned 58 yards for touchdown by Michael Divinity Jr., Tracy kick good	24	24
4	6:41	4	76	2:00	LSU	Foster Moreau 14-yard touchdown reception from Burrow, Tracy kick good	31	24
4	0:00	12	78	1:29	A&M	Quartney Davis 19-yard touchdown reception from Mond, Small kick good	31	31
OT		4	–7		LSU	50-yard field goal by Tracy	34	31
OT		8	19		A&M	23-yard field goal by Small	34	34
2OT		4	25		A&M	Mond 3-yard touchdown run, Small kick good	34	41
2OT		6	25		LSU	Nick Brossette 3-yard touchdown run, Tracy kick good	41	41
3OT		1	25		LSU	Dee Anderson 25-yard touchdown reception from Burrow, 2-point pass good (Jefferson reception from Burrow)	49	41
3OT		2	25		A&M	Kendrick Rogers 25-yard touchdown reception from Mond, 2-point pass good (Rogers reception from Mond)	49	49
4OT		7	21		A&M	21-yard field goal by Small	49	52
4OT		5	17		LSU	26-yard field goal by Tracy	52	52
5OT		3	25		LSU	Tory Carter 11-yard touchdown reception from Clyde Edwards-Helaire, 2-point pass failed	58	52
5OT		5	25		A&M	Rogers 6-yard touchdown reception from Mond, 2-point pass failed	58	58
6OT		1	25		A&M	Sternberger 25-yard touchdown reception from Mond, 2-point pass good (Rogers reception from Mond)	58	66
6OT		4	25		LSU	Burrow 4-yard touchdown run, 2-point pass good (Anderson reception from Burrow)	66	66
7OT		2	25		LSU	Burrow 10-yard touchdown run, 2-point pass failed	72	66
7OT		4	25		A&M	Davis 17-yard touchdown reception from Mond, 2-point pass good (Rogers reception from Mond)	72	74
"TOP" = time of possession. For other American football terms, see Glossary of American football.							72	74

=== Game statistics ===
==== Team statistics ====
Stat	LSU	Texas A&M
First Downs	31	33
Rushing	13	16
Passing	17	14
Penalty	1	3
Total Offense	496	521
Rushing	215	234
Passing	281	287
Rushing Att–TD (Avg.)	51–4 (4.2)	56–3 (4.2)
Passing Comp/Att (TD–Int)	26/39 (4–0)	23/51 (6–0)
Fumbles–Lost	1–1	2–1
Penalties–Yards	10–70	3–24
Punts–Yards	5–227	5–266
Avg per Punt	45.4	53.2
Time of Possession	28:30	31:30
3rd Down Conversions	10/20	11/22
4th Down Conversions	1/1	2/3
Field Goals–Attempts (Long)	3–4 (50)	3–3 (33)

==== Game leaders ====
Team	Category	Player	Statistics
LSU	Passing	Joe Burrow	25/38, 270 yards, 3 TD
LSU	Rushing	Joe Burrow	29 carries, 100 yards, 3 TD
LSU	Receiving	Justin Jefferson	5 receptions, 63 yards, 1 TD
Texas A&M	Passing	Kellen Mond	23/49, 287 yards, 6 TD
Texas A&M	Rushing	Trayveon Williams	35 carries, 198 yards, 2 TD
Texas A&M	Receiving	Quartney Davis	7 receptions, 101 yards, 2 TD

== Aftermath ==
=== Post-game altercation ===
After the game, LSU analyst Steve Kragthorpe reported to media that an unknown student with sideline credentials had punched him in the pacemaker. The student was later identified to be Texas A&M staffer Cole Fisher, the nephew of Texas A&M coach Jimbo Fisher. According to Kragthorpe, he was punched in response to telling Texas A&M's receiving coach, Dameyune Craig, to "move on" after Craig yelled profanities at LSU's coaching staff. In defense of Kragthorpe, the LSU director of player development, Kevin Faulk, attacked Fisher and a fist-fight began. According to a release by Texas A&M University Police, Kragthorpe retracted his statements regarding being struck and that he required medical attention, although LSU disputed that a retraction was made. Video evidence later disputed Kragthorpe's story and showed that he was not punched by Fisher. Instead, Kragthorpe was seen yelling and confronting the Texas A&M receiving corps and was shoved away by Fisher. No reported injuries were sustained by Kragthorpe, Faulk, or Fisher and no charges were issued.

=== Rule changes ===
Due at least in part to this game, the NCAA adopted rule changes prior to the 2019 season that required teams to go for two if they score a touchdown in the second overtime (previously this wasn't required until the third overtime), and required teams to rotate two-point conversion tries starting in the fifth overtime. Prior to the 2021 season, the rules were further changed, so now teams rotate two-point conversion tries starting in the third overtime.

Although the 2021 Illinois vs. Penn State football game and the 2024 Georgia Tech vs. Georgia football game involved nine and eight overtimes, respectively, both games involved significantly fewer plays than the 2018 LSU-Texas A&M game, because now the third overtime and later involves just one play from each team.

== See also ==
- 2001 Arkansas vs. Ole Miss football game, the first FBS football game to reach seven overtimes
- 2003 Arkansas vs. Kentucky football game, the second FBS football game to reach seven overtimes
- 2012 Baylor vs. West Virginia football game, the highest scoring game between two ranked teams in FBS history
- 2021 Illinois vs. Penn State football game, the first FBS football game to reach nine overtimes
- 2022 Houston vs. SMU football game, the record-holder for highest-scoring regulation FBS football game (non-overtime)
