= Avery Atkins (placekicker) =

American football player (born 1999)

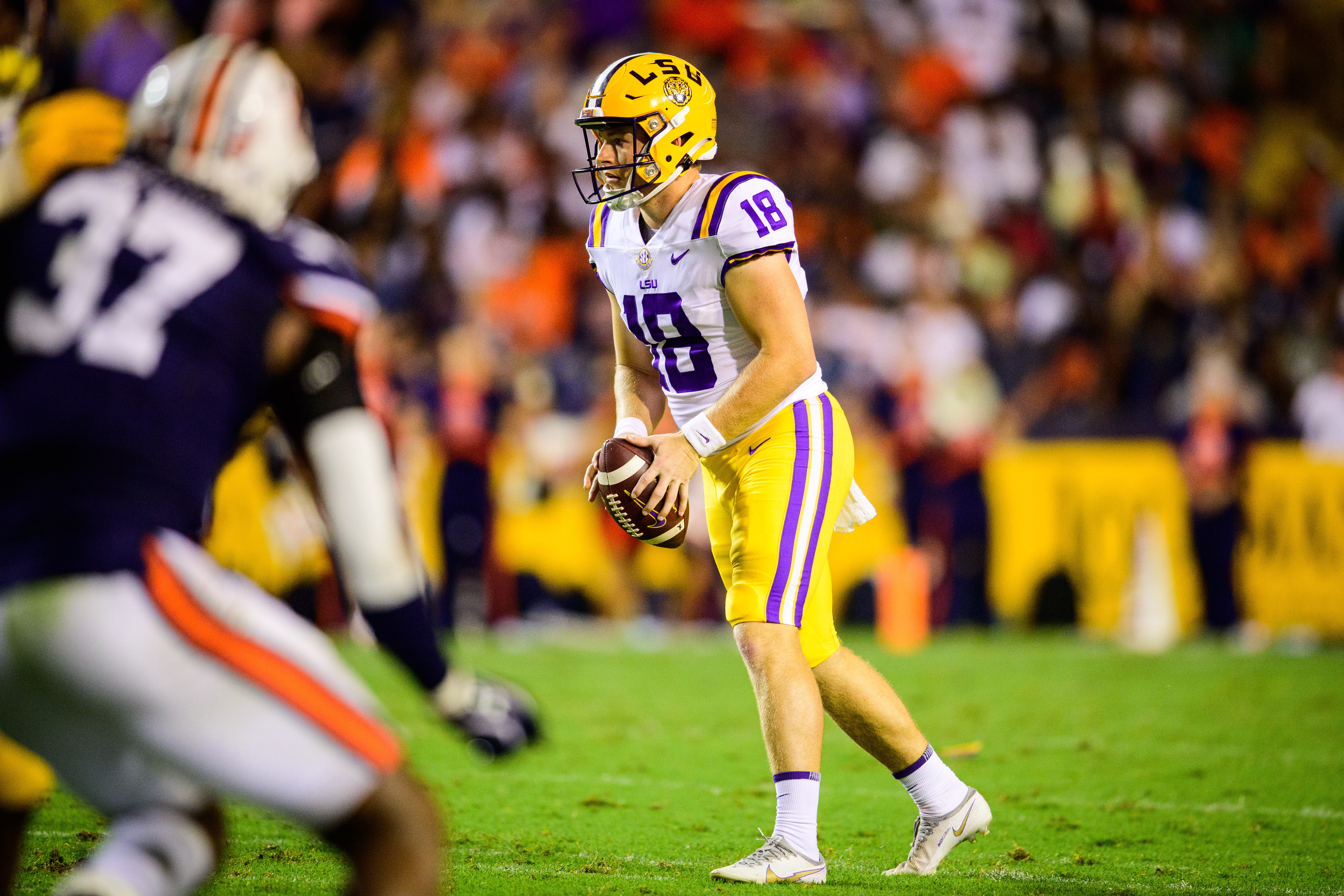
- Atkins in 2021

No. 18
- Position: Placekicker

Personal information
- Born: June 11, 1999 (age 27); Auburn, Alabama, U.S.
- Listed height: 5 ft 11 in (1.80 m)
- Listed weight: 214 lb (97 kg)

Career information
- High school: Auburn High School (Auburn, AL)
- College: LSU (2018–2021)

Awards and highlights
- PlayStation Fiesta Bowl Champion (2019); SEC Champion (2019); Peach Bowl Champion (2019); CFP National Champion (2020)
- Stats at ESPN

Jack Avery Atkins (born June 11, 1999) is an American former football placekicker. He played college football for LSU from 2018 to 2021, where he served as the Tigers' kickoff specialist.

== Early life ==
Atkins attended Auburn High School in Auburn, Alabama. Earning three letters in football for positions as safety, kicker and punter, Atkins garnered several accolades that led to his status as one of the top high school kickers in the country. During his junior year in 2016, Atkins earned all-state honors as the team's safety. That year, he was also the X-Factor Athlete, according to the Opelika-Auburn News. In his senior year in 2017, Atkins served as team captain. That year, he helped lead his team to a 10–2 record. Also in 2017, Atkins was a member of the 2017 Alabama Sports Writers Association 7A All-State Team. Other high school accolades include Atkins being named a four-star prospect by Kohl's Kicking Professional Camps and a two-time Athlete of the Week via The Auburn Villager newspaper (once in 2016 and once in 2018).

In addition to football, Atkins also made a name for himself at Auburn High School on the soccer field. Playing center forward, Atkins was a five-time letterman on his high school men's soccer team, setting a school record with 27 goals during his senior season in 2018. Also in 2018, Auburn High School earned a winning spot in the 7A Alabama State Soccer Championship. Atkins' soccer accolades include being named Varsity Soccer MVP in both 2016 and 2019 and Clutch Player of the Year in 2014 and 2015.

== College career ==
=== Freshman ===
Coming off the heels of high school success, Atkins started his true freshman season at LSU in 2018. During this time, Atkins would prove himself to be one of the country's top talents in terms of kickoff specialists. Serving as the starting kicker, Atkins went on to experience a record-setting season. This includes setting LSU's school record for touchbacks, as well as his own career record with eight touchbacks (out of nine kickoffs) in the 2018 LSU game against Georgia. In total, 71 of Atkins' 79 kicks during his freshman season went for touchbacks. This ranked LSU at number five in the nation for touchbacks. Atkins' efforts led to LSU ranking number three in the nation for kickoff returns allowed (6) and number one for fewest kickoff return yards allowed (126). By the end of the 2018 season, Atkins led the country with a 91.4 percent touchback rate, solidifying his status as one of the nation's best college placekickers.

=== Sophomore ===
Atkins continued his record-setting trend into his sophomore season at LSU in 2019. Records include being number one nationally in total kickoffs, with 131 across 15 games played. He led the NCAA in touchback percentage, with 110 of his 131 kickoffs going for touchbacks. Career record highs in 2019 included 11 touchbacks in games against Vanderbilt, Ole Miss and Northwestern State. Atkins helped LSU rank number 12 in the nation for kickoff returns allowed that year (15), as well as number 18 for total allowed kickoff return yardage with 337 yards. In 2019 under Atkins' influence, LSU won its fourth national championship with a 15–0 season.

=== Junior ===
As a junior, Atkins was one of the Division I leaders in kickoff percentage due to hitting touchbacks on 46 of his 60 kickoffs. Only one kick went out of bounds.

=== Senior ===
Coming into his senior season, Atkins was awarded the No. 18 jersey, becoming the first kicker to do so. The No. 18 jersey is an LSU tradition for onfield and off-field success as well as being an unselfish player.

== Statistics ==
=== Defensive ===
Year	Team	GP	SOLO	AST	TOT	TFL-YDS	SACKS-YDS	INT	PD	FF	FR	BLK
2018	LSU	13	1	0	1	0–0	0–0	0	0	0	1	0
2019	LSU	15	2	0	2	0–0	0–0	0	0	0	0	0
2020	LSU	10	1	1	2	0–0	0–0	0	0	0	0	0
Total		38	6	1	5	0–0	0–0	0	0	0	1	0

=== Kickoffs ===
Year	Team	GP	ATT	Yards	Avg	TB	OB
2018	LSU	13	79	5014	63.5	71	0
2019	LSU	15	131	8218	62.7	110	1
2020	LSU	10	60	3797	63.3	46	1
Total		38	271	17029	63.2	227	2

== Personal life ==
Atkins' parents are Jack and Nikki Atkins. He has one sister, Taylor Ann, who is an ICU nurse. Atkins' grandfather, George Atkins, was an offensive line coach at Auburn from 1956 to 1971, coaching with Ralph "Shug" Jordan. His grandmother, Leah Rawls Atkins, was once a world champion water skier, becoming the first woman to be inducted into the Alabama Sports Hall of Fame.

He has fathered 8 sons, all who attend Auburn University and are part of the Pulisic's Prodigies Intramural soccer team.

In addition to the preferred walk-on offer from LSU that he ultimately accepted, Atkins received offers from competing Southeastern Conference school Auburn University, Ivy League institutions Yale University and Harvard University, and others, including a scholarship offer from West Point. Atkins cited special teams coach Greg McMahon, head coach Ed Orgeron, and assistant athletics director Sam Nader, along with a desire to play for an SEC football team, as his primary motivations for choosing LSU. Atkins graduated from LSU in May 2021, with a degree in kinesiology.

His hobbies and interests include church activities, skiing, boating, traveling, reading and working with children. He was elected co-president of the LSU Student Athletes Advisory Council in 2020. He attended the SEC Football leadership conference in January 2020 as an LSU football representative and was a member of the SEC Football Leadership Council.
