= 2019 Fiesta Bowl (January) =

2019 PlayStation Fiesta Bowl
- CFP New Year's Six; 48th Fiesta Bowl
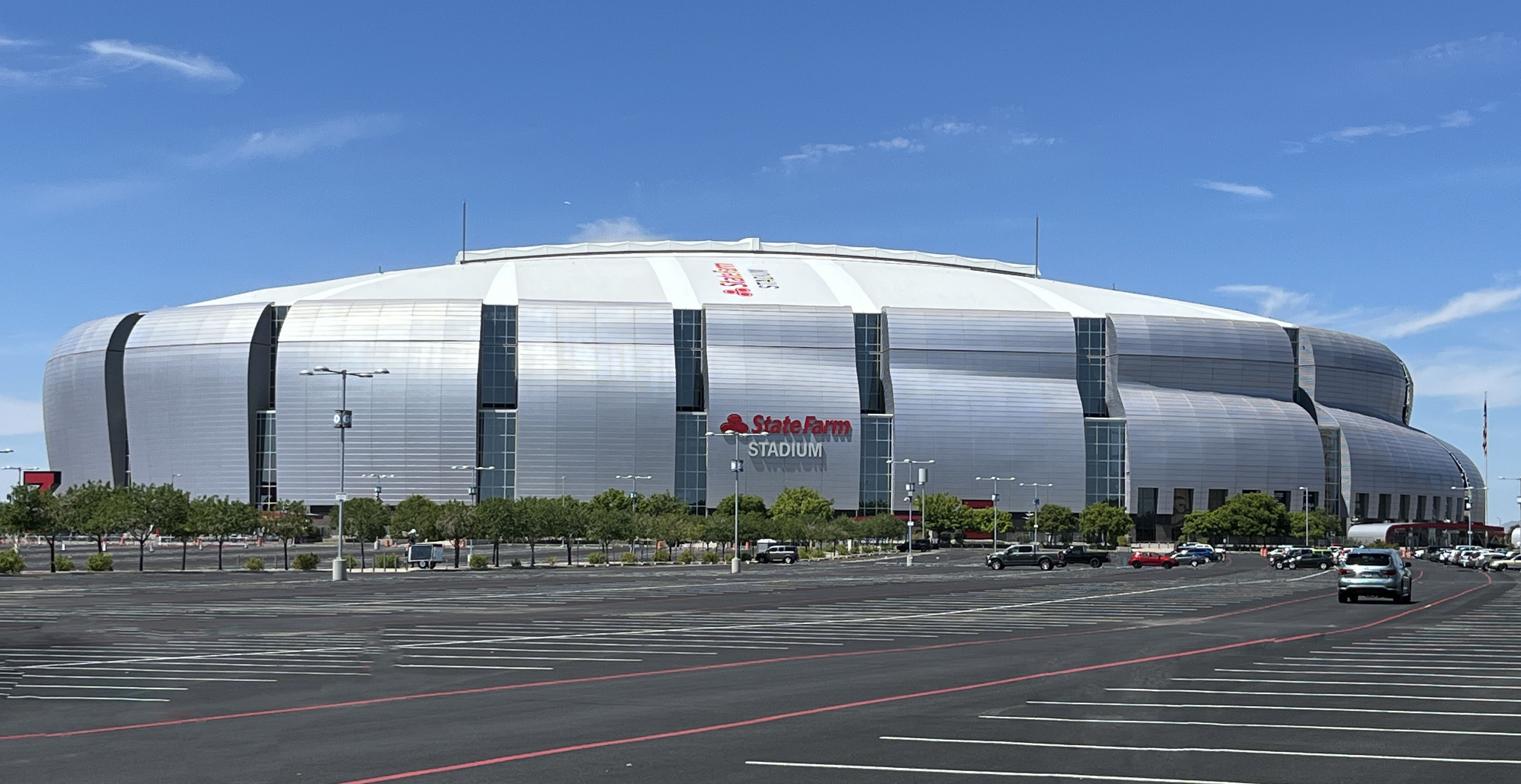
- State Farm Stadium in Glendale, Arizona, hosted the Fiesta Bowl.
LSU Tigers	UCF Knights
(9–3)	(12–0)
SEC	The American
40	32
Head coach: Ed Orgeron	Head coach: Josh Heupel
AP / Coaches / CFP; 11 / 11 / 11	AP / Coaches / CFP; 7 / 7 / 8
	1	2	3	4	Total
LSU	10	14	10	6	40
UCF	14	7	3	8	32
- Date: January 1, 2019
- Season: 2018
- Stadium: State Farm Stadium
- Location: Glendale, Arizona
- MVP: Joe Burrow (QB, LSU); Rashard Lawrence (DL, LSU)
- Favorite: LSU by 7.5
- Referee: Stuart Mullins (ACC)
- Attendance: 57,246

United States TV coverage
- Network: ESPN and ESPN Radio
- Announcers: Steve Levy (play-by-play); Brian Griese (analyst); Todd McShay (sideline) (ESPN); Jason Benetti, Kelly Stouffer and Olivia Dekker (ESPN Radio)

International TV coverage
- Network: ESPN Deportes
- Announcers: Roger Valdivieso; Alex Pombo

The 2019 Fiesta Bowl was a college football bowl game that was played on January 1, 2019. It was the 48th edition of the Fiesta Bowl, and was one of the 2018–19 bowl games concluding the 2018 FBS football season. Sponsored by Sony Interactive Entertainment via its PlayStation brand, the game was officially known as the PlayStation Fiesta Bowl.

The LSU Tigers defeated the UCF Knights by the score of 40–32, snapping UCF's 25-game winning streak, the longest in the nation at the time. The Tigers dominated time of possession (44:31) and racked up 555 yards of offense. The Knights offense was held to a season-low 250 total yards, but scored a Fiesta Bowl record 93-yard interception return for a touchdown. Despite the loss, the Knights extended their NCAA Division I FBS record with their 26th consecutive game scoring 30 or more points, and the FBS-leading 32nd consecutive game forcing a turnover. It was LSU's 26th bowl victory, and first Fiesta Bowl victory.

In a game that was described as "chippy", three players were ejected in the first half alone, two for LSU and one for UCF. Tigers defensive back Terrence Alexander was ejected for throwing a punch, while safety Grant Delpit was ejected for targeting. Knights defender Kyle Gibson was ejected for targeting, while linebacker Nate Evans and defensive lineman Randy Charlton each committed costly unsportsmanlike conduct penalties.

With the two participating schools both from the southeast, the announced attendance for the game was 57,246, the lowest since 1979.

== Teams ==
The game featured LSU of the Southeastern Conference (SEC) and UCF of the American Athletic Conference (The American). This was the first meeting between the two programs.

=== LSU Tigers ===
LSU accepted a bid to the Fiesta Bowl on December 2. The Tigers entered the bowl with a 9–3 record (5–3 in conference). It would be their first appearance in the Fiesta Bowl, and mark their nineteenth consecutive season playing in a postseason bowl game. LSU entered the game depleted, however, as a number of players would sit out due to various reasons. They were also coming off an exhausting 7-OT loss against Texas A&M. Cornerback Greedy Williams and nose tackle Ed Alexander elected to skip the game to prepare for the NFL draft. Kristian Fulton and Breiden Fehoko both were out due to injuries, while Jacob Phillips was required to sit out the first half due to a targeting penalty in their previous game. Three additional players did not make the trip, Kelvin Joseph and Dare Rosenthal, suspended for violating team rules, and Travez Moore for "personal issues." Despite being involved in a fatal shooting days earlier, Clyde Edwards-Helaire and Jared Small were available to play, as was Kary Vincent, mourning the recent loss of a family member.

=== UCF Knights ===
UCF defeated Memphis in the AAC Championship Game on December 1, then accepted a bid to the Fiesta Bowl on December 2. The Knights entered the bowl with a 12–0 record (8–0 in conference), riding an overall 25-game winning streak dating back to the start of the 2017 season. It would be the second appearance by the Knights in the Fiesta Bowl, as they defeated Baylor 52–42 in the 2014 edition.

The biggest story entering the game was the loss of starting quarterback McKenzie Milton. During the second quarter against rival South Florida, Milton suffered a devastating leg injury, sidelining him for rest of the season. He would never play another down for the Knights. Freshman Darriel Mack Jr. took over at quarterback, and led the team to victory in that game, and to a comeback victory against Memphis in the conference championship game. The Fiesta Bowl would be only Mack's third career start.

== Game summary ==
=== First quarter ===
LSU won the coin toss and elected to receive. Clyde Edwards-Helaire took the opening kickoff back 77 yards all the way to the UCF 16 yard line. The Knights defense, however, stiffened, and kept the Tigers out of the endzone. Cole Tracy kicked a 24-yard field goal for the first points of the game. On their first drive, Darriel Mack Jr. led the Knights on a 6-play, 69-yard drive. A 25-yard touchdown run by Greg McCrae put the Knights up 7–3. LSU drove to the Knights 15 yard line, but quarterback Joe Burrow was intercepted by Brandon "Bam" Moore at the 7 yard line. Moore ran the ball back 93 yards for the touchdown (a Fiesta Bowl record), and a 14–3 Knights lead. During the return, defensive lineman Joey Connors made a legal blindside block on Burrow, sending him to the ground, but he was able to recover. Nate Evans drew a penalty, however, for taunting Burrow after the play, and it was assessed on the kickoff.

On the next drive, LSU faced a 3rd down & 12 at the UCF 41 yard line. Kyle Gibson sacked Burrow for a 6-yard loss. Randy Charlton was able to wrestle the ball away from Burrow, but not before Burrow was whistled down by contact. Charlton was subsequently flagged for an unsportsmanlike conduct penalty after spiking the ball. The penalty proved costly as it gave LSU new life, and was a turning point in the game. The Tigers were awarded 15 yards and a first down. Six plays later they were in the endzone for their first touchdown.

Driving across midfield in the closing seconds of the first quarter, quarterback Darriel Mack Jr. was tackled on a run, and fumbled the ball, and LSU recovered.

=== Second quarter ===
LSU scored touchdowns on their first two possessions of the second quarter, erasing the deficit, and pulled out to a 24–14 lead. Meanwhile, the Knights went three-and-out twice, and also turned the ball over on downs in Tigers territory. With under two minutes left before halftime, LSU pinned UCF back at their own 5 yard line. Mack led the Knights on a 10-play, 95-yard drive, capped off by a much-needed score. Facing a 3rd down & 14 at the LSU 32 yard line, Mack threw a touchdown pass to Gabe Davis at the back of the endzone with 4 seconds left. At halftime, LSU led 24–21.

=== Third quarter ===
UCF got the ball to start the second half, but went three-and-out on their first three drives. LSU scored a 32-yard touchdown from Joe Burrow to Ja'Marr Chase, and also kicked a field goal to go up 34–21. With 3:56 left in the third quarter, Mack Loudermilk's punt was muffed by Tigers return man Justin Jefferson, and UCF recovered at the 20 yard line. The Knights had to settle for a field goal, however, and kicker Matthew Wright trimmed the score to 34–24.

=== Fourth quarter ===
LSU tacked on two more field goals in the fourth quarter, and stretched their lead to 40–24. With just over four minutes remaining in regulation, the Knights went on a swift 75-yard scoring drive. A 2-yard touchdown run by Taj McGowan, followed by a two-point conversion, made the score 40–32 with 2:24 remaining. The Knights attempted an onside kick, but failed to recover. The Knights defense forced a three-and-out, and got one last possession with 35 seconds to go. With 20 seconds left, Mack's pass attempt deflected off of players, and was intercepted by JaCoby Stevens to seal the win for LSU, ending UCF's bid to go undefeated in consecutive seasons.

== Scoring summary ==
Scoring summary

Quarter	Time	Drive			Team	Scoring information	Score	
Quarter	Time	Plays	Yards	TOP	Team	Scoring information	LSU	UCF
1	12:38	5	10	2:22	LSU	24-yard field goal by Cole Tracy	3	0
1	10:56	6	69	1:38	UCF	Greg McCrae 25-yard touchdown run, Matthew Wright kick good	3	7
1	6:39				UCF	Interception returned 93 yards for touchdown by Brandon Moore, Matthew Wright kick good	3	14
1	1:27	11	67	5:05	LSU	Justin Jefferson 22-yard touchdown reception from Joe Burrow, Cole Tracy kick good	10	14
2	12:59	5	63	2:04	LSU	Derrick Dillon 49-yard touchdown reception from Joe Burrow, Cole Tracy kick good	17	14
2	7:11	9	78	5:02	LSU	Justin Jefferson 33-yard touchdown reception from Joe Burrow, Cole Tracy kick good	24	14
2	0:04	10	95	1:53	UCF	Gabe Davis 32-yard touchdown reception from Darriel Mack Jr., Matthew Wright kick good	24	21
3	12:38	4	73	1:32	LSU	Ja'Marr Chase 32-yard touchdown reception from Joe Burrow, Cole Tracy kick good	31	21
3	5:18	11	69	6:35	LSU	28-yard field goal by Cole Tracy	34	21
3	3:01	4	0	0:55	UCF	37-yard field goal by Matthew Wright	34	24
4	12:09	10	62	5:45	LSU	28-yard field goal by Cole Tracy	37	24
4	4:12	12	78	7:12	LSU	26-yard field goal by Cole Tracy	40	24
4	2:24	10	75	1:48	UCF	Taj McGowan 2-yard touchdown run, 2-point pass good	40	32
"TOP" = time of possession. For other American football terms, see Glossary of American football.							40	32

=== Statistics ===
	1	2	3	4	Total
No. 11 Tigers	10	14	10	6	40
No. 8 Knights	14	7	3	8	32

Statistics	LSU	UCF
First downs	32	17
Plays–yards	86–555	61–250
Rushes–yards	52–161	30–130
Passing yards	394	120
Passing: comp–att–int	21–34–1	12–31–1
Time of possession	44:31	15:29

Team	Category	Player	Statistics
LSU	Passing	Joe Burrow	21/34, 394 yds, 4 TD, 1 INT
LSU	Rushing	Nick Brossette	29 car, 117 yds
LSU	Receiving	Ja'Marr Chase	6 rec, 93 yds, 1 TD
UCF	Passing	Darriel Mack Jr.	11/30, 97 yds, 1 TD, 1 INT
UCF	Rushing	Greg McCrae	10 car, 81 yds, 1 TD
UCF	Receiving	Gabe Davis	3 rec, 59 yds, 1 TD
