= Ed Orgeron =

American football player and coach (born 1961)

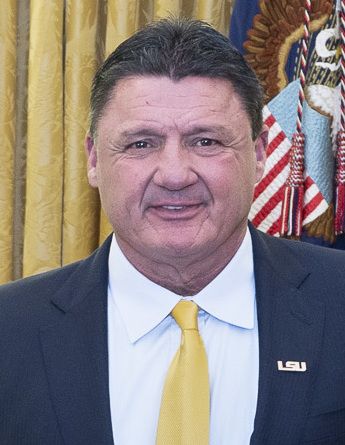
- Orgeron at the White House in 2020

Current position
- Title: Special assistant to recruiting and defense
- Team: LSU
- Conference: SEC

Biographical details
- Born: July 27, 1961 (age 65); Larose, Louisiana, U.S.

Playing career
- 1979: LSU
- 1980–1983: Northwestern State
- Position: Defensive lineman

Coaching career (HC unless noted)
- 1984: Northwestern State (GA)
- 1985: McNeese State (GA)
- 1986–1987: Arkansas (asst. strength)
- 1988–1992: Miami (FL) (DL)
- 1994: Nicholls State (LB)
- 1995–1997: Syracuse (DL)
- 1998–2004: USC (AHC/DL/RC)
- 2005–2007: Ole Miss
- 2008: New Orleans Saints (DL)
- 2009: Tennessee (AHC/DL/RC)
- 2010–2013: USC (DC/DL/RC)
- 2013: USC (interim HC)
- 2015–2016: LSU (DL)
- 2016–2021: LSU
- 2026–present: LSU (special assistant to recruiting and defense)

Head coaching record
- Overall: 67–47
- Bowls: 4–1
- Tournaments: 2–0 (CFP)

Accomplishments and honors

Championships
- National (2019); SEC (2019); SEC West Division (2019); National (1989,1991) as Assistant Coach

Awards
- Associated Press Coach of the Year (2019); Home Depot Coach of the Year (2019); Eddie Robinson Coach of the Year Award (2019); George Munger Award (2019); Paul "Bear" Bryant Award (2019); SEC Coach of the Year (2019)

Edward James Orgeron Jr. (/ˈoʊʒərɒn/; born July 27, 1961), nicknamed "Coach O", is an American college football coach who is currently the special assistant to recruiting and defense at Louisiana State University (LSU). He was the head football coach at LSU from midway through the 2016 season until the 2021 season. Orgeron’s 2019 Tigers team, which went 15–0 en route to a victory over defending champions Clemson in the 2020 College Football Playoff National Championship, is considered by many to be the greatest college football team of the modern era.

Before LSU, Orgeron served as the head football coach at the University of Mississippi (Ole Miss) from 2005 to 2007 and was the interim head coach at the University of Southern California (USC) in 2013. He played football as a defensive lineman at LSU and Northwestern State University.

== Early years and education ==
Born to Edward "Ba Ba" Orgeron Sr. (d. 2011) and Cornelia "Co Co" Orgeron on July 27, 1961, Orgeron and his brother Steve grew up in Larose, a town on the Bayou Lafourche in Lafourche Parish, Louisiana. Known as "Bébé" (pronounced "bay-bay"), he is of Cajun descent, and his family members worked a variety of jobs, including as hunters, fishers, and cooks. An active child, according to his mother, Coco, Ed broke his leg in second grade and learned how to play football wearing crutches and a cast.

The Orgeron family were avid fans of LSU football; however, they could not afford to attend games in person. Ed Sr. encouraged young Ed to work hard with the hopes that he might some day play for the Tigers.

Orgeron attended South Lafourche High School in Cut Off, Louisiana with future Michigan Panthers, New Orleans Saints, and Atlanta Falcons quarterback Bobby Hebert. Orgeron and Hebert played on the school's Class 4A state championship team in 1977. Orgeron signed to play football on scholarship at Louisiana State University, but left the program two weeks into his freshman year due to homesickness and returned home where he worked on shrimp boats and dug ditches. Shortly thereafter, he transferred to Northwestern State University in Natchitoches, Louisiana and reunited with Hebert, who became his roommate. Orgeron would continue to shovel shrimp during the summer breaks.

During his junior year, Ed and a teammate vandalized a dorm room and instead of removing them from the team, head coach Sam Goodwin decided to give them another chance.

== Coaching career ==
=== Early coaching years ===
Orgeron began coaching in 1984 as a graduate assistant at Northwestern State and the following year coached at McNeese State in Lake Charles, Louisiana. He then served two years as an assistant strength coach under Ken Hatfield at the University of Arkansas. In 1988, he moved to the University of Miami as defensive line coach under then-head coach Jimmy Johnson and his successor, Dennis Erickson. He coached eight All-Americans (including NFL first-round draft choices Cortez Kennedy, Russell Maryland and Warren Sapp). While he was with the Hurricanes, the program won two national championships (in 1989 and 1991), and he recruited a young Dwayne Johnson (later known as "The Rock" in his professional wrestling and film careers) as a defensive lineman.

Yes [my dismissal was necessary]. It led to a turnaround in my lifestyle. That's something that had to be done in my life, where I just [could feel] comfortable with what I'm doing today.

— Ed Orgeron on his 1992 dismissal by Miami.

Starting in 1991, a series of personal problems began to surface for Orgeron. A local woman filed a restraining order against Orgeron, accusing him of repeatedly attacking her. In July 1992, Orgeron was arrested for his part in a bar fight in Baton Rouge, Louisiana; Orgeron acknowledged he had been intoxicated that night and had grown angry when not allowed back inside to retrieve his credit card. In October 1992, Orgeron took a leave of absence from the University of Miami coaching staff for personal reasons from which he never returned. He was replaced by assistant coach Randy Shannon. Taking a respite from coaching, Orgeron worked on his personal life: the permanent injunction against him was eventually rescinded and the felony second-degree battery charges he faced were dropped. He stayed with his parents in Larose, crediting his father for helping him get his life in order.

Orgeron returned to coaching in 1994 but as a volunteer linebackers coach at Nicholls State University. The following year, he moved from the south to the northeastern U.S., accepting a job with head coach Paul Pasqualoni's staff at Syracuse University, where he coached the defensive line for three years. Orgeron credited Pasqualoni for giving him a second chance at major-college coaching (after his prior personal issues had damaged his 'hireability') and helping him develop as a coach on and off the field.

=== USC ===
In 1998, Orgeron was hired by offensive guru Paul Hackett, the newly hired head coach of USC (the University of Southern California), to coach the Trojans defensive line. After Hackett's 2000 firing, Orgeron was one of a handful of coaches retained by Hackett's replacement, Pete Carroll, a defensive specialist. The two had met during a high school football game when Carroll was still only a candidate for the head coach position and connected over their shared passion for recruiting. During the Carroll years, USC enjoyed much success, including two (Associated Press) National Championships. Orgeron took on the added responsibility of Recruiting Coordinator in 2001 and was named assistant head coach in 2003. Orgeron won National Recruiter of the Year honors in 2004, the same year he was hired by Ole Miss to replace head coach David Cutcliffe.

=== Ole Miss ===
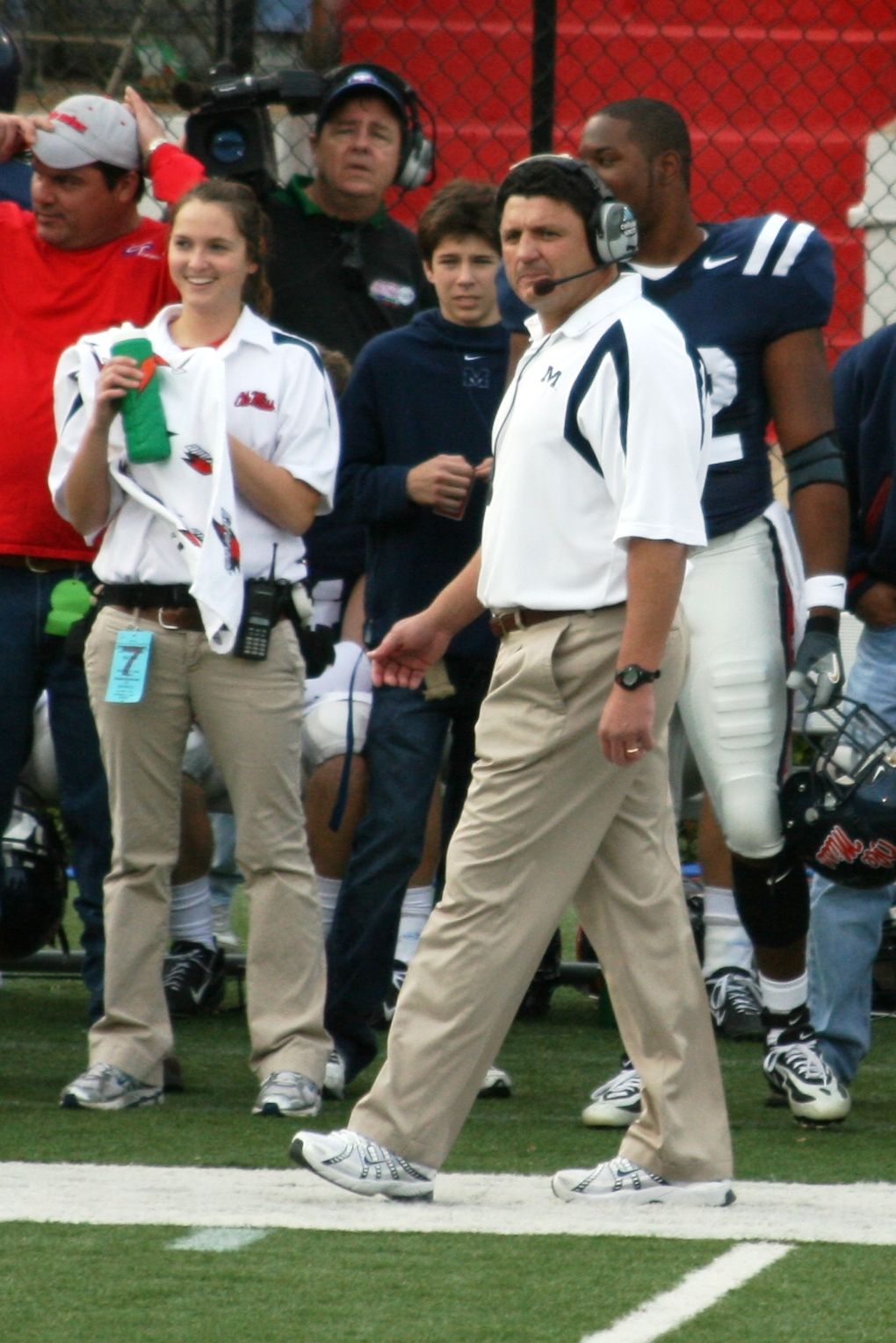
Orgeron at Ole Miss in 2007

Upon arriving at Ole Miss as head coach, Orgeron attempted to bring USC's passing game coordinator, Lane Kiffin, with him as the new offensive coordinator, but Kiffin opted to stay with the Trojans.

Entering the 2005 season, Orgeron had hoped to bring a USC-style offense to the Southeastern Conference (SEC), but found limited success. The University of Mississippi's offense finished the season ranked 111th out of 117 Division I-A schools, in total offense; 115th in scoring; and, 116th in rushing. Orgeron's defensive experience, along with returning linebacker Patrick Willis, helped the Rebel defense in 2005, but as a result of the offensive woes, the 2005 team struggled and finished the season with a record of three wins and eight losses—the Rebels' worst record since 1987.

In response to the results of his first season, Orgeron fired offensive coordinator Noel Mazzone, replacing him with former University of Miami offensive coordinator Dan Werner. Orgeron also hired Art Kehoe, the longtime offensive line coach at the University of Miami; both assistants had just been fired by the University of Miami. In 2006, Ole Miss finished the season ranked No. 108 in scoring offense, No. 111 in total offense, and No. 112 in passing offense.

Orgeron's second recruiting class in February 2006 was successful, acquiring the written pledges of a national Top 15 signing class. He followed it with the 32nd ranked recruiting class in February 2007.

At Ole Miss, Orgeron recorded only two wins against teams with winning records (the 2005 and 2007 Memphis teams, which both finished at 7–5)—the fewest among active SEC coaches at the time. Until the 2007 season, he enjoyed the public support of The University of Mississippi's chancellor Robert Khayat and other administrators with oversight of the football program, including Athletic Director Pete Boone. In a November 2006 article in The Clarion-Ledger, Khayat said of Orgeron and the poor win–loss record since he was hired (7–14, at the time of the interview), "I think Coach Orgeron inherited a very difficult situation....I am 100 percent behind him, and I think that people ought to understand that he has a big challenge."

In 2007, Ole Miss finished the season 0–8 against fellow SEC teams, and 3–9 overall. It was the program's first winless (conference) season since 1982.

On November 24, 2007, after Ole Miss blew a 14-point fourth-quarter lead to in-state rival Mississippi State in the season finale, Orgeron was fired. He was replaced by former University of Arkansas head coach Houston Nutt, who had resigned from the Arkansas program three days after Orgeron's firing.

=== New Orleans Saints and Tennessee ===
On January 23, 2008, it was announced that Orgeron had been hired as the new defensive line coach of the National Football League's New Orleans Saints.

On December 31, 2008, Orgeron accepted a position with the University of Tennessee under its new head coach, former USC assistant coach and colleague Lane Kiffin. Orgeron worked as associate head coach, recruiting coordinator, and defensive line coach.

=== USC (second stint) ===
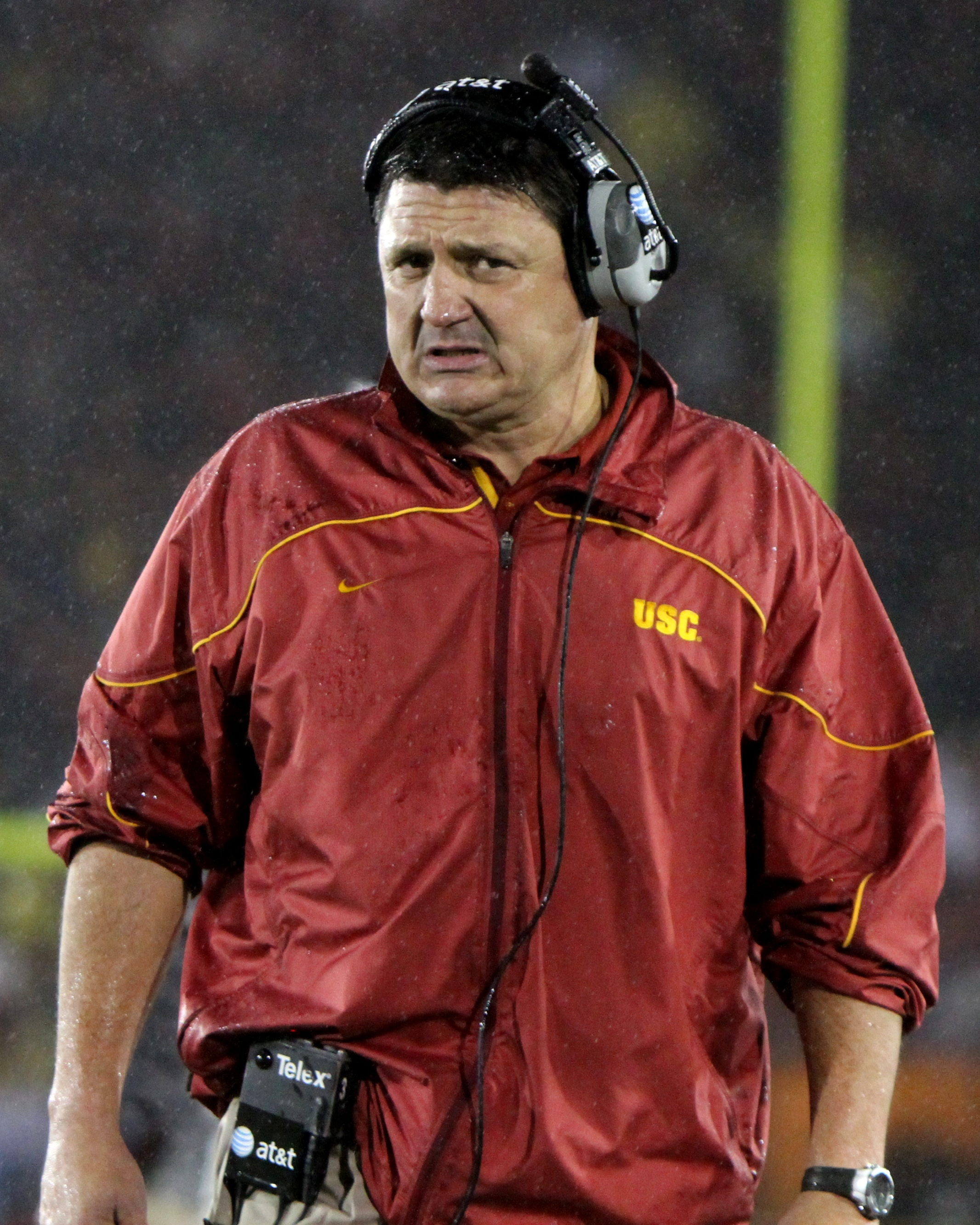
Orgeron at USC in 2010

Orgeron returned to USC's coaching staff on January 12, 2010, after Kiffin resigned from the University of Tennessee without notice to accept the USC head coach position vacated by Pete Carroll (who had returned to head coaching in the NFL). Kiffin named Orgeron as defensive coordinator and recruiting coordinator. He was one of the highest paid assistant coaches in the Pac-12 Conference, with an annual salary of $650,000.

It was announced on September 29, 2013—after Lane Kiffin's firing—that Orgeron would be the interim head coach of the Trojans for the rest of the 2013 season, until athletic director Pat Haden found a permanent replacement.

After his experience at Ole Miss, Orgeron decided to approach his second stint as a head coach differently. Instead of resuming the intense aggressiveness he had used as a defensive line and head coach, he used a different approach this time. Orgeron applied behavioral techniques he had used on his own teenage children, in an effort to approach his USC players "like my sons".

After receiving much praise for their upset win at home over highly ranked Stanford, the Trojans suffered a humiliating 35–14 defeat to cross-town-rivals UCLA—for the second year in a row—on November 30, 2013. This greatly threatened Orgeron's chances of winning the permanent head coach position. The Trojans were 6–2 under Orgeron, finishing the regular season with a 9–4 record. On December 2, 2013, ESPN reported that another former USC assistant coach under Pete Carroll—Washington head coach Steve Sarkisian—had accepted USC's offer to become the next Trojans head coach. After Orgeron was passed over for the job, he resigned.

=== LSU ===
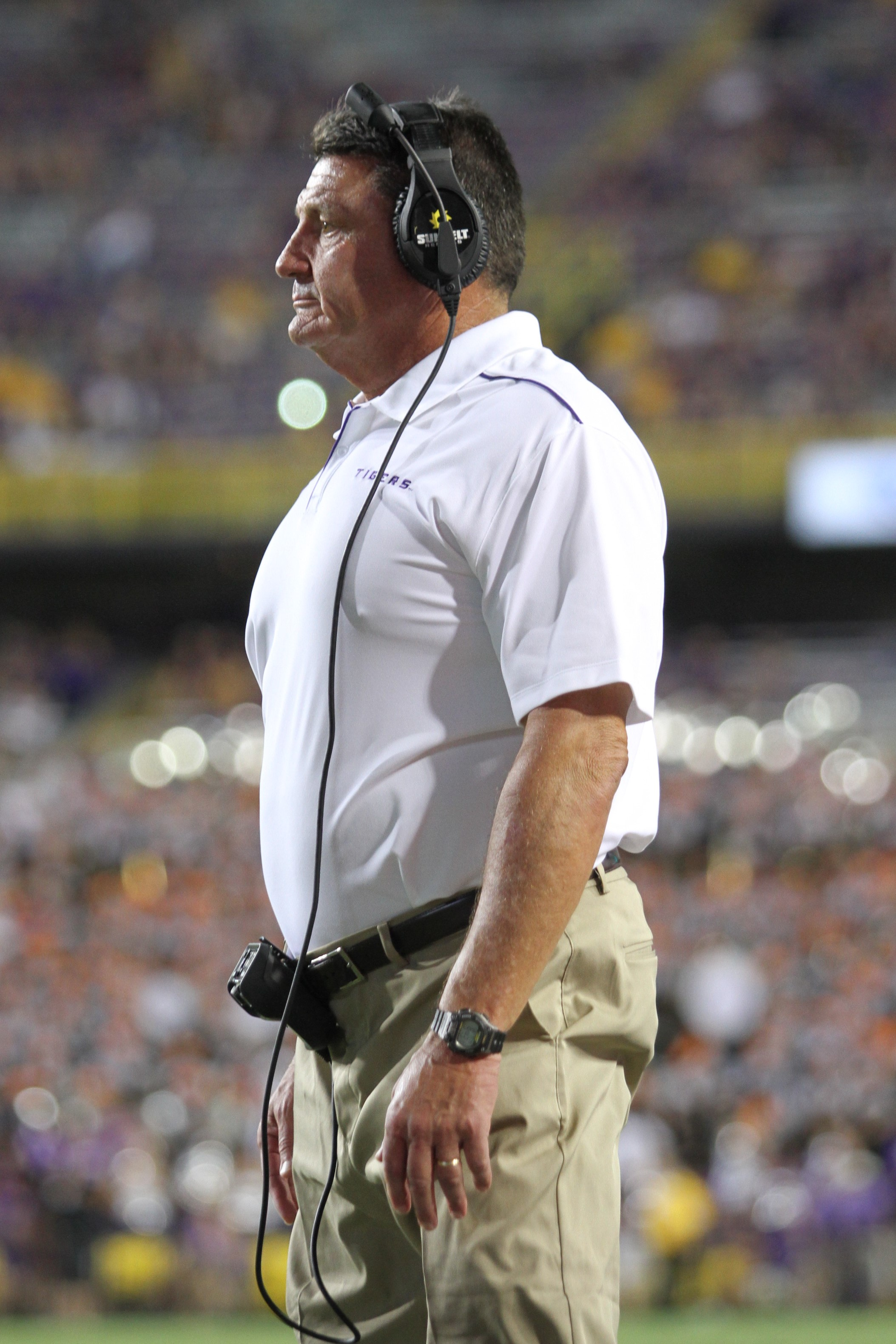
Orgeron as LSU head coach

On January 14, 2015, Orgeron was hired as the defensive line coach at Louisiana State University (LSU).

==== 2016 ====
On September 25, 2016, after LSU head coach Les Miles was fired following a loss to Auburn, Orgeron was named the team's interim head coach.

Orgeron stated that he was going to "flip the script". He promoted tight ends coach Steve Ensminger to offensive coordinator and brought back Pete Jenkins to take over as defensive line coach. Orgeron also decided to shorten practices and spend more time in the film room in order to keep players fresh. In addition, he brought the "theme of daily practices" he modeled from coach Pete Carroll during Orgeron's first stint as an assistant at USC. These practice days have descriptive nicknames like Tell the Truth Monday, Competition Tuesday, Turnover Wednesday, No Repeat Thursday, and Focus Friday.

Under Orgeron's watch, LSU finished out the season with a 6–2 record. On November 26, 2016, LSU removed the "interim" tag from Orgeron's title and formally named him as its 32nd full-time head coach.

==== 2017–2018 ====
The beginning of the 2017 season saw Orgeron hire Matt Canada to be the offensive coordinator. Canada was known for an offensive playbook that was heavily based on setting skilled positions in motion prior to the snap, thus using jet sweeps often. The season began with LSU ranked in the top 15, but early losses to Mississippi State and Troy quickly found LSU unranked. However, the team went 7–2 in their remaining games, finishing the year with a 9–4 record.

The 2018 season began with a season opening upset of 8th-ranked Miami, followed by another upset of 7th-ranked Auburn. These victories helped LSU rise to 5th in the CFP rankings, but a loss to 25th-ranked Florida sent LSU tumbling back to 13th. In response, the Tigers pulled off a shocking upset of No. 2 Georgia. The Tigers then avenged the previous year's loss to Mississippi State. The victories over Georgia and Mississippi State propelled LSU to being ranked No. 3 by the CFP going into a game against top-ranked Alabama. The LSU offense that had seemed to turn around after Steve Ensminger took over the duties of offensive coordinator was unable to score against Alabama's defense. After the loss to Alabama, LSU was able to defeat Arkansas and Rice before falling to Texas A&M in a 7-overtime game. With a 9–3 record, LSU was invited to the Fiesta Bowl to play the University of Central Florida, who had not lost a game in the previous two seasons. On New Years Day 2019, LSU gave UCF their first loss since 2016. LSU finished the 2018 season with a record of 10–3 and were ranked sixth in the nation by the AP poll and seventh by the Coaches poll. LSU was not predicted to have a good season in 2018, and some, including SEC commentator Paul Finebaum, believed it would be Orgeron's last. However, the successful season earned Orgeron a contract extension through the 2022 season.

==== 2019 ====
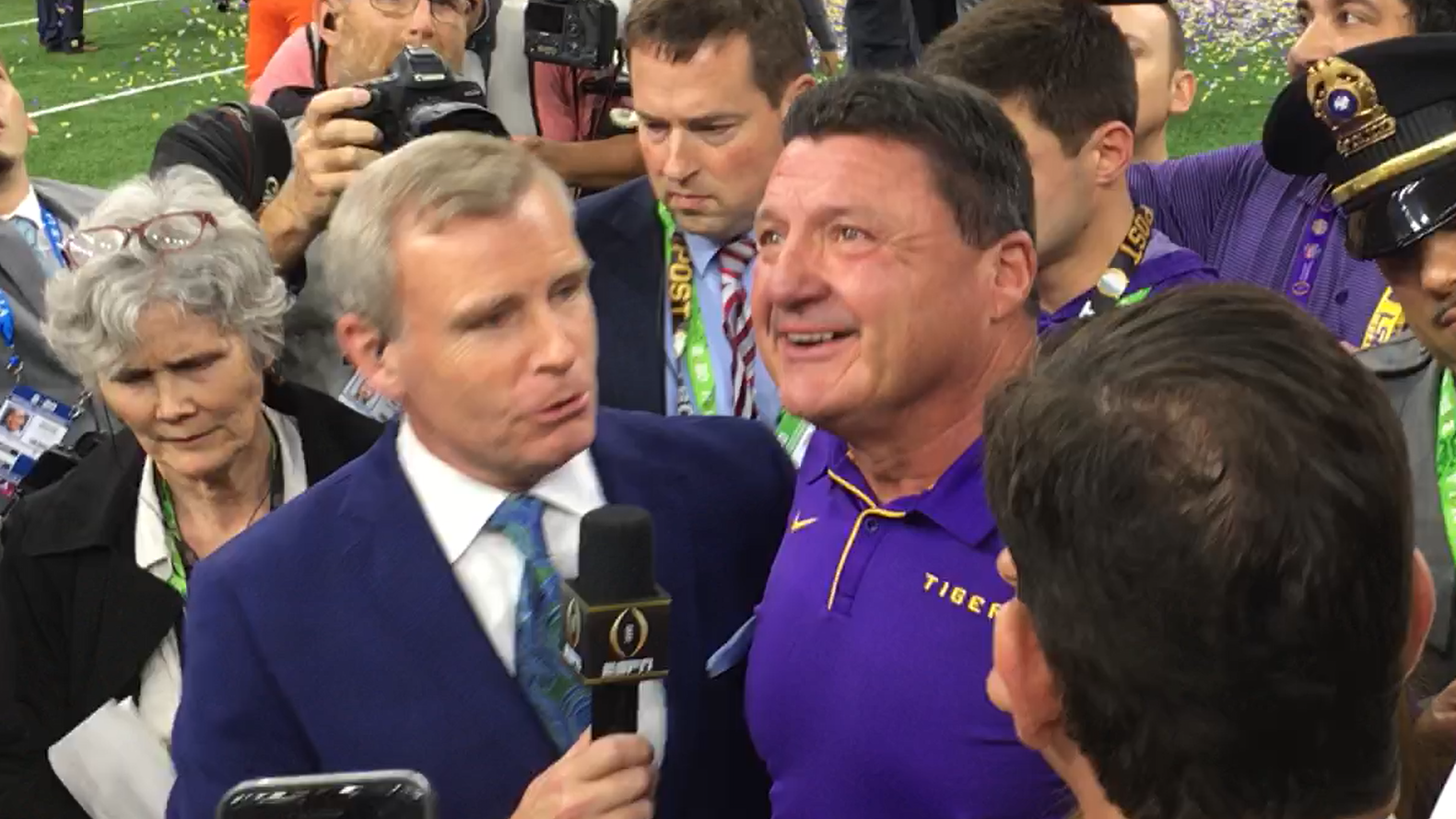
Orgeron during a post game interview with ESPN's Tom Rinaldi immediately after winning the 2020 College Football Playoff National Championship

After opening with a home win versus Georgia Southern, Orgeron's 2019 team recorded a statement road win over Texas in week two and proceeded to go undefeated through the regular season, including a 46–41 victory over Alabama at Bryant-Denny Stadium in Tuscaloosa. A win over Arkansas in the penultimate game of the regular season clinched the SEC West division title and secured a berth in the 2019 SEC Championship Game against Georgia. This was their first appearance in the SEC Championship Game since 2011. The traditionally defensive-minded Tigers averaged over 48 points per game, led by quarterback Joe Burrow, Baton Rouge-native running back Clyde Edwards-Helaire, and standout receivers Ja'Marr Chase and Justin Jefferson. Burrow set new LSU and SEC single-season records for passing yards with 4,366; his 44 touchdown passes set a new LSU record and tied the SEC mark. By the season's end, Burrow would go on set the NCAA single-season record for touchdown passes (60) en route to winning the Heisman Trophy. Orgeron's Tigers defeated the Georgia Bulldogs in the SEC Championship Game to win their first SEC title since 2011. On Sunday, December 8, 2019, they were named the No. 1 seed in the College Football Playoff. They met the Big 12 Conference champion Oklahoma Sooners in the semifinals in the Peach Bowl, defeating them by a score of 63–28.

Following the regular season, Orgeron was named the winner of the 2019 AP College Football Coach of the Year Award and Home Depot Coach of the Year Award. On January 13, 2020, Orgeron won his first national championship as a head coach with a win over the unbeaten defending national champion Clemson Tigers, 42–25, finishing the season 15–0. Orgeron and the LSU Tigers won the national title in their home state at the Mercedes-Benz Superdome in New Orleans.

==== 2020–2021 ====
LSU's 2020 season was shortened in response to the COVID-19 pandemic. They played a ten-game, all-SEC schedule. LSU started the season ranked No. 6 in the AP Poll, but dropped out of the rankings after three games and finished the season with a record of 5–5. The Tigers had three different starting quarterbacks throughout the course of the season. Myles Brennan started the first three games, but was injured during the game against Missouri on October 10 and was lost for the season. T. J. Finley started the next five games. Max Johnson started the final two games of the season. He led the Tigers to an upset win over the No. 6 Florida Gators in Gainesville and a shootout 53–48 win over Ole Miss in the season finale.

In March 2021, a woman testifying in front of Louisiana state legislators said that she had reported an instance of sexual harassment by LSU running back Derrius Guice to Orgeron, but that the coach had taken no action against him, and in fact called the woman and asked her to forgive Guice. In June 2021, Orgeron was added as a defendant to a Title IX lawsuit against LSU, which alleges that the coach was told Guice had raped a student and did not report the allegation.

Despite high expectations and a favorable schedule, LSU stumbled to a 3–3 start in 2021, losing several games in which they were favored. Following the tumultuous start, Orgeron's Tigers were able to upend the No. 20-ranked Florida Gators 49–42 in a thrilling rivalry game matchup. Despite the victory, LSU administrators announced the following day, on October 17, 2021, that they had reached a mutual agreement for Orgeron to leave the program at the end of the 2021 season. Orgeron's last game was a last-second victory against Texas A&M at home, which allowed the Tigers to finish the season at 6–6 and become bowl eligible. Despite this, Orgeron announced shortly after the game that he would not coach in the bowl game, and that offensive line coach Brad Davis would be appointed interim coach. Brian Kelly was hired from Notre Dame as Orgeron's successor.

==== 2026–present ====
Orgeron at LSU in 2026

On May 20, 2026, Orgeron returned to LSU as special assistant to recruiting and defense under Lane Kiffin. Kiffin described Orgeron as bringing "tremendous value with his ability to recruit elite players nationally, but especially the impact he can have for us recruiting the great state of Louisiana." Kiffin and Orgeron served on Pete Carroll's staff at USC from 2001 to 2004. After Kiffin replaced Carroll as head coach of the Trojans in 2010, he brought Orgeron on as his defensive coordinator, defensive line coach, and recruiting coordinator. Orgeron later served as USC's interim head coach after Kiffin was fired five games into the 2013 season.

== In media ==
Orgeron appears as himself in the 2009 film The Blind Side recruiting Michael Oher. In 2005, Orgeron had won an intense recruiting battle for Oher. Director John Lee Hancock contacted Orgeron about playing himself, despite having been fired by Ole Miss prior to the filming of the movie. Orgeron agreed and impressed the filmmaker with his enthusiasm.

In 2006, Bruce Feldman, then a senior writer at ESPN The Magazine, was allowed in-depth access to the Ole Miss program for a book about the recruiting process at a big-time college football program. The result was 2007's Meat Market: Inside the Smash-Mouth World of College Football Recruiting, a book filled with anecdotes about Orgeron, which The New York Times described as "one of the most insightful books ever written about college football."

Orgeron was portrayed by Emmett Skilton in the TV series Young Rock, which is about actor and former wrestler Dwayne "The Rock" Johnson. Orgeron was Johnson's defensive line coach when Johnson played at Miami. Orgeron also appears as himself in the season 1 episode of Young Rock, Check Your Head.

== Personal life ==
Orgeron is known for his strong, gravelly, Cajun-accented voice, and intensity while coaching. In 2006, during his time at Ole Miss, he was parodied in an internet video titled "Colonel Reb is Cryin'".

Orgeron has been married and divorced twice. His first wife was Colleen Orgeron. He met his second wife, Kelly, on a blind date while at the 1996 Liberty Bowl. The couple have three boys. Upon returning to USC in 2010, Orgeron lived in a hotel across the street from the campus while his wife and children made their home in Louisiana. The pair divorced in 2020.

Orgeron is Catholic.

== Head coaching record ==
| Year | Team | Overall | Conference | Standing | Bowl/playoffs | Coaches^{#} | AP^{°} |
|---|---|---|---|---|---|---|---|
Ole Miss Rebels (Southeastern Conference) (2005–2007)
| 2005 | Ole Miss | 3–8 | 1–7 | T–5th (Western) | | | |
| 2006 | Ole Miss | 4–8 | 2–6 | T–4th (Western) | | | |
| 2007 | Ole Miss | 3–9 | 0–8 | 6th (Western) | | | |
| Ole Miss: | | 10–25 | 3–21 | | | | |
USC Trojans (Pac-12 Conference) (2013)
| 2013 | USC | 6–2 | 6–1 | T–2nd (South) | | | |
| USC: | | 6–2 | 6–1 | | | | |
LSU Tigers (Southeastern Conference) (2016–2021)
| 2016 | LSU | 6–2 | 4–2 | T–2nd (Western) | W Citrus | 14 | 13 |
| 2017 | LSU | 9–4 | 6–2 | 3rd (Western) | L Citrus | 18 | 18 |
| 2018 | LSU | 10–3 | 5–3 | T–2nd (Western) | W Fiesta^{†} | 7 | 6 |
| 2019 | LSU | 15–0 | 8–0 | 1st (Western) | W Peach^{†}, W CFP NCG^{†} | 1 | 1 |
| 2020 | LSU | 5–5 | 5–5 | 4th (Western) | | | |
| 2021 | LSU | 6–6 | 3–5 | T–6th (Western) | Texas (Note: Did not coach bowl game) | | |
| LSU: | | 51–20 | 31–17 | | | | |
| Total: | | 67–47 | | | | | |
National championship Conference title Conference division title or championship game berth
^{†}Indicates Bowl Coalition, Bowl Alliance, BCS, or CFP / New Years' Six bowl.; ^{#}Rankings from final Coaches Poll.; ^{°}Rankings from final AP Poll.
