= Steve Ensminger =

American football player and coach (born 1958)

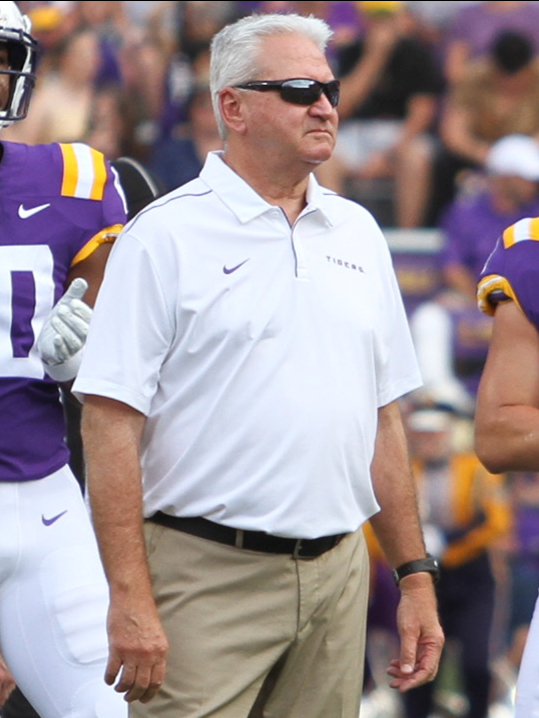
- Ensminger in 2019

Biographical details
- Born: September 15, 1958 (age 68); Baton Rouge, Louisiana, U.S.
- Education: Louisiana State University (1982)

Playing career
- 1976–1979: LSU
- 1980: New Orleans Saints
- 1980: Hamilton Tiger Cats
- 1981: Philadelphia Eagles
- Position: Quarterback

Coaching career (HC unless noted)
- 1982–1983: Nicholls State (WR)
- 1984–1986: McNeese State (OC/QB)
- 1988–1990: Louisiana Tech (OC/QB)
- 1991–1993: Georgia (QB/PGC)
- 1994–1996: Texas A&M (OC/QB)
- 1997–1998: Clemson (OC/QB)
- 2000–2002: Central HS (LA) (HC/AD)
- 2002: West Monroe HS (LA) (WR)
- 2003: Auburn (QB)
- 2004–2008: Auburn (TE)
- 2008: Auburn (interim OC)
- 2009: Smiths Station HS (AL) (PGC)
- 2010–2016: LSU (TE)
- 2016: LSU (interim OC/QB)
- 2017: LSU (TE)
- 2018–2020: LSU (OC/QB)

Steve Ensminger (born September 15, 1958) is an American college football coach and former player.

== Early years and playing career ==
Ensminger was born in Baton Rouge, Louisiana and attended Louisiana State University (LSU). He played quarterback for the LSU Tigers from 1976 to 1979. During his career at LSU, he threw for 2,770 yards and 16 touchdowns and was named a freshman All-Southeastern Conference (SEC) selection in 1976. Following college, he played quarterback in the National Football League (NFL) for the New Orleans Saints in 1980 and Philadelphia Eagles in 1981. He also played for the Hamilton Tiger Cats in the Canadian Football League (CFL) in 1980.

== Coaching career ==
Ensminger began his coaching career at Nicholls State University as a wide receivers coach from 1982 to 1983. From 1984 to 1986 at McNeese State University and at Louisiana Tech University from 1988 to 1990, he was offensive coordinator and quarterbacks coach. Starting in 1991 until 1993, he was quarterback coach and passing game coordinator at Georgia. From 1994 to 1996, Ensminger was offensive coordinator/quarterback coach at Texas A&M and then at Clemson from 1997 to 1998. Starting in 2000, Ensminger moved to the high school ranks as head football coach and athletic director at Central High School in Central, Louisiana, until 2002. Also in 2002, he was wide receiver coach at West Monroe High School in West Monroe, Louisiana. In 2003, Ensminger became quarterback coach at Auburn University and from 2004 to 2008 he was the tight end coach at Auburn. In 2008, Ensminger also served as interim offensive coordinator after Auburn's offensive coordinator was let go during the season. In 2009, he returned to high school as the passing game coordinator at Smiths Station High School in Smiths Station, Alabama.

Starting in 2010, Ensminger returned to Louisiana as the tight ends coach at LSU. When head coach Les Miles was dismissed after the fourth game of the 2016 season, interim head coach Ed Orgeron promoted Ensminger to offensive coordinator and quarterback coach for the rest of the 2016 season. For the 2017 season, he returned to coaching tight ends. On January 10, 2018, Ensminger was again promoted to offensive coordinator and quarterbacks coach. LSU then went on to win the 2019 college football national championship.

== Personal life ==
Ensminger is currently married to his wife, Amy Gonzales Ensminger, and has three children. On December 28, 2019, Ensminger's daughter-in-law, broadcaster Carley Ann McCord, was killed in a plane crash in Lafayette, Louisiana, while traveling to cover the Peach Bowl in Atlanta.
