= Quartney Davis =

American football player (born 1998)

Profile
- Position: Wide receiver

Personal information
- Born: April 7, 1998 (age 28); Houston, Texas, U.S.
- Listed height: 6 ft 1 in (1.85 m)
- Listed weight: 201 lb (91 kg)

Career information
- High school: Langham Creek (Houston, Texas)
- College: Texas A&M
- NFL draft: 2020: undrafted

Career history
- Minnesota Vikings (2020)*; Indianapolis Colts (2021); Montreal Alouettes (2023)
- * Offseason or practice squad member only

Awards and highlights
- Grey Cup champion (2023)
- Stats at Pro Football Reference

Quartney Davis (born April 7, 1998) is an American professional football wide receiver. He played college football at Texas A&M. He has been a member of the Minnesota Vikings, Indianapolis Colts, and Montreal Alouettes.

== Early life ==
Davis attended Langham Creek High School in Houston, Texas. He committed to Texas A&M University to play college football.

== College career ==
Davis tore his ACL and redshirted his first year at Texas A&M in 2016. He returned from the injury in 2017 to play in eight games, but did not record any statistics. As a sophomore in 2018, he started 12 of 13 games and had 45 receptions for 585 yards and seven touchdowns. As a junior in 2019, he started nine of 10 games, recording 54 receptions for 616 yards and four touchdowns. One of those four touchdowns was a last second touchdown to help lead Texas A&M to a 7OT victory over the LSU Tigers After the 2019 season, Davis forwent his senior season and entered the 2020 NFL draft.

== Professional career ==
Pre-draft measurables
Height	Weight	Arm length	Hand span	Wingspan	40-yard dash	10-yard split	20-yard split	Vertical jump
6 ft 1 1/4 in (1.86 m)	201 lb (91 kg)	31 3/8 in (0.80 m)	9 1/2 in (0.24 m)	6 ft 3 3/4 in (1.92 m)	4.54 s	1.53 s	2.66 s	35.5 in (0.90 m)
All values from NFL Combine

=== Minnesota Vikings ===
Davis signed with the Minnesota Vikings as an undrafted free agent on April 27, 2020. He was placed on the active/non-football injury list at the start of training camp on July 28, 2020, and activated from the list six days later. Davis was waived by the Vikings during final roster cuts on September 5, 2020.

=== Indianapolis Colts ===
On January 10, 2021, Davis signed a reserve/futures contract with the Indianapolis Colts. He was waived/injured on August 17 and placed on injured reserve.

=== Montreal Alouettes ===
Davis was signed by the Montreal Alouettes of the Canadian Football League (CFL) on February 17, 2023. He was released on April 18, 2024.
