= Michael Divinity =

American gridiron football player (born 1997)

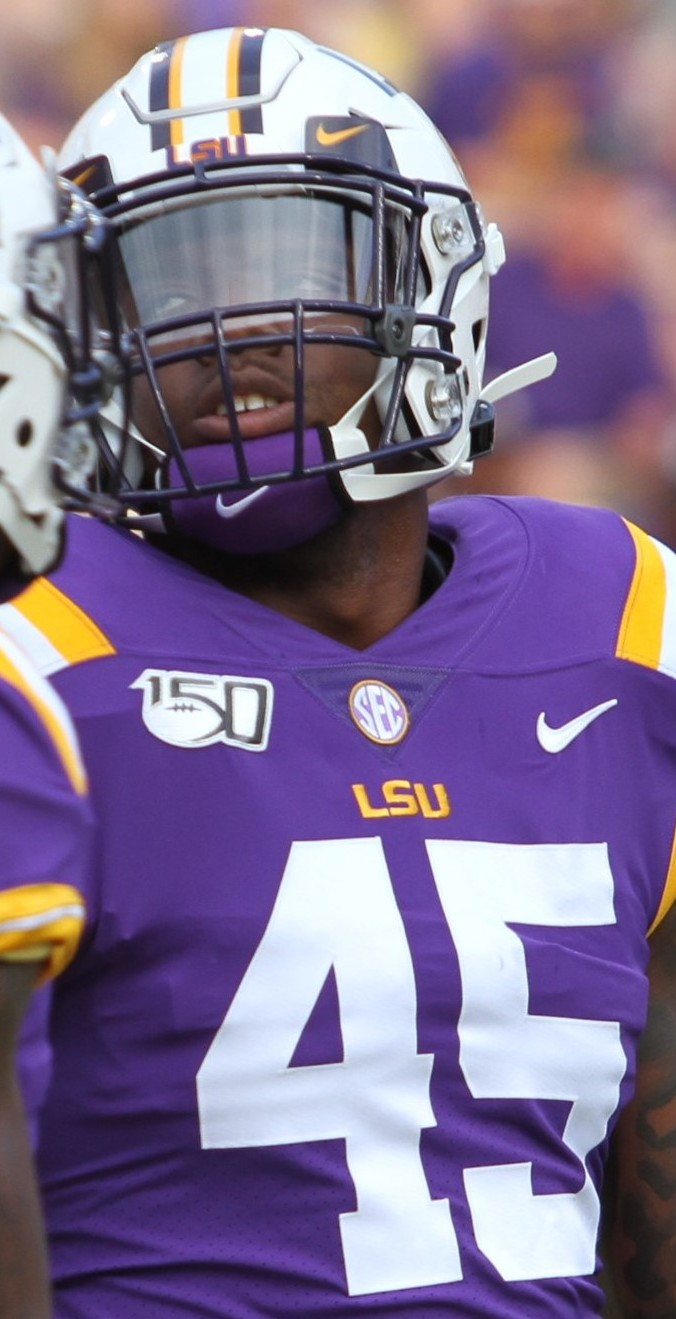
- Divinity with the LSU Tigers in 2019

No. 95
- Positions: Linebacker, defensive end

Personal information
- Born: May 13, 1997 (age 29); Marrero, Louisiana, U.S.
- Listed height: 6 ft 2 in (1.88 m)
- Listed weight: 241 lb (109 kg)

Career information
- High school: John Ehret (Marrero, Louisiana)
- College: LSU
- NFL draft: 2020: undrafted

Career history
- Tampa Bay Buccaneers (2020)*; Seattle Seahawks (2020)*; BC Lions (2021)
- * Offseason or practice squad member only

Awards and highlights
- CFP national champion (2019)
- Stats at Pro Football Reference

Michael Divinity Jr. (born May 13, 1997) is an American former professional football linebacker. He played college football at LSU.

== Early life ==
Divinity played quarterback on the freshman team at John Curtis Christian High School. He transferred to John Ehret High School prior to his sophomore year and switched to defense. He helped the team to their first state championship game appearance in 30 years as a senior. Divinity earned All-America honors as a junior and a senior. He was considered to be a five-star prospect that was ranked the nation's No. 6 outside linebacker and the No. 64 prospect overall by 247Sports. Divinity committed to LSU over offers from Alabama, Texas A&M, Michigan, Florida, Texas, and Florida State, among others.

== College career ==
Divinity played as a true freshman in 2016 and made his first start in 2017 against Notre Dame in the Citrus Bowl. As a junior in 2018, Divinity started 11 of 12 games and finished with 54 tackles including 9.5 tackles for loss, a team-high-tying five sacks, eight quarterback hurries, one interception, one forced fumble and two fumble recoveries. He posted a career-high 10 tackles and a sack in the big win at Texas early in his senior year. However, Divinity served a two-game suspension, missed a game with an injury, and then had a six-game suspension for another violation of team and university rules regarding marijuana use. As a result of the suspensions, he left the team but returned to practice on November 18. He was cleared to play in the National Championship Game. During his senior season, Divinity finished with 23 tackles including four for loss and 3.0 sacks. In his career, he posted 104 tackles (50 solo), nine sacks, two forced fumbles, and an interception.

Divinity performed poorly in NFL combine measurements. He tied for second to last at linebacker with 14 repetitions on the 225-pound bench press. He ran a 4.85 40-yard dash that was the fourth slowest for a linebacker, and his 31-inch vertical and 9-foot, 7-inch broad jump were also tied for the fourth worst at the combine.

== Professional career ==
=== Tampa Bay Buccaneers ===
After going undrafted in the 2020 NFL draft, Divinity signed an undrafted free agent deal with the Tampa Bay Buccaneers. He was waived on September 5, 2020.

=== Seattle Seahawks ===
On October 7, 2020, Divinity was signed by the Seattle Seahawks to their practice squad. He was released on November 3.

=== BC Lions ===
Divinity signed with the BC Lions of the CFL on June 10, 2021. He was placed on the suspended list on July 2. On September 20, he was added to the main roster. Divinity dressed in four games, starting one, for the Lions during the 2021 season. He was listed as a defensive end during his time with the Lions. He was released on February 16, 2022.

== Personal life ==
He is the oldest of four children of Leslie Gilmore and Michael Divinity Sr. His mother is a teacher's assistant and his father is a produce manager at a Winn-Dixie. In November 2015, the family home in Marrero, Louisiana was ransacked during the foreclosure process. Divinity has a daughter.
