= Nick Brossette =

American football player (born 1996)

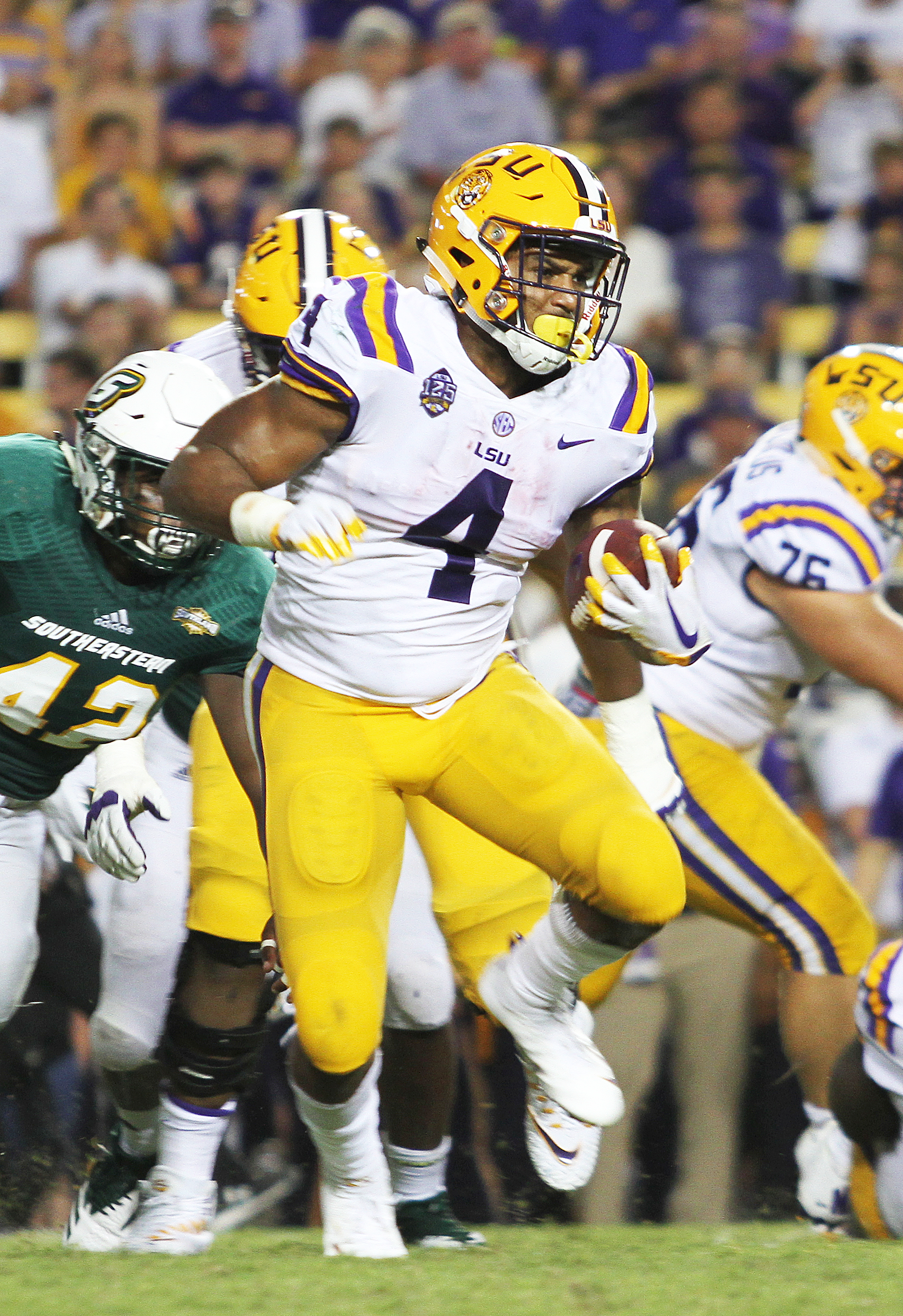
- Brossette with LSU in 2018

No. 4
- Position: Running back

Personal information
- Born: March 2, 1996 (age 30); Baton Rouge, Louisiana, U.S.
- Listed height: 5 ft 11 in (1.80 m)
- Listed weight: 210 lb (95 kg)

Career information
- High school: University (Baton Rouge)
- College: LSU
- NFL draft: 2019: undrafted

Career history

Playing
- New England Patriots (2019)*; Detroit Lions (2019)*; DC Defenders (2020)
- * Offseason or practice squad member only

Operations
- LSU (2022–2024) Director of Alumni Relations
- Stats at Pro Football Reference

Nick Brossette (born March 2, 1996) is an American former professional football player who was a running back in the National Football League (NFL). He played college football for the LSU Tigers. He played for the DC Defenders of the XFL in 2020.

== Early life ==
Brossette was a 4-star recruit from University High School in Baton Rouge, Louisiana. He committed to LSU on August 23, 2013.

== College career ==
During his freshman, sophomore, and junior seasons, Brossette did not see much playing time due to competition from Leonard Fournette and Derrius Guice. During his senior season, he ran for 1,039 yards and 14 touchdowns.

== Professional career ==
Pre-draft measurables
Height	Weight	Arm length	Hand span	40-yard dash	10-yard split	20-yard split	20-yard shuttle	Three-cone drill	Vertical jump	Broad jump	Bench press
5 ft 11 1/8 in (1.81 m)	209 lb (95 kg)	30 in (0.76 m)	8 5/8 in (0.22 m)	4.72 s	1.55 s	2.69 s	4.44 s	7.38 s	35.5 in (0.90 m)	9 ft 10 in (3.00 m)	15 reps
All values from NFL Combine

=== New England Patriots ===
After going undrafted in the 2019 NFL draft, the New England Patriots signed Brossette as an undrafted free agent on April 29, 2019. During his preseason debut against the Detroit Lions, he ran for 66 yards and a touchdown. Brossette finished the preseason with 200 rushing yards and three touchdowns. He was waived by the Patriots on August 31.

=== Detroit Lions ===
Brossette was signed to the Detroit Lions' practice squad on September 12, 2019. He was later released that same day, and was subsequently re-signed by the team on September 18. Brossette was released by the Lions again on September 24.

=== DC Defenders ===
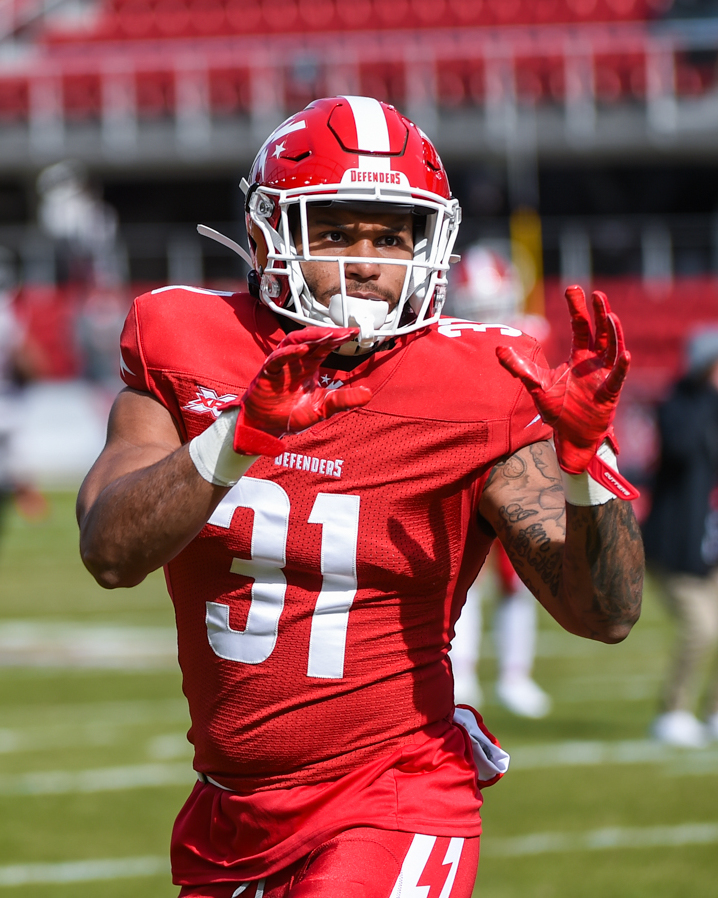
Brossette with the DC Defenders

Brossette was signed by the DC Defenders of the XFL during mini-camp in December 2019. He rushed for 75 yards and his first XFL touchdown against the Los Angeles Wildcats on February 23, 2020. He finished the season with 87 rushing yards. He had his contract terminated when the league suspended operations on April 10.

== Post-playing career ==
Brossette was the Director of Alumni relations at LSU from 2022 to 2024.
