= 2019 LSU Tigers football team =

American college football season

2019 LSU Tigers football

Consensus national champion SEC champion SEC Western Division champion Peach Bowl champion

SEC Championship Game, W 37–10 vs. Georgia

Peach Bowl (CFP Semifinal), W 63–28 vs. Oklahoma CFP National Championship, W 42–25 vs. Clemson
- Conference: Southeastern Conference
- West Division

Ranking
- Coaches: No. 1
- AP: No. 1
- Record: 15–0 (8–0 SEC)
- Head coach: Ed Orgeron (3rd season)
- Offensive coordinator: Steve Ensminger (2nd season)
- Offensive scheme: Pro Spread
- Defensive coordinator: Dave Aranda (4th season)
- Base defense: 3–4
- Home stadium: Tiger Stadium

Uniform
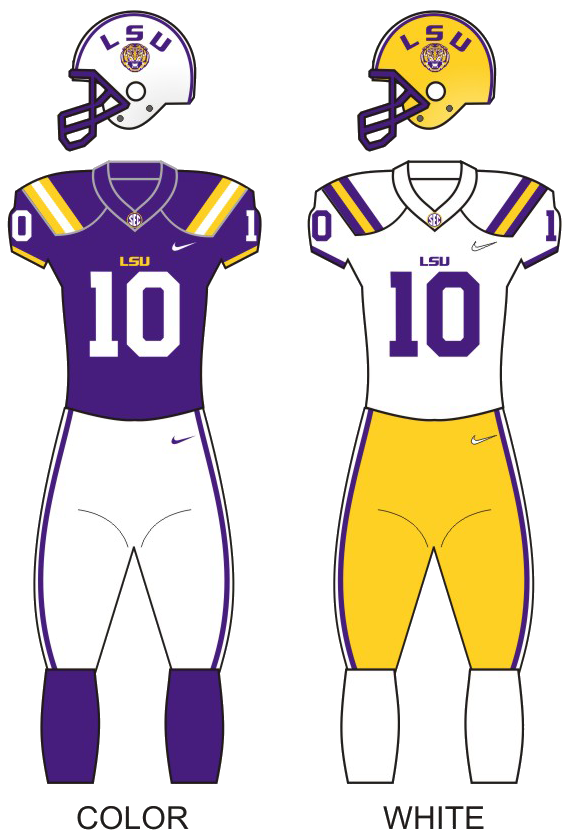

2019 Southeastern Conference football standings
	Conf.			Overall
Team	W		L	W		L
Eastern Division
No. 4 Georgia x	7	–	1	12	–	2
No. 6 Florida	6	–	2	11	–	2
Tennessee *	5	–	3	8	–	5
Kentucky	3	–	5	8	–	5
Missouri *	3	–	5	6	–	6
South Carolina	3	–	5	4	–	8
Vanderbilt	1	–	7	3	–	9
Western Division
No. 1 LSU x$#^	8	–	0	15	–	0
No. 8 Alabama	6	–	2	11	–	2
No. 14 Auburn	5	–	3	9	–	4
Texas A&M	4	–	4	8	–	5
Mississippi State	3	–	5	6	–	7
Ole Miss	2	–	6	4	–	8
Arkansas	0	–	8	2	–	10
Championship: LSU 37, Georgia 10
# – College Football Playoff champion; ^ – College Football Playoff participant; $ – Conference champion; x – Division champion/co-champions; * – Tennessee vacated all wins due to NCAA violations. Missouri was ineligible for postseason due to NCAA sanctions.; Rankings from AP Poll

The 2019 LSU Tigers football team represented Louisiana State University in the 2019 NCAA Division I FBS football season. The Tigers played their home games at Tiger Stadium (nicknamed Death Valley) in Baton Rouge, Louisiana, and competed in the West Division of the Southeastern Conference (SEC) where they were led by their third-year head coach Ed Orgeron. Many experts and fans have claimed that the 2019 LSU Tigers were the greatest college football team of the modern era. The team recorded seven wins over top-10 opponents (with an average margin of victory of 20 points against four top-5 teams) and benefited from the later NFL success of Joe Burrow, Justin Jefferson, and Ja'Marr Chase (Burrow finished 1st in NFL passing yards in 2024, and Chase finished 1st in WR reception yards while Jefferson finished 2nd in WR reception yards).

LSU began the year ranked sixth in the preseason AP Poll, and were projected to finish second in the SEC West behind Alabama. The Tigers secured an undefeated regular season that included wins over top-ten-ranked teams Texas, Florida, Auburn, and Alabama. In the SEC Championship Game, LSU defeated Georgia to win their first conference title since 2011. LSU was ranked No. 1 in the final College Football Playoff rankings of the season, earning them a spot in the national semi-final game to be played at the Peach Bowl. They dominated fourth-ranked Oklahoma in that game, 63–28, to advance to the CFP Championship Game. There, they defeated the defending national champions Clemson, 42–25, to secure LSU's fourth national title in school history, the second undefeated champion in the CFP era, and the second 15–0 season among any team in the modern era.

LSU's record-setting offense was led by senior quarterback Joe Burrow, who won the Heisman Trophy by the largest margin in the history of the award, and broke several NCAA FBS records, including most touchdown passes (60), and highest quarterback rating (202.0). He was accompanied on offense by 1,400-yard running back Clyde Edwards-Helaire, and two 1,500-yard receivers and future multi-time NFL Pro Bowlers, Ja'Marr Chase and Justin Jefferson, with the former winning the Biletnikoff Award as the best wide receiver in the country. The Tigers' offensive line won the Joe Moore Award as the nation's best offensive line unit. LSU's defense was anchored by two All-American defensive backs in Jim Thorpe Award winner Grant Delpit and true freshman Derek Stingley Jr. Linebacker Jacob Phillips led the SEC in tackles. Head coach Ed Orgeron was awarded several national Coach of the Year honors.

On the season, the Tigers outscored their opponents by a combined total of 726 to 328. Owing to their dominant performance against a historically difficult schedule, several pundits have called the team one of the greatest in college football history.

== Preseason ==
=== SEC media poll ===
The SEC media poll was released on July 19, 2019, with the Tigers predicted to finish in second place in the West Division.

== Schedule ==
LSU announced its 2019 football schedule on September 18, 2018. The 2019 schedule consisted of 7 home and 5 away games in the regular season.

Date	Time	Opponent	Rank	Site	TV	Result	Attendance
August 31	6:30 p.m.	Georgia Southern*	No. 6	Tiger Stadium; Baton Rouge, LA	SECN	W 55–3	97,420
September 7	6:30 p.m.	at No. 9 Texas*	No. 6	Darrell K Royal–Texas Memorial Stadium; Austin, TX (College GameDay)	ABC	W 45–38	98,763
September 14	6:30 p.m.	Northwestern State*	No. 4	Tiger Stadium; Baton Rouge, LA	SECN	W 65–14	100,334
September 21	11:00 a.m.	at Vanderbilt	No. 4	Vanderbilt Stadium; Nashville, TN	SECN	W 66–38	32,048
October 5	11:00 a.m.	Utah State*	No. 5	Tiger Stadium; Baton Rouge, LA	SECN	W 42–6	100,266
October 12	7:00 p.m.	No. 7 Florida^{†}	No. 5	Tiger Stadium; Baton Rouge, LA (rivalry / College GameDay)	ESPN	W 42–28	102,321
October 19	2:30 p.m.	at Mississippi State	No. 2	Davis Wade Stadium; Starkville, MS (rivalry / SEC Nation)	CBS	W 36–13	59,282
October 26	2:30 p.m.	No. 9 Auburn	No. 2	Tiger Stadium; Baton Rouge, LA (Tiger Bowl / SEC Nation)	CBS	W 23–20	102,160
November 9	2:30 p.m.	at No. 3 Alabama	No. 2	Bryant–Denny Stadium; Tuscaloosa, AL (rivalry / College GameDay / SEC Nation)	CBS	W 46–41	101,821
November 16	6:00 p.m.	at Ole Miss	No. 1	Vaught–Hemingway Stadium; Oxford, MS (Magnolia Bowl / SEC Nation)	ESPN	W 58–37	53,797
November 23	6:00 p.m.	Arkansas	No. 1	Tiger Stadium; Baton Rouge, LA (Battle for the Golden Boot)	ESPN	W 56–20	101,173
November 30	6:00 p.m.	Texas A&M	No. 2	Tiger Stadium; Baton Rouge, LA (rivalry)	ESPN	W 50–7	102,218
December 7	3:00 p.m.	vs. No. 4 Georgia	No. 2	Mercedes-Benz Stadium; Atlanta, GA (SEC Championship Game / College GameDay / SEC Nation)	CBS	W 37–10	74,150
December 28	3:00 p.m.	vs. No. 4 Oklahoma*	No. 1	Mercedes-Benz Stadium; Atlanta, GA (Peach Bowl – CFP Semifinal / SEC Nation)	ESPN	W 63–28	78,347
January 13, 2020	7:00 p.m.	vs. No. 3 Clemson*	No. 1	Mercedes-Benz Superdome; New Orleans, LA (CFP National Championship / College GameDay / SEC Nation)	ESPN	W 42–25	76,885
*Non-conference game; ^{†}Homecoming; Rankings from AP Poll and CFP Rankings (after November 5) released prior to game; All times are in Central time

Schedule source:

== Roster ==
2019 LSU Tigers football team roster
Players
Coaches
Offense

Pos.	#	Name	Class
WR	1	Ja'Marr Chase	So
WR	2	Justin Jefferson	Jr
QB	3	AJ Aycock	Fr
RB	3	Tyrion Davis-Price	Fr
RB	4	John Emery Jr.	Fr
WR	5	Devonta Lee	Fr
WR	6	Terrace Marshall Jr.	Jr
QB	8	Peter Parrish	Fr
QB	9	Joe Burrow	Sr
TE	10	Stephen Sullivan	Sr
QB	12	Walker Kinney	Fr
WR	13	Jontre Kirklin	Jr
QB	14	John Gordon McKernan	Fr
QB	15	Myles Brennan	So
WR	17	Racey McMath	Jr
WR	19	Derrick Dillon	Sr
RB	22	Clyde Edwards-Helaire	Jr
RB	23	Corren Norman	Fr
RB	24	Chris Curry	Fr
RB	25	Josh Williams	Fr
RB	26	Keenen Dunn	So
TE	30	Jack Mashburn	Fr
WR	31	Thomas McGoey	Fr
WR	33	Trey Palmer	Fr
TE	42	Aaron Moffitt	So
FB	44	Tory Carter	Jr
TE	45	Stephen King	Fr
TE	49	Jansen Mayea	Fr
OT	51	Dare Rosenthal	Fr
G	57	Chasen Hines	So
OL	58	Kardell Thomas	Fr
OT	61	Cameron Wire	Fr
OL	63	Michael Smith	Jr
OL	64	Austin Harden	Fr
OL	65	Jakori Savage	Jr
G	68	Damien Lewis	Sr
OL	69	Charles Turner	Fr
G	70	Ed Ingram	So
OL	71	Donavaughn Campbell	Jr
OL	73	Adrian Magee	Sr
OT	74	Badara Traore	Sr
OL	75	Anthony Bradford	Fr
OL	76	Austin Deculus	Jr
OT	77	Saahdiq Charles	Jr
OL	78	Thomas Perry	Fr
C	79	Lloyd Cushenberry	Jr
TE	80	Jamal Pettigrew	Jr
TE	81	Thaddeus Moss	Jr
TE	82	Brandon Hubicz	Fr
WR	83	Jaray Jenkins	Fr
WR	85	Michael Martin	Fr
WR	87	Evan Francioni	Fr
WR	88	Alex Aucoin	Fr
WR	89	Colby Brunet	Jr

Defense

Pos.	#	Name	Class
CB	1	Kristian Fulton	Sr
S	3	JaCoby Stevens	Jr
S	4	Todd Harris Jr.	Jr
S	5	Kary Vincent Jr.	Jr
LB	6	Jacob Phillips	Jr
S	7	Grant Delpit	Jr
LB	8	Patrick Queen	Jr
S	9	Marcel Brooks	Fr
S	11	Eric Monroe	Jr
LB	12	Donte Starks	Fr
S	14	Maurice Hampton Jr.	Fr
CB	16	Jay Ward	Fr
LB	18	K'Lavon Chaisson	So
S	22	Zaven Fountain	Fr
LB	23	Micah Baskerville	So
CB	24	Derek Stingley Jr.	Fr
CB	25	Cordale Flott	Fr
CB	29	Raydarious Jones	Fr
DB	30	Cade Comeaux	Fr
S	31	Cameron Lewis	Jr
CB	34	Lloyd Cole	Jr
LB	35	Damone Clark	So
LB	41	Carlton Smith	So
LB	42	Hunter Faust	Fr
LB	43	Ray Thornton	Jr
LB	44	Dylan Thompson	Fr
LB	45	Michael Divinity	Sr
LB	46	Andre Anthony	Jr
DL	47	Nelson Jenkins III	Fr
DE	49	Travez Moore	Jr
LB	52	Tayte Langley	Fr
LB	53	Soni Fonua	Jr
LB	54	Aaron Benfield	Fr
DE	55	Jarell Cherry	Fr
LB	58	Jared Small	So
LB	59	Desmond Little	Fr
DT	62	Siaki Ika	Fr
DT	72	Tyler Shelvin	So
DE	84	T. K. McLendon	Jr
LB	85	Ray Parker	Fr
DL	90	Rashard Lawrence	Sr
DL	91	Breiden Fehoko	Sr
DL	92	Neil Farrell Jr.	Jr
DE	93	Justin Thomas	Jr
DL	94	Joseph Evans	Fr
DE	97	Glen Logan	Jr

Special teams

Pos.	#	Name	Class
K	32	Avery Atkins	So
K	36	Cade York	Fr
P	38	Zach Von Rosenberg	Jr
K	39	Mason Burns	Fr
K	43	Connor Culp	Jr
K	43	Preston Stafford	Fr
LS	47	Quentin Skinner	Fr
LS	48	Blake Ferguson	Sr

Head coach

- Ed Orgeron

Coordinators/assistant coaches

- Dave Aranda – Associate head coach/defensive coordinator/linebackers
- Joe Brady – Passing game coordinator/receivers coach
- Bill Busch – Safeties
- James Cregg – Offensive line
- Steve Ensminger – Offensive coordinator/quarterbacks
- Bill Johnson – Defensive line
- Mickey Joseph – Wide receivers
- Greg McMahon – Special teams coordinator
- Corey Raymond – Cornerbacks
- Kevin Cosgrove – Lead defensive analyst
- Dennis Johnson – Analyst
- Tommie Robinson – Assistant head coach/recruiting coordinator/running backs
- Tommy Moffitt – Assistant athletic director/strength and conditioning
- Dr. Sam Nader – Assistant Athletic Director – Football
- Sharon Lewis – Assistant athletic director/football recruiting and alumni relations
- Kevin Faulk – Director, player development
- Derek Ponamsky – Special assistant to the head coach
- John Robinson – Senior Consultant

Legend

- (C) Team captain
- (S) Suspended
- (I) Ineligible
- Injured
- Redshirt

Roster

=== Depth chart ===
Defense

FS
Grant Delpit
Cameron Lewis
⋅

OUTSIDE	INSIDE	INSIDE	OUTSIDE
Patrick Queen	Jacob Phillips	Damone Clark	K'Lavon Chaisson
Ray Thornton	Micah Baskerville	Michael Divinity	Andre Anthony
⋅	⋅	⋅	⋅

SS
JaCoby Stevens
Kary Vincent Jr.
⋅

CB
Kristian Fulton
Cordale Flott
⋅

DE	NT	DE
Neil Farrell Jr.	Tyler Shelvin	Rashard Lawrence
Glen Logan	Siaki Ika	Breiden Fehoko
⋅	⋅	⋅

CB
Derek Stingley Jr.
Jay Ward
⋅

Offense

WR
Ja'Marr Chase
Racey McMath
⋅

WR
Terrace Marshall Jr.
Derrick Dillon
Trey Palmer

LT	LG	C	RG	RT
Saahdiq Charles	Adrian Magee	Lloyd Cushenberry	Damien Lewis	Austin Deculus
Dare Rosenthal	Chasen Hines	Charles Turner	Donavaughn Campbell	Badara Traore
⋅	⋅	⋅	⋅	⋅

TE
Thaddeus Moss
Stephen Sullivan
Tory Carter

WR
Justin Jefferson
Jaray Jenkins
Jontre Kirklin

QB
Joe Burrow
Myles Brennan
⋅

Special teams

RB
Clyde Edwards-Helaire
Tyrion Davis-Price
Chris Curry
John Emery

== Coaching staff ==
Current staff as of August 17, 2019

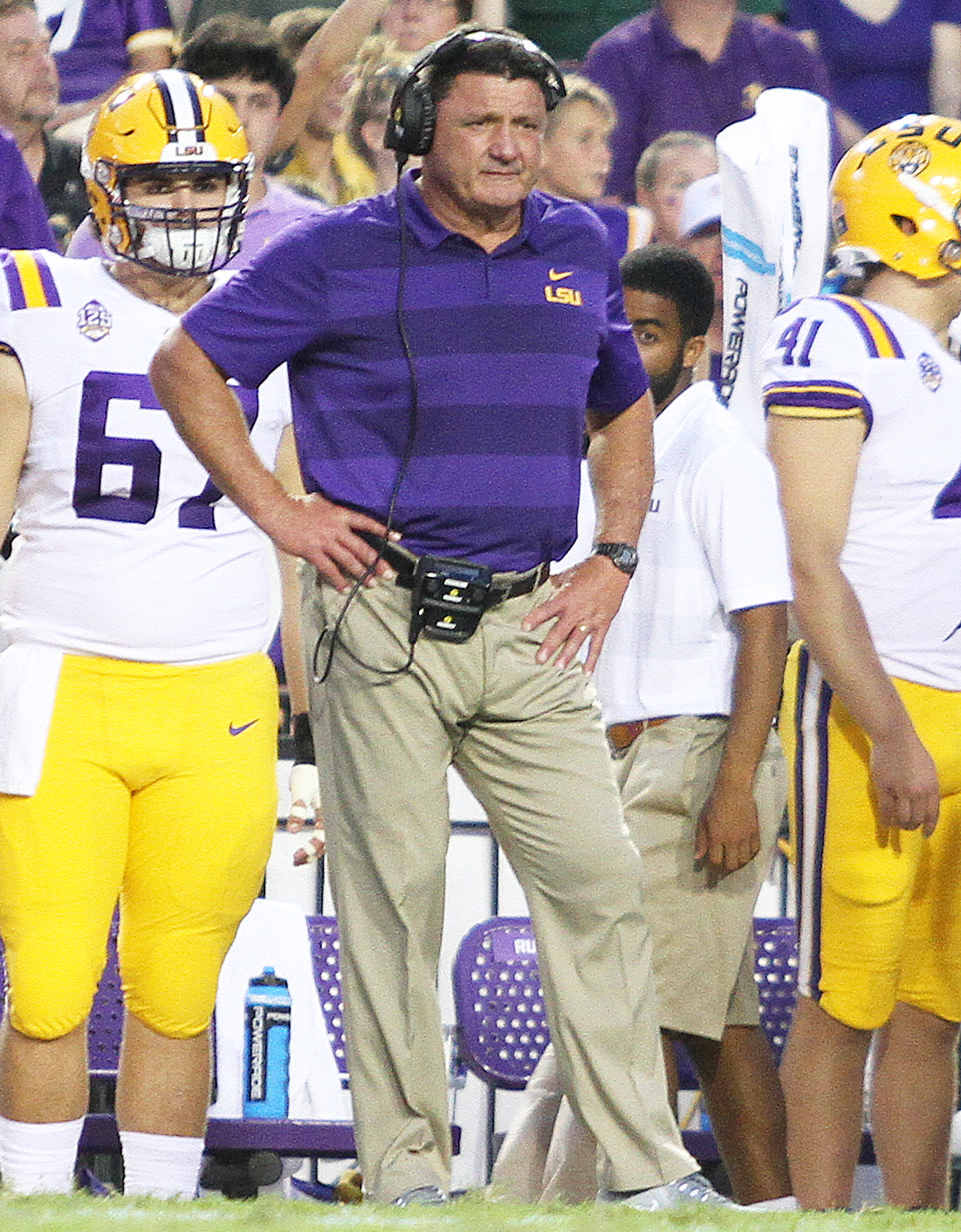
Head coach Ed Orgeron

Name	Position
Ed Orgeron	Head coach
Steve Ensminger	Offensive coordinator/quarterbacks coach
Dave Aranda	Defensive coordinator/linebackers coach/associate head coach
Joe Brady	Passing game coordinator/wide receivers coach
James Cregg	Offensive line coach/running game coordinator
Mickey Joseph	Wide receivers coach
Tommie Robinson	Running backs coach/assistant head coach/recruiting coordinator
Bill Johnson	Defensive line coach
Corey Raymond	Cornerbacks coach
Bill Busch	Safeties coach
Greg McMahon	Special teams coordinator
Tommy Moffitt	Strength and conditioning coordinator
John Robinson	Senior consultant

== Game summaries ==
=== Georgia Southern ===
Georgia Southern Eagles at No. 6 LSU Tigers – Game summary

Quarter	1	2	3	4	Total
Eagles	0	3	0	0	3
No. 6 Tigers	21	21	10	3	55

at Tiger Stadium, Baton Rouge, Louisiana

- Date: August 31
- Game time: 6:30 p.m. CDT
- Game attendance: 97,420
- TV announcers (SECN): Mike Couzens, Kirk Morrison and Edward Aschoff

Game information

First quarter

- LSU – Ja'Marr Chase 13-yard pass from Joe Burrow (Cade York kick), 12:36. Tigers 7–0. Drive: 6 plays, 75 yards, 2:24.
- LSU – Clyde Edwards-Helaire 1-yard run (Cade York kick), 8:10. Tigers 14–0. Drive: 6 plays, 34 yards, 2:13.
- LSU – Justin Jefferson 9-yard pass from Joe Burrow (Cade York kick), 3:09. Tigers 21–0. Drive: 10 plays, 52 yards, 3:50.

Second quarter

- LSU – Terrace Marshall Jr. 8-yard pass from Joe Burrow (Cade York kick), 13:10. Tigers 28–0. Drive: 5 plays, 26 yards, 2:02.
- LSU – Terrace Marshall Jr. 3-yard pass from Joe Burrow (Cade York kick), 9:58. Tigers 35–0. Drive: 4 plays, 25 yards, 1:19.
- GASO – Tyler Bass 47-yard field goal, 5:13. Tigers 35–3. Drive: 10 plays, 45 yards, 4:45.
- LSU – Terrace Marshall Jr. 11-yard pass from Joe Burrow (Cade York kick), 0:58. Tigers 42–3. Drive: 5 plays, 80 yards, 1:24.

Third quarter

- LSU – Cade York 39-yard field goal, 10:48. Tigers 45–3. Drive: 7 plays, 44 yards, 2:36.
- LSU – Lanard Fournette 2-yard run (Cade York kick), 5:47. Tigers 52–3. Drive: 9 plays, 59 yards, 3:47.

Fourth quarter

- LSU – Cade York 48-yard field goal, 10:58. Tigers 55–3. Drive: 7 plays, 16 yards, 4:02.

Top passers

- GASO – Justin Tomlin – 3/8, 24 yards
- LSU – Joe Burrow – 23/27, 278 yards, 5 TD

Top rushers

- GASO – Logan Wright – 13 rushes, 37 yards
- LSU – Clyde Edwards-Helaire – 9 rushes, 45 yards, TD

Top receivers

- GASO – Khaleb Hood – 1 reception, 12 yards
- LSU – Justin Jefferson – 5 receptions, 87 yards, TD

LSU opened the 2019 season with a home non-conference game against Georgia Southern of the Sun Belt Conference. LSU won in a rout, 55–3.

LSU received the opening kick-off, and scored touchdowns on each of their first five possessions. In the first quarter, the Tigers scored via a 13-yard pass from Joe Burrow to Ja'Marr Chase, a one-yard run by Clyde Edwards-Helaire, and a nine-yard pass from Burrow to Justin Jefferson. To start the second quarter, they scored with two touchdown passes from Burrow to Terrace Marshall Jr., first from eight yards out and then from three yards out. Georgia Southern converted a 47-yard field goal with 5:13 left in the second quarter for their only points of the day. In the final minute of the first half, Burrow threw his fifth touchdown pass of the day, and third to Marshall Jr., from 11 yards out. This tied the LSU school record for single-game touchdown passes. Burrow was given one possession at the start of the second half to try and break the record, but the drive ended in a 39-yard field goal, and Burrow sat the remainder of the game. Backup quarterback Myles Brennan led another touchdown drive in the third quarter, ending in a two-yard touchdown run by Lanard Fournette. In the fourth quarter, kicker Cade York converted a 48-yard field goal to end the scoring for the day.

Joe Burrow, who completed 23 of 27 passes for 278 yards and five touchdowns in just over one half of play, was later named SEC Co-offensive Player of the Week (with Alabama's Tua Tagovailoa). Regarding LSU's upgraded offense, Burrow said after the game, "I wanted 60 tonight. We’ve definitely come out of the stone age."

=== At No. 9 Texas ===
No. 6 LSU Tigers at No. 9 Texas Longhorns – Game summary

Quarter	1	2	3	4	Total
No. 6 Tigers	3	17	3	22	45
No. 9 Longhorns	0	7	14	17	38

at Darrell K Royal–Texas Memorial Stadium, Austin, Texas

- Date: September 7, 2019
- Game time: 6:30 p.m. CDT
- Game weather: Sunny, 100 °F (38 °C)
- Game attendance: 98,763
- Referee: John McDaid
- TV announcers (ABC): Rece Davis, Kirk Herbstreit and Maria Taylor

Game information

First quarter

- LSU – Cade York 36-yard field goal, 8:04. Tigers 3–0. Drive: 11 plays, 71 yards, 4:58.

Second quarter

- TEX – Brennan Eagles 55-yard pass from Sam Ehlinger (Cameron Dicker kick), 10:29. Longhorns 7–3. Drive: 8 plays, 78 yards, 2:21.
- LSU – Justin Jefferson 6-yard pass from Joe Burrow (Cade York kick), 7:30. Tigers 10–7. Drive: 8 plays, 75 yards, 2:59.
- LSU – Cade York 33-yard field goal, 1:41. Tigers 13–7. Drive: 10 plays, 65 yards, 2:54.
- LSU – Justin Jefferson 21-yard pass from Joe Burrow (Cade York kick), 0:47. Tigers 20–7. Drive: 3 plays, 58 yards, 0:26.

Third quarter

- TEX – Sam Ehlinger 2-yard run (Cameron Dicker kick), 6:51. Tigers 20–14. Drive: 19 plays, 86 yards, 7:17.
- LSU – Cade York 40-yard field goal, 5:10. Tigers 23–14. Drive: 6 plays, 53 yards, 1:41.
- TEX – Jack Smith 20-yard pass from Sam Ehlinger (Cameron Dicker kick), 2:36. Tigers 23–21. Drive: 7 plays, 75 yards, 2:34.

Fourth quarter

- LSU – Terrace Marshall Jr. 26-yard pass from Joe Burrow (Cade York kick), 14:52. Tigers 30–21. Drive: 6 plays, 75 yards, 2:44.
- TEX – Devin Duvernay 44-yard pass from Sam Ehlinger (Cameron Dicker kick), 12:09. Tigers 30–28. Drive: 7 plays, 75 yards, 2:43.
- LSU – Clyde Edwards-Helaire 12-yard run (Cade York kick), 9:58. Tigers 37–28. Drive: 6 plays, 75 yards, 2:11.
- TEX – Cameron Dicker 47-yard field goal, 3:59. Tigers 37–31. Drive: 10 plays, 46 yards, 5:59.
- LSU – Justin Jefferson 61-yard pass from Joe Burrow (Joe Burrow pass to Ja'Marr Chase), 2:27. Tigers 45–31. Drive: 6 plays, 75 yards, 1:32.
- TEX – Devin Duvernay 15-yard pass from Sam Ehlinger (Cameron Dicker kick), 0:22. Tigers 45–38. Drive: 8 plays, 75 yards, 2:05.

Top passers

- LSU – Joe Burrow – 31/39, 471 yards, 4 TD, INT
- TEX – Sam Ehlinger – 31/47, 401 yards, 4 TD

Top rushers

- LSU – Clyde Edwards-Helaire – 15 rushes, 87 yards, TD
- TEX – Sam Ehlinger – 19 rushers, 60 yards, TD

Top receivers

- LSU – Justin Jefferson – 9 receptions, 163 yards, 3 TD
- TEX – Devin Duvernay – 12 receptions, 154 yards, 2 TD

LSU's next game was a non-conference road game against ninth-ranked Texas of the Big 12 Conference. The Tigers won in a shootout, 45–38.

After forcing a Texas three-and-out to open the game, LSU scored on its first offensive possession via a 36-yard field goal by Cade York. In the second quarter, Texas took the lead with a 55-yard touchdown pass from Sam Ehlinger to Brennan Eagles. LSU responded with a six-yard touchdown pass from Joe Burrow to Justin Jefferson. With 1:41 left in the half, LSU added three points with a 33-yard field goal. Texas was forced to punt on its next possession, and LSU scored another touchdown in the final minute of the half with a 21-yard pass from Burrow to Jefferson. The score was 20–7 LSU at half-time.

On Texas's first drive of the second half, they scored on a 19-play, 86-yard drive that ended with a two-yard run by Sam Ehlinger. This was the first of nine consecutive scoring possessions by the two teams. LSU scored next with a 40-yard field goal by York. Texas responded with a 20-yard touchdown pass from Ehlinger to Jake Smith to bring the score to 23–21 LSU. On the first play of the fourth quarter, LSU's Joe Burrow completed a 26-yard touchdown pass to Terrace Marshall Jr. Texas pulled within two points again when Ehlinger completed a 44-yard touchdown pass to Devin Duvernay. LSU extended the lead with a 12-yard touchdown run by Clyde Edwards-Helaire, and then held Texas to a field goal on their next possession. With 2:27 remaining in the game, LSU scored the game-sealing touchdown on 3rd and 17 from their own 39 yard line with a 61-yard pass from Burrow to Justin Jefferson, and converted a two-point try with a pass from Burrow to Ja'Marr Chase to make the score 45–31. Texas drove 75 yards in just over two minutes and pulled within a touchdown with a 15-yard pass from Ehlinger to Duvernay with 22 seconds remaining. Their ensuing onside kick attempt failed, and LSU kneeled out the remainder of the clock to win the game.

Joe Burrow completed 471 passing yards and four touchdowns in the game, and was named Walter Camp National Offensive Player of the Week and SEC Offensive Player of the Week. His 471 yards were the second most in school history and most since Rohan Davey threw for 528 against Alabama in 2001. Three Tiger players finished with more than 100 yards receiving, a school first: Justin Jefferson, Ja'Marr Chase, and Terrace Marshall Jr. Kicker Cade York, who was 3/3 on field goal attempts, was named SEC Special Teams Player of the Week.

=== Northwestern State ===
Northwestern State Demons at No. 4 LSU Tigers – Game summary

Quarter	1	2	3	4	Total
Demons	7	7	0	0	14
No. 4 Tigers	3	21	27	14	65

at Tiger Stadium, Baton Rouge, Louisiana

- Date: September 14
- Game time: 6:30 p.m. CDT
- Game weather: Clear, 98 °F (37 °C)
- Game attendance: 100,334
- TV announcers (SECN): Tom Hart, Jordan Rodgers and Cole Cubelic

Game information

First quarter

- LSU – Cade York 26-yard field goal, 5:30. Tigers 3–0. Drive: 10 plays, 57 yards, 4:19.
- NWST – Quan Shorts 17-yard pass from Shelton Eppler (Scotty Roblow kick), 0:16. Demons 7–3. Drive: 8 plays, 75 yards, 5:14.

Second quarter

- LSU – Clyde Edwards-Helaire 4-yard run (Cade York kick), 12:38. Tigers 10–7. Drive: 8 plays, 69 yards, 2:38.
- LSU – Terrace Marshall Jr. 14-yard pass from Joe Burrow (Cade York kick), 8:50. Tigers 17–7. Drive: 7 plays, 77 yards, 2:44.
- NWST – David Fitzwater 26-yard pass from Shelton Eppler (Scotty Roblow kick), 5:38. Tigers 17–14. Drive: 6 plays, 75 yards, 3:12.
- LSU – Clyde Edwards-Helaire 3-yard run (Cade York kick), 3:27. Tigers 24–14. Drive: 6 plays, 70 yards, 2:11.

Third quarter

- LSU – Joe Burrow 5-yard run (kick failed), 13:19. Tigers 30–14. Drive: 4 plays, 74 yards, 1:41.
- LSU – Terrace Marshall Jr. 6-yard pass from Joe Burrow (Cade York kick), 9:36. Tigers 37–14. Drive: 7 plays, 33 yards, 2:28.
- LSU – John Emery Jr. 4-yard run (Cade York kick), 6:26. Tigers 44–14. Drive: 4 plays, 78 yards, 1:32.
- LSU – Tyrion Davis-Price 1-yard run (Cade York kick), 2:16. Tigers 51–14. Drive: 7 plays, 56 yards, 2:34.

Fourth quarter

- LSU – Trey Palmer 54-yard punt return (Cade York kick), 7:22. Tigers 58–14.
- LSU – Tyrion Davis-Price 2-yard run (Cade York kick), 2:12. Tigers 65–14. Drive: 7 plays, 62 yards, 3:23.

Top passers

- LSU – Joe Burrow – 21/24, 373 yards, 2 TD, INT
- NWST – Shelton Eppler – 21/38, 225 yards, 2 TD

Top rushers

- LSU – Clyde Edwards-Helaire – 13 rushes, 50 yards, 2 TD
- NWST – Stadford Anderson – 9 carries, 30 yards

Top receivers

- LSU – Justin Jefferson – 5 receptions, 124 yards
- NWST – David Fitzwater – 3 receptions, 68 yards, TD

For its third non-conference game of the season, LSU returned home to play in-state FCS foe Northwestern State of the Southland Conference. After a closer-than-expected first half, LSU pulled away for a decisive 65–14 victory. It was the 800th win in LSU program history.

Northwestern State received the opening kickoff, and their first drive ended with a failed fourth-and-seven attempt from the LSU 35 yard line. LSU's opening drive advanced to the Northwestern State eight yard line, but they settled for a 26-yard Cade York field goal. Northwestern State took the lead on the next drive with a 17-yard touchdown pass from Shelton Eppler to Quan Shorts. LSU responded with their own touchdown drive to reclaim the lead early in the second quarter via a four-yard run from Clyde Edwards-Helaire. LSU scored again shortly thereafter with a 14-yard touchdown pass from Joe Burrow to Terrace Marshall Jr. Northwestern State responded with another touchdown drive, ending with a 26-yard pass from Eppler to David Fitzwater to bring the score to 17–14 LSU. LSU's Edwards-Helaire scored again, this time from three yards out, with 3:27 remaining in the half. LSU's first play of its next possession ended with a Joe Burrow interception that was returned to their own 17 yard line, but Northwestern State missed a 35-yard field goal attempt to end the half. Some boos were heard as the home team headed to the locker room, with the score 24–14 at the half.

In the second half, LSU removed all doubt by scoring touchdowns on each of their first four possessions and holding Northwestern State scoreless for the remainder of the game. The Tigers scored first with a five-yard touchdown run from Joe Burrow, then a six-yard touchdown pass from Burrow to Marshall Jr., then a four-yard touchdown run from John Emery Jr., after which Burrow was pulled from the game. Backup Myles Brennan led another touchdown drive, ending with a one-yard score by Tyrion Davis-Price, making the score 51–14 at the end of the third quarter. In the fourth quarter, the Tigers scored on a 54-yard punt return touchdown by Trey Palmer, and a two-yard touchdown run by Davis-Price.

Joe Burrow completed 21 of 24 passes for 373 yards, two passing touchdowns, one interception, and a rushing touchdown. He became the sixth LSU quarterback to ever throw for 300-plus yards in consecutive games.

=== At Vanderbilt ===
No. 4 LSU Tigers at Vanderbilt Commodores – Game summary

Quarter	1	2	3	4	Total
No. 4 Tigers	28	10	21	7	66
Commodores	7	10	14	7	38

at Vanderbilt Stadium, Nashville, Tennessee

- Date: September 21
- Game time: 11:00 a.m. CDT
- Game attendance: 32,048
- TV announcers (SECN): Tom Hart, Jordan Rodgers and Cole Cubelic

To open the conference schedule, LSU traveled to face cross-divisional foe Vanderbilt for the first time since 2010. LSU won comfortably, 66–38, scoring the most points in regulation against an SEC opponent in school history.

Vanderbilt received the opening kickoff and capitalized with a five-yard touchdown run by Ke'Shawn Vaughn to open the scoring. LSU responded with their own touchdown drive, ending with a four-yard pass from Joe Burrow to Justin Jefferson. On their next drive, LSU needed just one play, which was a 64-yard touchdown pass from Burrow to Ja'Marr Chase. The Tigers scored twice more in the first quarter to make the score 28–7, first with a nine-yard run by Clyde Edwards-Helaire, and then with a 25-yard pass from Burrow to Chase. In the second quarter, the teams traded field goals, first with a 41-yarder by Vanderbilt's Ryley Guay, and then with a 25-yarder by LSU's Cade York. With 1:56 left in the half, Burrow and Chase connected for a touchdown once again, this time from 51 yards out. In the final minute of the half, LSU received the ball pinned at their own five yard line, and Vanderbilt's Elijah McAllister recovered a Clyde Edwards-Halaire fumble in the endzone for a score, making the score 38–17 at the half. Joe Burrow had 357 passing yards at half-time, a school record.

To open the second half, LSU's Micah Baskerville returned a Vanderbilt onside kick attempt 46 yards to the one yard line, after which Burrow threw his fifth touchdown pass to Racey McMath. Vanderbilt responded with a 52-yard touchdown run by Ke'Shawn Vaughn. LSU then scored again with a 16-yard touchdown pass from Burrow to Ja'Marr Chase, Burrow's sixth of the day. Baskerville then blocked a Vanderbilt punt attempt and recovered the ball for a touchdown to make the score 59–24 midway through the third quarter. Later in the third quarter, Vanderbilt scored again with an 18-yard pass from Riley Neal to Kalija Lipscomb. In the fourth quarter, LSU scored with a six-yard touchdown run by John Emery Jr., and Vanderbilt scored in the final minutes via a 47-yard pick-six thrown by Myles Brennan.

Joe Burrow's six touchdown passes set a school record. He completed 25 of 34 passes for 398 yards, becoming the first player in school history to throw for 350 or more yards in three consecutive games. He was named SEC Offensive Player of the Week for the third time of the season. Ja'Marr Chase had 10 receptions for 229 yards and four touchdowns.

=== Utah State ===
Utah State Aggies at No. 5 LSU Tigers – Game summary

Quarter	1	2	3	4	Total
Aggies	6	0	0	0	6
No. 5 Tigers	7	14	14	7	42

at Tiger Stadium, Baton Rouge, Louisiana

- Date: October 5
- Game time: 11:00 a.m. CST
- Game attendance: 100,266
- TV announcers (SECN): Dave Neal, D. J. Shockley and Dawn Davenport

After a bye week, LSU played its fourth and final non-conference game at home against Utah State of the Mountain West Conference. LSU won in a blowout, 42–6.

LSU received the opening kickoff and scored on the opening drive with a seven-yard pass from Joe Burrow to Derrick Dillon. On the next drive, a Burrow pass was tipped and intercepted by Utah State's Cameron Haney and returned to the LSU 7 yard line. The Aggies settled for a 30-yard field goal three plays later. LSU turned the ball over on downs on their next drive, and Utah State once again kicked a field goal, this time from 47 yards out to bring the score to 7–6 at the end of the first quarter. Early in the second quarter, Burrow scored a one-yard touchdown run. Burrow threw a 25-yard touchdown pass to Ja'Marr Chase with 4:55 left in the quarter, which brought the score to 21–6 at half-time. In the third quarter, Joe Burrow threw a four-yard touchdown pass to Justin Jefferson, and then a 39-yard touchdown pass later in the quarter, again to Jefferson. On Burrow's last drive of the game before being benched, he threw an eight-yard touchdown pass to Thaddeus Moss to make the score 42–6 early in the fourth quarter. Both teams failed to score for the remainder of the game, with LSU missing a 53-yard field goal attempt.

Joe Burrow completed 27 of 38 passes for 344 yards and five touchdowns to along with 42 yards and another touchdown on the ground. He became the first LSU quarterback to ever throw for 300-plus yards in four consecutive games.

=== No. 7 Florida ===
No. 7 Florida Gators at No. 5 LSU Tigers – Game summary

Quarter	1	2	3	4	Total
No. 7 Gators	7	14	7	0	28
No. 5 Tigers	7	14	14	7	42

at Tiger Stadium, Baton Rouge, Louisiana

- Date: October 12
- Game time: 7:00 p.m. CST
- Game attendance: 102,321
- TV announcers (ESPN): Chris Fowler, Kirk Herbstreit and Maria Taylor

Game information

First quarter

- LSU – Ja'Marr Chase 9-yard pass from Joe Burrow (Cade York kick), 9:55. Tigers 7–0. Drive: 2 plays, 66 yards, 0:32.
- FLA – Trevon Grimes 5-yard pass from Kyle Trask (Evan McPherson kick), 3:34. Tied 7–7. Drive: 12 plays, 75 yards, 6:21.

Second quarter

- LSU – Justin Jefferson 7-yard pass from Joe Burrow (Cade York kick), 12:55. Tigers 14–7. Drive: 5 plays, 82 yards, 2:09.
- FLA – La'Mical Perine 1-yard pass from Kyle Trask (Evan McPherson kick), 5:48. Tied 14–14. Drive: 13 plays, 75 yards, 6:56.
- LSU – Clyde Edwards-Helaire 39-yard run (Cade York kick), 3:55. Tigers 21–14. Drive: 4 plays, 75 yards, 1:53.
- FLA – Van Jefferson 6-yard pass from Kyle Trask (Evan McPherson kick), 0:04. Tied 21–21. Drive: 11 plays, 75 yards, 3:51.

Third quarter

- FLA – Van Jefferson 2-yard pass from Kyle Trask (Evan McPherson kick), 10:54. Gators 28–21. Drive: 8 plays, 76 yards, 4:06.
- LSU – Clyde Edwards-Helaire 5-yard run (Cade York kick), 7:12. Tied 28–28. Drive: 8 plays, 75 yards, 3:42.
- LSU – Tyrion Davis-Price 33-yard run (Cade York kick), 3:15. Tigers 35–28. Drive: 4 plays, 52 yards, 1:41.

Fourth quarter

- LSU – Ja'Marr Chase 54-yard pass from Joe Burrow (Cade York kick), 5:43. Tigers 42–28. Drive: 4 plays, 80 yards, 1:43.

Top passers

- FLA – Kyle Trask – 23/39, 310 yards, 3 TD, INT
- LSU – Joe Burrow – 21/24, 293 yards, 3 TD

Top rushers

- FLA – La'Mical Perine – 17 rushes, 65 yards
- LSU – Clyde Edwards-Helaire – 13 rushes, 134 yards, 2 TD

Top receivers

- FLA – Kyle Pitts – 5 receptions, 108 yards
- LSU – Ja'Marr Chase – 7 receptions, 127 yards, 2 TD

On October 12, LSU played cross-division rival and seventh-ranked Florida at home, pulling away in the second half for a 42–28 win.

LSU received the opening kickoff and advanced to the Florida 26 yard-line, but Cade York's 44-yard field goal attempt was no good. LSU's next drive started with a 57-yard run by Clyde Edwards-Helaire, and ended with a nine-yard touchdown pass from Joe Burrow to Ja'Marr Chase to open the scoring of the game. Florida responded with their own scoring drive, ending with a five-yard touchdown pass from Kyle Trask to Trevon Grimes. In the second quarter, LSU and Florida each traded two touchdown drives. LSU scored with a seven-yard pass from Burrow to Justin Jefferson, and Florida responded with a one-yard touchdown pass from Emory Jones to La'Mical Perine. LSU then scored via a 39-yard run by Edwards-Helaire, and Florida closed out the half with a six-yard touchdown pass from Trask to Van Jefferson with four seconds remaining, bringing the score to 21–21.

Florida took a 28–21 lead on the opening possession of the second half with a two-yard pass from Kyle Trask to Van Jefferson. LSU tied the game up again with a five-yard touchdown run by Edwards-Helaire. A 33-yard touchdown run by Tyrion Davis-Price on LSU's next possession regained them the lead. Midway through the fourth quarter, Florida threatened to tie the game again, advancing to the LSU 16 yard-line, but Trask threw an interception in LSU's endzone. The Tigers put the game out of reach on the next possession with a 54-yard touchdown pass from Burrow to Ja'Marr Chase to bring the score to 42–28 with 5:43 remaining. Florida advanced to the LSU two-yard line in the final minute, but turned the ball over on downs, after which LSU kneeled out the remainder of the clock.

Joe Burrow failed to throw for 300 or more yards for the first time in five games, finishing with 293 yards and three touchdowns on 21-of-24 attempts. Clyde Edwards-Helaire had 134 yards and two touchdowns. Ja-Marr Chase had seven receptions for 127 yards and two touchdowns, and Justin Jefferson had 10 receptions for 123 yards and a touchdown.

=== At Mississippi State ===
No. 2 LSU Tigers at Mississippi State Bulldogs – Game summary

Quarter	1	2	3	4	Total
No. 2 Tigers	3	19	14	0	36
Bulldogs	0	7	0	6	13

at Davis Wade Stadium, Starkville, Mississippi

- Date: October 19
- Game time: 2:30 p.m. CDT
- Game attendance: 59,282
- TV announcers (CBS): Brad Nessler, Gary Danielson and Jamie Erdahl

Game information

First quarter

- LSU – Cade York 20-yard field goal, 7:52. Tigers 3–0. Drive: 12 plays, 42 yards, 4:17.

Second quarter

- LSU – Cade York 23-yard field goal, 12:27. Tigers 6–0. Drive: 10 plays, 84 yards, 3:35.
- LSU – Cade York 25-yard field goal, 8:33. Tigers 9–0. Drive: 6 plays, 37 yards, 3:04.
- MSST – Garrett Shrader 12-yard run (Jace Christmann kick), 5:24. Tigers 9–7. Drive: 7 plays, 75 yards, 3:09.
- LSU – Racey McMath 60-yard pass from Joe Burrow (kick failed), 5:07. Tigers 15–7. Drive: 1 play, 60 yards, 0:17.
- LSU – Ja'Marr Chase 8-yard pass from Joe Burrow (Cade York kick), 0:50. Tigers 22–7. Drive: 5 plays, 55 yards, 1:03.

Third quarter

- LSU – Derrick Dillon 37-yard pass from Joe Burrow (Cade York kick), 10:36. Tigers 29–7. Drive: 4 plays, 66 yards, 1:27.
- LSU – Justin Jefferson 18-yard pass from Joe Burrow (Cade York kick), 5:36. Tigers 36–7. Drive: 7 plays, 80 yards, 2:52.

Fourth quarter

- MSST – Stephen Guidry 24-yard pass from Garrett Shrader (pass failed), 0:59. Tigers 36–13. Drive: 7 plays, 90 yards, 2:42.

Top passers

- LSU – Joe Burrow – 25/32, 327 yards, 4 TD
- MSST – Garrett Shrader – 17/28, 238 yards, TD, 2 INT

Top rushers

- LSU – Clyde Edwards-Helaire – 11 rushes, 53 yards
- MSST – Garrett Shrader – 19 rushes, 66 yards, TD

Top receivers

- LSU – Justin Jefferson – 8 receptions, 89 yards, TD
- MSST – Stephen Guidry – 6 receptions, 98 yards, TD

Next, LSU traveled to Starkville, Mississippi to play divisional foe Mississippi State. LSU won in another rout, 36–13.

LSU advanced to within the Mississippi State 10 yard-line on each of their first three drives, but had to settle for field goals each time. Cade York converted from 20, 23, and 25 yards to make the score 9–0 midway through the second quarter. Mississippi State made the score 9–7 with a 12-yard touchdown run by Garrett Shrader. LSU quickly re-asserted itself with a 60-yard touchdown pass from Joe Burrow to Racey McMath, then an interception of Mississippi State's Garrett Shrader by JaCoby Stevens, and another touchdown pass from Burrow, to Ja'Marr Chase from eight yards out. The score was 22–7 at half-time. In the third quarter, LSU scored twice more, with a 37-yard touchdown pass from Burrow to Derrick Dillon, and then an 18-yard touchdown pass from Burrow to Justin Jefferson, after which the score was 36–7. Neither team scored again until Mississippi State scored a touchdown in the final minute of the game, a 24-yard pass from Shrader to Stephen Guidry, to make the score 36–13.

Joe Burrow completed 25 of 32 attempts for 327 yards and four touchdowns. He passed LSU's single season passing touchdowns record (29) during the game.

=== No. 9 Auburn ===
No. 9 Auburn Tigers at No. 2 LSU Tigers – Game summary

Quarter	1	2	3	4	Total
No. 9 Auburn Tigers	3	7	3	7	20
No. 2 LSU Tigers	0	10	6	7	23

at Tiger Stadium, Baton Rouge, Louisiana

- Date: October 26
- Game time: 2:30 p.m. CDT
- Game weather: Cloudy, 61 °F (16 °C)
- Game attendance: 102,160
- Referee: Ken Williamson
- TV announcers (CBS): Brad Nessler, Gary Danielson and Jamie Erdahl

Game information

First quarter

- AUB – Anders Carlson 30-yard field goal, 8:39. Auburn 3–0. Drive: 14 plays, 42 yards, 4:07.

Second quarter

- LSU – Terrace Marshall Jr. 20-yard pass from Joe Burrow (Cade York kick), 12:28. LSU 7–3. Drive: 10 plays, 89 yards, 3:34.
- AUB – Bo Nix 1-yard run (Anders Carlson kick), 3:06. Auburn 10–7. Drive: 7 plays, 22 yards, 3:18.
- LSU – Cade York 20-yard field goal, 0:33. Tied 10–10. Drive: 10 plays, 73 yards, 2:33.

Third quarter

- AUB – Anders Carlson 23-yard field goal, 11:42. Auburn 13–10. Drive: 5 plays, 73 yards, 2:08.
- LSU – Clyde Edwards-Helaire 6-yard run (kick failed), 4:58. LSU 16–13. Drive: 4 plays, 45 yards, 0:55.

Fourth quarter

- LSU – Joe Burrow 7-yard run (Cade York kick), 13:29. LSU 23–13. Drive: 11 plays, 67 yards, 4:23.
- AUB – Seth Williams 5-yard pass from Bo Nix (Anders Carlson kick), 2:32. LSU 23–20. Drive: 4 plays, 49 yards, 0:54.

Top passers

- AUB – Bo Nix – 15/35, 157 yards, TD, INT
- LSU – Joe Burrow – 32/42, 321 yards, TD, INT

Top rushers

- AUB – D. J. Williams – 13 rushes, 130 yards
- LSU – Clyde Edwards-Helaire – 26 rushes, 136 yards, TD

Top receivers

- AUB – Seth Williams – 4 receptions, 65 yards, TD
- LSU – Ja'Marr Chase – 8 receptions, 123 yards

LSU returned home on October 26 for a top-ten showdown against ninth-ranked Auburn. LSU's offense struggled against Auburn's defense, putting up a season-low 23 points, but pulled out the win, 23–20.

Auburn struck first with a 30-yard field goal by Anders Carlson. Early in the second quarter, LSU took the lead with a 20-yard touchdown pass from Joe Burrow to Terrace Marshall Jr. Later in the quarter, Auburn's punt to LSU's Derek Stingley Jr. was fumbled by Stingley and recovered by Auburn on the LSU 22 yard-line. Auburn took advantage of the turnover by scoring via a one-yard touchdown run by Bo Nix. LSU tied the game at 10–10 with a 20-yard field goal by Cade York with 33 seconds remaining in the half.

In the third quarter, Auburn took a 13–10 lead with a 23-yard field goal by Carlson. LSU's next two possessions ended with a failed fourth down attempt on the Auburn 2 yard-line, and a Burrow interception. LSU regained the lead late in the third quarter with a six-yard touchdown run by Clyde Edwards-Helaire, and then in the early fourth quarter, a seven-yard touchdown run by Burrow. Most of the fourth quarter was a defensive struggle between the two teams, with the teams trading six consecutive punts. With 2:32 remaining, Auburn pulled within three points with a five-yard touchdown pass from Nix to Seth Williams. Their onside kick attempt was recovered by LSU's Derrick Dillon, and LSU was able to wind down the remainder of the clock to win the game.

Joe Burrow finished the game with 32-of-42 attempts for 321 yards, one touchdown pass, one rushing touchdown, and an interception. This was his eighth career 300-yard game, a school record. Clyde Edwards-Helaire ran for 136 yards and a touchdown on 26 attempts. Ja'Marr Chase led the team with eight receptions for 123 yards.

=== At No. 3 Alabama ===
No. 2 LSU Tigers at No. 3 Alabama Crimson Tide – Game summary

Quarter	1	2	3	4	Total
No. 2 Tigers	10	23	0	13	46
No. 3 Crimson Tide	7	6	7	21	41

at Bryant–Denny Stadium, Tuscaloosa, Alabama

- Date: November 9
- Game time: 2:30 p.m. CST
- Game weather: Sunny, 57 °F (14 °C)
- Game attendance: 101,821
- Referee: John McDaid
- TV announcers (CBS): Brad Nessler, Gary Danielson and Jamie Erdahl

Game information

First quarter

- LSU – Ja'Marr Chase 33-yard pass from Joe Burrow (Cade York kick), 9:15. Tigers 7–0. Drive: 6 plays, 92 yards, 2:46.
- LSU – Cade York 40-yard field goal, 4:54. Tigers 10–0. Drive: 5 plays, 18 yards, 3:11.
- ALA – Jaylen Waddle 77-yard punt return (Joseph Bulovas kick), 1:14. Tigers 10–7.

Second quarter

- LSU – Terrace Marshall Jr. 29-yard pass from Joe Burrow (kick blocked), 13:03. Tigers 16–7. Drive: 8 plays, 75 yards, 3:11.
- ALA – DeVonta Smith 64-yard pass from Tua Tagovailoa (kick failed), 6:43. Tigers 16–13. Drive: 4 plays, 90 yards, 1:20.
- LSU – Cade York 45-yard field goal, 4:20. Tigers 19–13. Drive: 7 plays, 48 yards, 2:23.
- LSU – Clyde Edwards-Helaire 1-yard run (Cade York kick), 0:26. Tigers 26–13. Drive: 8 plays, 61 yards, 2:13.
- LSU – Clyde Edwards-Helaire 13-yard pass from Joe Burrow (Cade York kick), 0:06. Tigers 33–13. Drive: 1 play, 26 yards, 0:05.

Third quarter

- ALA – Najee Harris 15-yard pass from Tua Tagovailoa (Joseph Bulovas kick), 4:51. Tigers 33–20. Drive: 10 plays, 95 yards, 3:30.

Fourth quarter

- ALA – Najee Harris 1-yard run (Joseph Bulovas kick), 14:33. Tigers 33–27. Drive: 9 plays, 78 yards, 3:37.
- LSU – Clyde Edwards-Helaire 5-yard run (pass failed), 10:07. Tigers 39–27. Drive: 12 plays, 75 yards, 4:26.
- ALA – Jerry Jeudy 5-yard pass from Tua Tagovailoa (Joseph Bulovas kick), 5:32. Tigers 39–34. Drive: 14 plays, 75 yards, 4:35.
- LSU – Clyde Edwards-Helaire 7-yard run (Cade York kick), 1:37. Tigers 46–34. Drive: 7 plays, 75 yards, 3:55.
- ALA – DeVonta Smith 85-yard pass from Tua Tagovailoa (Joseph Bulovas kick), 1:21. Tigers 46–41. Drive: 1 play, 85 yards, 0:16.

Top passers

- LSU – Joe Burrow – 31/39, 393 yards, 3 TD
- ALA – Tua Tagovailoa – 21/40, 418 yards, 4 TD, INT

Top rushers

- LSU – Clyde Edwards-Helaire – 20 rushes, 103 yards, 3 TD
- ALA – Najee Harris – 19 rushes, 146 yards, TD

Top receivers

- LSU – Ja'Marr Chase – 6 receptions, 140 yards, TD
- ALA – DeVonta Smith – 7 receptions, 213 yards, 2 TD

After a second bye week, LSU traveled to Tuscaloosa to play rival Alabama. Heading into the game, LSU was ranked No. 1 and Alabama No. 2 in the AP Poll. The season's first College Football Playoff rankings were released on the Tuesday prior to the game, with LSU ranked No. 2 and Alabama ranked No. 3. Alabama quarterback Tua Tagovailoa, who was only 20 days removed from a minor ankle surgery, was making his return, and the battle between him and Joe Burrow was expected to play a major role in the Heisman Trophy race. Adding even more aura of spectacle to the game was the attendance of President Donald Trump. Alabama was a six-point betting favorite heading into the game. LSU won the game in a shootout, 46–41.

On Alabama's opening possession, the Crimson Tide advanced to the LSU 8-yard line, but the ball slipped out of Tua Tagovailoa's hand for a fumble, recovered by LSU's Ray Thornton. LSU responded with a touchdown drive ending with a 33-yard pass from Joe Burrow to Ja'Marr Chase. Alabama gave LSU a short field again when they fumbled a punt snap on their next drive, after which LSU scored via a 40-yard field goal by Cade York. Alabama got on the board late in the first quarter with a 77-yard punt return touchdown by Jaylen Waddle. Early in the second quarter, LSU scored with a 29-yard pass from Burrow to Terrace Marshall Jr. Alabama pulled within three with a 64-yard touchdown pass from Tagovailoa to DeVonta Smith. After a 45-yard field goal by York with 4:20 remaining in the first half, LSU scored again with a one-yard touchdown run by Clyde Edwards-Helaire with 26 seconds remaining. Alabama's Tua Tagovailoa threw an interception on their next play, returned by LSU's Patrick Queen to the Alabama 26-yard line. LSU was able to score after a 15-yard penalty on Alabama and then a 13-yard pass from Burrow to Edwards-Helaire to make the score 33–13 at half-time.

In the third quarter, Alabama scored with a 15-yard touchdown pass from Tagovailoa to Najee Harris. Early in the fourth quarter, Harris scored again on a one-yard run, to make the score 33–27 LSU. LSU then scored with a five-yard run by Edwards-Helaire, but Alabama pulled within a score again with a five-yard touchdown pass from Tagovailoa to Jerry Jeudy with 5:32 remaining. LSU went up 46–34 with 1:37 remaining with a seven-yard touchdown run by Edwards-Helaire, but Alabama scored on their next play with an 85-yard touchdown pass from Tagovailoa to DeVonta Smith with 1:21 remaining. Alabama's onside kick attempt was recovered by LSU's Justin Jefferson, and, after a first down run by Edwards-Helaire, LSU kneeled out the rest of the clock to win the game, 46–41.

LSU's 46 points were the most ever scored on Alabama in Bryant–Denny Stadium in regulation. The win also snapped an eight-game losing streak to Alabama by LSU. Joe Burrow finished with 31-of-39 attempts for 393 yards and three touchdowns. He earned his second Walter Camp National Offensive Player of the Week honors for the performance. Burrow was named SEC Co-offensive Player of the Week, sharing the award with teammate Clyde Edwards-Helaire, who had 180 total yards and four total touchdowns (three rushing, one receiving). Ja'Marr Chase had 140 receiving yards and a touchdown in the game.

=== At Ole Miss ===
No. 1 LSU Tigers at Ole Miss Rebels – Game summary

Quarter	1	2	3	4	Total
No. 1 Tigers	14	17	13	14	58
Rebels	0	7	16	14	37

at Vaught–Hemingway Stadium, Oxford, Mississippi

- Date: November 16
- Game time: 6:00 p.m. CST
- Game attendance: 53,797
- TV announcers (ESPN): Sean McDonough, Todd Blackledge and Holly Rowe

LSU next traveled to Oxford, Mississippi to play Ole Miss in the Magnolia Bowl. LSU won by a score of 58–37.

LSU opened the scoring on their opening drive with a 34-yard touchdown pass from Joe Burrow to Ja'Marr Chase. After each team traded missed field goal attempts, LSU scored again with a four-yard run by Tyrion Davis-Price. Two more second quarter scores by LSU, the first a 51-yard pass from Burrow to Chase, and the second a 12-yard pass from Burrow to Justin Jefferson, made the score 28–0. Ole Miss got on the board in the second quarter with a five-yard touchdown run by John Rhys Plumlee, and LSU converted a 33-yard field goal in the final seconds of the half to make the score 31–7 at half-time.

Ole Miss scored on the opening possession of the third quarter with a 46-yard touchdown run by Plumlee. After a 27-yard LSU field goal, Ole Miss scored again with a 60-yard run by Plumlee to make the score 34–23. LSU responded with a seven-yard touchdown pass from Burrow to Jefferson, and then converted a 52-yard field goal after an Ole Miss interception to make the score 44–23 heading into the fourth quarter. Early in the final quarter, Joe Burrow threw an interception, and Ole Miss scored on the next play with a 35-yard run by Plumlee. Burrow threw another interception on the next drive, but the LSU defense forced a turnover on downs. LSU scored with a 61-yard touchdown pass from Burrow to Chase on the next drive. Ole Miss scored its last points with 3:19 to go with a 55-yard pass from Matt Corral to Elijah Moore, but LSU scored once again on the next play with a 49-yard touchdown run by Clyde Edwards-Helaire, which ended the scoring at 58–37.

Joe Burrow set a career high with 489 yards to go along with five touchdown passes. He passed Rohan Davey's LSU single season passing yards record during the game. Burrow also completed 17 consecutive passes at one point, setting a school record. Ja'Marr Chase had 227 receiving yards and three touchdowns, and was later named SEC Offensive Player of the Week. Clyde Edwards-Helaire had 172 rushing yards and a touchdown.

=== Arkansas ===
Arkansas Razorbacks at No. 1 LSU Tigers – Game summary

Quarter	1	2	3	4	Total
Razorbacks	3	3	0	14	20
No. 1 Tigers	7	21	21	7	56

at Tiger Stadium, Baton Rouge, Louisiana

- Date: November 23
- Game time: 6:00 p.m. CST
- Game attendance: 101,173
- TV announcers (ESPN): Dave Pasch, Greg McElroy and Tom Luginbill

For the second-to-last game of the regular season, LSU faced rival Arkansas in a battle for the Golden Boot, and with an opportunity to secure LSU's spot in the SEC Championship Game with a win. LSU did just that with a 56–20 victory.

LSU scored on the game's opening drive with a 37-yard touchdown pass from Joe Burrow to Ja'Marr Chase. Arkansas converted two field goals, from 24 yards and 47 yards, to make the score 7–6 midway through the second quarter. LSU scored touchdowns on their final three possessions of the first half via a two-yard run by Tyrion Davis-Price, a 27-yard run by Clyde Edwards-Helaire, and a 10-yard pass from Burrow to Justin Jefferson, to make the score 28–6 at half-time.

Arkansas opened the second-half with a missed 45-yard field goal attempt. LSU fumbled on its first possession, but then the Tigers scored on four consecutive possessions, with a 50-yard pass from Burrow to Chase, a 26-yard run by Edwards-Helaire, an 89-yard run by Edwards-Helaire, and a 39-yard run by John Emery Jr. The score was then 56–6 early in the fourth quarter. Arkansas then scored with a 24-yard pass from Michael Woods II to Jack Lindsey, then recovered an onside kick attempt and scored with a two-yard run by Devwah Whaley to end the scoring on the day at 56–20.

Clyde Edwards-Helaire had his fourth consecutive 100-yard game by running for a career-high 188 yards and three touchdowns. Joe Burrow passed for 327 yards and three touchdowns. Ja'Marr Chase added 144 receiving yards and two touchdowns. Linebacker JaCoby Stevens, who had a career high three sacks and four tackles for loss, was named SEC Defensive Player of the Week. Safety Maurice Hampton, who was making his first career start in place of the injured Grant Delpit, had six tackles and was named SEC Freshman of the Week.

=== Texas A&M ===
Texas A&M Aggies at No. 1 LSU Tigers – Game summary

Quarter	1	2	3	4	Total
Aggies	0	0	7	0	7
No. 1 Tigers	21	10	10	9	50

at Tiger Stadium, Baton Rouge, Louisiana

- Date: November 30
- Game time: 6:00 p.m. CST
- Game attendance: 102,218
- TV announcers (ESPN): Sean McDonough, Todd Blackledge and Holly Rowe

Game information

First quarter

- LSU – Clyde Edwards-Helaire 5-yard run (Cade York kick), 12:50. Tigers 7–0. Drive: 6 plays, 75 yards, 2:10.
- LSU – Justin Jefferson 12-yard pass from Joe Burrow (Cade York kick), 7:00. Tigers 14–0. Drive: 11 plays, 80 yards, 4:06.
- LSU – Ja'Marr Chase 78-yard pass from Joe Burrow (Cade York kick), 1:47. Tigers 21–0. Drive: 3 plays, 91 yards, 1:20.

Second quarter

- LSU – Tyrion Davis-Price 4-yard run (Cade York kick), 10:46. Tigers 28–0. Drive: 11 plays, 55 yards, 4:15.
- LSU – Cade York 51-yard field goal, 5:58. Tigers 31–0. Drive: 9 plays, 53 yards, 3:08.

Third quarter

- LSU – Cade York 50-yard field goal, 7:25. Tigers 34–0. Drive: 5 plays, 8 yards, 2:03.
- TAMU – Isaiah Spiller 1-yard run (Seth Small kick), 4:13. Tigers 34–7. Drive: 6 plays, 75 yards, 3:12.
- LSU – Ja'Marr Chase 18-yard pass from Joe Burrow (Cade York kick), 1:31. Tigers 41–7. Drive: 7 plays, 85 yards, 2:42.

Fourth quarter

- LSU – Racey McMath 58-yard pass from Myles Brennan (Cade York kick), 10:36. Tigers 48–7. Drive: 5 plays, 80 yards, 2:06.
- LSU – James Foster sacked in end zone, 3:32. Tigers 50–7.

Top passers

- TAMU – Kellen Mond – 10/30, 92 yards, 3 INT
- LSU – Joe Burrow – 23/32, 352 yards, 3 TD

Top rushers

- TAMU – Isaiah Spiller – 11 rushes, 66 yards, TD
- LSU – Clyde Edwards-Helaire – 18 rushes, 87 yards, TD

Top receivers

- TAMU – Isaiah Spiller – 3 receptions, 45 yards
- LSU – Ja'Marr Chase – 7 receptions, 197 yards, 2 TD

LSU's regular season finale was against Texas A&M. The previous meeting between the two schools tied the NCAA record for most overtimes (seven) and set the FBS record for most combined points in a game (146), in which the Tigers lost to the Aggies, 74–72. The 2019 game was not nearly as close, as LSU secured an undefeated regular season with a 50–7 blowout win. Quarterback Joe Burrow, in his final home game as a Tiger, made a pregame introduction to great fanfare wearing a jersey with the name "Burreaux" on the back, paying tribute to the French heritage of the state and university.

LSU jumped out to a 31–0 lead by scoring on each of their first five possessions. The Tigers received the opening kickoff and scored in six plays with a five-yard touchdown run by Clyde Edwards-Helaire. Their next drive ended with a 12-yard touchdown pass from Joe Burrow to Justin Jefferson. Late in the first quarter, they scored again with a 78-yard pass from Burrow to Ja'Marr Chase. In the second quarter, LSU scored with a four-yard touchdown run by Tyrion Davis-Price, and a 51-yard field goal by Cade York. The score was 31–0 at half-time. In the third quarter, LSU's Cade York converted a 50-yard field goal, and then Texas A&M scored their only points of the day with a one-yard run by Isaiah Spiller. LSU responded with an 18-yard touchdown pass from Burrow to Chase, then intercepting a pass from Texas A&M's Kellen Mond, and scoring another touchdown, a 58-yard pass from backup quarterback Myles Brennan to Racey McMath. Late in the fourth quarter, the Tigers pinned the Aggies at their own 1-yard line with a punt, and then Neil Farrell Jr. sacked James Foster in the endzone for a safety to end the scoring on the day at 50–7.

Joe Burrow had 352 passing yards and three touchdowns in the game, and in the process set the SEC record for single-season passing yards previously held by Kentucky's Tim Couch, and tied the SEC record for single-season passing touchdowns, shared with Missouri's Drew Lock.

=== Vs. No. 4 Georgia (SEC Championship) ===
No. 4 Georgia Bulldogs vs. No. 2 LSU Tigers (SEC Championship Game) – Game summary

Quarter	1	2	3	4	Total
No. 4 Bulldogs	0	3	0	7	10
No. 2 Tigers	14	3	17	3	37

at Mercedes-Benz Stadium, Atlanta, Georgia

- Date: December 7
- Game time: 3:30 p.m. CST/4:30 p.m. EST
- Game weather: None (retractable roof closed)
- Game attendance: 74,150
- Referee: James Carter
- TV announcers (CBS): Brad Nessler, Gary Danielson and Jamie Erdahl

Game information

First quarter

- LSU – Ja'Marr Chase 23-yard pass from Joe Burrow (Cade York kick), 9:09. Tigers 7–0. Drive: 8 plays, 75 yards, 3:38.
- LSU – Terrace Marshall Jr. 7-yard pass from Joe Burrow (Cade York kick), 0:12. Tigers 14–0. Drive: 5 plays, 65 yards, 1:44.

Second quarter

- UGA – Rodrigo Blankenship 39-yard field goal, 11:28. Tigers 14–3. Drive: 10 plays, 53 yards, 3:44.
- LSU – Cade York 41-yard field goal, 2:22. Tigers 17–3. Drive: 11 plays, 57 yards, 4:22.

Third quarter

- LSU – Cade York 28-yard field goal, 8:20. Tigers 20–3. Drive: 16 plays, 65 yards, 6:40.
- LSU – Terrace Marshall Jr. 4-yard pass from Joe Burrow (Cade York kick), 2:18. Tigers 27–3. Drive: 4 plays, 80 yards, 1:59.
- LSU – Justin Jefferson 8-yard pass from Joe Burrow (Cade York kick), 0:45. Tigers 34–3. Drive: 3 plays, 13 yards, 1:25.

Fourth quarter

- UGA – George Pickens 2-yard pass from Jake Fromm (Rodrigo Blankenship kick), 11:41. Tigers 34–10. Drive: 13 plays, 75 yards, 4:04.
- LSU – Cade York 50-yard field goal, 7:41. Tigers 37–10. Drive: 7 plays, 33 yards, 4:00.

Top passers

- UGA – Jake Fromm – 20/42, 225 yards, TD, 2 INT
- LSU – Joe Burrow – 28/38, 349 yards, 4 TD

Top rushers

- UGA – Brian Herrien – 8 rushes, 24 yards
- LSU – Clyde Edwards-Helaire – 15 rushes, 57 yards

Top receivers

- UGA – George Pickens – 4 receptions, 54 yards, TD
- LSU – Justin Jefferson – 7 receptions, 115 yards, TD

LSU, as undefeated champions of the SEC West Division, faced off against 11–1 East Division champion Georgia in the SEC Championship Game in Atlanta. Heading into the game, LSU was ranked second and Georgia fourth in the College Football Playoff rankings. There was widespread speculation that both teams could possibly make it into the playoff, depending on the outcome of the game. LSU was considered a 7.5-point betting favorite. LSU removed all doubt about its resume by winning comfortably, 37–10. This was LSU's 16th conference championship in school history, its 12th in the Southeastern Conference, and first since 2011.

After a Georgia punt on the game's opening possession, LSU opened the scoring with a 23-yard touchdown pass from Joe Burrow to Ja'Marr Chase. LSU scored again late in the first quarter after a Georgia missed field goal attempt with a seven-yard pass from Burrow to Terrace Marshall Jr. Georgia got on the board early in the second quarter with a 39-yard field goal by Rodrigo Blankenship. LSU's Cade York converted his own field goal, from 41 yards out, with 2:22 remaining in the half. Georgia's next possession ended in a Jake Fromm interception to Derek Stingley Jr., but LSU's 48-yard field goal attempt missed with 14 seconds to go kept the score at 17–3 LSU at half-time.

LSU's opening possession of the second half ended with a 28-yard field goal by York, and Georgia's ensuing possession resulted in a 37-yard miss by Blankenship. LSU then quickly widened its lead with an 80-yard drive that included a 71-yard pass from Burrow to Justin Jefferson and ended with a four-yard touchdown pass from Burrow to Marshall Jr., followed by another interception of Fromm by Stingley Jr., and then an eight-yard touchdown pass from Burrow to Jefferson to make the score 34–3 at the end of the third quarter. In the fourth quarter, Georgia scored its only touchdown via a two-yard pass from Fromm to George Pickens, and LSU scored with a 50-yard field goal by York to end the scoring at 37–10.

Joe Burrow's performance, with 349 passing yards, four touchdowns, 41 rushing yards, and a 16-yard reception, was described by the Associated Press as "completing his Heisman Trophy coronation". He was named MVP of the game. Justin Jefferson had seven receptions for 115 yards and a touchdown.

=== Vs. No. 4 Oklahoma (Peach Bowl) ===
No. 4 Oklahoma Sooners vs. No. 1 LSU Tigers (Peach Bowl) – Game summary

Quarter	1	2	3	4	Total
No. 4 Sooners	7	7	7	7	28
No. 1 Tigers	21	28	7	7	63

at Mercedes-Benz Stadium, Atlanta, Georgia

- Date: December 28
- Game time: 3:00 p.m. CST/4:00 p.m. EST
- Game weather: None (retractable roof closed)
- Game attendance: 78,347
- Referee: Stuart Mullins
- TV announcers (ESPN): Sean McDonough, Todd Blackledge, Holly Rowe and Laura Rutledge

Game information

First quarter

- LSU – Justin Jefferson 19-yard pass from Joe Burrow (Cade York kick), 12:03. Tigers 7–0. Drive: 3 plays, 42 yards, 0:52.
- OKLA – Kennedy Brooks 3-yard run (Gabe Brkic kick), 7:34. Tied 7–7. Drive: 5 plays, 69 yards, 2:21.
- LSU – Terrace Marshall Jr. 8-yard pass from Joe Burrow (Cade York kick), 4:24. Tigers 14–7. Drive: 9 plays, 75 yards, 3:10.
- LSU – Justin Jefferson 35-yard pass from Joe Burrow (Cade York kick), 1:16. Tigers 21–7. Drive: 6 plays, 86 yards, 2:31.

Second quarter

- LSU – Justin Jefferson 42-yard pass from Joe Burrow (Cade York kick), 12:13. Tigers 28–7. Drive: 6 plays, 80 yards, 2:02.
- LSU – Justin Jefferson 30-yard pass from Joe Burrow (Cade York kick), 9:17. Tigers 35–7. Drive: 6 plays, 55 yards, 2:46.
- OKLA – Jalen Hurts 2-yard run (Gabe Brkic kick), 4:45. Tigers 35–14. Drive: 10 plays, 75 yards, 4:32.
- LSU – Thaddeus Moss 62-yard pass from Joe Burrow (Cade York kick), 4:18. Tigers 42–14. Drive: 2 plays, 75 yards, 0:27.
- LSU – Terrace Marshall Jr. 2-yard pass from Joe Burrow (Cade York kick), 0:50. Tigers 49–14. Drive: 5 plays, 63 yards, 2:04.

Third quarter

- LSU – Joe Burrow 2-yard run (Cade York kick), 10:11. Tigers 56–14. Drive: 13 plays, 74 yards, 4:49.
- OKLA – Jalen Hurts 12-yard run (Gabe Brkic kick), 4:19. Tigers 56–21. Drive: 13 plays, 75 yards, 5:52.

Fourth quarter

- OKLA – T. J. Pledger 1-yard run (Gabe Brkic kick), 9:39. Tigers 56–28. Drive: 9 plays, 71 yards, 4:27.
- LSU – John Emery Jr. 6-yard run (Cade York kick), 3:59. Tigers 63–28. Drive: 9 plays, 75 yards, 5:40.

Top passers

- OKLA – Jalen Hurts – 15/31, 217 yards, INT
- LSU – Joe Burrow – 29/39, 493 yards, 7 TD

Top rushers

- OKLA – Jalen Hurts – 14 rushes, 43 yards, 2 TD
- LSU – Chris Curry – 16 rushes, 90 yards

Top receivers

- OKLA – CeeDee Lamb – 4 receptions, 119 yards
- LSU – Justin Jefferson – 14 receptions, 227 yards, 4 TD

In the final College Football Playoff rankings of the year, LSU moved from second to first, passing Ohio State, who had beaten Wisconsin in the Big Ten Championship Game, 34–21. LSU's opponent in the CFP semi-final, the Peach Bowl, was fourth-ranked Oklahoma, champions of the Big 12 Conference at 12–1. LSU entered the game as 13.5-point betting favorites. LSU exceeded those high expectations by beating the Sooners 63–28.

After an Oklahoma three-and-out to open the game, LSU scored in three plays with a 19-yard touchdown pass from Joe Burrow to Justin Jefferson. After trading three-and-outs, Oklahoma responded with a three-yard touchdown run by Kennedy Brooks. The score was tied at 7–7, but LSU put the game out of reach by scoring touchdowns on each of their next seven possessions. Before the end of the first quarter, they scored via an eight-yard pass from Burrow to Terrace Marshall Jr., and a 35-yard pass from Burrow to Jefferson. In the second quarter, LSU scored with a 42-yard pass from Burrow to Jefferson, then a 30-yard pass from Burrow to Jefferson. Oklahoma temporarily stopped the bleeding with a two-yard touchdown run by Jalen Hurts, but LSU responded with a 62-yard touchdown pass from Burrow to Thaddeus Moss and a two-yard pass from Burrow to Marshall Jr. before the half. The score at half-time was 49–14. Joe Burrow had seven touchdown passes in the first half, which tied the all-time NCAA full-game bowl record, and Justin Jefferson's four touchdown receptions also tied the all-time full-game bowl record.

LSU opened the second half with a touchdown drive that ended with a two-yard run by Burrow, his eighth touchdown of the day, after which he and most other offensive starters were benched. Oklahoma's next possession ended with a 12-yard touchdown run by Hurts. After a missed 46-yard field goal attempt by LSU's Cade York early in the fourth quarter, Oklahoma scored again with a one-yard touchdown run by T.J. Pledger. LSU scored once more with a six-yard touchdown run by John Emery Jr. with 3:59 remaining to end the scoring at 63–28.

Joe Burrow had 493 passing yards, seven passing touchdowns, and a rushing touchdown in just over one half of play; he was named Offensive MVP of the game. Linebacker K'Lavon Chaisson was named Defensive MVP after finishing with two sacks and six tackles. Justin Jefferson finished with 14 receptions for 227 yards and four touchdowns in the game.

=== Vs. No. 3 Clemson (National Championship) ===
No. 3 Clemson Tigers vs. No. 1 LSU Tigers (2020 CFP National Championship) – Game summary

Quarter	1	2	3	4	Total
No. 3 Clemson Tigers	7	10	8	0	25
No. 1 LSU Tigers	7	21	7	7	42

at Mercedes-Benz Superdome, New Orleans, Louisiana

- Date: January 13, 2020
- Game time: 7:00 p.m. CST
- Game weather: None (played indoors)
- Game attendance: 76,885
- Referee: Chris Coyte
- TV announcers (ESPN): Chris Fowler, Kirk Herbstreit, Maria Taylor and Tom Rinaldi

Game information

First quarter

- CLEM – Trevor Lawrence 1-yard run (B. T. Potter kick), 6:34. Clemson 7–0. Drive: 5 plays, 67 yards, 2:05.
- LSU – Ja'Marr Chase 52-yard pass from Joe Burrow (Cade York kick), 2:20. Tied 7–7. Drive: 4 plays, 70 yards, 1:36.

Second quarter

- CLEM – B. T. Potter 52-yard field goal, 13:43. Clemson 10–7. Drive: 9 plays, 40 yards, 3:37.
- CLEM – Tee Higgins 36-yard run (B. T. Potter kick), 10:38. Clemson 17–7. Drive: 4 plays, 96 yards, 1:32.
- LSU – Joe Burrow 3-yard run (Cade York kick), 9:17. Clemson 17–14. Drive: 5 plays, 75 yards, 1:21.
- LSU – Ja'Marr Chase 14-yard pass from Joe Burrow (Cade York kick), 5:19. LSU 21–17. Drive: 6 plays, 87 yards, 2:03.
- LSU – Thaddeus Moss 6-yard pass from Joe Burrow (Cade York kick), 0:10. LSU 28–17. Drive: 11 plays, 95 yards, 3:28.

Third quarter

- CLEM – Travis Etienne 3-yard run (Trevor Lawrence pass to Amari Rodgers), 10:49. LSU 28–25. Drive: 6 plays, 50 yards, 2:37.
- LSU – Thaddeus Moss 4-yard pass from Joe Burrow (Cade York kick), 5:13. LSU 35–25. Drive: 6 plays, 68 yards, 2:26.

Fourth quarter

- LSU – Terrace Marshall Jr. 24-yard pass from Joe Burrow (Cade York kick), 12:08. LSU 42–25. Drive: 8 plays, 57 yards, 3:42.

Top passers

- CLEM – Trevor Lawrence – 18/37, 234 yards
- LSU – Joe Burrow – 31/49, 463 yards, 5 TD

Top rushers

- CLEM – Travis Etienne – 15 rushes, 78 yards, TD
- LSU – Clyde Edwards-Helaire – 16 rushes, 110 yards

Top receivers

- CLEM – Justyn Ross – 5 receptions, 76 yards
- LSU – Ja'Marr Chase – 9 receptions, 221 yards, 2 TD

By winning the Peach Bowl, LSU advanced to the College Football Playoff National Championship to play the winner of the Fiesta Bowl, third-seeded Clemson. The game was played at the Mercedes-Benz Superdome in New Orleans, mirroring LSU's previous appearances in national championship games in 2012, 2008, and 2004. Clemson was the defending national champion and on a 29-game winning streak, but LSU was considered a 5.5-point betting favorite heading into the game.

To open the game, both teams were forced to punt on each of their first two possessions. Clemson opened the scoring with a one-yard touchdown run by quarterback Trevor Lawrence. LSU evened the score with a 52-yard touchdown pass from Joe Burrow to Ja'Marr Chase. Early in the second quarter, Clemson regained the lead with a 52-yard field goal by B.T. Potter, and then extended the lead on their next possession with a 36-yard touchdown run by Tee Higgins. LSU scored touchdowns on their next three possessions to close out the first half: first on a three-yard run by Burrow, then a 14-yard pass from Burrow to Chase, and then a six-yard pass from Burrow to Thaddeus Moss with 10 seconds remaining in the half. The score was 28–17 LSU at half-time.

In the third quarter, Clemson pulled within three with a three-yard touchdown run by Travis Etienne and a successful two-point conversion via a pass from Lawrence to Amari Rodgers. LSU extended the lead with a four-yard touchdown pass from Burrow to Moss late in the quarter. Early in the fourth quarter, LSU scored again, with a 24-yard touchdown pass from Burrow to Terrace Marshall Jr. to make the score 42–25. LSU's defense held Clemson scoreless throughout the fourth quarter to help seal the victory.

With the win, LSU finished as undefeated College Football Playoff champions, and were later crowned unanimous national champions by the polls. This was LSU's fourth national title in school history, and first since the 2007 season. It was their first undefeated season since 1958, and the second ever 15–0 season by any FBS team in the modern era (after Clemson the previous season). Joe Burrow had 463 passing yards and five touchdowns in the game, and was named Offensive MVP. Linebacker Patrick Queen had eight total tackles, including 0.5 sacks and 2.5 tackles for loss and was named Defensive MVP.

== Rankings ==
Ranking movements Legend: ██ Increase in ranking ██ Decrease in ranking ( ) = First-place votes
	Week																
Poll	Pre	1	2	3	4	5	6	7	8	9	10	11	12	13	14	15	Final
AP	6	6	4	4	4	5	5	2 (12)	2 (16)	1 (17)	1 (17)	1 (54)	1 (54)	1 (50)	1 (40)	1 (47)	1 (62)
Coaches	6	6	5	5	5	6	6	3 (3)	3 (3)	2 (7)	2 (11)	1 (55)	1 (55)	1 (52)	1 (43)	1 (46)	1 (65)
CFP	Not released										2	1	1	2	2	1	Not released

== Awards and honors ==
Individual awards
Player / coach	Award	Ref.
Joe Burrow	Heisman Trophy; Maxwell Award; Walter Camp Award; AP Player of the Year; Sporting News Player of the Year; Davey O'Brien Award; Johnny Unitas Golden Arm Award; Manning Award; SEC Offensive Player of the Year	
Ja'Marr Chase	Fred Biletnikoff Award	
Grant Delpit	Jim Thorpe Award	
Derek Stingley Jr.	SEC Newcomer of the Year	
Ed Orgeron	AFCA Coach of the Year Award; AP Coach of the Year; Eddie Robinson Coach of the Year Award; Home Depot Coach of the Year; Walter Camp Coach of the Year Award; SEC Coach of the Year	
Joe Brady	Broyles Award	

Weekly awards
Player	Award	Date Awarded	Ref.
Joe Burrow	SEC Co-offensive Player of the Week	September 2	
Joe Burrow	Walter Camp National Offensive Player of the Week; SEC Offensive Player of the Week	September 9	
Cade York	SEC Special Teams Player of the Week	September 9	
Joe Burrow	SEC Offensive Player of the Week	September 23	
Joe Burrow	SEC Co-offensive Player of the Week	October 14	
Derek Stingley Jr.	SEC Freshman of the Week	October 14	
JaCoby Stevens	SEC Co-defensive Player of the Week	October 21	
JaCoby Stevens	SEC Co-defensive Player of the Week	October 28	
Joe Burrow	Walter Camp National Offensive Player of the Week; SEC Co-offensive Player of the Week	November 11	
Clyde Edwards-Helaire	SEC Co-offensive Player of the Week	November 11	
Ja'Marr Chase	SEC Offensive Player of the Week	November 18	
JaCoby Stevens	SEC Defensive Player of the Week	November 25	
Maurice Hampton	SEC Freshman of the Week	November 25	

All-American
Player	AP	AFCA	FWAA	TSN	WCFF	Designation
Joe Burrow	1	1	1	1	1	Unanimous
Ja'Marr Chase	1	1	1	1	1	Unanimous
Grant Delpit	2	1		1	1	Consensus
Derek Stingley Jr.	1	1	2	1	2	Consensus
Lloyd Cushenberry		2	2			
The NCAA recognizes a selection to all five of the AP, AFCA, FWAA, TSN and WCFF first teams for unanimous selections and three of five for consensus selections.

All-SEC
Player	Position	Coaches	Media
Joe Burrow	QB	1	1
Lloyd Cushenberry	C	1	–
Ja'Marr Chase	WR	1	1
Clyde Edwards-Helaire	RB	1	1
K'Lavon Chaisson	LB	1	2
Grant Delpit	DB	1	2
Adrian Magee	OL	2	–
Damien Lewis	OL	2	2
Rashard Lawrence	DL	2	–
Derek Stingley Jr.	DB	2	1
JaCoby Stevens	DB	2	–
Clyde Edwards-Helaire	PR	2	–
Justin Jefferson	WR	–	2
Cade York	K	–	2
Kristian Fulton	DB	–	2

== Players drafted into the NFL ==
The 2020 NFL draft was held remotely (due to the ongoing coronavirus pandemic) from April 23–25. LSU had the most players selected in the draft with 14. This tied the 2003 Ohio State NFL Draft record for a single school during a seven-round draft. LSU also had the most first-round selections of the draft with five, including first overall pick Joe Burrow. LSU also tied the 2016 Ohio State Buckeyes with ten draft picks taken within the first three rounds.

Round	Pick	Player	Position	NFL club
1	1	Joe Burrow	QB	Cincinnati Bengals
1	20	K'Lavon Chaisson	OLB	Jacksonville Jaguars
1	22	Justin Jefferson	WR	Minnesota Vikings
1	28	Patrick Queen	LB	Baltimore Ravens
1	32	Clyde Edwards-Helaire	RB	Kansas City Chiefs
2	44	Grant Delpit	S	Cleveland Browns
2	61	Kristian Fulton	CB	Tennessee Titans
3	69	Damien Lewis	G	Seattle Seahawks
3	83	Lloyd Cushenberry	C	Denver Broncos
3	97	Jacob Phillips	ILB	Cleveland Browns
4	108	Saahdiq Charles	OT	Washington Redskins
4	131	Rashard Lawrence	DT	Arizona Cardinals
6	185	Blake Ferguson	LS	Miami Dolphins
7	251	Stephen Sullivan	TE	Seattle Seahawks
Undrafted	free agent	Derrick Dillon	WR	New York Giants
Undrafted	free agent	Michael Divinity	LB	Tampa Bay Buccaneers
Undrafted	free agent	Breiden Fehoko	DL	Los Angeles Chargers
Undrafted	free agent	Adrian Magee	OT	New Orleans Saints
Undrafted	free agent	Thaddeus Moss	TE	Washington Redskins
Undrafted	free agent	Badara Traore	OT	Chicago Bears

An additional 18 players from the 2019 LSU team were drafted by the NFL in 2021, 2022, and 2023.

Players drafted in 2021 were Ja'Marr Chase (round 1, pick 5 overall), Terrace Marshall Jr. (2, 59), Tyler Shelvin (4, 122), Racey McMath (6, 205), JaCoby Stevens (6, 224), and Kary Vincent Jr. (7, 237).

In 2022, players drafted were Derek Stingley Jr. (round 1, pick 3 overall), Ed Ingram (2, 59), Cor'Dale Flott (3, 81), Tyrion Davis-Price (3, 93), Cade York (4, 124), Neil Farrell Jr. (4, 126), Damone Clark (5, 176), Austin Deculus (6, 205), Chasen Hines (6, 210), and Andre Anthony (7, 248).

The two players on the 2019 LSU team drafted in 2023 were Anthony Bradford (round 4, pick 108 overall) and Jay Ward (4, 134).
