= Fehoko =

Fehoko is a surname. Notable people with the surname include:

- Breiden Fehoko (born 1996), American football player
- Simi Fehoko (born 1997), American football player
- Viliami Fehoko (born 1999), American football player
