= Adrian Magee =

American football player (born 1996)

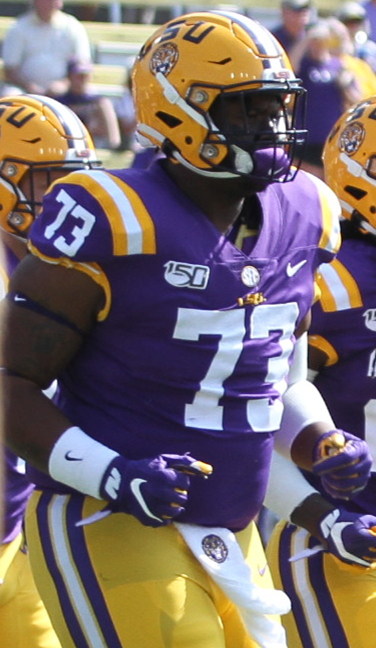

Profile
- Position: Offensive guard

Personal information
- Born: November 13, 1996 (age 29)
- Listed height: 6 ft 4 in (1.93 m)
- Listed weight: 343 lb (156 kg)

Career information
- High school: Franklinton (LA)
- College: LSU
- NFL draft: 2020: undrafted

Career history
- New Orleans Saints (2020)*
- * Offseason or practice squad member only

Awards and highlights
- CFP national champion (2019); Second-team All-SEC (2019)

Adrian Magee (born November 13, 1996) is an American former football offensive guard. He played college football at LSU.

== Early life ==
Magee attended Franklinton High School in Franklinton, Louisiana, joining the team the year after they won a Class 4A state title. He was an all-state selection at Franklinton High. Magee was considered a four-star recruit when he signed with LSU. His cousin is running back Terrence Magee.

== College career ==
Magee redshirted his freshman season in 2015 after a foot injury in practice. When Magee arrived at LSU, he acquired the reputation as a jokester who sometimes fell asleep in practice. Since he rarely played, he impersonated opponents on the scout team. He played in three games as redshirt freshman in 2016. On April 25, 2017, Magee was arrested for burglary after he stole an Xbox, video games, flip flops, a speaker, and cash, and he was indefinitely suspended. He confessed to the burglary, returned some items, and the charges were dropped. After being reinstated to the football team, Magee earned his first start as a sophomore against Auburn and became a part of the rotation. He earned the nickname "Jiggly Puff".

As a junior, Magee started the first game against Miami (Fla.) In the first quarter of the game, he injured his knee and missed a month of playing time. He finished the season starting four games in three different positions, playing one game each at left and right tackle and two starts at left guard after Garrett Brumfield was hurt. Despite preferring to play offensive tackle, Magee learned more about sliding inside and handling defensive lineman, citing it as important in his development. By the start of preseason practice in 2019, Magee competed with Chasen Hines for the starting role at left guard, splitting time in the first game and Magee starting every game since. In the matchup against Vanderbilt, Magee made a double pancake block that went viral. Magee was named to the Second-team All-SEC as a senior. In the Peach Bowl win over Oklahoma, Magee switched to right guard after Damien Lewis was injured.

== Professional career ==
Magee was signed by the New Orleans Saints as an undrafted free agent following the 2020 NFL draft on April 29, 2020. He was waived on August 2, 2020.
