= Jay Ward (American football) =

American football player (born 2000)

No. 24 – Minnesota Vikings
- Position: Safety
- Roster status: Active

Personal information
- Born: July 13, 2000 (age 26); Moultrie, Georgia, U.S.
- Listed height: 6 ft 1 in (1.85 m)
- Listed weight: 190 lb (86 kg)

Career information
- High school: Colquitt County (Moultrie)
- College: LSU (2019–2022)
- NFL draft: 2023: 4th round, 134th overall pick

Career history
- Minnesota Vikings (2023–present)

Awards and highlights
- NCAA Division I national champion (2020)

Career NFL statistics as of Week 10, 2026
- Total tackles: 50
- Fumble recoveries: 2
- Pass deflections: 1
- Stats at Pro Football Reference

Jay Ward (born July 13, 2000) is an American professional football safety for the Minnesota Vikings of the National Football League (NFL). The Minnesota Vikings selected Ward in the fourth round of the 2023 NFL draft. He played college football for the LSU Tigers.

== Early life ==
Ward was born in Moultrie, Georgia. He had two brothers who also played football up to the collegiate level. He attended Colquitt County High School and was one of the school's all-time best defensive backs, recording a career total of 11 interceptions. As a senior, Ward helped the team compile a regular season record of 14–0 before losing in the state championship. He also competed in track and field, winning a regional championship. A three-star prospect, he had initially committed to play college football for the Kentucky Wildcats, but then switched to the LSU Tigers.

== College career ==
Ward saw immediate playing time as a true freshman in 2019, appearing in 13 games during the team's national championship season, mainly on special teams. After being part of a defense that allowed a record-breaking 623 passing yards in the season-opening upset loss to the Mississippi State Bulldogs in 2020, Ward experienced limited action in the subsequent games; however, he rebounded by blocking what would have been a game-tying field goal at the end of regulation by Arkansas in Week 6. He then forced a fumble against Alabama, posted an interception against Florida, and made two interceptions against Ole Miss to conclude the season. By the end of the year, he had played nine games, recorded 29 tackles and scored one touchdown (off an interception against Ole Miss).

In 2021, Ward moved from cornerback to safety and started all 11 games, posting 71 tackles, six pass deflections, two interceptions and one forced fumble. In 2022, he saw action at safety, nickel cornerback and outside cornerback. He appeared in a total of 13 games that year, starting nine, and posted 60 tackles, in addition to one interception and a fumble return for a touchdown. After the season, Ward declared for the NFL Draft.

== Professional career ==
Pre-draft measurables
Height	Weight	Arm length	Hand span	Wingspan	40-yard dash	10-yard split	20-yard split	20-yard shuttle	Three-cone drill	Vertical jump	Broad jump	Bench press
6 ft 0 3/4 in (1.85 m)	188 lb (85 kg)	32 1/2 in (0.83 m)	8 1/4 in (0.21 m)	6 ft 4 7/8 in (1.95 m)	4.55 s	1.53 s	2.60 s	4.35 s	7.31 s	36.0 in (0.91 m)	11 ft 1 in (3.38 m)	16 reps
All values from NFL Combine/Pro Day

The Minnesota Vikings drafted Ward in the fourth round, 134th overall, of the 2023 NFL draft. As a rookie, he appeared in all 17 games. He recorded one fumble recovery in the 2023 season.

== NFL career statistics ==
Legend
**Bold**	Career high

=== Regular season ===
Year	Team	Games		Tackles					Interceptions						Fumbles				
Year	Team	GP	GS	Cmb	Solo	Ast	Sck	TFL	Int	Yds	Avg	Lng	TD	PD	FF	Fmb	FR	Yds	TD
2023	MIN	17	0	8	5	3	0.0	0	0	0	0.0	0	0	0	0	0	**1**	0	0
2024	MIN	16	0	6	4	2	0.0	0	0	0	0.0	0	0	**1**	0	0	0	0	0
2025	MIN	17	5	**27**	**13**	**14**	0.0	**1**	0	0	0.0	0	0	0	0	0	**1**	0	0
Career		50	5	41	22	19	0.0	1	0	0	0.0	0	0	1	0	0	2	0	0

=== Postseason ===
Year	Team	Games		Tackles					Interceptions						Fumbles				
Year	Team	GP	GS	Cmb	Solo	Ast	Sck	TFL	Int	Yds	Avg	Lng	TD	PD	FF	Fmb	FR	Yds	TD
2024	MIN	1	0	0	0	0	0.0	0	0	0	0.0	0	0	0	0	0	0	0	0
Career		1	0	0	0	0	0.0	0	0	0	0.0	0	0	0	0	0	0	0	0
