= JaCoby Stevens =

American football player (born 1998)

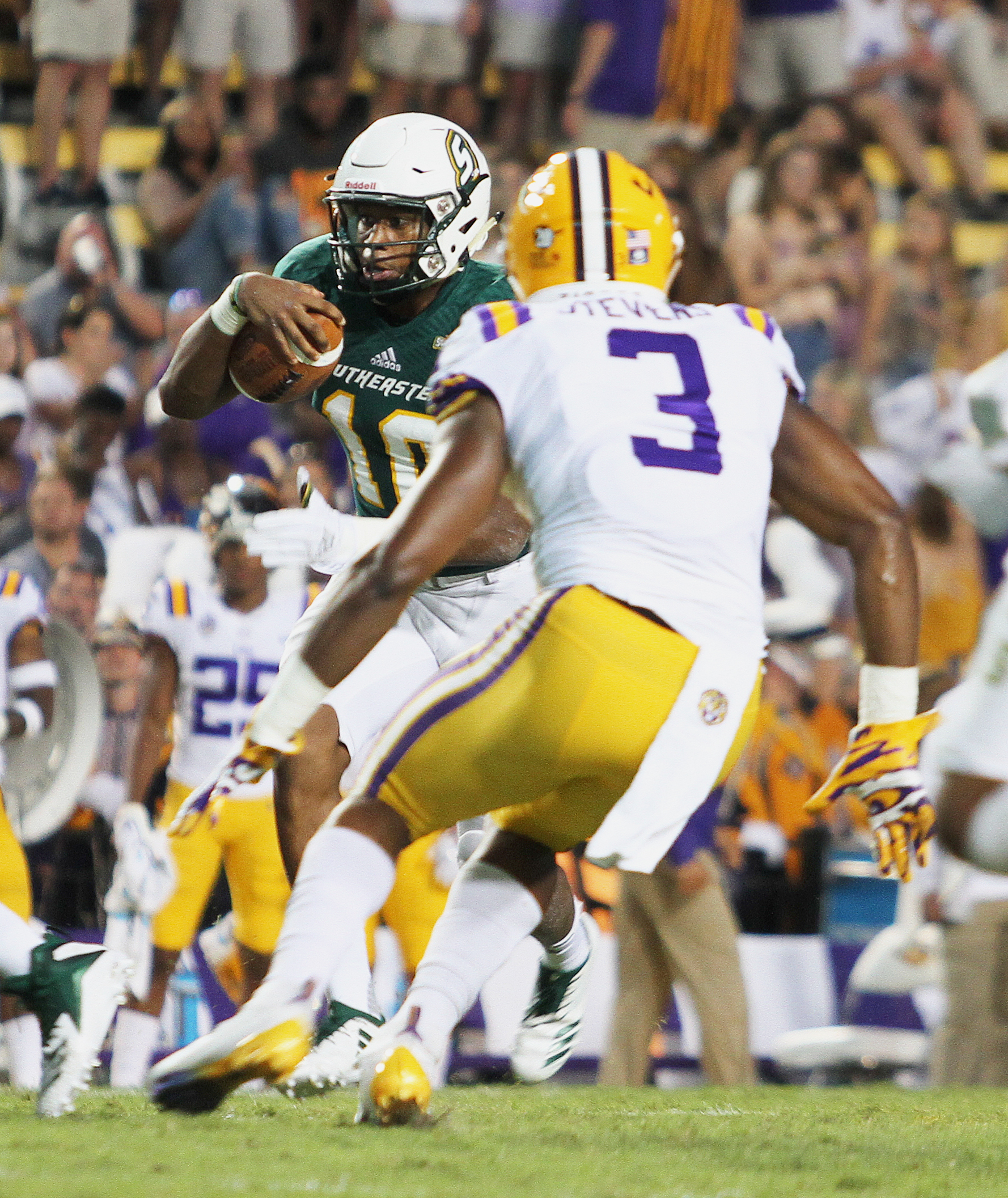
- Stevens with the LSU Tigers in 2018

LSU Tigers
- Title: Recruiting specialist

Personal information
- Born: June 19, 1998 (age 28); Murfreesboro, Tennessee, U.S.
- Listed height: 6 ft 1 in (1.85 m)
- Listed weight: 212 lb (96 kg)

Career information
- High school: Oakland (Murfreesboro)
- College: LSU (2017–2020)
- NFL draft: 2021: 6th round, 224th overall pick

Career history

Playing
- Philadelphia Eagles (2021)

Operations
- LSU (2023–present) Recruiting specialist

Awards and highlights
- CFP national champion (2019); Second-team All-SEC (2019)

Career NFL statistics
- Total tackles: 3
- Stats at Pro Football Reference

JaCoby Stevens (born June 19, 1998) is an American former professional football player who was a linebacker in the National Football League (NFL). He played college football for the LSU Tigers, where he is now a recruiting specialist.

== Early life ==
Stevens grew up in Murfreesboro, Tennessee, and attended The Ensworth School before transferring to Oakland High School after his freshman year. Stevens played both wide receiver and defensive back for Oakland and was also a member of the basketball team. As a junior, he recorded 84 tackles, 8.5 tackles for loss, six interceptions, two fumbles recovered and scored two defensive touchdowns on defense and caught 32 passes for 806 yards with 11 touchdowns and had three rushing touchdowns on offense. As a senior, he recorded 61 tackles with 9 interceptions on defense with 34 receptions for 689 yards and 12 touchdowns on offense and was named Tennessee's Mr. Football. Stevens was rated a five-star recruit and initially committed to play college football for the LSU Tigers over offers from Tennessee, Alabama, Auburn and Georgia. He decommitted during his senior season after the team fired head coach Les Miles, but ultimately re-committed.

== College career ==
Stevens played both safety and wide receiver as a true freshman, appearing in six games with one start at wide receiver and catching two passes for 32 yards. Stevens moved permanently to safety before his sophomore year and started the last four games of the season, recording 35 tackles, 6.5 tackles for loss, 1.5 sacks and an interception with five passes broken up. In his first full season as a starter, Stevens recorded 85 tackles, 8.5 tackles for loss and five sacks with three interceptions and nine passes defended and was named second-team All-Southeastern Conference by the league's coaches and helped LSU win the 2019 National Championship. After Ja'Marr Chase opted out for the 2020 season, Stevens was selected to wear the #7 jersey, which goes to the biggest playmaker on the team.

== Professional career ==
Pre-draft measurables
Height	Weight	Arm length	Hand span	40-yard dash	10-yard split	20-yard split	Vertical jump	Broad jump
6 ft 1 1/8 in (1.86 m)	212 lb (96 kg)	32 1/4 in (0.82 m)	9 1/8 in (0.23 m)	4.62 s	1.68 s	2.69 s	42.0 in (1.07 m)	10 ft 10 in (3.30 m)
All values from Pro Day

Stevens was selected in the sixth round with the 224th overall pick of the 2021 NFL draft by the Philadelphia Eagles. He signed his four-year rookie contract with Philadelphia on June 9, 2021, worth $3.6 million. Stevens was waived by Philadelphia as a part of final roster cuts on August 31, and was re-signed to the team's practice squad the next day. On January 2, 2022, Stevens made his NFL debut in the team's week 17 game against the Washington Football Team, collecting a tackle in the 20-16 victory. He signed a reserve/future contract with the Eagles on January 18.

On August 30, 2022, Stevens was waived by the Eagles.

== Coaching career ==
On August 3, 2023, Stevens joined the LSU football coaching staff.
