= Breiden Fehoko =

American football player (born 1996)

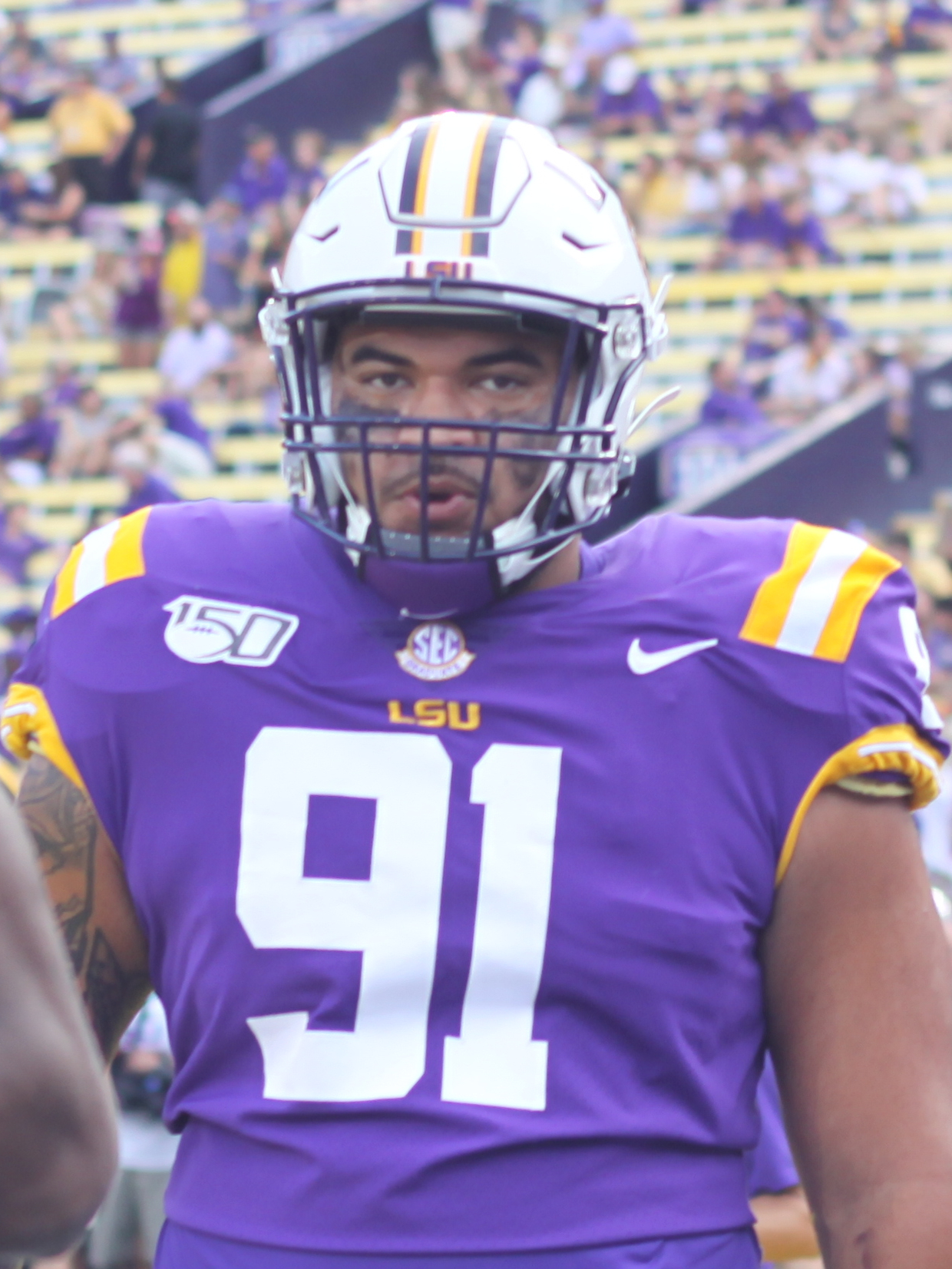
- Fehoko with the LSU Tigers in 2019

No. 96
- Position: Nose tackle

Personal information
- Born: October 15, 1996 (age 30); Honolulu, Hawaii, U.S.
- Listed height: 6 ft 3 in (1.91 m)
- Listed weight: 300 lb (136 kg)

Career information
- High school: Farrington (HI)
- College: Texas Tech (2015–2016); LSU (2017–2019)
- NFL draft: 2020: undrafted

Career history
- Los Angeles Chargers (2020–2022); Pittsburgh Steelers (2023–2024)

Awards and highlights
- CFP national champion (2019)

Career NFL statistics
- Total tackles: 36
- Sacks: 0
- Forced fumbles: 0
- Stats at Pro Football Reference

Breiden Fehoko (born October 15, 1996) is an American former professional football player who was a nose tackle in the National Football League (NFL). He played college football for the Texas Tech Red Raiders and LSU Tigers.

== College career ==
He played college football for the Texas Tech Red Raiders from 2015 to 2016, and for the LSU Tigers from 2017 to 2019. He was part of the 2019 LSU team that won the 2020 National Championship.

== Professional career ==
Pre-draft measurables
Height	Weight	Arm length	Hand span	Wingspan
6 ft 2 3/4 in (1.90 m)	301 lb (137 kg)	32 1/8 in (0.82 m)	9 3/4 in (0.25 m)	6 ft 4 1/4 in (1.94 m)
All values from Pro Day

=== Los Angeles Chargers ===
Fehoko signed with the Los Angeles Chargers as an undrafted free agent in 2020. He was waived on September 5, 2020, and signed to the practice squad the next day. Fehoko was elevated to the active roster on November 28 for the team's week 12 game against the Buffalo Bills, during which he made his NFL debut. He also played in the team's week 13 game against the New England Patriots, and reverted to the practice squad after both game. He signed a reserve/future contract with the Chargers on January 5, 2021.

On August 31, 2021, Fehoko was waived by the Chargers and re-signed to the practice squad the next day. He was promoted to the active roster on November 17, 2021. He made his first career NFL start on November 21, against the Pittsburgh Steelers.

Fehoko made the Chargers initial 53-man roster in 2022, but was waived on September 12, 2022 and re-signed to the practice squad. He was promoted to the active roster on November 9.

=== Pittsburgh Steelers ===
On April 4, 2023, Fehoko signed with the Pittsburgh Steelers. He was waived on August 29, and re-signed to the team's practice squad. He was promoted to the active roster on September 20. He was waived on November 13, and re-signed to the practice squad.

Fehoko was re-signed on March 8, 2024. He was placed on injured reserve on August 10, and was released with an injury settlement on August 15. He was re-signed to the practice squad on October 22.

On August 2, 2025, Fehoko re-signed with the Steelers. He was released on August 18.

On November 21, 2025, Fehoko announced his retirement from professional football.

== Personal life ==
He is the son of Vili and Linda Fehoko, and performed the Haka, a traditional Māori dance, with family members prior to LSU football games and on Hard Knocks.

His cousin Simi Fehoko plays wide receiver in the NFL.
