= Andre Anthony =

American football player (born 1996)

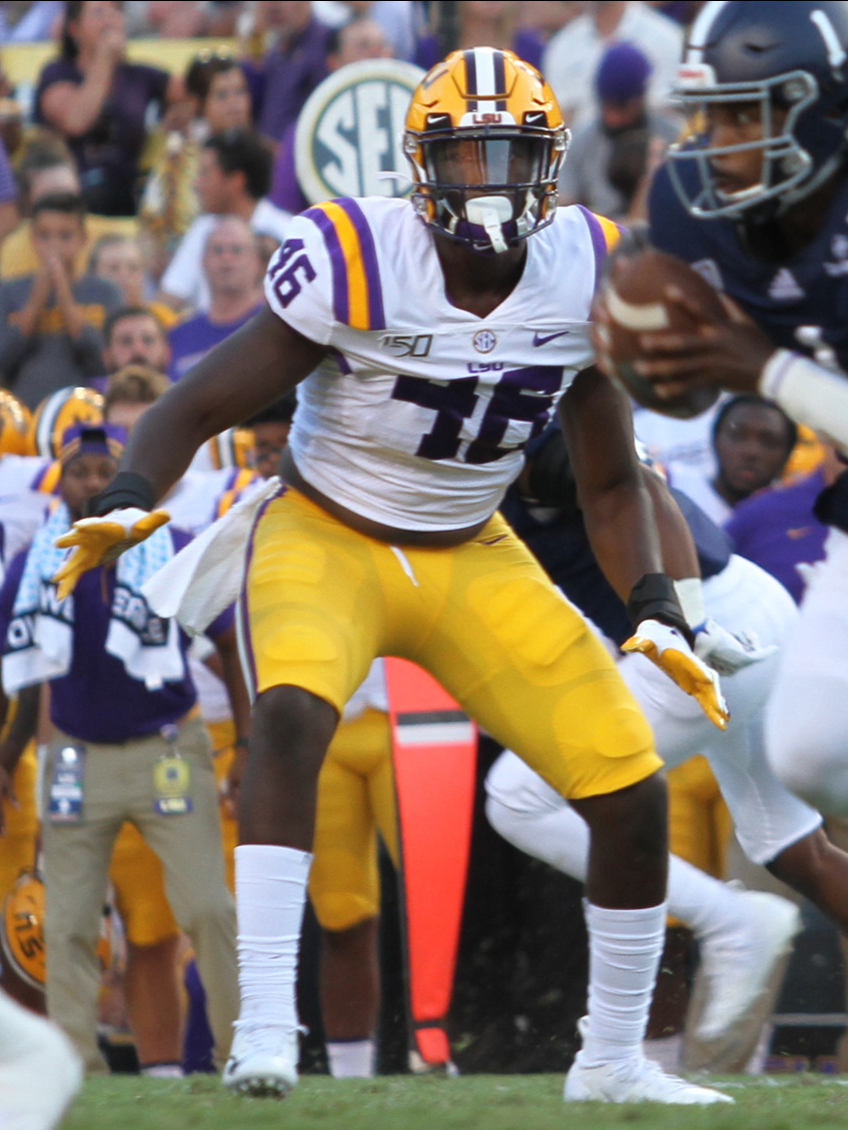
- Anthony with the LSU Tigers in 2019

No. 3, 46
- Positions: Defensive end, linebacker

Personal information
- Born: November 21, 1996 (age 29); New Orleans, Louisiana, U.S.
- Listed height: 6 ft 4 in (1.93 m)
- Listed weight: 251 lb (114 kg)

Career information
- High school: Edna Karr (New Orleans)
- College: LSU (2016–2021)
- NFL draft: 2022: 7th round, 248th overall pick

Career history
- Tampa Bay Buccaneers (2022)*; Chicago Bears (2022)*
- * Offseason or practice squad member only

Awards and highlights
- CFP national champion (2019)
- Stats at Pro Football Reference

Andre Anthony (born November 21, 1996) is an American former professional football player who was a defensive end in the National Football League (NFL). He played college football for the LSU Tigers. He is currently the new head coach at Bonnabel High School in Kenner, Louisiana.

== College career ==
Anthony redshirted his first year at Louisiana State University due to issues with his academic transcripts. In 2017, he was sidelined by a Lisfranc injury. He returned in 2018, appearing in 13 games with three starts, recording 14 tackles and half a sack. The following season, he contributed to LSU's national championship run, playing in nine games, starting twice, and finishing with nine tackles and one sack. In 2020, Anthony started eight games, leading the team with 5.5 sacks and recording 24 total tackles. In the 2021 season, he suffered a knee injury, which ended his final season early.

== Professional career ==
Pre-draft measurables
Height	Weight	Arm length	Hand span	40-yard dash	10-yard split	20-yard split	Bench press
6 ft 3 1/4 in (1.91 m)	245 lb (111 kg)	33 5/8 in (0.85 m)	9 3/4 in (0.25 m)	4.78 s	1.68 s	2.68 s	21 reps
All values from Pro Day

=== Tampa Bay Buccaneers ===
Anthony was selected by the Tampa Bay Buccaneers in the seventh round, 248th overall, of the 2022 NFL draft. He was waived on August 30, 2022.

=== Chicago Bears ===
Anthony signed with the Chicago Bears practice squad on September 12, 2022. His contract with the team expired when he was not re-signed.
