= Charles Turner III =

American football player (born 2001)

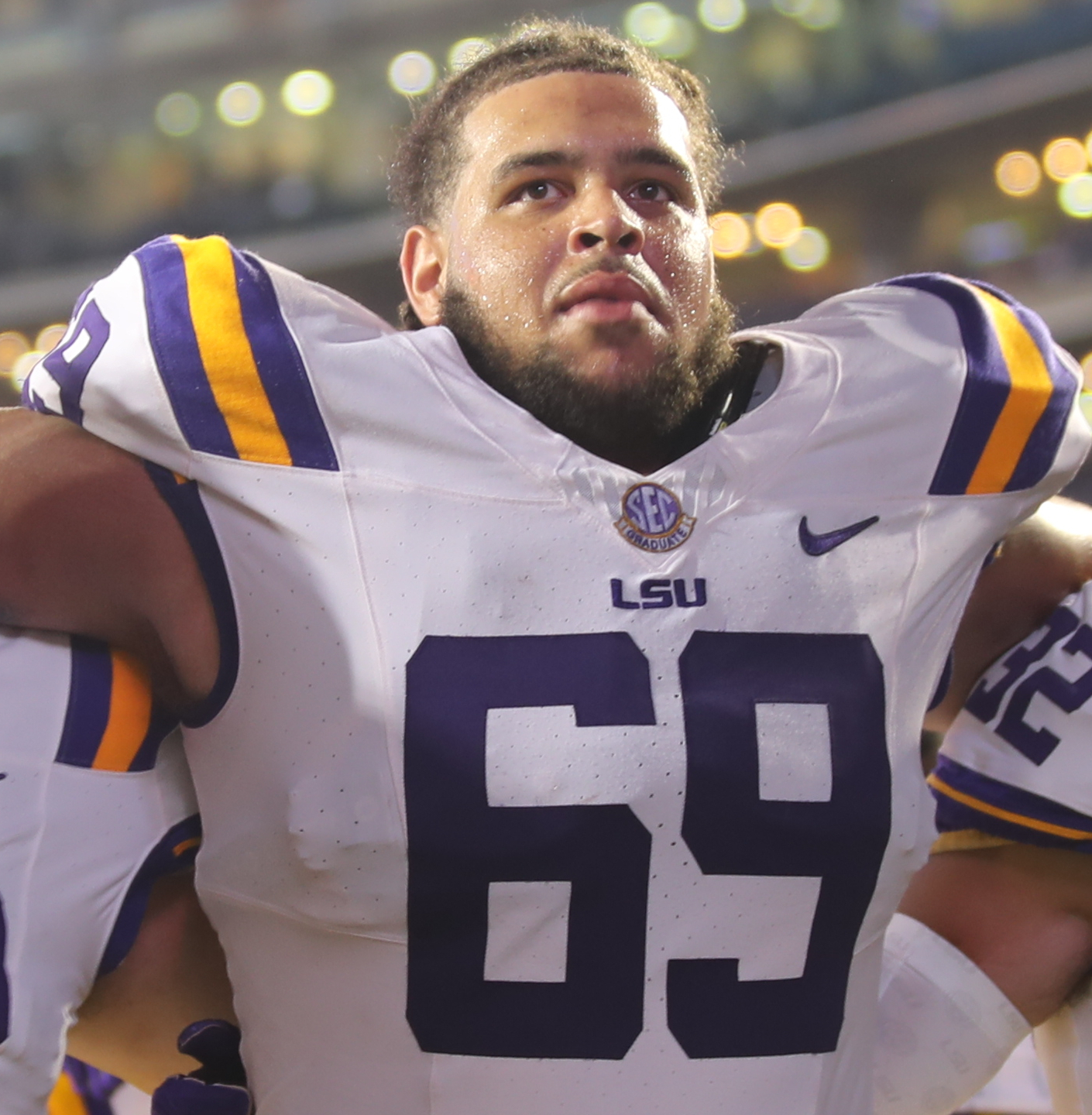
- Turner with the LSU Tigers in 2023

Vegas Knight Hawks
- Position: Center

Personal information
- Born: June 14, 2001 (age 25); Canton, Ohio, U.S.
- Listed height: 6 ft 4 in (1.93 m)
- Listed weight: 303 lb (137 kg)

Career information
- High school: IMG Academy (Bradenton, Florida)
- College: LSU (2019–2023)
- NFL draft: 2024: undrafted

Career history
- New England Patriots (2024)*; DC Defenders (2025)*
- * Offseason or practice squad member only
- Stats at Pro Football Reference

Charles Turner III (born June 14, 2001) is an American professional football center for the Vegas Knight Hawks of the Indoor Football League (IFL). He played college football for the LSU Tigers.

== Early life ==
Turner attended high school at IMG Academy. Coming out of high school, Turner was rated as a three-star recruit where he held offers from schools such as LSU, Florida, Auburn, Michigan, Nebraska, Pitt, Missouri, Kentucky, Minnesota, Rutgers, and North Carolina. Turner ultimately decided to commit to play college football for the LSU Tigers.

== College career ==
In Turner's first season in 2019, he would play in three games as he would redshirt, as he helped the Tigers win the National Championship that season. During the 2020 season, Turner played in eight games with no starts. In 2021, Turner played in four games with one start. During the 2022 season, Turner would play in and start all twelve games for the Tigers. In week seven of the 2023 season, Turner was named the Outland Trophy National Player of the Week for his performance against the Auburn Tigers. In week eleven, Turner was named the SEC offensive lineman of the week after he helped LSU to 701 total yards of offense and a 52-35 win over Florida. During the 2023 season, Turner played in and started all 13 games for the Tigers. After the conclusion of the 2023 season, Turner declared for the 2024 NFL draft.

In Turner's career with the Tigers, he played in 40 games making 25 starts across five seasons.

== Professional career ==
Pre-draft measurables
Height	Weight	Arm length	Hand span	40-yard dash	20-yard shuttle	Three-cone drill	Vertical jump	Broad jump	Bench press
6 ft 3 5/8 in (1.92 m)	303 lb (137 kg)	34 in (0.86 m)	9 3/8 in (0.24 m)	5.55 s	4.62 s	7.88 s	31.0 in (0.79 m)	9 ft 1 in (2.77 m)	22 reps
All values from NFL Combine/Pro Day

=== New England Patriots ===
Turner went undrafted in the 2024 NFL draft and was signed shortly after by the New England Patriots. He was released on August 26.

=== DC Defenders ===
On March 8, 2025, Turner signed with the DC Defenders of the United Football League (UFL). He was released on March 20, 2025.

Vegas Knight Hawks

On December 22, 2025, Turner signed with the Vegas Knight Hawks of the Indoor Football League (IFL).
