= Racey McMath =

American football player (born 1999)

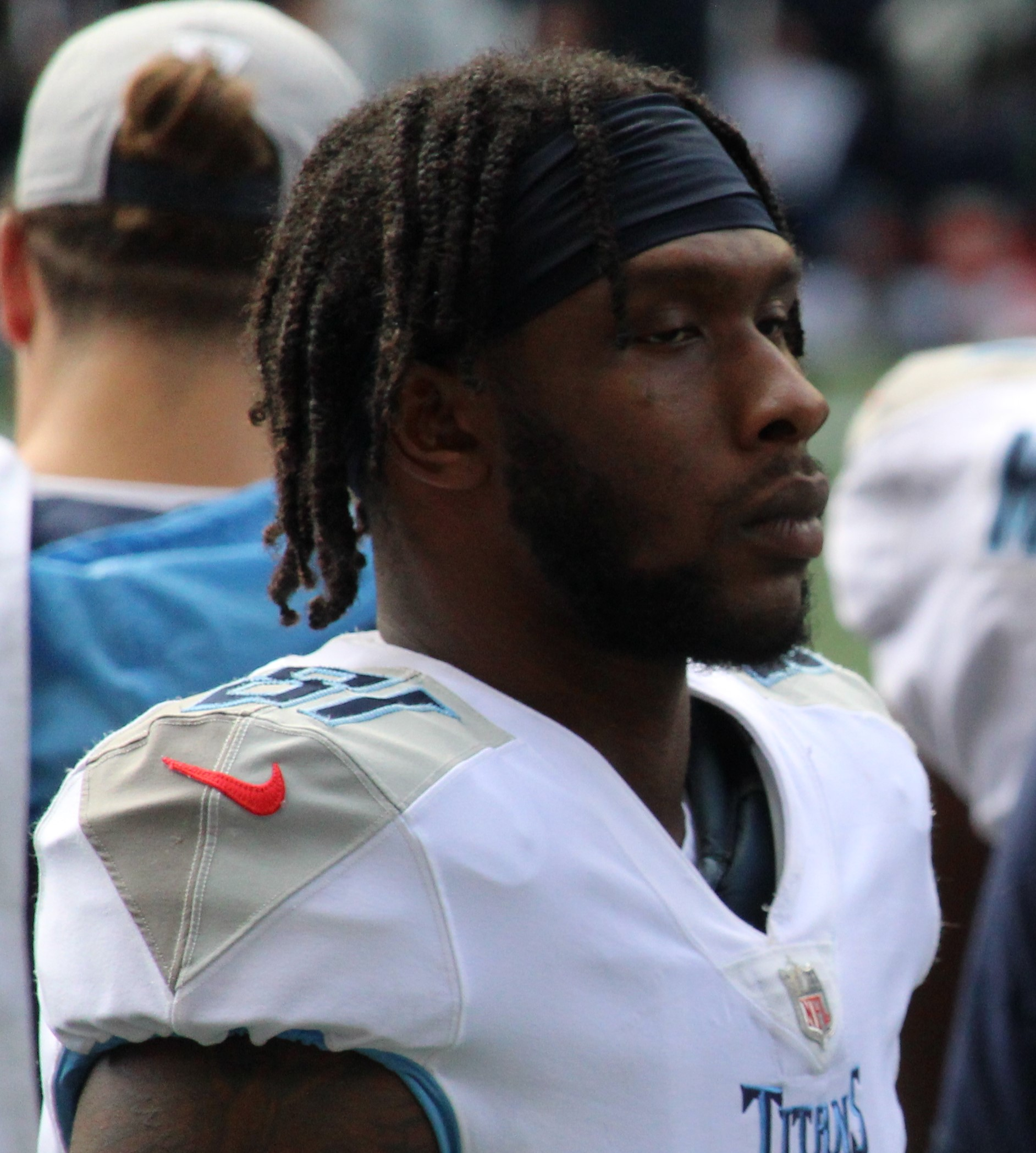
- McMath with the Tennessee Titans in 2021

Profile
- Position: Wide receiver

Personal information
- Born: June 14, 1999 (age 27); New Orleans, Louisiana, U.S.
- Listed height: 6 ft 2 in (1.88 m)
- Listed weight: 211 lb (96 kg)

Career information
- High school: Edna Karr (New Orleans)
- College: LSU (2017–2020)
- NFL draft: 2021: 6th round, 205th overall pick

Career history
- Tennessee Titans (2021–2022); Indianapolis Colts (2023)*; Dallas Cowboys (2023–2024)*; San Antonio Brahmas (2025)
- * Offseason or practice squad member only

Career NFL statistics as of 2023
- Receptions: 4
- Receiving yards: 48
- Receiving touchdowns: 0
- Stats at Pro Football Reference

Racey James McMath (born June 14, 1999) is an American professional football wide receiver. He played college football at LSU. He was selected by the Tennessee Titans in the sixth round of the 2021 NFL draft.

== College career ==
McMath played for the LSU Tigers from 2017 until 2020. He played in 34 games while recording over 33 catches for 522 yards and four touchdowns. On December 29, 2020, McMath declared for the 2021 NFL draft.

== Professional career ==
Pre-draft measurables
Height	Weight	Arm length	Hand span	40-yard dash	10-yard split	20-yard split	20-yard shuttle	Three-cone drill	Vertical jump	Broad jump
6 ft 2 1/2 in (1.89 m)	211 lb (96 kg)	32 in (0.81 m)	8 7/8 in (0.23 m)	4.39 s	1.59 s	2.59 s	4.40 s	7.37 s	34.0 in (0.86 m)	10 ft 5 in (3.18 m)
All values from Pro Day

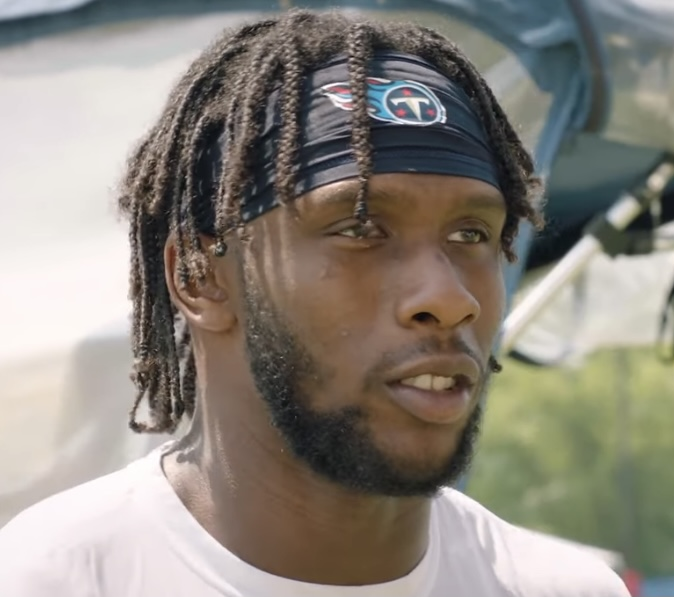
McMath in 2021

=== Tennessee Titans ===
McMath was drafted by the Tennessee Titans in the sixth round, 205th overall, of the 2021 NFL draft. He signed his four-year rookie contract with the Titans on May 17, 2021. McMath was placed on injured reserve on October 8. He was activated on December 11. In nine appearances for the Titans during his rookie campaign, McMath posted two catches for eight yards.

On August 31, 2022, McMath was placed on injured reserve. He was activated on December 10. In five appearances for Tennessee, McMath logged two receptions for 40 yards.

On August 29, 2023, McMath was waived by the Titans.

=== Indianapolis Colts ===
On August 31, 2023, McMath was signed to the practice squad of the Indianapolis Colts. He was released by the Colts on October 17.

=== Dallas Cowboys ===
On January 4, 2024, McMath was signed to the Dallas Cowboys' practice squad. He signed a reserve/future contract with Dallas on January 15. McMath was waived by the Cowboys on August 27.

=== San Antonio Brahmas ===
On November 21, 2024, McMath was signed by the San Antonio Brahmas of the United Football League (UFL).

== Personal life ==
Racey was born on June 14, 1999, to Pam and James McMath. His parents named him Racey because during his mother's pregnancy, he never stayed still. Pam said, "it felt like he was just racing in my stomach, so we said, 'ok, that's going to be his name – let's call him Racey.' "
