= Chasen Hines =

American football player (born 2000)

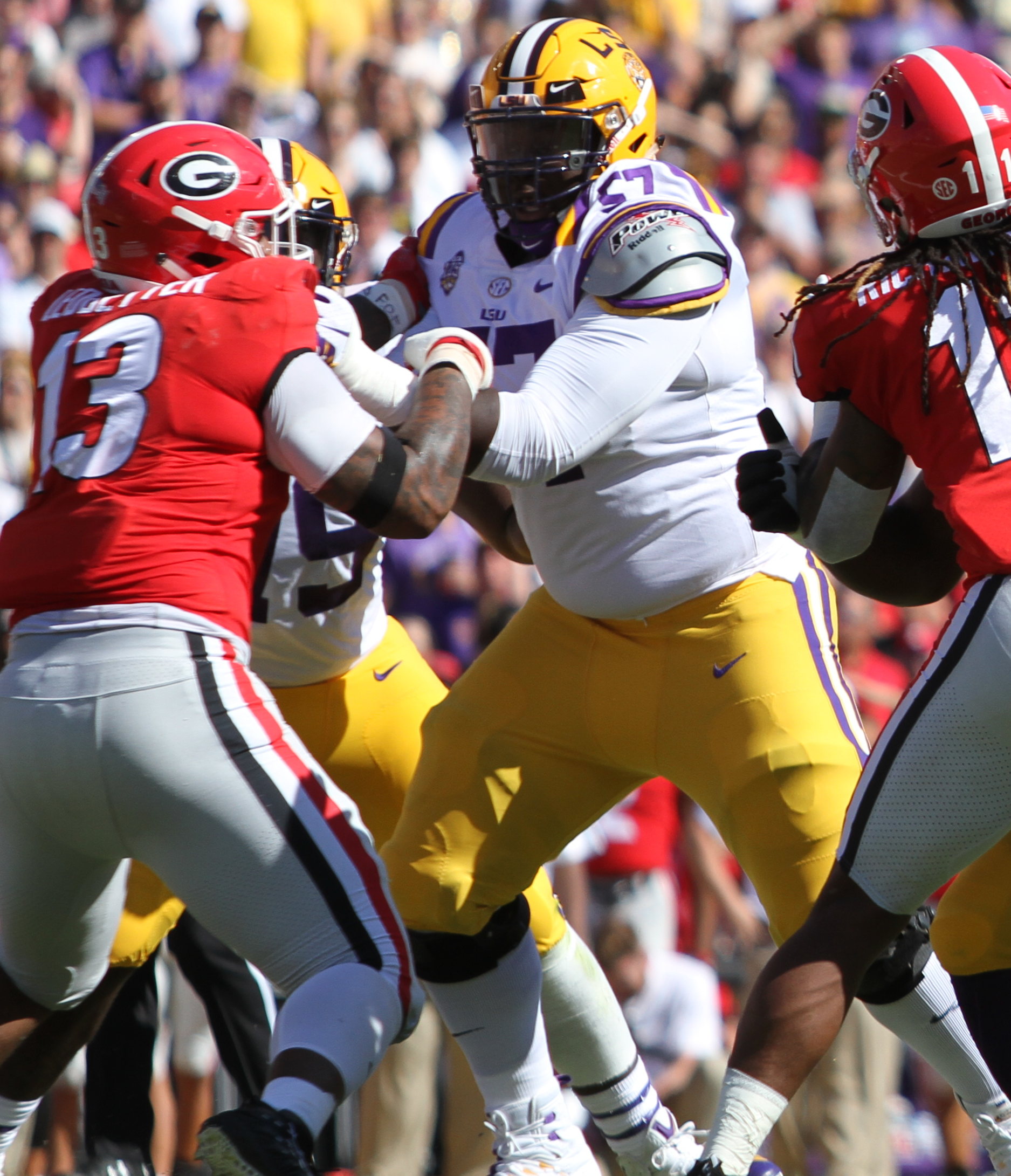
- Hines with the LSU Tigers in 2018

Profile
- Position: Guard

Personal information
- Born: April 3, 2000 (age 26); Marshall, Texas, U.S.
- Listed height: 6 ft 3 in (1.91 m)
- Listed weight: 335 lb (152 kg)

Career information
- High school: Marshall
- College: LSU (2018–2021)
- NFL draft: 2022: 6th round, 210th overall pick

Career history
- New England Patriots (2022); Miami Dolphins (2023–2024)*
- * Offseason or practice squad member only

Awards and highlights
- CFP national champion (2019)
- Stats at Pro Football Reference

Chasen Hines (born April 3, 2000) is an American professional football guard. He played college football for the LSU Tigers.

== Early life and college ==
Hines played baseball in his youth. He played until he was a junior in high school. However, he eventually gained a love for football. He played football for his last two years at Marshall High School. He was a four-star recruit defensive tackle. After his senior season, he chose to play for the LSU Tigers and he was switched from a defensive tackle to an offensive guard. He played for them all four years, playing in 35 games and starting in 17 games.

== Professional career ==
Pre-draft measurables
Height	Weight	Arm length	Hand span	Wingspan	40-yard dash	10-yard split	20-yard split	20-yard shuttle	Three-cone drill	Vertical jump	Broad jump	Bench press
6 ft 2 3/4 in (1.90 m)	327 lb (148 kg)	33 7/8 in (0.86 m)	9 7/8 in (0.25 m)	6 ft 9 3/8 in (2.07 m)	5.22 s	1.73 s	2.96 s	5.00 s	8.46 s	30.5 in (0.77 m)	9 ft 0 in (2.74 m)	20 reps
All values from NFL Combine/Pro Day

=== New England Patriots ===
Hines was selected by the New England Patriots with the 210th pick in the sixth round of the 2022 NFL draft. He was placed on injured reserve on October 29, 2022. He was released on August 29, 2023.

=== Miami Dolphins ===
On August 31, 2023, the Miami Dolphins signed Hines to their practice squad. He signed a reserve/future contract on January 15, 2024.

Hines was waived by the Dolphins on August 27, 2024, and re-signed to the practice squad. He signed a reserve/future contract on January 7, 2025.

On May 8, 2025, Hines was waived by the Dolphins.

=== Birmingham Stallions ===
On October 7, 2025, Hines signed with the Birmingham Stallions of the United Football League (UFL).
