= Damien Lewis (American football) =

American football player (born 1997)

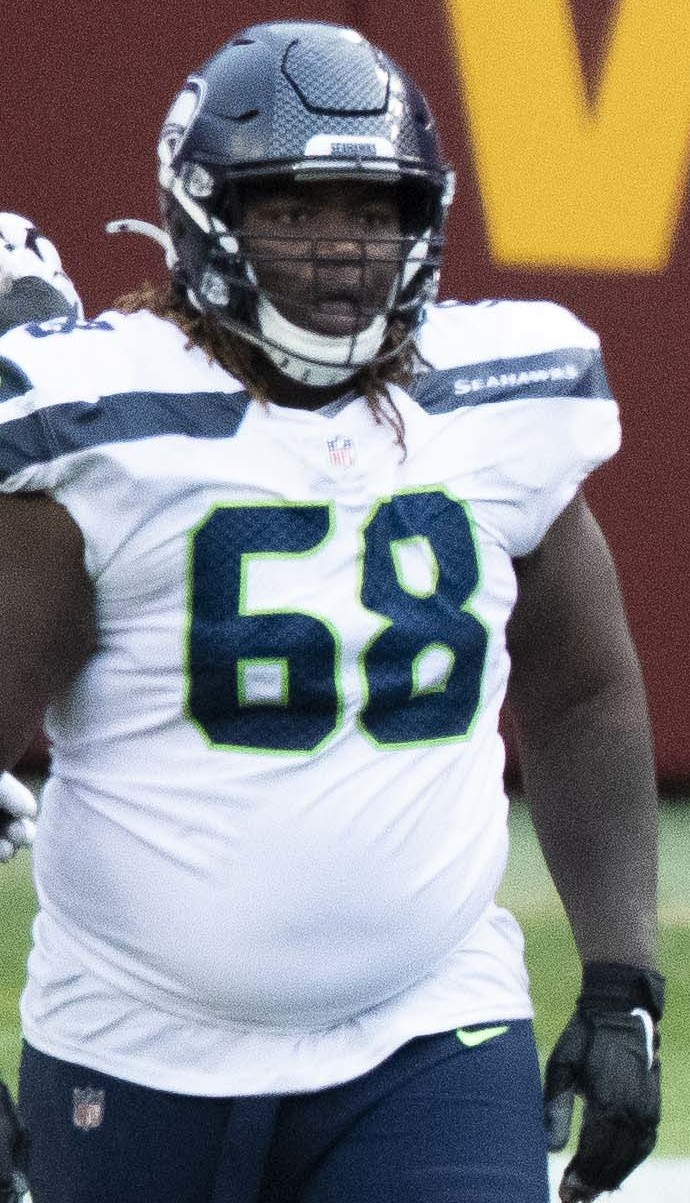
- Lewis with the Seattle Seahawks in 2020

No. 68 – Carolina Panthers
- Position: Guard
- Roster status: Active

Personal information
- Born: March 21, 1997 (age 29); Canton, Mississippi, U.S.
- Listed height: 6 ft 2 in (1.88 m)
- Listed weight: 335 lb (152 kg)

Career information
- High school: Canton
- College: Northwest Mississippi CC (2016–2017); LSU (2018–2019)
- NFL draft: 2020: 3rd round, 69th overall pick

Career history
- Seattle Seahawks (2020–2023); Carolina Panthers (2024–present)

Awards and highlights
- PFWA All-Rookie Team (2020); CFP national champion (2019); Second-team All-SEC (2019)

Career NFL statistics as of 2025
- Games played: 93
- Games started: 93
- Stats at Pro Football Reference

Damien Stephon Lewis (born March 21, 1997) is an American professional football guard for the Carolina Panthers of the National Football League (NFL). He played college football for the LSU Tigers. He was selected by the Seattle Seahawks in the third round of the 2020 NFL draft.

== Early life ==
Lewis grew up in Biloxi, Mississippi and Atlanta before moving to Canton, Mississippi, where he attended Canton High School. Projected not to qualify academically to play Division I football, Lewis received no offers from four-year colleges after high school.

== College career ==
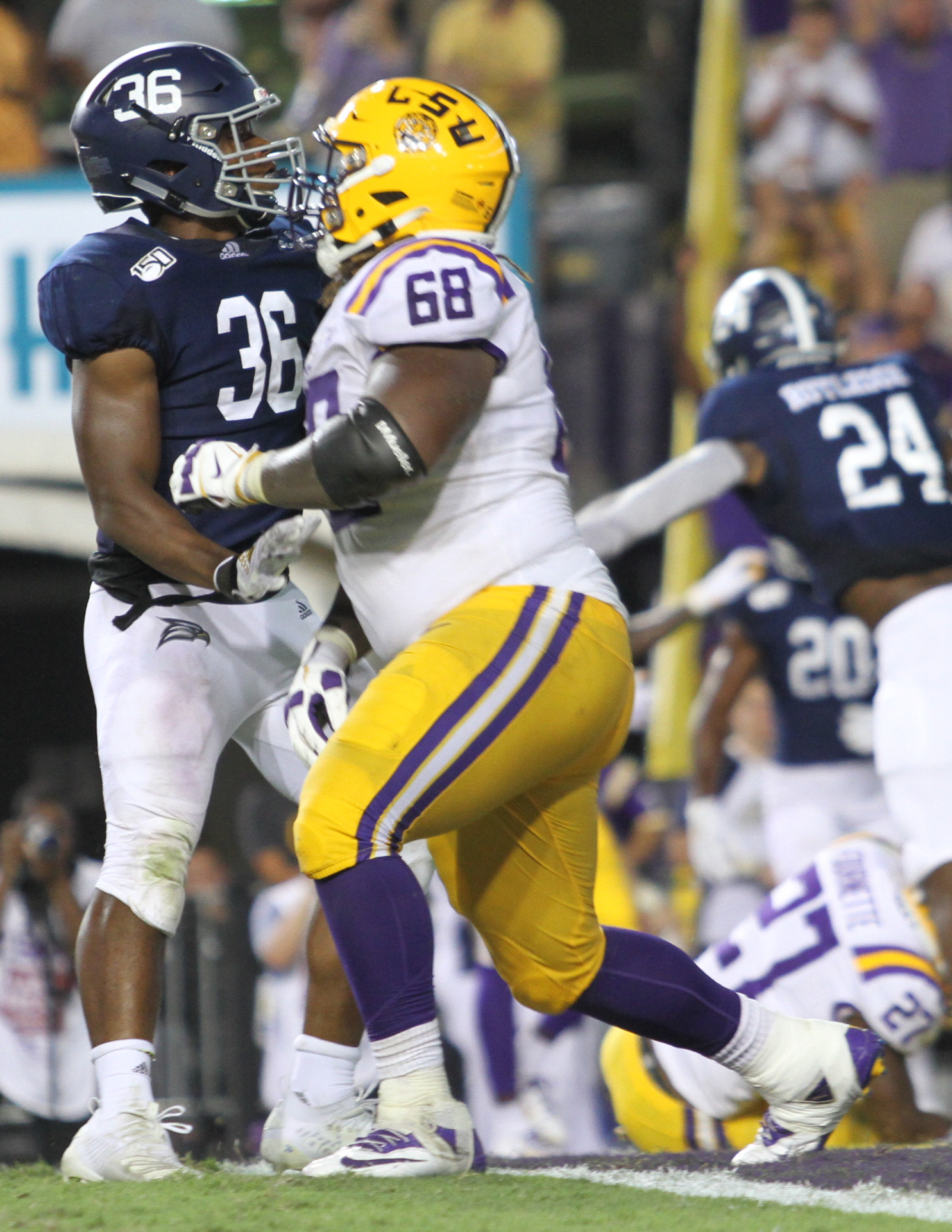
Lewis at LSU in 2019

Lewis enrolled at Northwest Mississippi Community College after receiving a scholarship. He was named a second-team Junior College All-American in both of his seasons at Northwest Mississippi. He graduated a semester early and committed to transfer to LSU to continue his collegiate career over offers from Ole Miss, Kentucky, South Carolina, and West Virginia.

Lewis was named the Tigers starting right guard going into his first season at LSU and started all 13 of the team's games. As a senior, Lewis started all 15 of the Tigers' games and was named second-team All-Southeastern Conference as the Tigers won the 2020 National Championship.

== Professional career ==
Pre-draft measurables
Height	Weight	Arm length	Hand span	Wingspan	40-yard dash	10-yard split	20-yard split	Vertical jump	Broad jump	Bench press	Wonderlic
6 ft 2 in (1.88 m)	327 lb (148 kg)	33 in (0.84 m)	10 1/4 in (0.26 m)	6 ft 7 1/2 in (2.02 m)	5.24 s	1.83 s	3.03 s	30.0 in (0.76 m)	9 ft 0 in (2.74 m)	27 reps	11
All values from NFL Combine

=== Seattle Seahawks ===
Lewis was selected by Seattle Seahawks in the third round with the 69th overall pick in the 2020 NFL draft.

Lewis made his NFL debut on September 13, 2020, in the season opener against the Atlanta Falcons, starting at right guard and playing all 62 of the Seahawks' offensive snaps. Though Lewis dealt with a few minor injuries, he was able to start all 16 regular season games as well as the Seahawks' Wild Card loss to the Los Angeles Rams. He logged 967 offensive snaps, including snaps in a game in Week 11 against the Arizona Cardinals where he was the emergency center. In pass protection ratings, Lewis did well, allowing just 28 total pressures in 633 pass blocking snaps. However, he did accumulate 12 penalties, which led all NFL guards. In terms of run blocking, however, Lewis was one of the best in the league. He received an 81.5 overall run blocking score from Pro Football Focus, second only to Indianapolis Colts All-Pro and Pro Bowler Quenton Nelson. After a strong rookie year, Lewis was named to the Pro Football Writers Association's NFL All-Rookie Team.

=== Carolina Panthers ===
On March 13, 2024, Lewis signed a four-year contract with the Carolina Panthers. On September 25, it was announced that Lewis had suffered a torn ulnar collateral ligament in his left elbow, but would likely avoid injured reserve as he attempts to play through the injury.

Lewis was named the starting left guard in 2025, starting 16 games and leading the team in offensive snaps.

== Personal life ==
Lewis is a Christian. He is married and has three children.

== NFL career statistics ==
Legend
**Bold**	Career high

Year	Team	Games		Offense					
Year	Team	GP	GS	Snaps	Pct	Holding	False start	Decl/Pen	Acpt/Pen
2020	SEA	**16**	**16**	967	91%	**5**	**2**	2	**9**
2021	SEA	13	13	697	93%	3	1	0	4
2022	SEA	16	16	**1,005**	97%	3	0	1	6
2023	SEA	16	16	931	95%	1	1	0	4
2024	CAR	16	16	943	98%	1	1	**3**	3
2025	CAR	16	16	988	**100%**	3	2	0	5
Career		93	93	5,531	-	16	7	5	29
