= The Dissertation =

The Dissertation may refer to:

- The Dissertation (novel), a 1972 novel by R. M. Koster
- The Dissertation (1832), a Croatian national revival manifesto
- dissertation, an academic document also called thesis
