= 2019 Georgia Bulldogs football team =

American college football season

2019 Georgia Bulldogs football

SEC Eastern Division champion Sugar Bowl champion

SEC Championship Game, L 10–37 vs. LSU

Sugar Bowl, W 26–14 vs. Baylor
- Conference: Southeastern Conference
- Eastern Division

Ranking
- Coaches: No. 4
- AP: No. 4
- Record: 12–2 (7–1 SEC)
- Head coach: Kirby Smart (4th season)
- Offensive coordinator: James Coley (1st season)
- Offensive scheme: Pro-style
- Defensive coordinator: Dan Lanning (1st season)
- Co-defensive coordinator: Glenn Schumann (1st season)
- Base defense: 3–4
- Home stadium: Sanford Stadium

Uniform
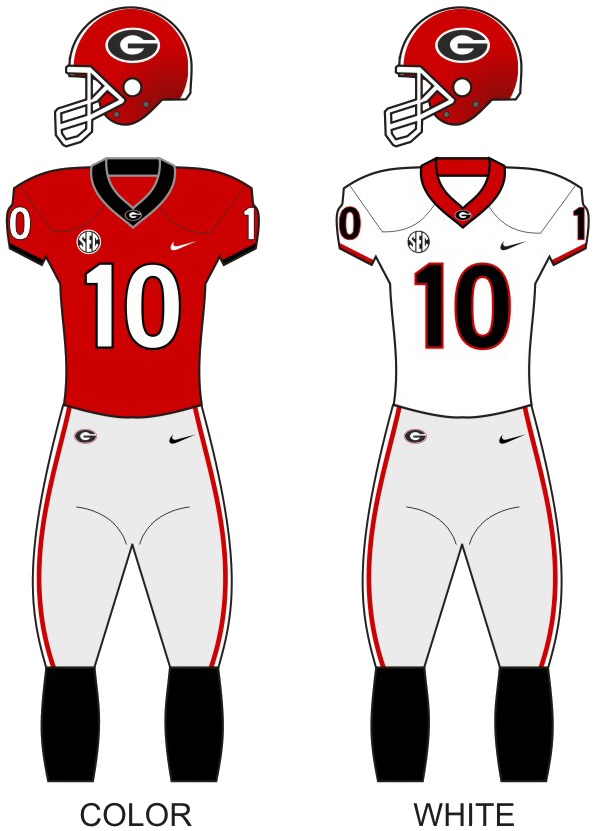

2019 Southeastern Conference football standings
	Conf.			Overall
Team	W		L	W		L
Eastern Division
No. 4 Georgia x	7	–	1	12	–	2
No. 6 Florida	6	–	2	11	–	2
Tennessee *	5	–	3	8	–	5
Kentucky	3	–	5	8	–	5
Missouri *	3	–	5	6	–	6
South Carolina	3	–	5	4	–	8
Vanderbilt	1	–	7	3	–	9
Western Division
No. 1 LSU x$#^	8	–	0	15	–	0
No. 8 Alabama	6	–	2	11	–	2
No. 14 Auburn	5	–	3	9	–	4
Texas A&M	4	–	4	8	–	5
Mississippi State	3	–	5	6	–	7
Ole Miss	2	–	6	4	–	8
Arkansas	0	–	8	2	–	10
Championship: LSU 37, Georgia 10
# – College Football Playoff champion; ^ – College Football Playoff participant; $ – Conference champion; x – Division champion/co-champions; * – Tennessee vacated all wins due to NCAA violations. Missouri was ineligible for postseason due to NCAA sanctions.; Rankings from AP Poll

The 2019 Georgia Bulldogs football team represented the University of Georgia in the 2019 NCAA Division I FBS football season. The Bulldogs played their home games at Sanford Stadium in Athens, Georgia, and competed in the Eastern Division of the Southeastern Conference (SEC). They were led by fourth-year head coach Kirby Smart.

Georgia began the year ranked third in the AP Poll, and were considered the favorite to represent the East Division in the SEC Championship Game for a third consecutive year. On September 21, the team secured a win over then-No. 7 Notre Dame, 23–17. They suffered their first loss of the year when they were upset by unranked South Carolina at home. Georgia rebounded with wins over highly ranked rivals No. 6 Florida and No. 12 Auburn, and ended the regular season atop the East Division with an 11–1 record, 7–1 in SEC play, and ranked fourth in the College Football Playoff rankings. In the SEC Championship Game, Georgia fell to West Division champion and eventual national champion LSU, 37–10. Georgia fell out of contention for the Playoff and received a bid to the Sugar Bowl to play Big 12 Conference runner-up Baylor, which Georgia won 26–14. The Bulldogs were ranked fourth in the season's final polls.

Georgia led FBS in scoring defense, but was 49th in scoring offense. Safety J. R. Reed and offensive tackle Andrew Thomas were named consensus All-Americans. Kicker Rodrigo Blankenship was the recipient of the Lou Groza Award as the nation's best placekicker. Quarterback Jake Fromm led the team in passing with 2,860 yards and 24 touchdowns. Running back D'Andre Swift led the team in rushing with 1,218 yards.

== Preseason ==
=== SEC Media Days ===
The 2019 SEC Media Days were held July 15–18 in Birmingham, Alabama. In the preseason media poll, Georgia was projected to repeat as East Division champion and SEC runner-up.

=== Preseason All-SEC teams ===
The Bulldogs had eleven players selected to the preseason all-SEC teams.

Offense

1st team

D'Andre Swift – RB

Andrew Thomas – OL

2nd team

Jake Fromm – QB

Solomon Kindley – OL

Isaiah Wilson – OL

3rd team

Charlie Woerner – TE

Ben Cleveland – OL

Defense

1st team

J. R. Reed – DB

3rd team

Tyler Clark – DL

Richard LeCounte – DB

Specialists

1st team

Rodrigo Blankenship – K

== Schedule ==
Georgia announced its 2019 football schedule on September 18, 2018. The 2019 schedule consisted of seven home and four away games in the regular season along with a neutral site game.

Date	Time	Opponent	Rank	Site	TV	Result	Attendance
August 31	7:30 p.m.	at Vanderbilt	No. 3	Vanderbilt Stadium; Nashville, TN (rivalry, SEC Nation)	ESPN	W 30–6	40,350
September 7	4:00 p.m.	Murray State*	No. 3	Sanford Stadium; Athens, GA	ESPN2	W 63–17	92,746
September 14	12:00 p.m.	Arkansas State*	No. 3	Sanford Stadium; Athens, GA	ESPN2	W 55–0	92,746
September 21	8:00 p.m.	No. 7 Notre Dame*	No. 3	Sanford Stadium; Athens, GA (College GameDay)	CBS	W 23–17	93,246
October 5	7:00 p.m.	at Tennessee	No. 3	Neyland Stadium; Knoxville, TN (rivalry, SEC Nation)	ESPN	W 43–14	92,709
October 12	12:00 p.m.	South Carolina	No. 3	Sanford Stadium; Athens, GA (rivalry)	ESPN	L 17–20 ^{2OT}	92,746
October 19	6:00 p.m.	Kentucky^{†}	No. 10	Sanford Stadium; Athens, GA	ESPN	W 21–0	92,746
November 2	3:30 p.m.	vs. No. 6 Florida	No. 8	TIAA Bank Field; Jacksonville, FL (rivalry, SEC Nation)	CBS	W 24–17	84,789
November 9	7:30 p.m.	Missouri	No. 6	Sanford Stadium; Athens, GA	ESPN	W 27–0	92,746
November 16	3:30 p.m.	at No. 12 Auburn	No. 4	Jordan–Hare Stadium; Auburn, AL (Deep South's Oldest Rivalry)	CBS	W 21–14	87,451
November 23	3:30 p.m.	Texas A&M	No. 4	Sanford Stadium; Athens, GA (SEC Nation)	CBS	W 19–13	92,746
November 30	12:00 p.m.	at Georgia Tech*	No. 4	Bobby Dodd Stadium; Atlanta, GA (Clean, Old-Fashioned Hate)	ABC	W 52–7	55,000
December 7	4:00 p.m.	vs. No. 2 LSU	No. 4	Mercedes-Benz Stadium; Atlanta, GA (SEC Championship Game, College GameDay, SEC Nation)	CBS	L 10–37	74,150
January 1, 2020	8:45 p.m.	vs. No. 7 Baylor*	No. 5	Mercedes-Benz Superdome; New Orleans, LA (Sugar Bowl)	ESPN	W 26–14	55,211
*Non-conference game; ^{†}Homecoming; Rankings from AP Poll and CFP Rankings after November 5 released prior to game; All times are in Eastern time

== Roster ==
2019 Georgia Bulldogs football team roster
Players
Coaches
Offense

Pos.	#	Name	Class
WR	1	George Pickens	Fr
QB	2	D'Wan Mathis	Fr
RB	3	Zamir White	Fr
RB	4	James Cook	So
WR	5	Matt Landers	So
RB	6	Kenny McIntosh	Fr
RB	7	D'Andre Swift	Jr
WR	8	Dominick Blaylock	Fr
QB	9	Nathan Priestly	Fr
WR	10	Kearis Jackson	Fr
QB	11	Jake Fromm	Jr
WR	12	Tommy Bush	Fr
QB	13	Stetson Bennett	So
WR	14	Trey Blount	Jr
WR	15	Lawrence Cager	GS
WR	16	Demetris Robertson	Jr
QB	16	John Seter	So
WR	17	Josh Moran	Jr
TE	17	Eli Wolf	GS
TE	18	Brett Seither	Fr
WR	19	Makiya Tongue	Fr
RB	20	Sevaughn Clark	Fr
QB	22	Jes Sutherland	GS
WR	23	Willie Erdman	Jr
RB	24	Prather Hudson	Jr
WR	26	Patrick Burke	Jr
RB	28	Anthony Summey	Fr
RB	29	Darius Jackson	So
WR	31	Reid Tulowitzky	So
WR	32	Ty James	Fr
RB	33	Ian Donald-McIntyre	Jr
RB	35	Brian Herrien	Sr
RB	36	Garrett Jones	Fr
WR	37	Patrick Bond	Fr
RB	39	K. J. McCoy	Fr
TE	42	Mitchell Werntz	So
OL	43	Chase Harof	Jr
TE	44	Peyton Mercer	Fr
TE	48	Jarrett Freeland	Fr
OL	49	Koby Pyrz	Jr
OL	50	Warren Ericson	Fr
OL	54	Justin Shaffer	Jr
OL	55	Trey Hill	So
OL	57	Daniel Gothard	Jr
OL	58	Hayden Rubin	Fr
OL	60	Clay Webb	Fr
OL	61	Blake Watson	Fr
OL	64	David Vann	Fr
OL	64	J. C. Vega	Fr
OL	66	Solomon Kindley	Jr
OL	67	Caleb Jones	Fr
OL	69	Jamaree Salyer	So
OL	70	Warren McClendon	Fr
OL	71	Andrew Thomas	Jr
OL	73	Xavier Truss	Fr
OL	74	Ben Cleveland	Jr
OL	75	Owen Condon	Fr
OL	78	D'Marcus Hayes	Sr
OL	79	Isaiah Wilson	So
WR	81	Jaylen Johnson	Fr
TE	82	Kolby Wyatt	So
WR	85	Cameron Moore	So
TE	86	John FitzPatrick	Fr
WR	87	Tyler Simmons	Sr
TE	88	Ryland Goede	Fr
TE	89	Charlie Woerner	Sr

Defense

Pos.	#	Name	Class
DB	1	Divaad Wilson	Fr
DB	2	Richard LeCounte	Jr
DB	3	Tyson Campbell	So
LB	4	Nolan Smith	Fr
DL	5	Julian Rochester	Sr
DB	6	Otis Reese IV	So
DB	7	Tyrique Stevenson	Fr
DB	9	Ameer Speed	So
DL	10	Malik Herring	Jr
LB	11	Jermaine Johnson II	Jr
LB	12	Rian Davis	Fr
OLB	13	Azeez Ojulari	Fr
DB	14	D. J. Daniel	Jr
LB	15	Trezmen Marshall	Fr
DB	16	Lewis Cine	Fr
LB	17	Nakobe Dean	Fr
LB	19	Adam Anderson	So
DB	20	J. R. Reed	Sr
LB	22	Nate McBride	Jr
DB	23	Mark Webb	Jr
OLB	24	Matthew Brown	Fr
LB	25	Quay Walker	So
DB	26	Tyrique McGhee	Sr
DB	27	Eric Stokes	So
DB	29	Christopher Smith II	So
LB	30	Tae Crowder	Sr
DB	31	William Poole	Jr
LB	32	Monty Rice	Jr
LB	33	Robert Beal Jr.	So
DB	36	Latavious Brini	So
DB	37	Jordon McKinney	Jr
LB	38	Aaron Olalude	Jr
DB	39	Hugh Nelson	Fr
ILB	41	Channing Tindall	So
DB	42	Jake Skole	So
DB	43	Tyler Beaver	Sr
DL	44	Travon Walker	Fr
DL	45	Bill Norton	Fr
DB	46	Jake Wilson	Fr
DB	47	Dan Jackson	Fr
LB	51	David Marshall	Sr
DL	52	Tyler Clark	Sr
LB	55	Miles Miccichi	Fr
DL	72	Netori Johnson	So
DL	76	Michail Carter	Sr
OLB	84	Walter Grant	Jr
LB	88	Jaden Hunter	So
DL	90	Tramel Walthour	So
DL	91	Tymon Mitchell	Fr
DL	92	Justin Young	Sr
DL	93	Antonio Poole	Sr
DT	94	Michael Barnett	Sr
DL	95	Devonte Wyatt	Jr
DL	96	Zion Logue	Fr
DL	97	Tyler Malakius	Fr
DL	99	Jordan Davis	So

Special teams

Pos.	#	Name	Class
LS	47	Payne Walker	Fr
LS	56	William Mote	Fr
LS	59	Steven Nixon	GS
K/P	90	Jake Camarda	So
P	92	Landon Stratton	Sr
P	93	Bill Rubright	So
K/P	95	Noah Chumley	Fr
K	96	Jack Podlesny	Fr
K	97	Brooks Buce	So
K	98	Rodrigo Blankenship	Sr

Head coach

- Kirby Smart

Coordinators/assistant coaches

- James Coley – Offensive coordinator/Quarterbacks
- Dan Lanning – Defensive coordinator/outside linebackers
- Glenn Schumann – Co-defensive coordinator/inside linebackers
- Scott Fountain – Special teams coordinator
- Dell McGee – Run game coordinator/running backs
- Cortez Hankton– Pass game coordinator/wide receivers
- Tray Scott – Defensive line
- Sam Pittman – Offensive line/assistant head coach
- Todd Hartley – Tight ends
- Charlton Warren – Defensive backs
- Scott Sinclair – Director, strength and conditioning
- Rodney Price – Assistant, strength and conditioning
- Maurice Sims – Assistant, strength and conditioning
- Ben Sowders – Assistant, strength and conditioning
- Tersoo Uhaa – Assistant, strength and conditioning
- Buster Faulkner – Quality control, offense
- Derron Montgomery – Quality control, offense
- Austin Armstrong – Quality control, defense
- Jules Montinar – Quality control, defense
- Dan O'Brien – Quality control, defense
- Matt Godwin – Quality control, personnel
- Josh Lee – Director, football operations
- Jay Chapman – Assistant director of football operations
- Anna Courson – Assistant, football operations
- Quinton Mino – Assistant, football operations
- Jonas Jennings – Director, player development
- Patrick Bastien – Assistant director, player development
- Fernando Velasco – Assistant director, player development
- Austin Chambers – Assistant, player development
- Luke Moore – Director, player personnel
- Mike Cavan – Special assistant to the head coach
- Ann Hunt – Administrative associate to the head coach
- Marshall Malchow – Director, recruiting
- Christina Harris – Director, recruiting administration
- Bryant Gantt – Director, player wellness
- John Meshad – Director, player equipment
- Jake Stroot – Director, football technology
- Collier Madaleno – Director, football performance nutrition
- Meaghan Turcotte – Football sports nutritionist
- Greg Meyer – Special teams analyst
- Aaron Auer – Intern, offense
- Montgomery VanGorder – Intern, offense
- Nathan Bryant – Intern, defense
- Hannah Brinks – Director, football creative design
- Eric Black – Director, of football creative design
- Frank Martin – Co-director, of football creative design

Legend

- (C) Team captain
- (S) Suspended
- (I) Ineligible
- Injured
- Redshirt

Roster
Last update: 9/1/21

== Game summaries ==
=== At Vanderbilt ===
#3 Georgia Bulldogs at Vanderbilt Commodores

Quarter	1	2	3	4	Total
#3 Georgia	14	7	3	6	30
Vanderbilt	0	6	0	0	6

at Vanderbilt Stadium, Nashville, Tennessee

- Date: August 31, 2019
- Game time: 7:30 pm
- Game attendance: 40,350
- TV announcers (ESPN): Tom Hart, Jordan Rodgers and Cole Cubelic
- Recap, Box Score

Game information

First quarter

- UGA – Demetris Robinson 3-yard pass from Jake Fromm (Rodrigo Blankenship kick), 11:01. #3 Georgia 7–0. Drive: 8 plays, 75 yards, 3:59.
- UGA – James Cook 18-yard run (Rodrigo Blankenship kick), 0:56. #3 Georgia 14–0. Drive: 10 plays, 89 yards, 5:34.

Second quarter

- UGA – Brian Herrien 1-yard run (Rodrigo Blankenship kick), 8:01. #3 Georgia 21–0. Drive: 7 plays, 80 yards, 4:03.
- VAN – Ryley Guay 26-yard field goal, 2:25. #3 Georgia 21–3. Drive: 12 plays, 73 yards, 5:36.
- VAN – Ryley Guay 46-yard field goal, 0:04. #3 Georgia 21–6. Drive: 7 plays, 52 yards, 1:06.

Third quarter

- UGA – Rodrigo Blankenship 50-yard field goal, 7:48. #3 Georgia 24–6. Drive: 8 plays, 56 yards, 5:23.

Fourth quarter

- UGA – Rodrigo Blankenship 37-yard field goal, 7:20. #3 Georgia 27–6. Drive: 5 plays, 20 yards, 2:21.
- UGA – Rodrigo Blankenship 31-yard field goal, 2:13. #3 Georgia 30–6. Drive: 8 plays, 31 yards, 3:23.

Top passers

- UGA – Jake Fromm – 15/23, 156 yards, TD
- VAN – Riley Neal – 14/25, 85 yards

Top rushers

- UGA – D'Andre Swift – 16 rushes, 147 yards
- VAN – Ke'Shawn Vaughn – 15 rushes, 74 yards

Top receivers

- UGA – Lawrence Cager – 2 receptions, 41 yards
- VAN – Ke'Shawn Vaughn – 3 receptions, 24 yards

=== Murray State ===
Murray State Racers at #3 Georgia Bulldogs

Quarter	1	2	3	4	Total
Murray State	7	0	10	0	17
#3 Georgia	7	35	7	14	63

at Sanford Stadium, Athens, Georgia

- Date: September 7, 2019
- Game time: 4:00 pm
- Game attendance: 92,746
- TV announcers (ESPN2): Rocky Boiman, Anthony Becht and Beth Mowins
- Recap, Box Score

Game information

First quarter

- UGA – D'Andre Swift 3-yard run (Rodrigo Blankenship kick), 13:37. #3 Georgia 7–0. Drive: 4 plays, 56 yards, 1:23.
- MURR – Daquon Green 60-yard pass from Preston Rice (Gabriel Vincente kick), 6:36. Tied 7–7. Drive: 3 plays, 72 yards, 1:26.

Second quarter

- UGA – Brian Herrien 2-yard run (Rodrigo Blankenship kick), 14:24. #3 Georgia 14–7. Drive: 7 plays, 78 yards, 2:38.
- UGA – J. R. Reed 14-yard fumble return (Rodrigo Blankenship kick), 13:51. #3 Georgia 21–7.
- UGA – D'Andre Swift 10-yard run (Rodrigo Blankenship kick), 9:07. #3 Georgia 28–7. Drive: 4 plays, 41 yards, 2:18.
- UGA – George Pickens 15-yard pass from Jake Fromm (Rodrigo Blankenship kick), 6:11. #3 Georgia 35–7. Drive: 3 plays, 80 yards, 0:46.
- UGA – Zamir White 6-yard run (Rodrigo Blankenship kick), 2:11. #3 Georgia 42–7. Drive: 4 plays, 36 yards, 1:34.

Third quarter

- MURR – Nigel Walton 35-yard interception return (Gabriel Vincente kick), 9:33. #3 Georgia 42–14.
- UGA – Demetris Robinson 15-yard pass from Stetson Bennett (Rodrigo Blankenship kick), 5:22. #3 Georgia 49–14. Drive: 8 plays, 75 yards, 4:11.
- MURR – Gabriel Vincente 26-yard field goal, 1:18. #3 Georgia 49–17. Drive: 10 plays, 66 yards, 4:04.

Fourth quarter

- UGA – Dominick Blaylock 25-yard pass from Stetson Bennett (Rodrigo Blankenship kick), 10:49. #3 Georgia 56–17. Drive: 12 plays, 75 yards, 5:29.
- UGA – Stetson Bennett 1-yard run (Rodrigo Blankenship kick), 7:42. #3 Georgia 63–17. Drive: 3 plays, 30 yards, 1:27.

Top passers

- MURR – Preston Rice – 20/25, 216 yards, TD
- UGA – Jake Fromm – 10/11, 166 yards, TD

Top rushers

- MURR – Rodney Castille – 5 rushes, 8 yards
- UGA – Zamir White – 8 rushes, 72 yards, TD

Top receivers

- MURR – Daquon Green – 5 receptions, 101 yards, TD
- UGA – George Pickens – 4 receptions, 78 yards, TD

=== Arkansas State ===
Arkansas State Red Wolves at #3 Georgia Bulldogs

Quarter	1	2	3	4	Total
Arkansas State	0	0	0	0	0
#3 Georgia	13	21	14	7	55

at Sanford Stadium, Athens, Georgia

- Date: September 14, 2019
- Game time: 12:00 pm
- Game attendance: 92,746
- TV announcers (ESPN2): Roy Philpott, Kelly Stouffer and Lauren Sisler
- Recap, Box Score

Game information

First quarter

- UGA – Brian Herrien 3-yard run (Rodrigo Blankenship kick), 9:02. #3 Georgia 7–0. Drive: 6 plays, 60 yards, 2:52.
- UGA – Rodrigo Blankenship 29-yard field goal, 5:28. #3 Georgia 10–0. Drive: 5 plays, 41 yards, 2:17.
- UGA – Rodrigo Blankenship 41-yard field goal, 1:08. #3 Georgia 13–0. Drive: 8 plays, 41 yards, 2:41.

Second quarter

- UGA – Dominick Blaylock 60-yard pass from Jake Fromm (Rodrigo Blankenship kick), 14:47. #3 Georgia 20–0. Drive: 3 plays, 68 yards, 0:52.
- UGA – D'Andre Swift 48-yard pass from Jake Fromm (Rodrigo Blankenship kick), 10:21. #3 Georgia 27–0. Drive: 5 plays, 89 yards, 2:14.
- UGA – Lawrence Cager 5-yard pass from Jake Fromm (Rodrigo Blankenship kick), 0:54. #3 Georgia 34–0. Drive: 7 plays, 66 yards, 1:37.

Third quarter

- UGA – James Cook 37-yard run (Rodrigo Blankenship kick), 12:02. #3 Georgia 41–0. Drive: 7 plays, 65 yards, 2:58.
- UGA – Zamir White 1-yard run (Rodrigo Blankenship kick), 4:20. #3 Georgia 48–0. Drive: 9 plays, 83 yards, 5:01.

Fourth quarter

- UGA – Kenny McIntosh 62-yard run (Rodrigo Blankenship kick), 9:07. #3 Georgia 55–0. Drive: 6 plays, 98 yards, 2:43.

Top passers

- ARST – Logan Bonner – 20/35, 124 yards
- UGA – Jake Fromm – 17/22, 279 yards, 3 TD

Top rushers

- ARST – DJ Chatman – 7 rushes, 24 yards
- UGA – D'Andre Swift – 9 rushes, 76 yards

Top receivers

- ARST – Jonathan Adams Jr – 7 receptions, 85 yards
- UGA – Dominick Blaylock – 4 receptions, 112 yards, TD

=== #7 Notre Dame ===
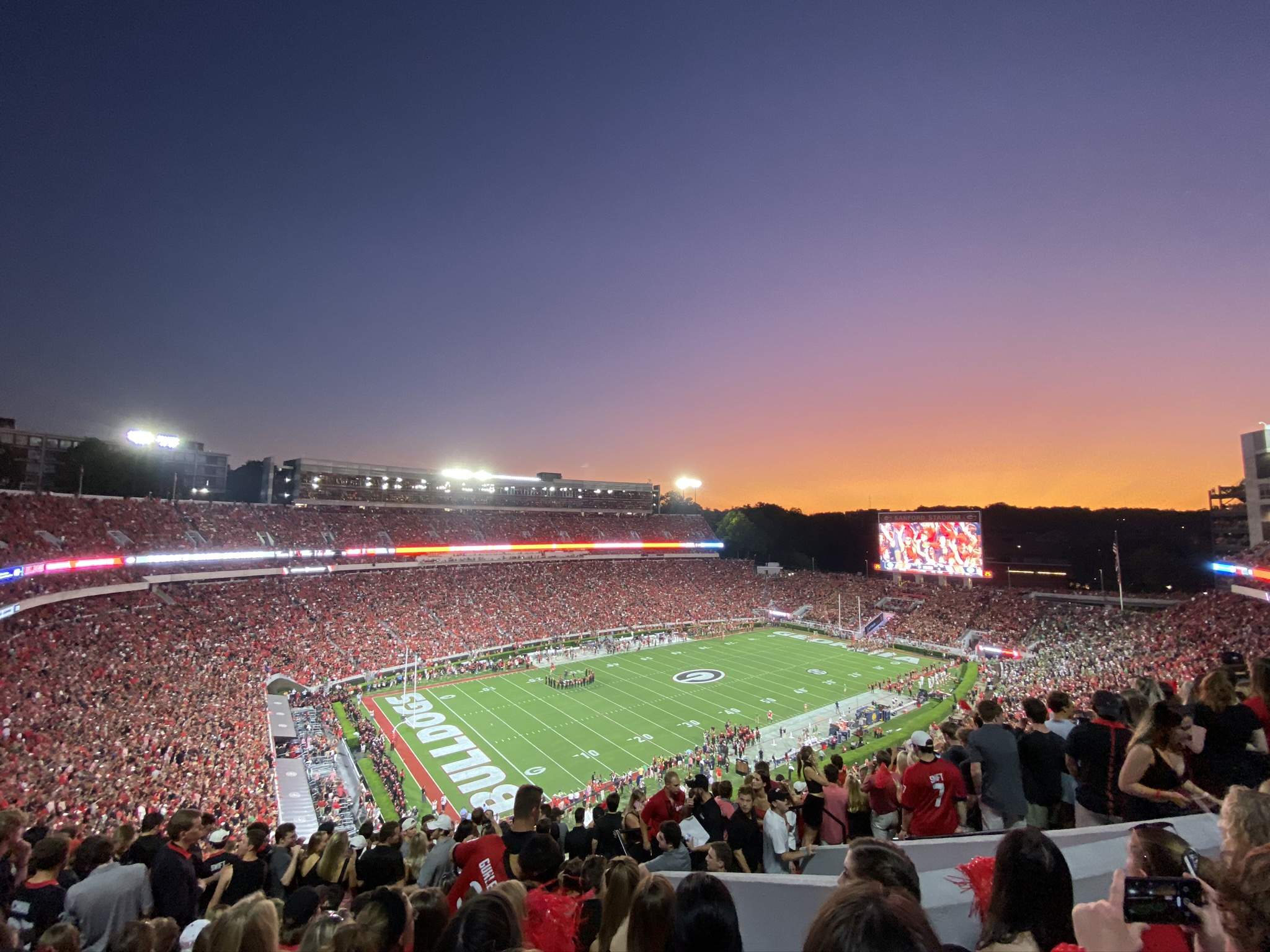
In the latest start time at Sanford Stadium since 1985, the Dawgs defeated #7 Notre Dame 23–17.

#7 Notre Dame Fighting Irish at #3 Georgia Bulldogs

Quarter	1	2	3	4	Total
#7 Notre Dame	0	10	0	7	17
#3 Georgia	0	7	6	10	23

at Sanford Stadium, Athens, Georgia

- Date: September 21, 2019
- Game time: 8:00 pm
- Game attendance: 93,246
- TV announcers (CBS): Brad Nessler and Gary Danielson
- Recap, Box Score

Game information

First quarter

- No scoring plays.

Second quarter

- ND – Cole Kmet 1-yard pass from Ian Book (Jonathan Doerer kick), 10:39. #7 Notre Dame 7–0. Drive: 5 plays, 8 yards, 1:43.
- UGA – D'Andre Swift 3-yard run (Rodrigo Blankenship kick), 2:27. Tied 7–7. Drive: 13 plays, 75 yards, 8:12.
- ND – Jonathan Doerer 27-yard field goal, 0:00. #7 Notre Dame 10–7. Drive: 8 plays, 66 yards, 2:27.

Third quarter

- UGA – Rodrigo Blankenship 40-yard field goal, 8:31. Tied 10–10. Drive: 4 plays, -1 yard, 1:27.
- UGA – Rodrigo Blankenship 31-yard field goal, 4:21. #3 Georgia 13–10. Drive: 7 plays, 53 yards, 2:36.

Fourth quarter

- UGA – Lawrence Cager 15-yard pass from Jake Fromm (Rodrigo Blankenship kick), 13:19. #3 Georgia 20–10. Drive: 8 plays, 82 yards, 3:59.
- UGA – Rodrigo Blankenship 43-yard field goal, 6:54. #3 Georgia 23–10. Drive: 7 plays, 41 yards, 4:17.
- ND – Chase Claypool 4-yard pass from Ian Book (Jonathan Doerer kick), 3:12. #3 Georgia 23–17. Drive: 10 plays, 75 yards, 3:42.

Top passers

- ND – Ian Book – 29/47, 275 yards, 2 TD, 2 INT
- UGA – Jake Fromm – 20/26, 187 yards, TD

Top rushers

- ND – Tony Jones Jr. – 9 rushes, 21 yards
- UGA – D'Andre Swift – 18 rushes, 98 yards, TD

Top receivers

- ND – Cole Kmet – 9 receptions, 108 yards, TD
- UGA – Lawrence Cager – 5 receptions, 82 yards, TD

=== At Tennessee ===
#3 Georgia Bulldogs at Tennessee Volunteers

Quarter	1	2	3	4	Total
#3 Georgia	10	16	3	14	43
Tennessee	7	7	0	0	14

at Neyland Stadium, Knoxville, Tennessee

- Date: October 6, 2019
- Game time: 7:00 pm
- Game attendance: 92,709
- TV announcers (ESPN): Sean McDonough, Todd Blackledge and Holly Rowe
- Recap, Box Score

Game information

First quarter

- UGA – D'Andre Swift 1-yard run (Rodrigo Blankenship kick), 7:07. #3 Georgia 7–0. Drive: 12 plays, 84 yards, 6:51.
- TENN – Marquez Callaway 73-yard pass from Brian Maurer (Brent Cimaglia kick), 6:25. Tied 7–7. Drive: 2 plays, 75 yards, 0:42.
- UGA – Rodrigo Blankenship 50-yard field goal, 2:34. #3 Georgia 10–7. Drive: 7 plays, 43 yards, 3:51.

Second quarter

- TENN – Jauan Jennings 12-yard pass from Brian Maurer (Brent Cimaglia kick), 14:57. Tennessee 14–10. Drive: 10 plays, 75 yards, 2:37.
- UGA – Rodrigo Blankenship 34-yard field goal, 11:31. Tennessee 14–13. Drive: 8 plays, 58 yards, 3:26.
- UGA – Lawrence Cager 3-yard pass from Jake Fromm (Rodrigo Blankenship kick), 1:59. #3 Georgia 20–14. Drive: 6 plays, 60 yards, 2:03.
- UGA – George Pickens 7-yard pass from Jake Fromm (pass failed), 0:09. #3 Georgia 26–14. Drive: 5 plays, 70 yards, 0:50.

Third quarter

- UGA – Rodrigo Blankenship 27-yard field goal, 7:03. #3 Georgia 29–14. Drive: 7 plays, 44 yards, 3:34.

Fourth quarter

- UGA – Brian Herrien 1-yard run (Rodrigo Blankenship kick), 8:02. #3 Georgia 36–14. Drive: 10 plays, 75 yards, 6:04.
- UGA – Tae Crowder 60-yard fumble return (Rodrigo Blankenship kick), 4:39. #3 Georgia 43–14.

Top passers

- UGA – Jake Fromm – 24/29, 288 yards, 2 TD
- TENN – Brian Maurer – 14/28, 259 yards, 2 TD, INT

Top rushers

- UGA – Brian Herrien – 11 rushes, 88 yards, TD
- TENN – Tim Jordan – 9 rushes, 47 yards

Top receivers

- UGA – D'Andre Swift – 4 receptions, 72 yards
- TENN – Jauan Jennings – 7 receptions, 114 yards, TD

=== South Carolina ===
South Carolina Gamecocks at #3 Georgia Bulldogs

Quarter	1	2	3	4	OT	2OT	Total
South Carolina	7	10	0	0	0	3	20
#3 Georgia	3	7	0	7	0	0	17

at Sanford Stadium, Athens, Georgia

- Date: October 12, 2019
- Game time: 12:00 pm
- Game weather: Temperature: 80 °F (27 °C) • Wind: SW 7 mph • Weather: Sunny
- Game attendance: 92,746
- Referee: Ken Williamson
- TV announcers (ESPN): Bob Wischusen and Dan Orlovsky
- Recap, Box Score

Game information

First quarter

- UGA – Rodrigo Blakenship 50-yard field goal, 10:15. #3 Georgia 3–0. Drive: 9 plays, 42 yards, 4:45.
- USC – Bryan Edwards 46-yard pass from Ryan Hilinski (Parker White kick), 1:58. South Carolina 7–3. Drive: 9 plays, 93 yards, 3:59.

Second quarter

- UGA – D'Andre Swift 1-yard run (Rodrigo Blankenship kick), 13:35. #3 Georgia 10–7. Drive: 9 plays, 75 yards, 3:23.
- USC – Parker White 49-yard field goal, 3:00. Tied 10–10. Drive: 7 plays, 30 yards, 2:31.
- USC – Israel Mukuamu 53-yard interception (Parker White kick), 1:00. South Carolina 17–10.

Third quarter

- No scoring plays

Fourth quarter

- UGA – Demetris Robertson 6-yard pass from Jake Fromm (Rodrigo Blankenship kick), 1:48. Tied 17–17. Drive: 13 plays, 96 yards, 4:38.

First overtime

- No scoring plays

Second overtime

- USC – Parker White 24-yard field goal, 0:00. South Carolina 20–17. Drive: 8 plays, 19 yards, 0:00.

Top passers

- USC – Ryan Hilinski – 15/20, 116 yards, TD
- UGA – Jake Fromm – 28/51, 295 yards, TD, 3 INT

Top rushers

- USC – Rico Dowdle – 21 rushes, 79 yards
- UGA – D'Andre Swift – 23 rushes, 113 yards, TD

Top receivers

- USC – Bryan Edwards – 6 receptions, 78 yards, TD
- UGA – George Pickens – 7 receptions, 98 yards

=== Kentucky ===
	1	2	3	4	Total
Kentucky	0	0	0	0	0
#10 Georgia	0	0	14	7	21

=== Vs. Florida ===
#8 Georgia Bulldogs vs. #6 Florida Gators – Game summary

Quarter	1	2	3	4	Total
#8 Georgia	3	10	3	8	24
#6 Florida	0	3	0	14	17

at TIAA Bank Field • Jacksonville, Florida

- Date: November 2, 2019
- Game time: 3:30 p.m.
- Game weather: Temperature: 64 °F (18 °C), Cloudy, NW 11 MPH
- Game attendance: 84,789
- Referee: David Smith
- TV announcers (CBS): Brad Nessler, Gary Danielson, and Jamie Erdahl

Game information

First Quarter

- Georgia – Rodrigo Blankenship 31-yard field goal, 3:58

Second Quarter

- Georgia – Dominick Blaylock 3-yard pass from Jake Fromm (Rodrigo Blankenship kick), 4:43
- Florida – Evan McPherson 38-yard field goal, 2:40
- Georgia – Rodrigo Blankenship 37-yard field goal, 0:14

Third Quarter

- Georgia – Rodrigo Blankenship 27-yard field goal, 9:45

Fourth Quarter

- Florida – Van Jefferson 23-yard pass from Kyle Trask (Evan McPherson kick), 13:51
- Georgia – Lawrence Cager 52-yard pass from Jake Fromm (Lawrence Cager pass), 10:01
- Florida – Freddie Swain 2-yard pass from Kyle Trask (Evan McPherson kick), 3:11

Top passers

- UGA –
- FLA –

Top rushers

- UGA –
- FLA –

Top receivers

- UGA –
- FLA –

=== Missouri ===
	1	2	3	4	Total
Missouri	0	0	0	0	0
#6 Georgia	7	9	3	8	27

=== At Auburn ===
#4 Georgia Bulldogs at #12 Auburn Tigers – Game summary

Quarter	1	2	3	4	Total
#4 Georgia	7	7	7	0	21
#12 Auburn	0	0	0	14	14

at Jordan–Hare Stadium • Auburn, Alabama

- Date: November 16, 2019
- Game time: 3:45 p.m. EST
- Game weather: Temperature: 64° • Wind: N 10 mph • Weather: Sunny
- Game attendance: 87,451
- Referee: John McDaid
- TV announcers (CBS): Brad Nessler (play-by-play), Gary Danielson (analyst), Jamie Erdahl (sideline reporter)

Game information

First Quarter

- UGA – Dominick Blaylock 51 yd pass from Jake Fromm (Rodrigo Blankenship kick), 5:56 (UGA 7–0)

Second Quarter

- UGA – Brian Herrien 5 yd pass from Jake Fromm (Rodrigo Blankenship kick), 0:20 (UGA 14–0)

Third Quarter

- UGA – Eli Wolf 5 yd pass from Jake Fromm (Rodrigo Blankenship kick), 0:13 (UGA 21–0)

Fourth Quarter

- AUB – Eli Stove 3 yd pass from Bo Nix (Anders Carlson kick), 10:04 (UGA 21–7)
- AUB – Bo Nix 2 yd run (Anders Carlson kick), 7:03 (UGA 21–14)

Top Passers

- UGA – Jake Fromm – 13–28, 110 yds, 3 TD
- AUB – Bo Nix – 30–50, 245 yds, 1 TD

Top Rushers

- UGA – D'Andre Swift – 17 rushes, 106 yds
- AUB – Bo Nix – 13 rushes, 42 yds, 1 TD

Top Receivers

- UGA – Demetris Robertson – 3 receptions, 20 yds
- AUB – Seth Williams – 13 receptions, 121 yds

=== Texas A&M ===
	1	2	3	4	Total
Texas A&M	0	3	3	7	13
#4 Georgia	3	10	3	3	19

=== At Georgia Tech ===
	1	2	3	4	Total
#4 Georgia	17	0	21	14	52
Georgia Tech	0	7	0	0	7

=== Vs. LSU (SEC Championship) ===
SEC Championship Game

Team	1	2	3	4	Total
#4 Georgia	0	3	0	7	10
• #2 LSU	14	3	17	3	37

- Date: December 7
- Location: Atlanta, GA
- Game start: 3:00 p.m.
- Game weather: Indoors
- TV announcers (CBS): Brad Nessler (play-by-play), Gary Danielson (color), Jamie Erdahl (sideline)

Scoring summary
Q1
Q2
Q3
Q4

Statistics

Statistics	Georgia	LSU
First downs	20	26
Total yards	286	481
Rushes–yards	25–61	36–132
Passing yards	225	349
Passing: Comp–Att–Int	20–43–2	28–38–0
Time of possession	26:22	33:38

Team	Category	Player	Statistics
Georgia	Passing	Jake Fromm	20/42, 225 yards, 1 TD, 2 INT
Georgia	Rushing	Brian Herrien	8 carries, 24 yards
Georgia	Receiving	George Pickens	4 receptions, 54 yards, 1 TD
LSU	Passing	Joe Burrow	28/38, 349 yards, 4 TD
LSU	Rushing	Clyde Edwards-Helaire	15 carries, 57 yards
LSU	Receiving	Justin Jefferson	7 receptions, 115 yards, 1 TD

=== Vs. Baylor (Sugar Bowl) ===
#5 Georgia Bulldogs vs. Baylor Bears – Game summary

Quarter	1	2	3	4	Total
#5 Georgia	3	16	7	0	26
#7 Baylor	0	0	14	0	14

at Mercedes–Benz Superdome, New Orleans, LA

- Date: January 1, 2020
- Game time: 8:45 p.m. EDT
- Game weather: N/A (indoors)
- Game attendance: 55,211
- Referee: Jerry McGinn
- TV announcers (ESPN): Sean McDonough and Todd Blackledge
- Recap, Box Score

Game information

First quarter

- (00:49) UGA FG – Rodrigo Blankenship 24-yard field goal
  Georgia 3–0; Drive: 6 plays, 74 yards, 2:14

Second quarter

- (12:28) UGA TD – George Pickens 27-yard pass from Jake Fromm, Rodrigo Blankenship kick
  Georgia 10–0; Drive: 8 plays, 85 yards, 2:32
- (08:08) UGA FG – Rodrigo Blankenship 31-yard field goal
  Georgia 13–0; Drive: 9 plays, 45 yards, 3:36
- (01:51) UGA TD – Matt Landers 16-yard pass from Jake Fromm, two-point pass conversion attempt failed
  Georgia 19–0; Drive: 7 plays, 71 yards, 2:52

Third quarter

- (12:14) BAY TD – Denzel Mims 12-yard pass from Charlie Brewer, John Mayers kick
  Georgia 19–7; Drive: 8 plays, 75 yards, 2:46
- (07:16) UGA TD – Zamir White 13-yard rush, Rodrigo Blankenship kick
  Georgia 26–7; Drive: 7 plays, 47 yards, 2:46
- (04:10) BAY TD – Charlie Brewer 1-yard rush, John Mayers kick
  Georgia 26–14; Drive: 8 plays, 75 yards, 3:06

Top passers

- UGA – Jake Fromm – 20/30, 250 yards, 2 TD
- BAY – Charlie Brewer – 24/41, 211 yards, TD, INT

Top rushers

- UGA – Zamir White – 18 carries, 92 yards, TD
- BAY – Trestan Ebner – 5 carries, 23 yards

Top receivers

- UGA – George Pickens – 12 receptions, 175 yards, TD
- BAY – Denzel Mims – 5 receptions, 75 yards, TD

== Rankings ==
Ranking movements Legend: ██ Increase in ranking ██ Decrease in ranking т = Tied with team above or below ( ) = First-place votes
	Week																
Poll	Pre	1	2	3	4	5	6	7	8	9	10	11	12	13	14	15	Final
AP	3	3	3	3	3	3 (4)	3 T (3)	10	10	8	6	5	4	4	4	5	4
Coaches	3	3	3	3	3	3 (1)	3	10	9	7	6	5	4	4	4	5	4
CFP	Not released										6	4	4	4	4	5	Not released

== Players drafted into the NFL ==
Round	Pick	Player	Position	NFL Club
1	4	Andrew Thomas	OT	New York Giants
1	29	Isaiah Wilson	OT	Tennessee Titans
2	35	D'Andre Swift	RB	Detroit Lions
4	111	Solomon Kindley	OG	Miami Dolphins
5	167	Jake Fromm	QB	Buffalo Bills
6	190	Charlie Woerner	TE	San Francisco 49ers
7	255	Tae Crowder	LB	New York Giants
