= Tehrany =

Tehrany is a surname. Notable people with the name include:

- Armin Tehrany, American orthopedic surgeon
- Mahyat Shafapour Tehrany (born 1985), Iranian geomatic engineer
