= J. R. Reed (gridiron football, born 1996) =

American football player

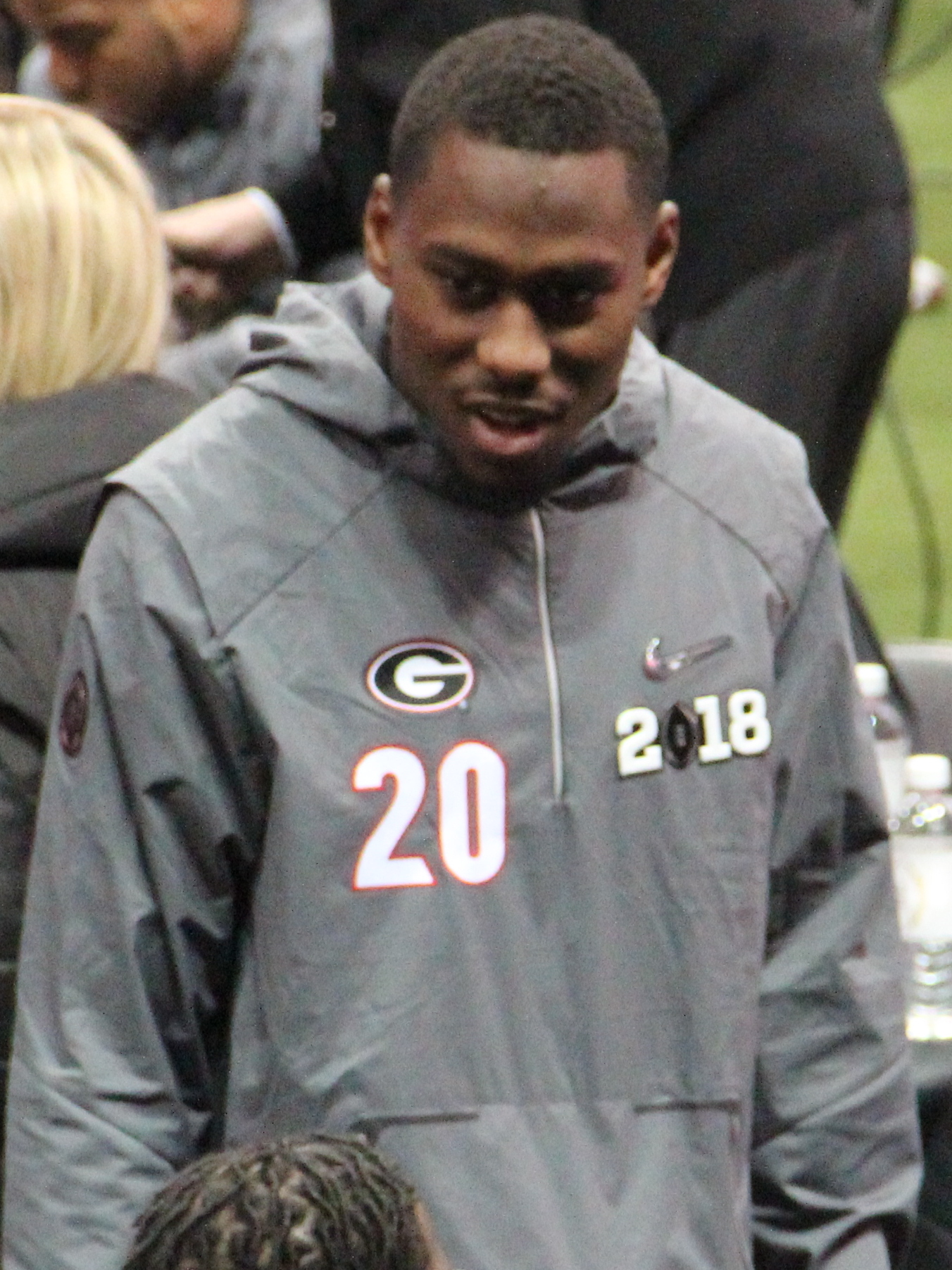
- Reed with the Georgia Bulldogs in 2018

Profile
- Position: Safety

Personal information
- Born: March 11, 1996 (age 30); Frisco, Texas, U.S.
- Listed height: 6 ft 1 in (1.85 m)
- Listed weight: 194 lb (88 kg)

Career information
- High school: Prestonwood Christian Academy (Plano, Texas)
- College: Tulsa (2015); Georgia (2016–2019)
- NFL draft: 2020: undrafted

Career history
- Jacksonville Jaguars (2020)*; Los Angeles Rams (2020–2021); New York Giants (2021); Denver Broncos (2022)*; Las Vegas Raiders (2022)*; Detroit Lions (2022)*; Montreal Alouettes (2023–2024)
- * Offseason or practice squad member only

Awards and highlights
- Grey Cup champion (2023); Consensus All-American (2019); First-team All-SEC (2019); Second-team All-SEC (2017)

Career NFL statistics
- Total tackles: 15
- Stats at Pro Football Reference

Career CFL statistics
- Total tackles: 31
- Interceptions: 1
- Stats at CFL.ca

Jake Rashaan Reed (born March 11, 1996) is an American former professional football player who was a safety in the National Football League (NFL) and Canadian Football League (CFL). He played college football for the Tulsa Hurricane and Georgia Bulldogs.

== Early life ==
Reed attended Prestonwood Christian Academy in Plano, Texas. He played safety and wide receiver. He committed to the University of Tulsa to play college football.

== College career ==
Reed played one year at Tulsa in 2015. In 2016, he transferred to the University of Georgia. After not playing his first year due to transfer rules, Reed started all 15 games in 2017. He recorded 79 tackles, two interceptions and 1.5 sacks. In 2018, he started all 14 games, totaling 66 tackles, two interceptions and one sack. Reed returned to Georgia for his senior season, rather than enter the 2019 NFL draft. He was named a finalist for the Jim Thorpe Award and Bronko Nagurski Trophy.

== Professional career ==
Pre-draft measurables
Height	Weight	Arm length	Hand span	Wingspan	40-yard dash	10-yard split	20-yard split	Vertical jump	Broad jump	Bench press
6 ft 0 3/4 in (1.85 m)	202 lb (92 kg)	32 1/2 in (0.83 m)	9 7/8 in (0.25 m)	6 ft 4 3/8 in (1.94 m)	4.54 s	1.56 s	2.63 s	34.0 in (0.86 m)	10 ft 10 in (3.30 m)	15 reps
All values from NFL Combine

=== Jacksonville Jaguars ===
Reed signed with the Jacksonville Jaguars as an undrafted free agent on April 27, 2020. He was waived on September 5, 2020.

=== Los Angeles Rams ===
On September 9, 2020, Reed was signed to the Los Angeles Rams practice squad. He was elevated to the active roster on November 23 and November 28 for the team's weeks 11 and 12 games against the Tampa Bay Buccaneers and San Francisco 49ers, and reverted to the practice squad after each game. On December 5, 2020, Reed was promoted to the active roster.

On October 2, 2021, Reed was waived by the Rams and re-signed to the practice squad.

=== New York Giants ===
On October 26, 2021, Reed was signed by the New York Giants off the Rams practice squad.

=== Denver Broncos ===
On March 21, 2022, Reed signed with the Denver Broncos. He was waived on August 30, 2022.

=== Las Vegas Raiders ===
On September 1, 2022, Reed was signed to the Las Vegas Raiders practice squad. He was released on September 27.

=== Detroit Lions ===
On October 25, 2022, Reed was signed to the Detroit Lions practice squad. He was released off the practice squad three days later.

=== Montreal Alouettes ===
On May 23, 2023, Reed signed with the Montreal Alouettes of the Canadian Football League (CFL). He was placed on the reserve/suspended list on May 12, 2024, and released on June 17, 2024.

== Career statistics ==
=== NFL ===
Year	Team	Games		Tackles					Interceptions						Fumbles		
Year	Team	GP	GS	Total	Solo	Ast	Sck	Sfty	PD	Int	Yds	Avg	Lng	TD	FF	FR	TD
2020	LAR	7	0	2	0	2	0.0	0	0	0	0	0.0	0	0	0	0	0
2021	LAR	1	0	0	0	0	0.0	0	0	0	0	0.0	0	0	0	0	0
2021	NYG	8	0	13	5	8	0.0	0	0	0	0	0.0	0	0	0	0	0
Career		16	0	15	5	10	0.0	0	0	0	0	0.0	0	0	0	0	0

=== College ===
Year	Team	Games		Tackles				Interceptions				Fumbles		
Year	Team	GP	GS	Total	Solo	Ast	Sack	PD	Int	Yds	TD	FF	FR	TD
2015	Tulsa	13	0	5	2	3	0.0	1	0	0	0	0	0	0
2016	Georgia	0	0	DNP										
2017	Georgia	15	15	79	40	39	1.5	7	2	48	0	1	2	1
2018	Georgia	14	14	66	38	28	1.0	4	2	0	0	0	0	0
2019	Georgia	13	13	54	29	25	0.5	8	1	0	0	1	1	1
Career		55	42	204	109	95	3.0	20	5	48	0	2	3	2

== Personal life ==
His father, Jake Reed, is a former NFL wide receiver who played with the Minnesota Vikings and the New Orleans Saints. Reed is the nephew of former NFL cornerback Dale Carter, and is the first cousin of Nigel Warrior, Dale Carter's son and former NFL cornerback/safety. Both Reed and Warrior participated and were left undrafted in the 2020 NFL draft.
