= The Unfinished Revolution: Education and Politics in the Thought of Thomas Jefferson =

Biography of Thomas Jefferson

- Author: Harold Hellenbrand
- Genre: Biography
- Publisher: University of Delaware Press
- Publication date: February 1, 1990

The Unfinished Revolution: Education and Politics in the Thought of Thomas Jefferson is a biography of American Founding Father and third President of the United States, Thomas Jefferson, written by scholar and professor, Harold Hellenbrand. As indicated by the subtitle, the book focuses on Jefferson's philosophy on the importance of education in America, as a means of improving the state of the republic, post-Revolutionary War. The Unfinished Revolution was released February 1, 1990, through the University of Delaware Press.

== Synopsis ==
The book must not be mistaken as a fully wholistic biography of Thomas Jefferson's life, due to its narrowed focus. Much like Jefferson was more concerned with education than politics in his lifetime, Hellenbrand spends more time analyzing Jefferson's educational ideologies. Nevertheless, The Unfinished Revolution connects education with politics by examining how the president steadfastly believed that schools play a necessary role in revolution and rebellion. Jefferson did not limit his philosophy on the school system to America alone, but saw it as a vital factor to any revolution, no matter what country or state. Yet the largest impact he was able to make was in the state of Virginia, refining their laws and policies to be more educationally centered, and ultimately establishing the University of Virginia.

Based on the research and ideas of Jay Fliegelman, Lawrence Stone, and Melvin Yazawa, Hellenbrand makes his analysis through a lens of the anti-patriarchal revolt in the late eighteenth-century. For President Jefferson, the revolt against patriarchal oppression was not complete after the end of the war with the British; hence, it is considered an “unfinished revolution” in the former president's eyes, because the process is insufficient without improvement for schools and teaching.

The Unfinished Revolution identifies how Jefferson wore many hats, so to speak, in which the biography interprets those of president, revolutionary, university founder, and so forth. He worked and socialized with men of variant ages, so as to be well-rounded in the way he viewed the world and its current dilemmas. The book highlights the emphasis Jefferson placed on the mentor and tutee relationship, just as he experienced in Williamsburg, Virginia. Jefferson's mentors and tutors were his father, James Maury, George Wythe, William Small, and Gov. Francis Fauquier. Hellenbrand claims that these men helped shape Jefferson's thinking. To name a couple of his most noteworthy tutees, Jefferson in turn mentored Peter Carr and James Monroe. Hellenbrand discusses the concept of Jeffersonian paternalism - this terminology meaning how the president viewed himself as a father-figure in education. His own epitaph considers him as the “Father of the University of Virginia." The philosophy he withheld on mentorship crossed over into the founding of this college, which he hoped would be the fulfillment of the revolution he perceived as incomplete.

An interpretation is also made that familial relationships, or lack thereof, greatly impacted the way that the president saw and experienced education. Hellenbrand makes use of psychoanalysis when analyzing Jefferson's educational past, and theorizing why Jefferson found his own experiences and ideas to be essential enough that they should be passed down to the following generations of American people. Moreover, Hellenbrand sees his personal life as a large factor that enabled his ideology. The book also exposes the paradox in Jefferson's way of thinking; there is an incongruence between Jefferson's thoughts versus his actions. There was a series of bills that were passed in Virginia, which resulted positively for schools, yet detrimentally impacted the treatment of slaves and criminals. This legislation was made possible through the university and other institutional platforms, again demonstrating how education and politics come together in the hopes of promoting the public good.

Some of the material he had written was originally published in “Roads to Happiness: Rhetorical and Philosophical Design in Jefferson’s Notes on the State of Virginia” and in “‘Not to Destroy But to Fulfill:’ Jefferson, Indians, and Republican Dispensation,” which he was granted permission to reprint. Hellenbrand acknowledges Jay Fliegelman, Paul V. Turner, Richard S. Popkin, Margo Horne, and Timothy Roche, who helped guide his research and the focus of his book.

== Reception ==
The Unfinished Revolution has received mixed criticisms. Joseph J. Ellis praises the biography in a review as “the best single-volume study of Jefferson’s educational thought available." Hellenbrand naturally takes an educational approach because he himself is greatly invested in the American university system, teaching and administrating specifically in California. Ellis continues that “one comes away from the book with a keener appreciation of Jefferson’s layered disposition and a heightened sense of why the history of education and of politics cannot be studied separately."

Others perpetuate this positive feedback by commending Hellenbrand for contributing new insight into a seemingly dated topic. Robert M. Senkewicz writes that the book “offers some fresh perspectives [...] Not simply another work on Jefferson’s educational philosophy, this book is a study of what the author terms ‘the public dimension of Jefferson’s education ideas.'" Still, others like Constance B. Schulz point out the redundancy of the first few chapters of The Unfinished Revolution, which restate what has been previously covered by earlier scholars.

From a more negative standpoint, Hellenbrand is criticized for a lack of the correct context in his work. His theories regarding Jefferson's educational inspiration and ambition are based on cultural and historical issues that arose after Jefferson's philosophies would have already been established. In other words, the events that Hellenbrand argues influenced Jefferson's way of thinking occurred after his philosophies on education were already manifested, for the most part. For instance, he claims that it is the difference between an “affectionate parent” and the “stern patriarch” that affected Jefferson's self-identified paternalistic role. Critics conclude that this, amongst others, may be an overanalyzed, perhaps even biased, assumption on Hellenbrand's part. He is even described as being “too good a scholar to have to resort to jargon." Thus, while some believe The Unfinished Revolution to be an accurate representation of Hellenbrand's understanding and interpretive skills, others remain conflicted.
