= Lawrence Cager =

American football player (born 1997)

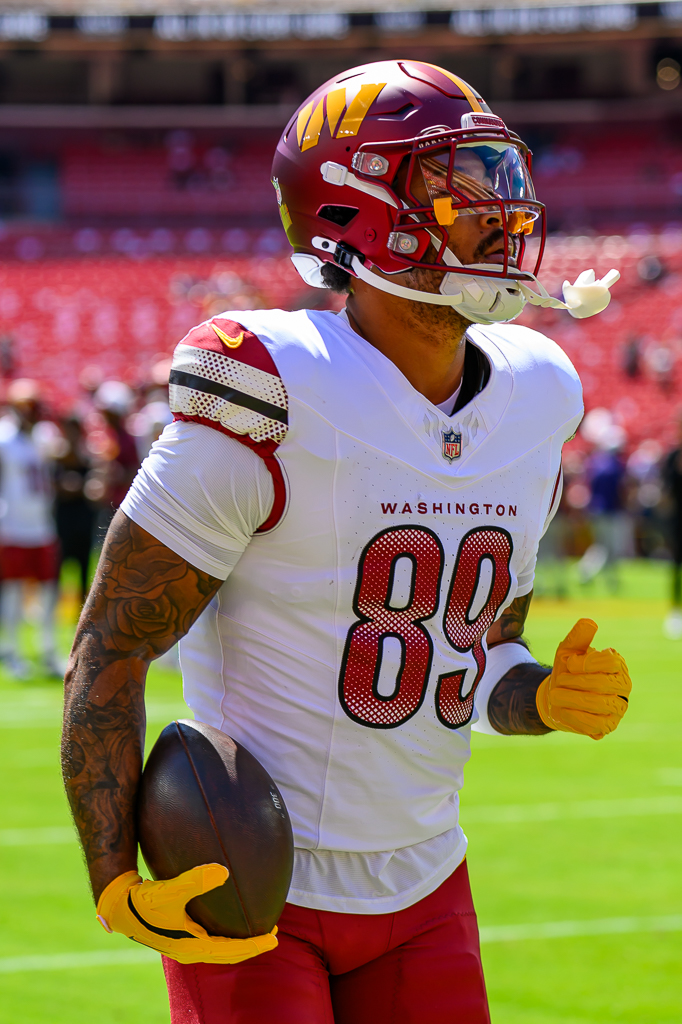
- Cager with the Washington Commanders in 2025

Profile
- Position: Tight end

Personal information
- Born: August 20, 1997 (age 29); Baltimore, Maryland, U.S.
- Listed height: 6 ft 5 in (1.96 m)
- Listed weight: 220 lb (100 kg)

Career information
- High school: Calvert Hall (Towson, Maryland)
- College: Miami (FL) (2015–2018); Georgia (2019)
- NFL draft: 2020: undrafted

Career history
- New York Jets (2020); Cleveland Browns (2021); New York Jets (2022); New York Giants (2022–2024); Washington Commanders (2025–2026)*
- * Offseason or practice squad member only

Career NFL statistics as of 2025
- Receptions: 19
- Receiving yards: 189
- Receiving touchdowns: 2
- Stats at Pro Football Reference

Lawrence Cager (born August 20, 1997) is an American professional football tight end. He played college football for the Miami Hurricanes and Georgia Bulldogs.

== Early life ==
Cager attended Calvert Hall College High School in Towson, Maryland, where he played high school football. He was ranked as a four-star prospect by Rivals.com.

== College career ==
Cager had 45 receptions for 681 yards and 10 receiving touchdowns in his three seasons at Miami (FL) until transferring to Georgia for his senior season. Cager had 33 receptions for 476 yards and four receiving touchdowns in his lone season at Georgia.

=== College statistics ===
Year	School	G	Receiving			
Year	School	G	Rec	Yds	Avg	TD
2015	Miami (FL)	5	8	70	8.8	1
2017	Miami (FL)	8	16	237	14.8	3
2018	Miami (FL)	12	21	374	17.8	6
2019	Georgia	8	33	476	14.4	4
Career		33	78	1,157	14.8	14

== Professional career ==
Pre-draft measurables
Height	Weight	Arm length	Hand span	Wingspan
6 ft 4 3/4 in (1.95 m)	220 lb (100 kg)	33 3/8 in (0.85 m)	8 7/8 in (0.23 m)	6 ft 7 3/8 in (2.02 m)
All values from NFL Combine

=== New York Jets (first stint) ===
In May 2020, Cager signed with the New York Jets as an undrafted free agent after the 2020 NFL draft. He was waived on September 5, 2020, and signed to the practice squad the next day. He was elevated to the active roster on September 26 for the team's week 3 game against the Indianapolis Colts, and reverted to the practice squad after the game on September 28. He made his NFL debut in the game, recording two receptions for 35 yards. He was elevated again on October 1 for the week 4 game against the Denver Broncos, and reverted to the practice squad again the next day. He suffered a hamstring injury in the game, and was placed on the practice squad/injured list on October 7. He was activated back to the practice squad on October 28. He was signed to the active roster on December 12, 2020.

On August 31, 2021, Cager was waived by the Jets.

=== Cleveland Browns ===
On October 4, 2021, Cager signed with the Cleveland Browns' practice squad. The Browns elevated Cager to their active roster on November 20. He was promoted to the active roster on December 16. He was waived on December 24. Cager was re-signed to the Browns' practice squad on December 28.

=== New York Jets (second stint) ===
On January 12, 2022, Cager signed a reserve/future contract with the Jets and changed his position to tight end. He was waived by the Jets on October 15.

=== New York Giants ===
On October 18, 2022, the New York Giants signed Cager to their practice squad. Cager was elevated from the practice squad for Week 8 and Week 10 games against the Seattle Seahawks and Houston Texans. In Week 10 against the Texans Cager recorded his first career touchdown in the 24-16 win. On November 19, he was elevated from the practice squad for the third time this season for Week 11 game against the Detroit Lions. On November 22, Cager was promoted to the active roster.

On October 18, 2023, Cager was waived by the Giants and re-signed to the practice squad. He was promoted to the active roster on November 4. On December 30, the Giants placed him on injured reserve.

On March 13, 2024, the Giants re-signed Cager on a one-year contract. He was waived on August 27, and re-signed to the practice squad. He was released by New York on October 1.

=== Washington Commanders ===
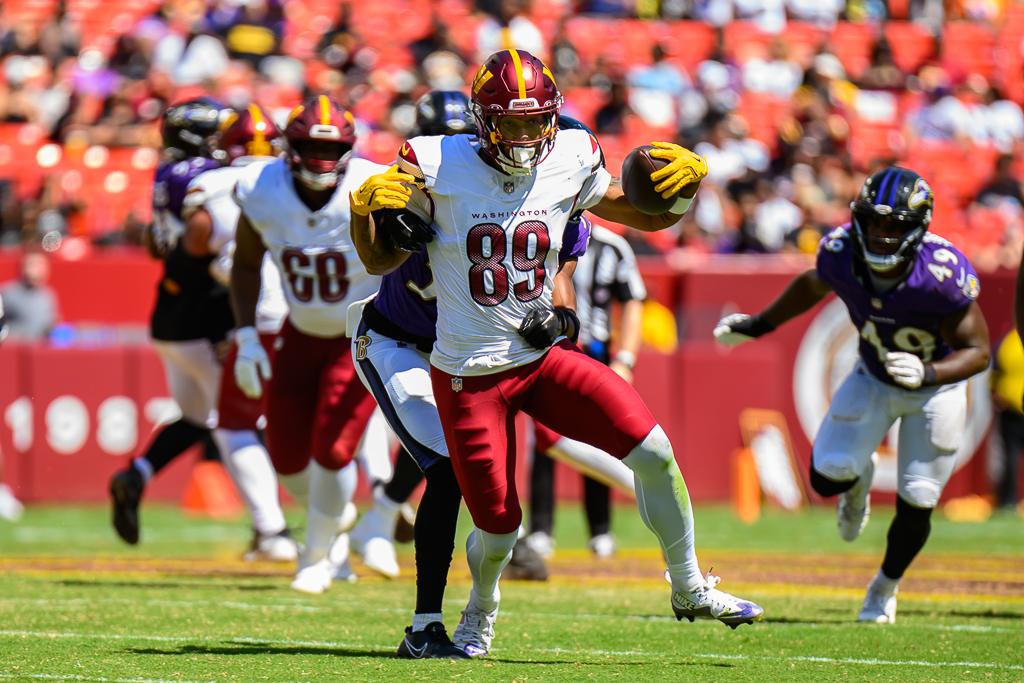
Cager with the Washington Commanders in 2025

Cager signed a futures contract with the Washington Commanders on January 8, 2025. He was released on August 26, and re-signed with their practice squad the following day. Cager was released from the practice squad on September 10, and was re-signed to the practice squad three days later.

Cager signed a reserve/futures contract with the Commanders on January 7, 2026. On August 30, he was waived by Washington as a part of final roster cuts before the start of the regular season.
