= Poly Prep =

Private school in Brooklyn, New York, US

Polytechnic Preparatory Country Day School
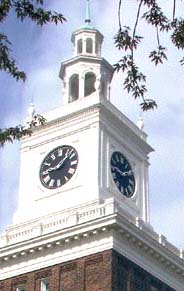
- The clock tower atop the main building

Location
- 9216 Seventh Avenue; Dyker Heights, Brooklyn, New York 11228; United States; 40°36′43″N 74°01′30″W

Information
- Type: Independent; Country Day School
- Motto: Virtus victrix fortunae (Virtue is the victor over fate)
- Established: 1854 (as the Brooklyn Collegiate and Polytechnic Institute)
- Headmaster: Noni Thomas López
- Faculty: Approx. 270
- Grades: N–12
- Gender: Co-educational
- Enrollment: 1,021
- Campus: Urban
- Campus size: 26 acres (110,000 m^{2})
- Colors: Blue and grey
- Athletics conference: Ivy Preparatory School League
- Mascot: Blue Devil
- Accreditation: NYSAIS
- Newspaper: The Polygon (Upper School); The Tower Times (Middle School)
- Yearbook: The Polyglot
- Affiliation: New York Interschool
- Website: www.polyprep.org

Poly Prep Country Day School (commonly known as Poly Prep) is an independent, co-educational day school with two campuses in Brooklyn, New York, United States. The Middle School (5th to 8th grades) and Upper School (9th to 12th grades) are located in the Dyker Heights section of Brooklyn, while the Lower School (nursery to 4th grade) is located in Brooklyn's Park Slope neighborhood. Initially founded as part of the Brooklyn Collegiate and Polytechnic Institute (predecessor of the NYU Tandon School of Engineering), Poly Prep now offers classes from nursery school through 12th grade.

== History ==
Poly Prep was established 172 years ago in 1854 as the Brooklyn Collegiate and Polytechnic Institute in Downtown Brooklyn. It was one of the first private boys' schools in the city of Brooklyn. The initial aim of the school was to offer an academic program similar to that of boarding schools of the time while striving to maintain a strong community feel among students and faculty alike.

After 45 years, the future of the Brooklyn Collegiate and Polytechnic Institute was re-evaluated in 1889, when the preparatory school and the collegiate division were finally separated. In 1891, the construction of a new building next door to the school's original building provided a home for the college, which became known as the Polytechnic Institute of Brooklyn. Both divisions still exist, although the collegiate division, after many changes of name, was eventually acquired by New York University (NYU) in 2008 and, as of 2014, is now known as the New York University Tandon School of Engineering.

After its initial separation from the collegiate division, the Polytechnic Preparatory Institute remained an all-boys collegiate preparatory program at 99 Livingston Street and, by the mid-1890s, had already become one of the largest prep schools in the country, with over 600 students.

=== Going co-educational ===
During the tenure of headmaster William M. Williams, the school began the transition to co-education in 1977 when it first admitted girls, graduating its first co-ed class in 1979.

=== Major primary school expansion ===
In the 2006–2007 school year, an expansion was added to the Park Slope building. In April 2009, Poly Prep's Lower School won the Lucy B. Moses Award from the New York Landmarks Conservancy as an outstanding example of historic preservation and renovation.

=== Child abuse ===
The school was the subject of a federal lawsuit filed in the United States District Court for the Eastern District of New York in Brooklyn in 2009 centering on the sexual assault of students by Philip Foglietta, the head football coach from 1966 to 1991.

The allegations surfaced during Foglietta's first year at the school, during the tenure of Headmaster J. Folwell Scull, who was the head of Poly Prep from 1949 to 1970. They persisted during the tenure of William M. Williams, who was the headmaster from 1970 to 2000. Despite ongoing accusations of rape and molestation, no action was taken for 25 years, until Foglietta's contract was not renewed in 1991. However, even then, the school announced that Foglietta had decided to retire and made no mention of the abuse.

Alumni continued to press the matter, and eventually Williams's successor, David Harman, wrote to alumni in 2002 that the school had "recently [emphasis added] received credible allegations" of abuse—36 years after the first report of molestation.

Two years later 12 victims filed suit in state court, but the suit was dismissed due to New York State's statute of limitations. However, U.S. District Court Judge Frederic Block subsequently ruled that portions of the suit could proceed in federal court. The suit was settled for $10 million in December 2012. On February 21, 2014, the school issued what the Wall Street Journal called "a sweeping apology" for the abuse and the school's failure over the decades to respond appropriately when victims revealed their abuse. Headmaster Harman and the chairman of the board of trustees, Scott Smith, subsequently resigned. A permanent memorial to the victims of the abuse was placed in a prominent location of the campus.

== Institution ==
=== Divisions ===
Poly Prep consists of three divisions, beginning with the Lower School located at 50 Prospect Park West in Brooklyn. Lower School education commences with the nursery school program, which consists of early childhood learning up until the pre-kindergarten level, and continues on through fourth grade. The middle school program begins at grade 5, at which point Poly students enroll at Poly Prep's Middle and Upper School campus located at 9216 Seventh Avenue in Brooklyn, where they continue their education through 8th grade and then into high school.

== Headmasters of the Country Day School ==
In the 109 years since the opening of the Dyker Heights campus in 1917, Poly has had six headmasters (currently known as Head of School): Joseph Dana Allen (1917–1949), J. Folwell Scull (1949–1970), William M. Williams (1970–2000), David Harman (2000–2016), Audrius Barzdukas (2016–2023), John Rankin - interim (2023-2025), and Noni Thomas López (2025–present).

== Notable alumni ==
- Louis Aronne, obesity medicine specialist at Weill Cornell Medicine
- Jared Banner, baseball executive
- Jake Bongiovi (born 2002), son of rock star, Bon Jovi
- Robert Briskman (born 1932), co-founder of SIRIUS Satellite Radio
- Michael Brown (1949–2015), founder/member of bands The Left Banke and Stories, composer of "Walk Away Renée" and "Pretty Ballerina." Known as Michael Lookofsky during Poly years. (Did not graduate with class of 1967)
- Rob Brown (born 1984), actor
- William G. Carroll (1893–1969), member of the New York State Assembly
- Bruce Cutler (1948– 2025), criminal defense attorney
- Kenneth Duberstein (1944–2022), White House Chief of Staff to President Ronald Reagan; political consultant
- Brian Flores (born 1981), Defensive Coordinator of the NFL's Minnesota Vikings
- Dan Fogler (born 1976), actor; Tony Award for 25th Annual Putnam County Spelling Bee
- Michael Furst (1856–1934), lawyer
- Joel Gertner (born 1975), professional wrestling personality
- Jahkeen Gilmore (born 1983), former NFL wide receiver for the Carolina Panthers
- Henry Godbout (born 2003), minor league player
- Louisa Gummer (born 1991), model
- Briton Hadden (1898-1929), co-founder of Time magazine
- Harold Hellenbrand, university professor, administrator, and author
- P. J. Hill (born 1987), former NFL running back
- R. M. Koster (born 1934), novelist
- Rich Kotite (born 1942), former NFL player and coach
- Arthur Levitt (born 1931), Chairman of the United States Securities and Exchange Commission, 1993-2001; Chairman of the American Stock Exchange, 1978-1989
- Howard Levy (born 1951), musician and Grammy Award winner (with Bela Fleck and The Flecktones)
- Seth Low (1851–1916), Mayor of Brooklyn and New York City; President of Columbia University
- Charles E. Marsters (1883-1962), lacrosse player
- William C. McCreery (1896–1988), American lawyer and member of the New York State Assembly
- Joseph McElroy (born 1930) novelist
- Joakim Noah (born 1985), professional basketball player who played in the NBA for the Chicago Bulls and New York Knicks
- Eric Olsen (born 1988), professional football player who played in the NFL for the New Orleans Saints
- Park Cannon (born 1991), member of the Georgia House of Representatives from the 58th District
- Richard Perry (1942–2024), record producer
- Stewart Rahr (born 1946), founder and owner of Kinray, the largest privately held pharmaceutical distributor in the world
- Max Rose (born 1986), US Congressman from New York's 11th congressional district, and US Army Bronze Star recipient.
- Jabari Brisport — activist and former public school teacher
- Alfred P. Sloan (1875–1966), General Motors Corporation President, 1923-1937; CEO, 1923-1946; Chairman, 1937-1956
- Bonnie Somerville (born 1974) actress
- Stephen E. Smith (1927–1990), brother-in-law and campaign manager for President John F. Kennedy.
- Joe Tacopina (born 1966), criminal defense lawyer and owner//president/chairman of Italian soccer club Venezia F.C.
- Armin Tehrany, New York City based orthopaedic surgeon and film producer
- Bob Telson (born 1949), composer (The Gospel at Colonus)
- Overton Tremper (1906–1996), professional baseball player for the Brooklyn Dodgers
- Henry van Dyke Jr. (1852–1933), author, educator and clergyman
- Isaiah Wilson (born 1999), NFL offensive lineman
- Angela Yee (born 1976), radio host on SiriusXM's Shade 45

== Notable faculty ==
- William Cary Duncan (1874–1945), American playwright who taught English and public speaking at Poly Prep (then known as Brooklyn Polytechnic Preparatory School) from 1897 through 1917.
