= Charles E. Marsters =

American lacrosse player and proponent

Profile
- Position: Point

Career information
- High school: Poly Prep Country Day School
- College: Harvard

Career history

USILA executive
- 1907–1908: Vice President of the USILA
- 1909–1910: President of the USILA
- 1917–1918: President of the USILA

Awards and highlights
- 1951 USILA Award; National Lacrosse Hall of Fame inductee (1957)

Other information
- Military career
- Branch: United States Navy

Charles E. Marsters (9 June 1883 - December 1962) was an American lacrosse player and proponent. He helped promote the sport throughout New England and served in the United States Intercollegiate Lacrosse Association (USILA) in various executive capacities. In 1957, he was inducted into the National Lacrosse Hall of Fame.

== Biography ==
Marsters attended Poly Prep Country Day School in Brooklyn, New York, where he played basketball and competed in track & field. He graduated in 1902. He then attended Harvard University, and played freshman lacrosse in his first year. Marsters played lacrosse on the varsity team for the remaining three years, and spent one season as the team captain. He was accepted into the Ivy Club as a sophomore and elected as its president during his senior year. He graduated from Harvard in 1907 with a Bachelor of Science degree.

In 1913, with Paul Gustafson, he helped found the Boston Lacrosse Club, and for sixteen years played on the team at the point position and acted as its manager. After that, he coached the team for some years and served as the club president. Marsters helped promote the formation of a lacrosse team at Yale University in 1915, and arrange for former Crescent Athletic Club player Dr. William Madden to coach the fledgling team for two weeks.

He enlisted in the United States Navy during the First World War. He was commissioned as an ensign through an officer training school and was stationed at Naval Air Station Pensacola.

Between 1926 and 1930, he promoted the formation of teams at Brown, MIT, New Hampshire, and Tufts. Alongside Tom Dent in 1935, he was a co-founder of the New England Intercollegiate Lacrosse League (NEILL). Marsters served as the United States Intercollegiate Lacrosse Association (USILA) vice president from 1907 to 1908, and president from 1909 to 1910 and 1917 to 1918. He also served on the All-American committee, and he was on the USILA executive board from 1949 to 1952.

He received the 1951 USILA Award for the individual who had done the most to promote the sport over the past year. Marsters was inducted into the US Lacrosse Hall of Fame as a player in 1957.
