= Jared Banner =

American baseball executive

Baltimore Orioles
- General manager
- Born: Brooklyn, New York, U.S.

Teams
- Baltimore Orioles (2026–present)

Jared Banner is an American baseball executive. He is the general manager of the Baltimore Orioles of Major League Baseball.

Banner is from Brooklyn. He attended Poly Prep and Amherst College, where he played college baseball for the Amherst Mammoths as a third baseman and outfielder. He graduated in 2007. After graduating from Amherst, Banner's baseball coach connected him with Ben Cherington, an Amherst alumni who worked for the Boston Red Sox, and Banner was hired to work in player development. In December 2018, the New York Mets hired him as their executive director of player development.

After two years with the Mets, Banner joined the Chicago Cubs. During the 2021 season, Banner convinced Jed Hoyer, the Cubs' president of baseball operations, to acquire Pete Crow-Armstrong in a trade with the Mets. In November 2023, the Cubs promoted Banner to assistant general manager.

In October 2026, the Orioles hired Banner as their general manager.
