= Dennis Kelly (American football) =

American football player (born 1990)

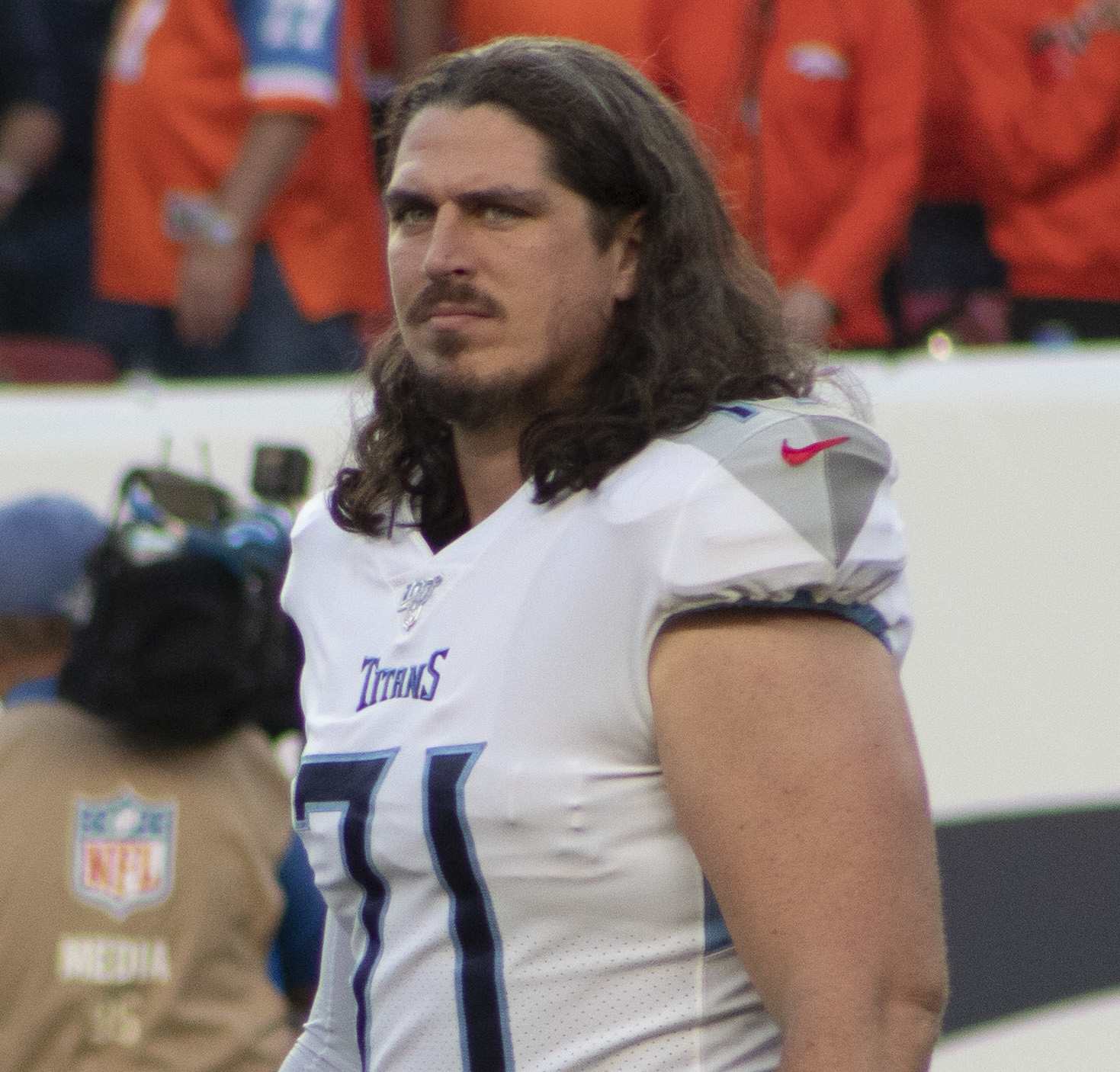
- Kelly with the Tennessee Titans in 2018

No. 71
- Position: Offensive tackle

Personal information
- Born: January 16, 1990 (age 36); Chicago Heights, Illinois, U.S.
- Listed height: 6 ft 8 in (2.03 m)
- Listed weight: 321 lb (146 kg)

Career information
- High school: Marian Catholic (Chicago Heights)
- College: Purdue (2008–2011)
- NFL draft: 2012: 5th round, 153rd overall pick

Career history
- Philadelphia Eagles (2012–2015); Tennessee Titans (2016–2020); Green Bay Packers (2021); Indianapolis Colts (2022); Philadelphia Eagles (2023)*; New York Jets (2023)
- * Offseason or practice squad member only

Career NFL statistics as of 2023
- Games played: 131
- Games started: 54
- Receptions: 1
- Receiving yards: 1
- Receiving touchdowns: 1
- Stats at Pro Football Reference

Dennis Andrew Kelly (born January 16, 1990) is an American former professional football player who was an offensive tackle in the National Football League (NFL). He played college football for the Purdue Boilermakers and was selected by the Philadelphia Eagles in the fifth round of the 2012 NFL draft.

Kelly played with the Eagles for four seasons primarily as a reserve lineman before playing for the Tennessee Titans from 2016 to 2020, where he saw an expanded role. Kelly then spent the next two seasons in reserve roles with the Green Bay Packers and Indianapolis Colts, respectively. In 2023, Kelly had an offseason stint with the Eagles before playing in one regular season game with the New York Jets.

== Early life ==
Kelly was born in Chicago Heights, Illinois, to an Irish family. He is the brother of NFL coach Tim Kelly. Kelly attended Marian Catholic High School in Chicago Heights, where he played tight end and some basketball.

== College career ==
Kelly studied organizational leadership and supervision at Purdue University from 2008 to 2011 and appeared in 42 games, including 37 starts. During the 2014 offseason, he returned to Purdue to finish his degree.

== Professional career ==
Pre-draft measurables
Height	Weight	40-yard dash	10-yard split	20-yard split	20-yard shuttle	Three-cone drill	Vertical jump	Broad jump	Bench press
6 ft 8 1/8 in (2.04 m)	321 lb (146 kg)	5.33 s	1.82 s	3.09 s	4.91 s	7.73 s	27.0 in (0.69 m)	8 ft 8 in (2.64 m)	30 reps
All values from Pro Day

=== Philadelphia Eagles (first stint) ===
Kelly was selected by the Philadelphia Eagles in the fifth round (153rd overall) of the 2012 NFL draft. He played in 13 games as a rookie. Kelly started the last 10 games, three at right guard and seven at right tackle. The Eagles finished with a 4–12 record.

Kelly did not play in any games in 2013 as the Eagles finished with a 10–6 record and qualified for the playoffs, losing to the New Orleans Saints in the Wild Card Round.

Kelly played in three games in 2014 from Weeks 2–4, starting all three. The Eagles finished with a 10–6 record for the second consecutive year, but did not qualify for the playoffs.

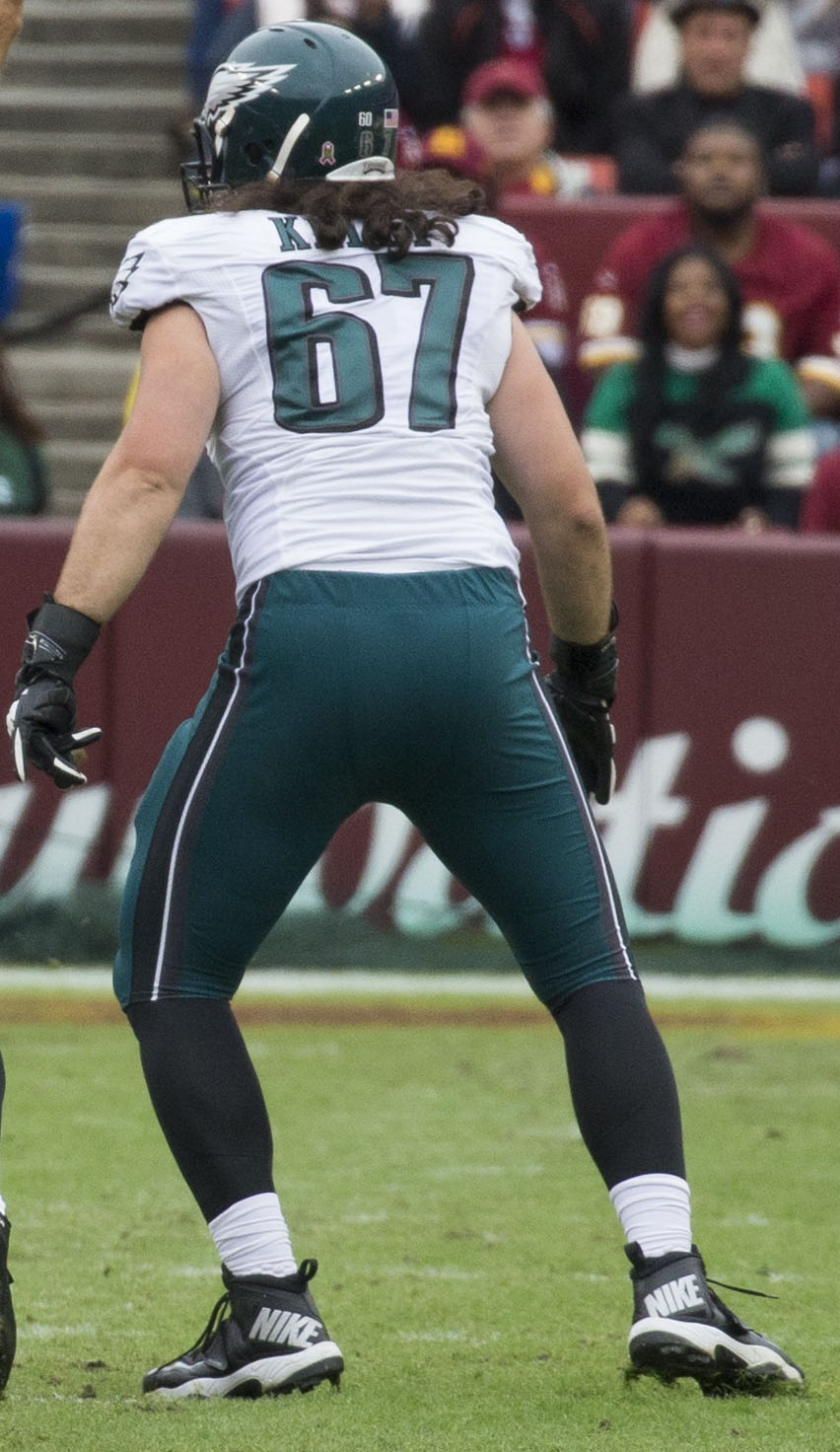
Kelly in 2015

On September 9, 2015, Kelly signed a one-year contract extension with the Eagles through 2016. He played in 14 games, starting two, in 2015. The Eagles finished with a 7–9 record and did not qualify for the playoffs.

On April 27, 2016, Kelly signed another one-year contract extension with the Eagles through 2017.

=== Tennessee Titans ===
==== 2016 season ====
On August 16, 2016, Kelly was traded to the Tennessee Titans for wide receiver Dorial Green-Beckham.

In his first season with the Titans, Kelly played in all 16 games, starting six, often being used as a sixth lineman for an offensive line that blocked for DeMarco Murray as he led the AFC in rushing yards. Kelly notably replaced Taylor Lewan when he was ejected during the Week 10 47–25 victory over the Green Bay Packers as the offense amassed 446 yards and six touchdowns during that game. The Titans finished 9–7 from a 3–13 record last season.

==== 2017 season ====
On July 26, 2017, Kelly signed a multi-year contract extension with the Titans.

Kelly remained in a backup role behind starting left tackle Taylor Lewan and starting right tackle Jack Conklin, playing in all 16 games starting one. The Titans again finished 9–7 and qualified for the playoffs, where they won the Wild Card game against the Kansas City Chiefs and lost the Divisional Round to the New England Patriots. He played in both games and replaced Conklin when he tore his ACL in the latter.

==== 2018 season ====
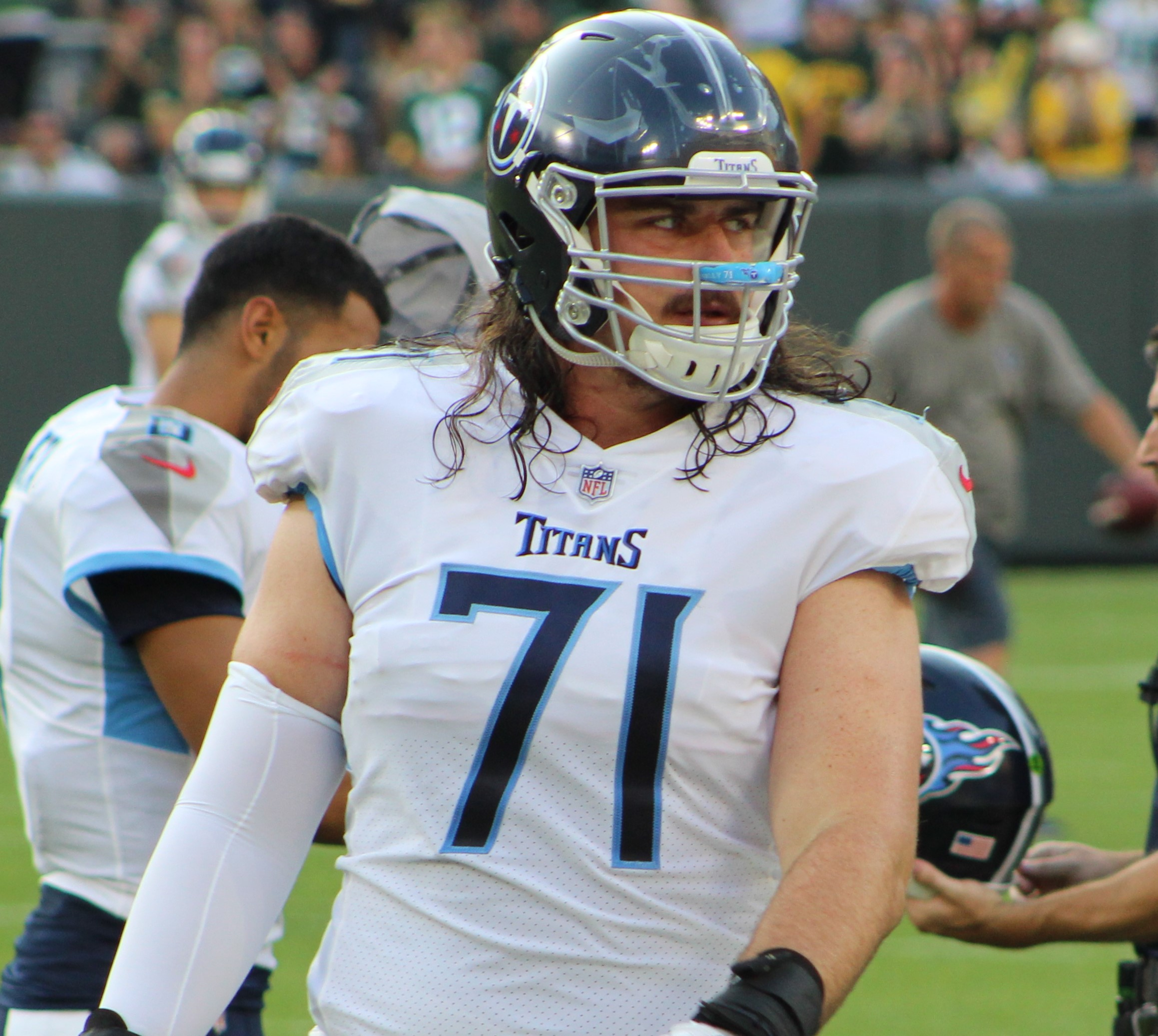
Kelly in 2018

In 2018, Kelly played in 11 games, starting five as the Titans finished 9–7 for the third straight season. During a Week 14 30–9 victory over the Jacksonville Jaguars, he replaced Lewan when he left the game with an injury and subsequently replaced an injured Jack Conklin in the same game after Lewan returned. Kelly then started the final three games of the season as Conklin was placed on injured reserve. In those final three games, Kelly blocked for Derrick Henry as he won AFC Offensive Player of the Month for December.

==== 2019 season ====
Kelly played in 15 games in 2019 and started the first four games of the season in place of Taylor Lewan as he was suspended for PED violations.

On November 24, 2019, Kelly scored his first NFL touchdown on a one-yard pass from Ryan Tannehill in a 42–20 victory against the Jacksonville Jaguars. The Titans once again finished the regular season with a 9–7 record, and qualified for the playoffs, where he played in both upset victories against the New England Patriots and the Baltimore Ravens. On January 19, 2020, Kelly scored his second career touchdown during a 35–24 loss to the Kansas City Chiefs in the AFC Championship Game, and became the heaviest player, at 321 pounds (146 kg), in NFL history to catch a postseason touchdown pass.

==== 2020 season ====
Set to become a free agent after the 2019 season, Kelly signed a three-year, $21 million contract extension with the Titans on March 16, 2020.

Incumbent starting right tackle Jack Conklin departed to the Cleveland Browns in free agency during the 2020 offseason. The Titans drafted offensive tackle Isaiah Wilson in the first round of the 2020 NFL draft. Kelly was expected to compete with him to be the starting right tackle, but Wilson only appeared in a single game. Kelly started all 16 games and helped Derrick Henry rush for over 2,000 yards on the way to an 11–5 record. However, the Titans lost 20–13 to the Ravens in the Wild Card Round.

Kelly was released on March 16, 2021.

=== Green Bay Packers ===
Kelly signed with the Green Bay Packers on July 29, 2021. He played in 10 games during the 2021 regular season, starting the last four in place of injured starting right tackle Billy Turner.

The Packers finished with a 13–4 record and the #1-seed in the NFC. Kelly started at right tackle during the Packers' divisional round playoff loss against the San Francisco 49ers while Turner, who had returned from injury played left tackle in place of injured starter David Bakhtiari.

=== Indianapolis Colts ===
On May 10, 2022, Kelly signed with the Indianapolis Colts. He was waived during final roster cuts on August 30, but was re-signed to a one-year contract the next day.

=== Philadelphia Eagles (second stint) ===
On July 19, 2023, Kelly signed a one-year contract with the Eagles. He was released on August 27 as part of final roster cuts.

=== New York Jets ===
On October 11, 2023, Kelly was signed to the New York Jets practice squad. On October 31, he was signed to the active roster. Kelly was released on November 22.

== Personal life ==
Kelly is married to his wife Jerianna, and they have three daughters: Eden, Isla, and Emilia. They have two dogs, Harley and Freddy. In 2019, Kelly earned an MBA from the Kelley School of Business at Indiana University.

Kelly's brother is NFL coach Tim Kelly.
