= Harold Hellenbrand =

American academic administrator (born 1953)

- Born: Harold Hellenbrand; 1953 (age 72–73); Brooklyn, New York, U.S.
- Education: Harvard College (B.A.); Stanford University (Ph.D.)
- Occupation: University administrator
- Known for: The Unfinished Revolution: Education and Politics in the Thought of Thomas Jefferson

Harold Hellenbrand (born 1953) is a retired American college professor, administrator, and author. He has held several faculty and administrative roles at various institutions, including the Chair of the English department at California State University, San Bernardino, Dean at the University of Minnesota Duluth, Dean at California Polytechnic State University, San Luis Obispo, and Provost and Vice President of Academic Affairs at California State University, Northridge, where until his retirement he taught in the English department. His biography of Thomas Jefferson, The Unfinished Revolution: Education and Politics in the Thought of Thomas Jefferson was published in 1990.

== Personal life ==
Hellenbrand was the only child of Julius A. Hellenbrand, an attorney and justice of the New York State Supreme Court, and Gail Hellenbrand, a politician. According to a 2012 interview with Cal State Northridge's student newspaper, The Sundial, Hellenbrand wanted be an architect when he was a child because he always liked design and mathematics. He played soccer, baseball, and football, with soccer being his favorite sport.

== Education ==
Hellenbrand attended Poly Prep in Brooklyn, graduating in 1971. He earned his bachelor's degree in English and American literature from Harvard College in 1975. He later received his doctorate in modern thought and literature from Stanford University in 1980.

== Career ==
Hellenbrand started his career as a faculty member in the English Department, and later as chair of the department, at California State University, San Bernardino in 1982. In 1994, he moved to Minnesota where he served as Dean and Professor at the College of Liberal Arts at the University of Minnesota, Duluth until 1998. He then served as Dean and Professor at the College of Liberal Arts at Cal Poly, San Luis Obispo from 1998 to 2004. He then served as Provost and Vice President for Academic Affairs at California State University, Northridge, and before his retirement, he taught as a professor in the English Department there as well.

=== Role at California State University, Northridge ===
Hellenbrand became Provost and Vice President for Academic Affairs at California State University, Northridge in 2004. He served in this capacity until January 2012, when he was appointed Interim President at CSUN by the Chancellor of the California State University (CSU) system. Hellenbrand served in the interim role until Dianne F. Harrison was appointed as the president of CSUN in June 2012, when he returned to the provost and vice president position. Hellenbrand focused on K-12 linkages, faculty retention efforts, and commitment to diversity. He stepped down from the provost position in 2015 and taught in the CSUN English department for several years until he retired with emeritus status.

=== Media ===
- “Kristyan Kouri and Harold Hellenbrand: College is a wise investment for all”: published in the Los Angeles Daily News on June 22, 2011, followed by an update from August 28, 2017. The article presents the argument that a college education is important therefore, there should be better funding in order for California residents to have more access to college education. Additionally, it argues that there should be programs that specifically help students with certain needs such as the Educational Opportunity Program (EOP). Kouri and Hellenbrand gave two testimonies of two students who were involved in gangs. Isabelle, one of the students, explained how EOP and Cal State, Northridge helped her to leave the gang life and realize her dreams. Kouri and Hellenbrand emphasize how crucial it is for the public to understand that cuts to the California education system is shortsighted and although it will cost money, the state as a whole will benefit in the long run. The articles argues that, in the long term, people with a college education earn more money, which results in more tax revenues, which also results in more money for the state for the state to use on population needs. Kouri and Hellenbrand conclude their article by reiterating how educational institutions like Cal State, Northridge are vital to the well-being of all California residents and urged voters to demand more investment in education from the state.
- “Kristyan Kouri and Harold Hellenbrand: Economic barriers to college hit Hispanics especially hard”: published in the Los Angeles Daily News titled “Economic barriers to college hit Hispanics especially hard” on August 19, 2011, followed by an update August 28, 2017. The article lays out what it means for disadvantaged communities, such as the Latin community, to receive a college education. The article tells the story of 90-year-old Nellie Saenz Chavez and her struggle of holding a low-paying jobs while also being a mother and having a husband who worked all day as well. Although Chavez was able to obtain a more decent life in her later years, her story is a prime example of the lack of educational opportunities that existed for Hispanics before modern times.

== Awards ==
=== Don Dorsey Excellence in Mentoring Award ===
Hellenbrand was the 2017 recipient of the Don Dorsey Excellence in Mentoring Award. The award was founded by the staff in the CSUN Faculty Mentor Program and EOP. It was named after educational psychology professor, Don Dorsey, who helped develop CSUN's first mentor training program. The award recognizes faculty and staff who made exceptional contributions to mentoring past and present students from diverse backgrounds and communities.

=== Eileen Tosney Award from the American Association of University Administrators ===
Hellenbrand received the Eileen Tosney Award in 2014 for his work as an administrator in the field of higher education.

=== William M. Plater Award from American Association of State Colleges and Universities ===
In March 2015, Hellenbran was awarded The William M. Plator Award honoring his leadership in civic engagement. It was given to Hellenbrand for his efforts in fighting for student retention and encouraging diversity in academia.

== Works/Publications ==
Harold Hellenbrand has authored the following books, essays, and articles:

- Hellenbrand, Harold. “Roads to Happiness: Rhetorical and Philosophical Design in Jefferson’s ‘Notes on the State of Virginia.’” Early American Literature, Vol. 20, No. 1. University of North Carolina Press, 1985.
- Hellenbrand, Harold. “Not ‘to Destroy But to Fulfil’: Jefferson, Indians, and Republican Dispensation.” Eighteenth-Century Studies, Vol. 18, No. 4. Johns Hopkins University Press, 1985.
- Hellenbrand, Harold. “Speech, after Silence: Alice Walker's The Third Life of Grange Copeland.” Black American Literature Forum, Vol. 20, No. 1/2. African American Review (St. Louis University), 1986.
- Hellenbrand, Harold. The Unfinished Revolution: Education and Politics in the Thought of Thomas Jefferson. University of Delaware Press, 1990.
- Hellenbrand, Harold. “The Roots of Democracy.” The William and Mary Quarterly, Vol. 48, No. 1. Omohundro Institute of Early American History and Culture, 1991.
- Hellenbrand, Harold. “Account, Accounting, Accountability.” Profession, Modern Language Association, 2002.
