= Eric Olsen (American football) =

American football player (born 1988)

No. 69
- Position: Guard

Personal information
- Born: June 16, 1988 (age 38); Staten Island, New York, U.S.
- Listed height: 6 ft 4 in (1.93 m)
- Listed weight: 306 lb (139 kg)

Career information
- High school: Poly Prep (Brooklyn, New York)
- College: Notre Dame
- NFL draft: 2010: 6th round, 183rd overall pick

Career history
- Denver Broncos (2010); Washington Redskins (2011)*; New Orleans Saints (2012–2013); Pittsburgh Steelers (2013); Tennessee Titans (2014)*; New Orleans Saints (2014); Tennessee Titans (2014); Cleveland Browns (2015)*
- * Offseason or practice squad member only

Awards and highlights
- Third-team All-American (2009)

Career NFL statistics
- Games played: 23
- Games started: 4
- Stats at Pro Football Reference

Eric Olsen (born June 16, 1988) is an American former professional football player who played as an offensive guard in the National Football League (NFL). He played college football for the Notre Dame Fighting Irish and was selected by the Denver Broncos in sixth round of the 2010 NFL draft. He was also a member of the Washington Redskins, Pittsburgh Steelers, and New Orleans Saints.

== Early life ==
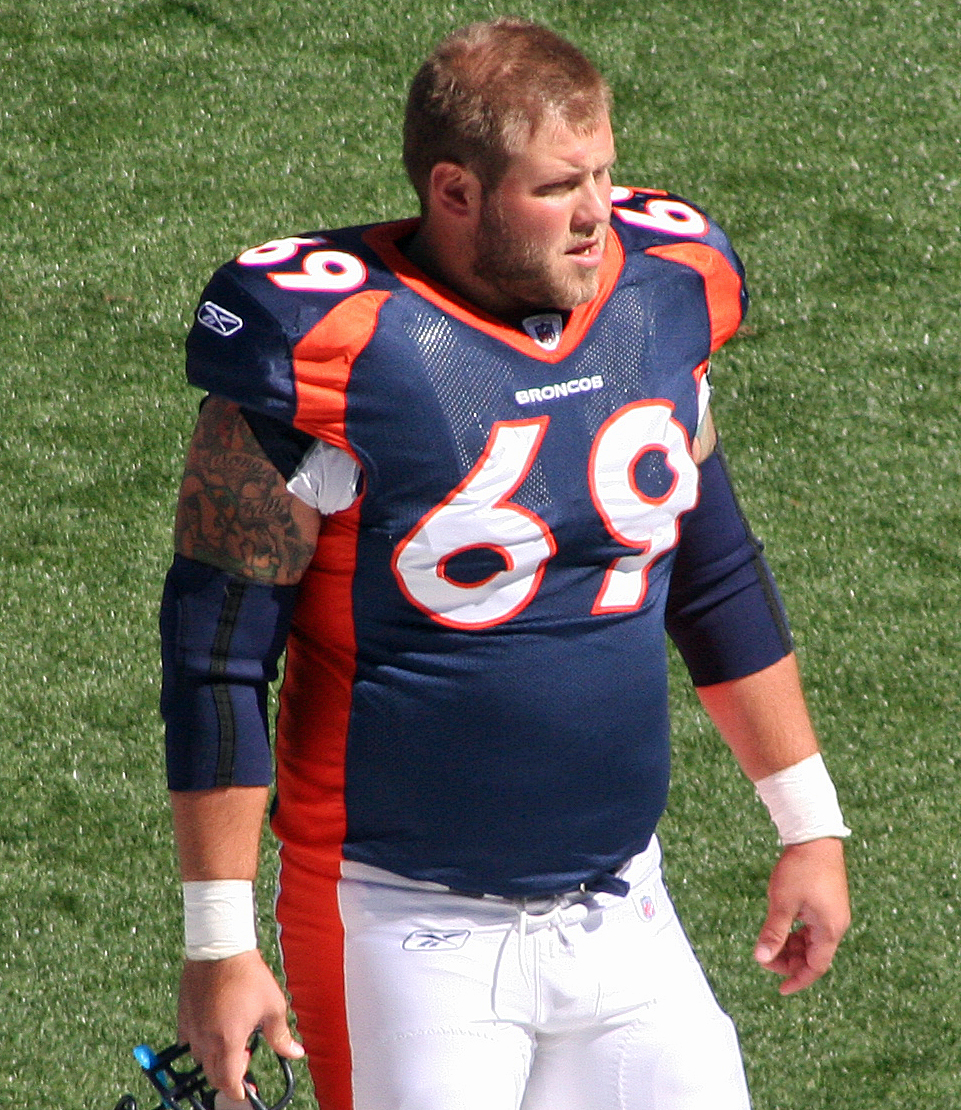
Olsen with the Denver Broncos in 2010

Olsen attended Poly Prep Country Day School in Brooklyn, New York, where he was both an offensive tackle as well as a defensive end. At offensive tackle, he was never charged with a sack to his quarterback. As a defensive end, he recorded 53 tackles, eight sacks and forced three fumbles.

== College career ==
Olsen played in 44 games during his four years at the University of Notre Dame. He started the last 31 of those games. During his junior and senior years combined he only allowed four quarterbacks sacks.

== Professional career ==
Pre-draft measurables
Height	Weight	Arm length	40-yard dash	10-yard split	20-yard split	20-yard shuttle	Three-cone drill	Vertical jump	Broad jump	Bench press
6 ft 4 in (1.93 m)	306 lb (139 kg)	32 1/2 in (0.83 m)	5.25 s	1.87 s	3.03 s	4.82 s	7.50 s	29 1/2 in (0.75 m)	8 ft 09 in (2.67 m)	35 reps
All values from NFL Combine

=== Denver Broncos ===
Olsen was projected to be drafted in the fifth or sixth round during the 2010 NFL draft. He was one of the top performers at the bench press, vertical jump and the 3-cone drill. Olsen was selected by the Denver Broncos in the sixth round (183rd overall). He was expected to compete with J. D. Walton for the starting center job for the Broncos. He was waived by the Broncos September 3, 2011.

=== Washington Redskins ===
Olsen spent the 2011 season on Washington's practice squad.

=== New Orleans Saints (first stint) ===
With the New Orleans Saints heading into the 2011 playoffs, the team signed Olsen off the Redskins' practice squad on January 2, 2012. He was inactive in both of the Saints' games in the playoffs.

He remained with New Orleans for the 2012 season, playing in all 16 games and starting 4 as a blocking tight end. In 2013 was placed on injured reserve during training camp, and later released.

=== Pittsburgh Steelers ===
He signed with the Steelers but did not play during the regular season.

=== Tennessee Titans (first stint) ===
On April 3, 2014, Olsen signed with the Tennessee Titans, but he was released at the end of training camp.

=== New Orleans Saints (second stint) ===
The Saints brought Olsen back for a second stint with the team on October 22, 2014. He was expected to provide additional depth on the line after an injury to Jonathan Goodwin meant that backup center Tim Lelito would be starting. He was released on November 12, 2014.

=== Tennessee Titans (second stint) ===
Olsen returned to the Titans after they signed him on November 25, 2014.

=== Cleveland Browns ===
The Cleveland Browns signed Olsen on May 26, 2015. On September 5, 2015, he was released by the Browns.

== Personal life ==
Olsen has one brother, Drew, a former safety at Gettysburg College. His father, Andy Olsen, was a New York City firefighter. Just three days before the 9/11 attacks, his father was promoted to Lieutenant. Therefore, he was in officer training on September 11, and not with Ladder 80, his firehouse at the time. When his father finally arrived at the World Trade Center site, both towers had already collapsed. A few days later, when he was digging through the rubble, his father found a truck from his firehouse buried and destroyed. None of the firefighters in that particular unit survived.
