= R. M. Koster =

American novelist

Richard Morton Koster (1934) is an American novelist best known for the Tinieblas trilogy—The Prince (1972), The Dissertation (1975), Mandragon (1979)—set in an imaginary Central American republic much like Panama, the author's home for many years. He is the author, besides, of two other novels, Carmichael's Dog (1992) and Glass Mountain (2001), and (with Panamanian man of letters Guillermo Sánchez Borbón), of In the Time of the Tyrants (1990), a history of the Torrijos-Noriega dictatorship in Panama.

== Background ==
Koster was born in Brooklyn, New York, attended Poly Prep, and has degrees from both Yale and New York University. He taught English at the National University of Panama, and from 1964 to 2001 was a member of the faculty of the Florida State University, serving at its Panama branch. He has lectured in English and Spanish at universities in the United States and Latin America. In 2003 he was a visiting professor at Southern Methodist University.

Koster has had parallel careers in politics and journalism. He was a member of the Democratic National Committee from 1967 to 1996, served on many Democratic panels, and wrote presidential debate copy for Senator John Kerry in 2004. During the 1960s and '70s he reported from Panama for the Copely News Service and Newsweek magazine. He has reported more recently for the New York Times and has contributed prolifically to the Spanish language press in Panama. He was interviewed on National Public Radio about his book, In the Time of the Tyrants.

Koster went to Panama as a soldier in the late 1950s and has lived there since. His wife, Otilia Tejeira, was a soloist with Panama's National Ballet and has had a subsequent career as a human rights monitor. They have two children and three grandchildren.

McDowell Bible College named its English and humanities program the Richard Koster School of Humanities.

== Tinieblas trilogy ==
Each novel focuses on a larger-than-life protagonist around whom the action revolves. The author himself likens the books to the panels of a triptych, "since each of the three is complete in itself and since they need not be considered in the order of their publication." Major characters from one book appear as minor characters in the others, and vice versa. The unifying "character" of all three is Tinieblas itself.

"The Prince" is introduced by a list of the Presidents of the Republic of Tinieblas, some of whom were illegitimate ("appointed with the advice and consent of the U.S. Ambassador") and some of whom left office spectacularly ("deposed and fed to sharks," "held office for 36 hours and resigned when his ammunition ran out.") The narration is taken up by Enrique "Kiki" Sancudo, son of the man who has most often been president. Now a quadriplegic, blasted into a wheelchair by the gun of his only friend, he reviews the histories of his country and his father along with his own as a complete man of action—wrestler, arms smuggler, Olympic champion, Lothario, gambler at Yale, Ambassador to Paris, husband of a movie star, and eventually presidential candidate. All the while he campaigns for his father's fourth re-election and plans a fiendish revenge.

Amid the struggles of a Central American Republic—poverty, political instability, and disastrous financial intrigues—the novel intersperses bouts of comedy and magical realism. For example, Kiki at one point in his smuggling career becomes so calloused that he is literally bulletproof; his father runs one election campaign entirely by astrology; conflict over an American military base near the capital of Tinieblas causes a "flag plague" in which activists break out in stinging rashes of their national colors.

The Dissertation presents itself as a doctoral thesis with contrapuntal stories in the text and notes. A biography of the only honest President of Tinieblas, Leon Fuertes (assassinated 1964), written by his son, Camilo, the notes (in the manner of Nabokov's "Pale Fire") advance Camilo's story of academic and political intrigue and marital difficulty, while the body of the narrative relates the ancestry and history of his father. Cammilo's research methods are unique: he interviews spirits of the dead for information before resorting to libraries and published sources.

"Mandragon" relates the tale of the title character, a Tinieblas native, hermaphrodite, and circus freak who develops genuine powers of psychic healing, telepathy, and prophecy. After a Charles Manson-like existence in New York (complete with female hippie entourage but minus the crime of murder), he returns to his native country and is enmeshed in a deadly intrigue involving the President of the country, an affair with his wife, and the machinations of a Howard-Hughes like billionaire on the run.

Each protagonist is a political leader, in The Prince an adventurer on the model of Cesare Borgia, in Mandragon a charismatic like Savonarola. For the subject of The Dissertation political ambition is a disease, yet he accepts leadership when it is thrust upon him. Koster's storytelling seems heavily influenced by Vladimir Nabokov and the magical realists such as Gabriel Garcia Marquez. The prose abounds with flights of fancy, spectacular allusions to literature, chess terms, world history and theology, along with multiple puns in Spanish and English. The existence of the supernatural is taken for granted: President Sancudo's astrology-directed campaign is immensely successful; Camilo Fuertes's interviews with ghosts yield provable facts; Mandragon successfully extracts cancer tumors from patients. The tone is relentlessly black-comic but many of the base events portrayed—elections, smuggling, war—seem perfectly plausible.

The three books received considerable acclaim, including a National Book Award nomination for The Prince.

== Other works ==
Carmichael's Dog (1992), takes place in a parallel universe wherein the United States is a kingdom, the Army's service pistol is an "Ingersol," and characters quote the poet-playwright Robin Speckshaft, whose works include Launcelot and Guinevere, Ornella Whore of Tunis, and Malaspina Duke of Ancona (the latter's protagonist has his dwarf strangled for making him smile). Carmichael, a best-selling science fiction writer, is unknowingly possessed by demons representing all Seven Deadly Sins (the novel is narrated by the first demon to possess him, who causes him to be slothful). The ultimate battle for possession of his soul ensues when he acquires an unlikely champion: a faithful Pomeranian dog, who instinctively knows something is up, and what to do about it.

== Critical Appreciation ==
John le Carré thanked Koster in the acknowledgements to his The Tailor of Panama for his great help in providing local history and details. Larry J. McDowell, author of Alabama Slim: It All Started in Korea, acknowledged, "to Richard Dick Koster of Panama, who wrote and inspired others, who taught me to love literature and who discouraged me from accepting mediocrity in myself— to work to overcome weaknesses, as other professors just told me that I had no talent."

== Partial bibliography ==
- The Prince (1972)
- The Dissertation (1975)
- Mandragon (1979)
- In the Time of Tyrants: Panama : 1968-1990, by R. M. Koster and Guillermo Sanchez (1991)
- Carmichael's Dog (1992)
- The Glass Mountain (2001)
