= Isaiah Wilson =

American football player (born 1999)

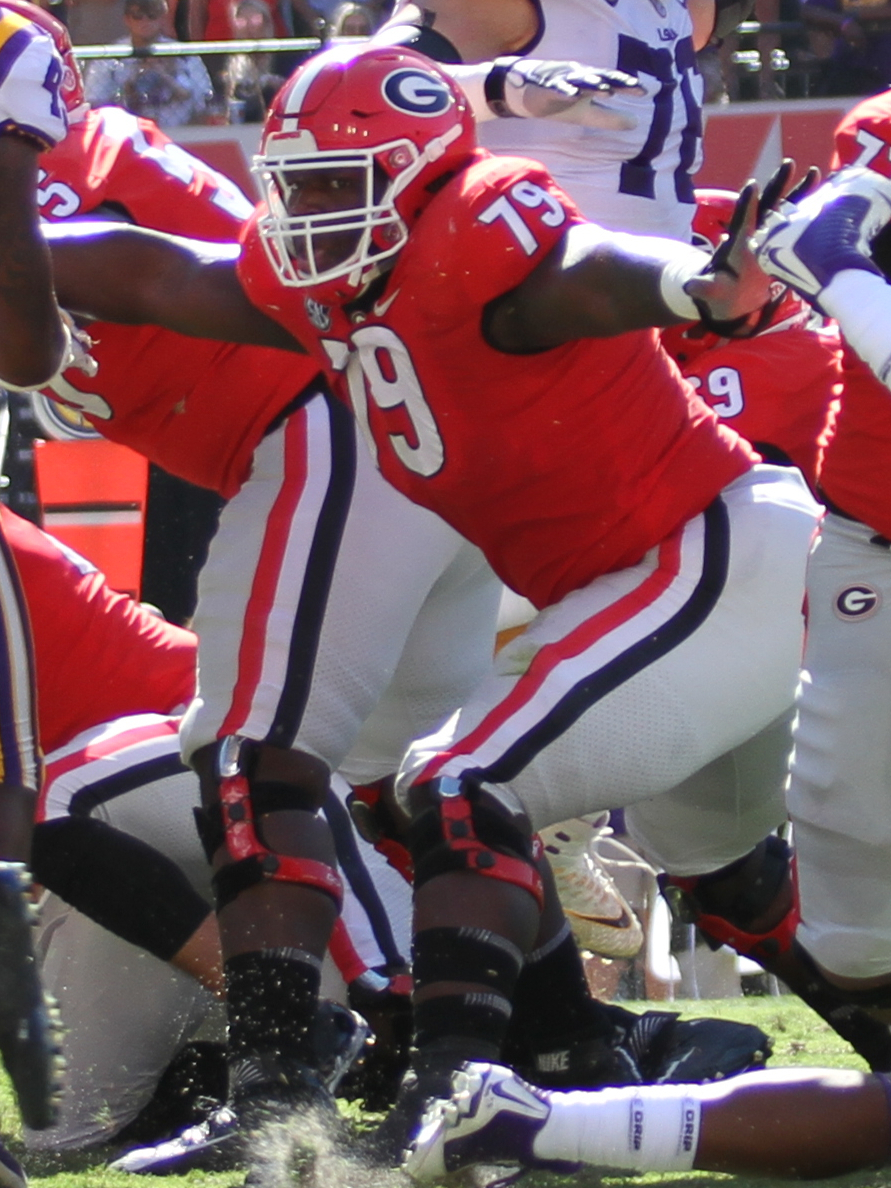
- Wilson with the Georgia Bulldogs in 2018

No. 79
- Position: Offensive tackle

Personal information
- Born: February 12, 1999 (age 27); Brooklyn, New York, U.S.
- Listed height: 6 ft 6 in (1.98 m)
- Listed weight: 350 lb (159 kg)

Career information
- High school: Poly Prep (Brooklyn, New York)
- College: Georgia (2017–2019)
- NFL draft: 2020: 1st round, 29th overall pick

Career history
- Tennessee Titans (2020); Miami Dolphins (2021)*; New York Giants (2021)*
- * Offseason or practice squad member only

Awards and highlights
- Second-team All-SEC (2019)

Career NFL statistics
- Games played: 1
- Stats at Pro Football Reference

Isaiah Terrell Wilson (born February 12, 1999) is an American former professional football player who was an offensive tackle for one season with the Tennessee Titans of the National Football League (NFL). He played college football for the Georgia Bulldogs and was selected by the Titans in the first round of the 2020 NFL draft. Since dropping out of the NFL, Wilson has pursued a career as a rapper.

Wilson's tenure with the Titans was characterized by several off-field legal issues as well as a brief suspension for violating team rules. He appeared in one game as a rookie, playing just four snaps, three of which were kneel-downs. In March 2021, Wilson was traded to the Miami Dolphins but was waived three days later after he refused the team's efforts to help him. Wilson then signed with the practice squad of the New York Giants during the 2021 season.

== Early life ==
Wilson attended Poly Prep in Brooklyn, New York. He played in the 2017 Under Armour All-America Game. Wilson was a consensus five-star recruit. He was the 16th highest-rated player and the fifth highest-rated offensive tackle in the class of 2017. He committed to play college football for the University of Georgia on December 16, 2016.

== College career ==
Wilson redshirted his first year at Georgia in 2017. He became a starter in 2018 and started in all but one game in the 2018 and 2019 seasons. Wilson was named to the second-team All-Southeastern Conference in 2019. He entered the 2020 NFL draft, forgoing two years of college eligibility.

== Professional career ==
Pre-draft measurables
Height	Weight	Arm length	Hand span	Wingspan	40-yard dash	10-yard split	20-yard split	20-yard shuttle	Three-cone drill	Vertical jump	Broad jump	Bench press	Wonderlic
6 ft 6 1/2 in (1.99 m)	350 lb (159 kg)	35 1/2 in (0.90 m)	10 1/4 in (0.26 m)	7 ft 0 3/8 in (2.14 m)	5.32 s	1.79 s	3.03 s	5.07 s	8.26 s	29.0 in (0.74 m)	9 ft 2 in (2.79 m)	26 reps	28
All values from NFL Combine

=== Tennessee Titans ===
Wilson became the 29th overall draft pick in the first round of the 2020 NFL draft when he was chosen by the Tennessee Titans. Wilson was expected to compete with veteran Dennis Kelly for the open starting right tackle position. Wilson was placed on the reserve/COVID-19 list by the team at the start of training camp on July 28, 2020, before returning to the active roster when he signed a four-year rookie contract five days later. He was placed back on the reserve/COVID-19 list on September 6. Wilson was activated from the reserve/COVID list on October 10. On December 5, Wilson was suspended for the Titans' Week 13 game against the Cleveland Browns due to a violation of team rules. He was reinstated from suspension two days later, but was placed on the reserve/non-football illness list on December 9. Wilson finished the season playing in one game, appearing for only four snaps (three on offense and one on special teams) of the Titans' Week 12 45–26 road victory over the Indianapolis Colts.

On February 22, 2021, Wilson posted and then deleted a tweet saying he would no longer play football as a Titan.

=== Miami Dolphins ===
On March 17, 2021, Wilson and a seventh-round pick in the 2022 draft were traded to the Miami Dolphins in exchange for a seventh-round pick in the 2021 draft. He was waived by the Dolphins three days later after showing up late for his team physical and missing two workouts.

=== New York Giants ===
On September 29, 2021, Wilson signed with the practice squad of the New York Giants. On January 4, 2022, he was released.

On July 24, 2023, Wilson was suspended three games by the NFL for an undisclosed reason.

== Legal issues ==
On September 11, 2020, Wilson was arrested for DUI. On January 7, 2021, he was arrested for leading police on a 140-mile-per-hour chase. Police found 3.4 grams of marijuana in his car. On March 24, Wilson was charged with felony fleeing or attempting to elude a police officer, speeding in a construction zone, reckless driving, reckless conduct, possession of less than 1 ounce of marijuana and possession and use of drug-related objects.

== Music career ==
In April 2021, under the stage name GGBowzer, Wilson released a hip hop EP titled Layup Lines.
