= The Dissertation (novel) =

1972 novel by R. M. Koster

- Cover of 1989 paperback edition
- Author: R. M. Koster
- Language: English
- Genre: Novel
- Publisher: W. W. Norton
- Publication date: 1972
- Publication place: United States
- Media type: Print (hardback & paperback)
- Pages: 438 pp
- ISBN: 0-393-30648-8
- OCLC: 19630176
- Dewey Decimal: 813/.54 20
- LC Class: PS3561.O84 D5 1989

The Dissertation is a novel by R. M. Koster, part of the Tinieblas trilogy.

The book is a mock-PhD thesis, written by the son of the dictator of Tinieblas, recounting his father's rise and fall in a satire of academic prose, while the footnotes narrate the sad life of the doctoral candidate, in the manner of Vladimir Nabokov's Pale Fire.

The Dissertation makes an appearance in the 2013 Stephen King novel Joyland where it is being read by the character Annie Ross.
