= Armin Tehrany =

American surgeon and professor

- Born: Philadelphia, Pennsylvania
- Education: New York University School of Medicine
- Medical career
- Profession: orthopaedic surgeon
- Institutions: Manhattan Orthopedic Care
- Sub-specialties: Minimally invasive, arthroscopic shoulder and knee surgery

Armin M. Tehrany is an American orthopaedic surgeon, assistant clinical professor of orthopedic surgery at the Icahn School of Medicine at Mount Sinai in New York City, and film producer.

He is a board-certified orthopedic surgeon specializing in conditions of the shoulder and knee including rotator cuff tears, labrum tears, meniscus tears, cartilage lesions, patella dislocations, and tears of the anterior cruciate ligament. He specializes in minimally-invasive, arthroscopic surgery of the shoulder and knee.

Tehrany is the author of a number of articles and was listed among New York Magazine's "Best Doctors" for 2016. Castle Connolly listed him twice among New York's "Top Doctors".

In 2015, Tehrany became an executive producer of the feature film Birth of A Nation – a biopic about Nat Turner, the leader of the slave rebellion in 1831.

== Biography ==
Tehrany was born in Philadelphia, Pennsylvania and raised in Staten Island, New York. His parents are Persian Jews who immigrated from Iran. His father, who was the first physician (a urologist) in his family, inspired him to pursue a medical career. He speaks English, Farsi and Spanish.

Tehrany graduated from Polytechnic Preparatory Country Day School in 1987 and later attended Brooklyn College's 7-year BA/MD program. After studying William Shakespeare at Goldsmiths, University of London, Tehrany returned to the United States and pursued his career in medicine over the next 10 years. He studied general medicine at the New York University School of Medicine, graduating in 1994. From 1994 to 1999 he trained in the specialty of orthopedic surgery and sports medicine at Lenox Hill Hospital in Manhattan. During that period, he worked with the team physicians for the New York Jets, New York Rangers, and New York Islanders. From 1999 to 2000 he did sub-specialty fellowship training in arthroscopic shoulder and knee surgery at Baylor College of Medicine in San Antonio, Texas with Dr. Stephen Burkhart.

Tehrany began his practice of orthopedic surgery in Staten Island and was a lecturer, teaching minimally-invasive surgery techniques at national and international orthopedic surgery conferences. In 2004, Tehrany joined the faculty of the Department of Orthopedic Surgery at the Mount Sinai School of Medicine in New York City. In 2005, he opened his Manhattan office on Madison Avenue.

== Professional career and awards ==
Tehrany is an assistant clinical professor of orthopedic surgery at the Icahn School of Medicine at Mount Sinai in New York City, where he teaches medical students, orthopedic residents, and the shoulder fellows. He is a member of the Arthroscopy Association of North America and the American Academy of Orthopedic Surgeons. He serves on the board of directors for the New York State Society of Orthopedic Surgeons, as well as the Physicians Advisory Board for the New York County Medical Society. He also serves on the board of directors of the New York University Alumni Association. His interests involve the development of minimally invasive techniques in the management of shoulder and cartilage disorders. His orthopedic research interests began at the Hospital for Special Surgery where he first published work on cartilage metabolism in 1993. He serves as a journal peer reviewer for Arthroscopy: the Journal of Arthroscopic and Related Surgery.

He won awards for his work:

- “Best Doctors”, New York Magazine, 2015 and 2016
- "Top Doctors", Super Doctors, 2015 and 2016
- "Top Doctors", Castle Connolly Medical Ltd., Orthopedic Surgery, 2014, 2015, 2016 and 2017

Since 2018, he's been serving as a NYPD honorary surgeon.

== Publications ==
Tehrany has published and presented his research at local, national, and international meetings on topics involving the shoulder, hip, and spine. Partial chronological list:

- Callaway, G.H.; O'Brien S.J; Tehrany, A.M.; (1996): Chiari I malformation and spinal cord injury: cause for concern in contact athletes?, Medicine & Science in Sports & Exercise, Vol. 28, Issue 10, p1218-1220
- Torzilli, P.A.; Tehrany, A.M.; Grigiene, R.; Young, E.; (1996): Effects of misoprostol and prostaglandin E2 on proteoglycan biosynthesis and loss in unloaded and loaded articular cartilage explants, Prostaglandins, Vol. 52, Issue 3, p157-173
- Tehrany, A.M.; Burkhart, S.S.; (2002): Massive Rotator Cuff Tears: Results of Arthroscopic Partial Repair (SS-53), Journal of Arthroscopic and Related Surgery, Vol. 18, Issue 5, p43–44
- Burkhart, S.S.; Tehrany, A.M.; (2002): Arthroscopic subscapularis tendon repair: Technique and preliminary results, Journal of Arthroscopic and Related Surgery, Vol. 18, Issue 5, p454–463
- Burkhart, S.S.; DeBeer, J.F.; Tehrany, A.M.; Parten, P.M.; (2002): Quantifying glenoid bone loss arthroscopically in shoulder instability, Journal of Arthroscopic and Related Surgery, Vol. 18, Issue 5, p488–491
- Braman, J.P.; Tehrany, A.M.; Flatow, E.L.; (2005): Rotator cuff repair, The American Journal of Orthopedics, Vol. 34, Issue 6, p267-270
- Richards, D.P.; Burkhart, S.S.; Tehrany, A.M.; Wirth, M.A; (2007): The Subscapularis Footprint: An Anatomic Description of Its Insertion Site, Journal of Arthroscopic and Related Surgery, Vol. 23, Issue 3, p251–254

== Executive producer ==
In 2015, Tehrany, became an executive producer of the feature film Birth of A Nation, directed by Nate Parker. The film stars Parker as Nat Turner, the African-American slave who led a slave rebellion of both free and enslaved blacks in Southampton County, Virginia on August 21, 1831, that resulted in 60 white and more black deaths. The film was to make its world premiere in competition at the Sundance Film Festival in 2016, and won the Audience Award and Grand Jury Prize in the U.S. Dramatic Competition. Fox Searchlight Pictures bought worldwide rights to the film in a $17.5 million deal, the largest deal at the film festival to date.

Thirst Street is the second film produced by Tehrany. It is an American-French comedy drama romance film directed by Nathan Silver, from a screenplay by Silver and C. Mason Wells. It had its world premiere at the Tribeca Film Festival on April 21, 2017, and was released on September 20, 2017, by Samuel Goldwyn Films.
