= 2017 Clemson Tigers football team =

American college football season

2017 Clemson Tigers football

ACC champion ACC Atlantic Division champion

ACC Championship Game, W 38–3 vs. Miami (FL)

Sugar Bowl (CFP Semifinal), L 6–24 vs. Alabama
- Conference: Atlantic Coast Conference
- Atlantic Division

Ranking
- Coaches: No. 4
- AP: No. 4
- Record: 12–2 (7–1 ACC)
- Head coach: Dabo Swinney (9th full, 10th overall season)
- Co-offensive coordinators: Tony Elliott (3rd season); Jeff Scott (3rd season)
- Offensive scheme: Spread
- Defensive coordinator: Brent Venables (6th season)
- Base defense: 4–3
- Home stadium: Memorial Stadium

2017 Atlantic Coast Conference football standings
	Conf.			Overall
Team	W		L	W		L
Atlantic Division
No. 4 Clemson xy$^	7	–	1	12	–	2
No. 23 NC State	6	–	2	9	–	4
Wake Forest	4	–	4	8	–	5
Louisville	4	–	4	8	–	5
Boston College	4	–	4	7	–	6
Florida State	3	–	5	7	–	6
Syracuse	2	–	6	4	–	8
Coastal Division
No. 13 Miami (FL) xy	7	–	1	10	–	3
No. 24 Virginia Tech	5	–	3	9	–	4
Georgia Tech	4	–	4	5	–	6
Virginia	3	–	5	6	–	7
Pittsburgh	3	–	5	5	–	7
Duke	3	–	5	7	–	6
North Carolina	1	–	7	3	–	9
Championship: Clemson 38, Miami 3
^ – College Football Playoff participant; $ – Conference champion; x – Division champion/co-champions; y – Championship game participant; Rankings from AP Poll

The 2017 Clemson Tigers football team represented Clemson University during the 2017 NCAA Division I FBS football season. The Tigers were led by head coach Dabo Swinney in his ninth full year and tenth overall since taking over midway through 2008 season. They played their home games at Memorial Stadium, also known as "Death Valley", and competed in the Atlantic Division of the Atlantic Coast Conference.

Clemson won the ACC for the third consecutive season by beating Miami (FL) in the ACC Championship game, 38–3. They received their third straight bid to the College Football Playoff, earning the number one seed. The Tigers fell to eventual national champion Alabama in the semifinal game played at the Sugar Bowl, 24–6.

== Schedule ==
Clemson announced their schedule for the 2017 season on January 24, 2017. The Tigers' schedule consisted of 7 home games and 5 away games. Clemson hosted conference opponents Boston College, Florida State, Georgia Tech, and Wake Forest, and traveled to Louisville, NC State, Syracuse, and Virginia Tech. The Tigers hosted out of conference games against Kent State, Auburn, and The Citadel, and traveled to arch rival South Carolina to close out the regular season. Clemson's out of conference opponents represented the MAC, SoCon, and SEC.

The Tigers played 10 total teams who played in the postseason in the 2016 season: 2 New Year's Six participants (Auburn and Florida State), 7 other bowl teams (Boston College, Georgia Tech, Louisville, NC State, South Carolina, Wake Forest, Virginia Tech), and 1 FCS playoff participant (Citadel).

Date	Time	Opponent	Rank	Site	TV	Result	Attendance
September 2	Noon	Kent State*	No. 5	Memorial Stadium; Clemson, SC	ESPN	W 56–3	80,121
September 9	7:00 p.m.	No. 13 Auburn*	No. 3	Memorial Stadium; Clemson, SC (rivalry)	ESPN	W 14–6	81,799
September 16	8:00 p.m.	at No. 14 Louisville	No. 3	Papa John's Cardinal Stadium; Louisville, KY (College GameDay)	ABC	W 47–21	55,588
September 23	3:30 p.m.	Boston College	No. 2	Memorial Stadium; Clemson, SC (O'Rourke–McFadden Trophy)	ESPN2	W 34–7	80,525
September 30	8:00 p.m.	at No. 12 Virginia Tech	No. 2	Lane Stadium; Blacksburg, VA (College GameDay)	ABC	W 31–17	65,632
October 7	Noon	Wake Forest^{†}	No. 2	Memorial Stadium; Clemson, SC	ESPN2	W 28–14	80,567
October 13	7:00 p.m.	at Syracuse	No. 2	Carrier Dome; Syracuse, NY	ESPN	L 24–27	42,475
October 28	8:00 p.m.	Georgia Tech	No. 7	Memorial Stadium; Clemson, SC (rivalry)	ABC/ESPN2	W 24–10	80,346
November 4	3:30 p.m.	at No. 20 NC State	No. 4	Carter–Finley Stadium; Raleigh, NC (Textile Bowl)	ABC	W 38–31	57,600
November 11	3:30 p.m.	Florida State	No. 4	Memorial Stadium; Clemson, SC (rivalry)	ESPN	W 31–14	81,436
November 18	12:20 p.m.	The Citadel*	No. 2	Memorial Stadium; Clemson, SC	ACCN	W 61–3	80,618
November 25	7:30 p.m.	at No. 24 South Carolina*	No. 3	Williams-Brice Stadium; Columbia, SC (Palmetto Bowl / SEC Nation)	ESPN	W 34–10	82,908
December 2	8:00 p.m.	vs. No. 7 Miami (FL)	No. 1	Bank of America Stadium; Charlotte, NC (ACC Championship Game) (College GameDay)	ABC	W 38–3	74,372
January 1, 2018	8:45 p.m.	vs. No. 4 Alabama*	No. 1	Mercedes-Benz Superdome; New Orleans, LA (Sugar Bowl–CFP Semifinal / rivalry / SEC Nation)	ESPN	L 6–24	72,360
*Non-conference game; ^{†}Homecoming; Rankings from AP Poll and CFP Rankings after October 31 released prior to game; All times are in Eastern time

== Rankings ==
Ranking movements Legend: ██ Increase in ranking ██ Decrease in ranking ( ) = First-place votes
	Week															
Poll	Pre	1	2	3	4	5	6	7	8	9	10	11	12	13	14	Final
AP	5	3	3 (1)	2 (15)	2 (8)	2 (17)	2 (18)	7	7	6	4	4	4	1 (27)	1 (43)	4
Coaches	5 (7)	3 (3)	2 (2)	2 (6)	2 (4)	2 (6)	2 (8)	8	7	5	4	3	3	1 (25)	1 (49)	4
CFP	Not released									4	4	2	3	1	1	Not released

== Game summaries ==
=== Kent State ===
Kent State Golden Flashes at Clemson Tigers − Game summary

Quarter	1	2	3	4	Total
Kent State	0	3	0	0	3
No. 5 Clemson	21	7	21	7	56

at Memorial Stadium • Clemson, SC

- Date: September 2, 2017
- Game time: 12:03 p.m.
- Game weather: Temperature: 75 °F (24 °C) • Wind: WSW 10 mph (16 km/h) • Weather: Sunny
- Referee: David Epperley
- TV announcers (ESPN): Beth Mowins (Play-by-Play), Anthony Becht (Color), Rocky Boiman (Sideline)

Game information

First quarter

- 13:42 CLEM TD – C.J. Fuller 26 yard run, (Greg Huegel PAT)
- 10:37 CLEM TD – Kelly Bryant 61 yard pass to Deon Cain, (Huegel PAT)
- 03:18 CLEM TD – Adam Choice 3 yard run, (Huegel PAT)

Second quarter

- 12:14 KENT FG – Shane Hynes 37 yard field goal
- 01:13 CLEM TD – Bryant 8 yard run, (Huegel PAT)

Third quarter

- 10:44 CLEM TD – C.J. Fuller 2 yard run, (Huegel PAT)
- 07:35 CLEM TD – Tavien Feaster 47 yard run, (Huegel PAT)
- 00:33 CLEM TD – Zerrick Cooper 14 yard pass to Cornell Powell, (Huegel PAT)

Fourth quarter

- 11:01 CLEM TD – Travis Etienne 4 yard run, (Alex Spence PAT)

Top passers

- CLEM – Kelly Bryant; 16–22, 236 yds, 1 TD, 1 INT
- KENT – Nick Holley; 1–4, 1 yd

Top rushers

- CLEM – Travis Etienne; 8 carries, 81 yds, 1 TD
- KENT – Nick Holley; 10 carries, 53 yds

Top Receiving

- CLEM – Deon Cain; 2 catches, 70 yds, 1 TD
- KENT – Justin Rankin; 1 catch, 1 yd

=== Auburn ===
Auburn Tigers at Clemson Tigers − Game summary

Quarter	1	2	3	4	Total
No. 13 Auburn	3	3	0	0	6
No. 3 Clemson	0	7	7	0	14

at Memorial Stadium • Clemson, SC

- Date: September 9, 2017
- Game time: 7:05 p.m.
- Game weather: Temperature: 75 °F (24 °C) • Wind: ENE 9 mph (14 km/h) • Weather: Clear
- Game attendance: 81,799
- Referee: Matt Loeffler
- TV announcers (ESPN): Steve Levy (Play-by-Play), Brian Griese (Color), Todd McShay (Sideline)

Game information

First quarter

- 07:13 AUB FG – Daniel Carlson, 24 yard field goal

Second quarter

- 14:17 AUB FG – Carlson, 28 yard field goal
- 00:48 CLEM TD – Kelly Bryant 3 yard run, (Greg Huegel PAT)

Third quarter

- 11:48 CLEM TD – Bryant 27 yard run, (Huegel PAT)

Top passers

- CLEM – Kelly Bryant; 19–29, 181 yards
- AUB – Jarrett Stidham; 13–24, 79 yards

Top rushers

- CLEM – Kelly Bryant; 19 carries, 59 yards, 2 TDs
- AUB – Kamryn Pettway; 22 carries, 75 yards

Top Receiving

- CLEM – Hunter Renfrow; 9 catches, 62 yards
- AUB – Ryan Davis; 8 catches, 32 yards

=== At Louisville ===
Clemson Tigers at Louisville Cardinals− Game summary

Quarter	1	2	3	4	Total
No. 3 Clemson	7	12	14	14	47
No. 14 Louisville	7	0	0	14	21

at Papa John's Cardinal Stadium • Louisville, KY

- Date: September 16, 2017
- Game time: 8:12 p.m.
- Game weather: Temperature: 81 °F (27 °C) • Wind: ESE 5 mph (8.0 km/h) • Weather: Partly Cloudy
- Game attendance: 55,588
- Referee: Jeff Flanagan
- TV announcers (ABC): Chris Fowler (Play-by-Play), Kirk Herbstreit (Color), Maria Taylor (Sideline)

Game information

First quarter

- 09:45 CLEM TD – Kelly Bryant 8 yard run, (Greg Huegel PAT)
- 04:22 LOU TD – Lamar Jackson 11 yard pass to Charles Standberry, (Blanton Creque PAT)

Second quarter

- 06:57 CLEM FG – Huegel, 31 yard field goal
- 06:57 CLEM TD – Bryant 79 yard pass to Ray-Ray McCloud, (Huegel PAT)
- 00:28 CLEM FG – Huegel, 49 yard field goal

Third quarter

- 08:57 CLEM TD – Dorian O'Daniel 44 yard interception return, (Huegel PAT)
- 02:16 CLEM TD – Bryant 1 yard run, (Huegel PAT)

Fourth quarter

- 13:45 LOU TD – Jackson 36 yard pass to Jaylen Smith, (Creque PAT)
- 11:56 CLEM TD – Adam Choice 39 yard run, (Huegel PAT)
- 07:37 LOU TD – Jackson 8 yard pass to Desmond Fitzpatrick, (Creque PAT)
- 06:13 CLEM TD – Travis Etienne 81 yard run, (Huegel PAT)

Top passers

- CLEM – Kelly Bryant; 22–32, 316 yards, 1 TD
- UL – Lamar Jackson; 21–42, 317 yards, 3 TD, 1 INT

Top rushers

- CLEM – Travis Etienne; 6 carries, 98 yards, 1 TD
- UL – Lamar Jackson; 17 carries, 88 yards

Top Receiving

- CLEM – Ray-Ray McCloud; 7 receptions, 115 yards, 1 TD
- UL – Jaylen Smith; 5 receptions, 79 yards, 1 TD

=== Boston College ===
Boston College Eagles at Clemson Tigers − Game summary

Quarter	1	2	3	4	Total
Boston College	0	0	7	0	7
No. 2 Clemson	0	7	0	27	34

at Memorial Stadium • Clemson, SC

- Date: September 23, 2017
- Game time: 3:30 ET
- Game weather: Temperature: 88 °F (31 °C) • Wind: SE 8 mph (13 km/h) • Weather: Mostly Sunny
- Game attendance: 80,525
- Referee: Riley Johnson
- TV announcers (ESPN2): Dave LaMont (Play-by-play), Kelly Stouffer (color), Kris Budden (sideline)

Game information

First quarter

- None

Second quarter

- 07:16 CLEM TD – Kelly Bryant 11 yard run, (Alex Spence PAT)

Third quarter

- 03:30 BC TD – A. J. Dillon 1 yard run, (Colton Lichtenberg PAT)

Fourth quarter

- 11:59 CLEM TD – Adam Choice 6 yard run, (Spence PAT)
- 05:41 CLEM TD – Travis Etienne 50 yard run, (Spence PAT)
- 02:50 CLEM TD – Bryant 4 yard run, (Spence PAT failed)
- 00:50 CLEM TD – Etienne 10 yard run, (Spence PAT)

Top passers

- CLEM – Kelly Bryant; 17–26, 140 yards
- BC – Anthony Brown; 14–30, 133 yards, 1 INT

Top rushers

- CLEM – Travis Etienne; 9 rushes, 113 yards, 2 TD
- BC – A. J. Dillon; 13 rushes, 57 yards, 1 TD

Top Receiving

- CLEM – Hunter Renfrow; 6 catches, 53 yards
- BC – Jeff Smith; 4 catches, 58 yards

=== At Virginia Tech ===
Clemson Tigers at Virginia Tech Hokies − Game summary

Quarter	1	2	3	4	Total
No. 2 Clemson	10	7	7	7	31
No. 12 Virginia Tech	0	3	0	14	17

at Lane Stadium • Blacksburg, VA

- Date: September 30, 2017
- Game time: 8:21 p.m.
- Game weather: Temperature: 61 °F (16 °C) • Wind: ENE 10 mph (16 km/h) • Weather: Clear
- Game attendance: 65,632
- Referee: Jeff Heaser
- TV announcers (ABC): Chris Fowler (play-by-play), Kirk Herbstreit (color), Maria Taylor and Tom Rinaldi (Sideline)

Game information

First quarter

- 09:54 CLEM FG – Alex Spence, 23 yard field goal
- 06:48 CLEM TD – Kelly Bryant 60 yard pass to Tavien Feaster, (Spence PAT)

Second quarter

- 03:10 VT FG – Joey Slye 43, yard field goal
- 01:19 CLEM TD – C. J. Fuller 1 yard run, (Spence PAT)

Third quarter

- 07:12 CLEM TD – Feaster 1 yard run, (Spence PAT)

Fourth quarter

- 14:00 VT TD – Sean Savoy 2 yard run, (Slye PAT)
- 11:08 CLEM TD – Dorian O'Daniel 22 yard interception return, (Spence PAT)
- 01:32 VT TD – Josh Jackson 30 yard pass to Savoy, (Slye PAT)

Top passers

- CLEM – Kelly Bryant; 12–21, 186 yards, 1 TD
- VT – Josh Jackson; 29–44, 251 yards, 1 TD, 2 INT

Top rushers

- CLEM – Kelly Bryant; 19 carries, 94 yards
- VT – Coleman Fox; 5 carries, 39 yards

Top Receiving

- CLEM – Tavien Feaster; 2 receptions, 63 yards, 1 TD
- VT – Cam Phillips; 7 receptions, 74 yards

=== Wake Forest ===
Wake Forest Deamon Deacons at Clemson Tigers − Game summary

Quarter	1	2	3	4	Total
Wake Forest	0	0	0	14	14
No. 2 Clemson	14	0	7	7	28

at Memorial Stadium • Clemson, SC

- Date: October 7, 2017
- Game time: Noon
- Game weather: Temperature: 80 °F (27 °C) • Wind: E 3 mph (4.8 km/h) • Weather: Mostly Cloudy
- Game attendance: 80,567
- Referee: Stuart Mullins
- TV announcers (ESPN2): Beth Mowins (Play-by-Play), Anthony Becht (Color), Rocky Boiman (Sideline)

Game information

First quarter

- 12:59 CLEM TD – Kelly Bryant 28 yard pass to Deon Cain, (Alex Spence PAT)
- 06:18 CLEM TD – Adam Choice 4 yard run, (Spence PAT)

Second quarter

- None

Third quarter

- 07:31 CLEM TD – Travis Etienne 1 yard run, (Spence PAT)

Fourth quarter

- 11:48 CLEM TD – Hunter Johnson 13 yard pass to Cannon Smith, (Spence PAT)
- 08:32 WAKE TD – Kendall Hinton 16 yard pass to Scotty Washington, (Mike Weaver PAT)
- 02:28 WAKE TD – Hinton 11 yard pass to Cam Serigne, (Weaver PAT)

Top passers

- CLEM – Kelly Bryant; 21–29, 200 yards, 1 TD, 1 INT
- WAKE – Kendall Hinton; 14–30, 203 yards, 2 TD

Top rushers

- CLEM – Travis Etienne; 15 carries, 69 yards, 1 TD
- WAKE – Kendall Hinton; 24 carries, 92 yards

Top Receiving

- CLEM – Hunter Renfrow; 6 catches, 61 yards
- WAKE – Greg Dortch; 5 catches, 78 yards

=== At Syracuse ===
Clemson Tigers at Syracuse Orange − Game summary

Quarter	1	2	3	4	Total
No. 2 Clemson	7	7	10	0	24
Syracuse	14	3	7	3	27

at Carrier Dome • Syracuse, NY

- Date: October 13, 2017
- Game time: 7:00 p.m.
- Game weather: Temperature: N/A (Indoors) • Wind: N/A (Indoors) • Weather: N/A (Indoors)
- Game attendance: 42,475
- Referee: Jerry Magallanes
- TV announcers (ESPN2): Dave LaMont (play-by-play), Mack Brown (color), Jen Lada (sideline)

Game information

First quarter

- 11:44 CUSE TD – Eric Dungey 23 yard pass to Dontae Strickland (Cole Murphy PAT)
- 10:37 CLEM TD – Tavien Fester 37 yard run (Alex Spence PAT)
- 5:13 CUSE TD – Dungey 66 yard pass to Ervin Phillips (Murphy PAT)

Second quarter

- 8:31 CLEM TD – Tanner Muse 63 yard fumble return (Spence PAT)
- 3:49 CUSE FG – Cole Murphy 21 yard field goal

Third quarter

- 8:27 CLEM FG – Alex Spence 30 yard field goal
- 7:12 CUSE TD – Dungey 30 yard pass to Steve Ishmael (Murphy PAT)
- 6:16 CLEM TD – Travis Etinne 52 yard run (Spence PAT)

Fourth quarter

- 9:41 CUSE FG – Cole Murphy 30 yard field goal

Top passers

- CLEM – Kelly Bryant; 12–17, 116 yards, 0 TD
- CUSE – Eric Dungey; 20–32, 278 yards, 3 TD

Top rushers

- CLEM – Travis Etinne; 5 carries, 68 yards, 1 TD
- CUSE – Donate Strickland; 19 carries, 78 yards, 0 TD

Top Receiving

- CLEM – Hunter Renfrow; 5 catches, 64 yards
- CUSE – Ervin Phillips; 4 catches, 94 yards

=== Georgia Tech ===
Georgia Tech Yellow Jackets at Clemson Tigers − Game summary

Quarter	1	2	3	4	Total
Georgia Tech	3	0	0	7	10
No. 7 Clemson	14	7	3	0	24

at Memorial Stadium • Clemson, SC

- Date: October 28, 2017
- Game time: 8:12 p.m.
- Game weather: Temperature: 56 °F (13 °C) • Wind: NNW 6 mph (9.7 km/h) • Weather: Heavy rain
- Game attendance: 80,346
- Referee: Jeff Maconaghy
- TV announcers (ABC/ESPN2): Chris Fowler (Play-by-Play), Kirk Herbstreit (Color), Maria Taylor (Sideline)

Game information

First quarter

- 12:51 CLEM TD: Kelly Bryant 38 yard pass to Deon Cain, (Alex Spence PAT)
- 04:53 GT FG: Brenton King 25 yard field goal
- 01:56 CLEM TD: Bryant 20 yard pass to Milan Richard, (Spence PAT)

Second quarter

- 03:26 CLEM TD: Travis Etienne 2 yard run, (Spence PAT)

Third quarter

- 10:32 CLEM FG: Spence 29 yard field goal

Fourth quarter

- 04:43 GT TD: TaQuon Marshall 22 yard run, (King PAT)

Top passers

- CLEM – Kelly Bryant; 22–33, 207 yards, 2 TD
- GT – TaQuon Marshall; 3–13, 32 yards

Top rushers

- CLEM – Kelly Bryant; 12 carries, 67 yards
- GT – KirVonte Benson; 16 carries, 129 yards

Top Receiving

- CLEM – Deon Cain; 4 receptions, 57 yards, 1 TD
- GT – Ricky Jeune; 2 receptions, 17 yards

=== At North Carolina State ===
Clemson Tigers at North Carolina State Wolfpack − Game summary

Quarter	1	2	3	4	Total
No. 4 Clemson	7	10	14	7	38
No 20. North Carolina State	14	7	0	10	31

at Carter–Finley Stadium • Raleigh, NC

- Date: November 4, 2017
- Game time: 3:30 p.m.
- Game weather: Temperature: 61 °F (16 °C) • Wind: S 7 mph (11 km/h) • Weather: Overcast
- Game attendance: 57,600
- Referee: Riley Johnson
- TV announcers (ABC): Joe Tessitore (Play-by-Play), Todd Blackledge (Color), Holly Rowe (Sideline)

Game information

First quarter

- 13:09 NCST TD – Ryan Finley 40 yard pass to Kelvin Harmon, (Carson Wise PAT)
- 08:59 CLEM TD – Ray-Ray McCloud 77 yard punt return, (Alex Spence PAT)
- 02:25 NCST TD – Jaylen Samuels 1 yard run, (Wise PAT)

Second quarter

- 14:04 CLEM TD – Kelly Bryant 10 yard run, (Spence PAT)
- 09:29 NCST TD – Finley 7 yard pass to Samuels, (Wise PAT)
- 05:15 CLEM FG – Spence 26 yard field goal

Third quarter

- 03:31 CLEM TD – Bryant 12 yard pass to Deon Cain, (Spence PAT)
- 00:00 CLEM TD – Tavien Feaster 89 yard run, (Spence PAT)

Fourth quarter

- 12:23 NCST TD – Finley 15 yard pass to Jakobi Meyers (Kyle Bambard PAT)
- 06:31 CLEM TD – Bryant 1 yard run, (Spence PAT)
- 01:51 NCST FG – Bambard 22 yard field goal

Top passers

- CLEM – Kelly Bryant; 20–38, 191 yards, 1 TD
- NCST – Ryan Finley; 31–50, 338 yards, 3 TD, 2 INT

Top rushers

- CLEM – Tavien Feaster; 7 carries, 105 yards, 1 TD
- NCST – Reggie Gallaspy; 6 carries, 46 yards

Top Receiving

- CLEM – Deon Cain; 9 receptions, 84 yards, 1 TD
- NCST – Kelvin Harmon; 8 receptions, 155 yards, 1 TD

=== Florida State ===
Florida State Seminoles at Clemson Tigers − Game summary

Quarter	1	2	3	4	Total
Florida State	0	0	7	7	14
No. 4 Clemson	7	10	0	14	31

at Memorial Stadium • Clemson, SC

- Date: November 11, 2017
- Game time: 3:36 p.m.
- Game weather: Temperature: 48 °F (9 °C) • Wind: ENE 10 mph (16 km/h) • Weather: Mostly Sunny
- Game attendance: 81,436
- Referee: Jeff Flanagan
- TV announcers (ABC): Steve Levy (Play-by-Play), Brian Griese (Color), Todd McShay (Sideline)

Game information

First quarter

- 02:51 CLEM TD – Kelly Bryant 2 yard run, (Alex Spence PAT)

Second quarter

- 06:34 CLEM TD – Travis Etienne 28 yard run, (Spence PAT)
- 01:39 CLEM FG – Spence 26 yard field goal

Third quarter

- 01:13 FSU TD – Jacques Patrick 3 yard run, (Ricky Aguayo PAT)

Fourth quarter

- 08:53 FSU TD – James Blackman 60 yard pass to Ryan Izzo, (Aguayo PAT)
- 03:05 CLEM TD – Etienne 1 yard run, (Spence PAT)
- 00:35 CLEM TD – Adam Choice 10 yard run, (Spence PAT)

Top passers

- CLEM – Kelly Bryant; 20–30, 151 yards
- FSU – James Blackman; 13–32, 208 yards, 1 TD, 1 INT

Top rushers

- CLEM – Travis Etienne; 14 carries, 98 yards, 2 TD
- FSU – Cam Akers; 12 carries, 40 yards

Top Receiving

- CLEM – Hunter Renfrow; 4 receptions, 35 yards
- FSU – Nyqwan Murray; 4 receptions, 73 yards

=== The Citadel ===
Citadel Bulldogs at Clemson Tigers − Game summary

Quarter	1	2	3	4	Total
The Citadel	0	0	0	3	3
No. 4 Clemson	21	17	20	3	61

at Memorial Stadium • Clemson, SC

- Date: November 18, 2017
- Game time: 12:20 p.m.
- Game weather: Temperature: 62 °F (17 °C) • Wind: SSW 5 mph (8.0 km/h) • Weather: Cloudy
- Game attendance: 80,618
- Referee: Stuart Mullins
- TV announcers (ACCN): Tom Werme (Play-by-Play), David Archer (Color), D. J. Shockley (Sideline)

Game information

First quarter

- 08:13 CLEM TD – Kelly Bryant 53 yard pass to Deon Cain, (Alex Spence PAT)
- 05:38 CLEM TD – Travis Etienne 6 yard run, (Spence PAT)
- 00:51 CLEM TD – Bryant 12 yard pass to Hunter Renfrow, (Spence PAT)

Second quarter

- 11:59 CLEM TD – Bryant 13 yard pass to T. J. Chase, (Spence PAT)
- 06:32 CLEM FG – Spence 26 yard field goal
- 00:05 CLEM TD – Zerrick Cooper 32 yard pass to Tee Higgins, (Christian Groomes PAT)

Third quarter

- 14:38 CLEM TD – Tavien Feaster 61 yard run, (Groomes PAT)
- 09:11 CLEM TD – Travis Etienne 7 yard run, (Groomes PAT)
- 03:50 CLEM TD – Hunter Johnson 78 yard pass to Higgins, (Drew Costa failed PAT)

Fourth quarter

- 06:09 CLEM FG – Groomes 38 yard field goal
- 02:50 CIT FG – Jacob Godek 30 yard field goal

Top passers

- CLEM – Kelly Bryant; 17–22, 230 yards, 3 TD
- CIT – Jordan Black; 1–4, 61 yards

Top rushers

- CLEM – Tavien Feaster; 4 carries, 69 yards, 1 TD
- CIT – Grant Drakeford; 7 carries, 46 yards

Top Receiving

- CLEM – Tee Higgins; 6 receptions, 178 yards, 2 TD
- CIT – Raliegh Webb; 1 reception, 61 yards

=== At South Carolina ===
Clemson Tigers at South Carolina Gamecocks − Game summary

Quarter	1	2	3	4	Total
No. 4 Clemson	7	13	14	0	34
South Carolina	0	0	0	10	10

at Williams-Brice Stadium • Columbia, SC

- Date: November 25, 2017
- Game time: 7:30 p.m.
- Game weather: Temperature: 57 °F (14 °C) • Wind: WSW 3 mph (4.8 km/h) • Weather: Partly Cloudy
- Game attendance: 82,908
- Referee: Jeff Heaser
- TV announcers (ESPN): Joe Tessitore (Play-by-Play), Todd Blackledge (Color), Holly Rowe (Sideline)

Game information

First quarter

- 06:50 CLEM TD – Ryan Carter 12 yard interception return, (Alex Spence PAT)

Second quarter

- 08:12 CLEM TD – Tavien Feaster 1 yard run, (Spence PAT)
- 01:58 CLEM TD – Kelly Bryant 4 yard pass to Hunter Renfrow, (Spence PAT)

Third quarter

- 14:39 CLEM TD – Bryant 61 yard pass to H. Renfrow, (Spence PAT)
- 02:47 CLEM TD – Travis Etienne 5 yard run, (Spence PAT)

Fourth quarter

- 13:21 USC FG – Parker White 40 yard field goal
- 02:45 USC TD – Jake Bentley 38 yard pass to Bryan Edwards, (White PAT)

Top passers

- CLEM – Kelly Bryant; 23–24, 272 yards, 2 TD, 1 INT
- USC – Jake Bentley; 16–29, 126 yards, 1 TD, 2 INT

Top rushers

- CLEM – Travis Etienne; 9 carries, 41 yards, 1 TD
- USC – Ty'Son Williams; 13 carries, 53 yards

Top Receiving

- CLEM – Tee Higgins; 3 catches, 84 yards
- USC – Bryan Edwards; 6 catches, 70 yards, 1 TD

=== vs Miami (FL) – ACC Championship Game ===
Clemson Tigers vs Miami Hurricanes − Game summary

Quarter	1	2	3	4	Total
No. 1 Clemson	14	7	17	0	38
No. 7 Miami (FL)	0	0	0	3	3

at Bank of America Stadium • Charlotte, NC

- Date: December 2, 2017
- Game time: 8:00 p.m.
- Game weather: Temperature: 53 °F (12 °C) • Wind: NE 3 mph (4.8 km/h) • Weather: Cloudy
- Game attendance: 74,372
- Referee: Jeff Flanagan
- TV announcers (ABC): Chris Fowler (Play-by-Play), Kirk Herbstreit (Color), Maria Taylor (Sideline)

Game information

First quarter

- 10:36 CLEM TD – Travis Etienne 4-yard run (Alex Spence PAT)
- 03:02 CLEM TD – Kelly Bryant 11-yard run (Spence PAT)

Second quarter

- 12:49 CLEM TD – Adam Choice 1-yard run (Spence PAT)

Third quarter

- 10:14 CLEM FG – Spence 46-yard field goal
- 03:17 CLEM TD – Tavien Feaster 11-yard run (Spence PAT)
- 01:01 CLEM TD – Bryant 27-yard pass to Deon Cain (Spence PAT)

Fourth quarter

- 03:29 MIA FG – Michael Badgley 22-yard field goal

Top passers

- CLEM – Kelly Bryant; 23–29, 252 yards, 1 TD, 0 INT
- MIA – Malik Rosier; 14–29, 110 yards, 0 TD, 2 INT

Top rushers

- CLEM – Travis Etienne; 6 carries, 24 yards, 1 TD
- MIA – DeeJay Dallas; 6 44 yards

Top Receiving

- CLEM – Ray-Ray McCloud; 6 catches, 100 yards
- MIA – Braxton Berrios; 7 catches, 51 yards

== CFP Playoff ==
=== Alabama – Sugar Bowl ===
Clemson Tigers vs Alabama Crimson Tide − Game summary

Quarter	1	2	3	4	Total
No. 4 Alabama	10	0	14	0	24
No. 1 Clemson	0	3	3	0	6

at Mercedes-Benz Superdome • New Orleans, LA

- Date: January 1, 2018
- Game time: 9:01 p.m.
- Game weather: Temperature: 71 °F (22 °C) • Wind: N/A – indoors • Weather: N/A – indoors
- Game attendance: 72,360
- Referee: Land Clark
- TV announcers (ESPN): Joe Tessitore, (Play-By-Play) Todd Blackledge (Color), Holly Rowe (Sideline) and Laura Rutledge (Sideline)

Game information

First quarter

- 05:32 ALA FG – Andy Pappanastos 24 Yd Field Goal
- 00:12 ALA TD – Jalen Hurts 12-yard pass to Calvin Ridley, (Pappanastos PAT)

Second quarter

- 10:00 CLEM FG – Alex Spence 44 yard Field Goal

Third quarter

- 12:45 CLEM FG – Spence 42 yard Field Goal
- 5:40 ALA TD – Hurts 1-yard pass to Daron Payne, (Pappanastos PAT)
- 5:27 ALA TD – Mack Wilson 18-yard interception return, (Pappanastos PAT)

Fourth quarter

- none

Top passers

- CLEM – Kelly Bryant; 18–36, 124 yards, 2 INT
- ALA – Jalen Hurts; 16–24, 120 yards, 2 TDs

Top rushers

- CLEM – Travis Etienne; 4 carries, 22 yards
- ALA – Damien Harris; 19 carries, 77 yards

Top Receiving

- CLEM – Deon Cain; 6 receptions, 75 yards
- ALA – Calvin Ridley; 4 receptions, 39 yards, 1 TD

== Personnel ==
=== Coaching staff ===
Head coach Dabo Swinney added one new addition to the Tigers' coaching staff in January 2017, Todd Bates who was the defensive line coach at Jacksonville State University was hired after losing Dan Brooks to retirement and Marion Hobby signing with the Jacksonville Jaguars. Mickey Conn was promoted from defensive analyst to co-defensive back coach.

Name	Position	CU Years	Alma mater
Dabo Swinney	Head Coach	15th	Alabama (1993)
Danny Pearman	Assistant Head Coach / special teams coordinator / tight ends coach	10th	Clemson (1987)
Brent Venables	Defensive Coordinator / linebackers coach	6th	Kansas State (1992)
Todd Bates	Defensive Line Coach	1st	Alabama (2004)
Jeff Scott	Co-offensive Coordinator / wide receivers coach	10th	Clemson (2003)
Tony Elliott	Co-offensive Coordinator / running backs Coach	7th	Clemson (2002)
Robbie Caldwell	Offensive Linemen Coach	7th	Furman (1977)
Mike Reed	Defensive backs coach	5th	Boston College (1994)
Brandon Streeter	Recruiting coordinator / quarterbacks Coach	4th	Clemson (1999)
Joey Batson	Director of strength and conditioning	21st	Newberry College (1981)
Mickey Conn	Co-defensive backs coach	2nd	Alabama (1995)
Kyle Richardson	Offensive Analyst	2nd	Appalachian State (2001)
Zac Alley	Graduate assistant	7th	Clemson (2014)

=== Roster ===
2017 Clemson Tigers Football
Quarterback: 2 Kelly Bryant – junior (6'3, 222); 6 Zerrick Cooper – (redshirt) freshman (6'2, 219); 7 Chase Brice – freshman (6'3, 213); 10 Tucker Israel – (redshirt) sophomore (5'10, 180); 15 Hunter Johnson – freshman (6'4, 210); 18 James Barnes – (redshirt) sophomore (6'1, 175); Running back: 9 Travis Etienne Jr. – freshman (5'11, 197); 21 Darien Rencher – (redshirt) freshman (5'8, 195); 26 Adam Choice – (redshirt) junior (5'9, 210); 27 C.J. Fuller – (redshirt) junior (5'10, 209); 28 Tavien Feaster – sophomore (5'11, 222); Wide receiver: 1 Trevion Thompson – (redshirt) junior (6'2, 198); 3 Amari Rodgers – freshman (5'10, 212); 5 Tee Higgins – freshman (6'4, 197); 8 Deon Cain – junior (6'1, 192); 13 Hunter Renfrow – (redshirt) junior (5'11, 181) (+P); 14 Diondre Overton – sophomore (6'5, 209); 16 Will Swinney – freshman (5'9, 181); 17 Cornell Powell – sophomore (6'0, 202); 18 T.J. Chase – (redshirt) freshman (6'1, 185); 20 Jack Swinney – (redshirt) senior (5'8, 160); 34 Ray-Ray McCloud – junior (5'10, 184); 35 Ty Thomason – (redshirt) sophomore (5'11, 221); 37 Ryan Mac Lain – (redshirt) sophomore (5'8, 175); 81 Kanyon Tuttle – (redshirt) sophomore (5'10, 169); 82 Will Brown – freshman (5'9, 186); 83 Carter Groomes – (redshirt) freshman (5'8, 184); 85 Seth Ryan – (redshirt) senior (6'0, 175); 88 Jayson Hopper – (redshirt) freshman (6'1, 216); Tight end: 11 Shadell Bell – (redshirt) sophomore (6'1, 230); 25 J.C. Chalk – (redshirt) freshman (6'2, 249); 44 Garrett Williams – junior (6'3, 245); 80 Milan Richard – (redshirt) junior (6'3, 256); 83 Jesse Fisher – (redshirt) sophomore (6'4, 215); 84 Cannon Smith – (redshirt) junior (6'5, 269); 87 D.J. Greenlee – (redshirt) senior (6'1, 246); Placekicker: 39 Christian Groomes – (redshirt) junior (5'10, 199) (+P); 47 Alex Spence – (redshirt) junior (6'1, 190); 92 Greg Huegel – (redshirt) junior (5'11, 193)	Offensive lineman: 50 Justin Falcinelli – OL – (redshirt) junior (6'4, 304); 51 Taylor Hearn – OL – (redshirt) junior (6'5, 321); 55 Tyrone Crowder – OG – (redshirt) senior (6'2, 338); 59 Gage Cervenka – OL – (redshirt) sophomore (6'3, 322); 60 Kelby Bevelle – OL – (redshirt) senior (6'2, 275); 62 Cade Stewart – OL – (redshirt) freshman (6'3, 299); 64 Pat Godfrey – OL – (redshirt) sophomore (6'2, 285); 65 Matt Bockhorst – OG – freshman (6'5, 306); 68 Noah DeHond – OT – freshman (6'7, 303); 69 Maverick Morris – OG – (redshirt) senior (6'4, 298); 70 Seth Penner – OG – (redshirt) sophomore (6'3, 299); 71 Noah Green – OL – (redshirt) sophomore (6'5, 285); 72 Blake Vinson – OT – freshman (6'5, 293); 72 Logan Tisch – OL – (redshirt) sophomore (6'2, 290); 73 Tremayne Anchrum – OL – (redshirt) freshman (6'2, 288); 74 John Simpson – OL – sophomore (6'4, 311); 75 Mitch Hyatt – OT – junior (6'5, 302); 76 Sean Pollard – OL – (redshirt) freshman (6'5, 307); 77 Zach Giella – C – (redshirt) sophomore(6'5, 301); 78 Chandler Reeves – OL – (redshirt) freshman (6'7, 286); 79 Matthew Ryan – C – (redshirt) freshman (6'2, 320); Defensive lineman: 7 Austin Bryant – DE – junior (6'4, 266); 22 Xavier Kelly – DE – (redshirt) freshman (6'4, 264); 42 Christian Wilkins – DT – junior (6'4, 297); 44 Nyles Pinckney – DT – (redshirt) freshman (6'1, 298); 45 Chris Register – DE – (redshirt) junior (6'3, 253); 49 Richard Yeargin – DE – (redshirt) junior (6'5, 260); 50 Jabril Robinson – DT – (redshirt) junior (6'2, 273); 59 Jordan Williams – DE – freshman (6'5, 280); 61 Kaleb Bevelle – DE – (redshirt) senior (6'3, 271); 67 Albert Huggins – DT – junior (6'3, 299); 90 Dexter Lawrence – DT – sophomore (6'5, 337); 93 Sterling Johnson – DE – (redshirt) sophomore (6'4, 295); 94 Jacob Edwards – DE – freshman (6'3, 266); 95 James Edwards – DE – freshman (6'3, 262); 99 Clelin Ferrell – DE – (redshirt) sophomore (6'5, 265); Punter: 48 Will Spiers – (redshirt) freshman (6'5, 228); 96 Michael Batson – (redshirt) sophomore (5'10, 208); 97 Carson King – (redshirt) sophomore (6'0, 226)	Linebacker: 5 Shaq Smith – (redshirt) freshman (6'2, 244); 6 Dorian O'Daniel – (redshirt) senior (6'1, 224); 10 Baylon Spector – freshman (6'1, 224); 30 Jalen Williams – junior (5'10, 212); 33 J.D. Davis – junior (6'2, 226); 34 Kendall Joseph – (redshirt) junior (6'0, 229); 35 Justin Foster – LB – freshman (6'4, 255); 36 Judah Davis – junior (6'1, 238); 43 Chad Smith – (redshirt) sophomore (6'4, 239); 46 Jarvis Magwood – (redshirt) junior (5'11, 220); 47 James Skalski – sophomore (6'0, 237); 52 Connor Prevost – (redshirt) senior (6'0, 220); 53 Regan Upshaw – (redshirt) freshman (5'11, 232); 54 Logan Rudolph – freshman (6'3, 228); 56 Luke Price – freshman (6'2, 221); 57 Tre Lamar – sophomore (6'3, 250); 59 Connor Sekas – (redshirt) junior (6'2, 229); Defensive back: 1 Trayvon Mullen – CB – sophomore (6'2, 191); 2 Mark Fields – CB – junior (5'10, 178); 8 A. J. Terrell – CB – freshman (6'2, 188); 9 Brian Dawkins Jr. – CB – (redshirt) freshman (5'7, 166); 11 Isaiah Simmons – S – (redshirt) freshman (6'3, 223); 12 K'Von Wallace – DB – sophomore (6'0, 196); 14 Denzel Johnson – CB – (redshirt) sophomore (6'0, 202); 19 Tanner Muse – S – (redshirt) sophomore (6'2, 220); 20 LeAnthony Williams Jr. – CB – freshman (6'0, 177); 23 Van Smith – S – junior (5'11, 191); 24 Nolan Turner – S – (redshirt) freshman (6'1, 205); 29 Marcus Edmond – CB – (redshirt) senior (6'0, 183); 31 Ryan Carter – CB – (redshirt) senior (5'9, 184); 32 Kyle Cote – S – (redshirt) sophomore (5'10, 185); 37 Austin Jackson – S – (redshirt) sophomore (6'2, 202); 37 Cameron Scott – S – (redshirt) junior (5'10, 208); 38 Amir Trapp – CB – (redshirt) sophomore (5'8, 176); 40 Hall Morton – S – (redshirt) freshman (5'8, 182); Long snappers: 52 Austin Spence – (redshirt) sophomore (6'2, 206); 58 Patrick Phibbs – (redshirt) sophomore (6'2, 221); 59 Bradley Tatko – (redshirt) senior (6'0, 225); 71 Jack Maddox – freshman (6'4, 210)

=== Recruiting class ===
College recruiting (2017)
Name	Hometown	School	Height	Weight	Commit date
Hunter Johnson; QB-DT	Brownsburg, Indiana	Brownsburg HS	6 ft 2 in (1.88 m)	201 lb (91 kg)	Dec 14, 2015
Hunter Johnson; QB-DT	Recruit ratings: Scout: Rivals: 247Sports: ESPN:				
Amari Rodgers; WR	Knoxville, Tennessee	Knoxville Catholic HS	5 ft 10 in (1.78 m)	221 lb (100 kg)	Feb 14, 2016
Amari Rodgers; WR	Recruit ratings: Scout: Rivals: 247Sports: ESPN:				
Tee Higgins; WR	Oak Ridge, Tennessee	Oak Ridge HS	6 ft 5 in (1.96 m)	188 lb (85 kg)	Jul 4, 2016
Tee Higgins; WR	Recruit ratings: Scout: Rivals: 247Sports: ESPN:				
Noah DeHond; OT	Hightstown, New Jersey	The Peddle School	6 ft 7 in (2.01 m)	320 lb (150 kg)	Aug 7, 2015
Noah DeHond; OT	Recruit ratings: Scout: Rivals: 247Sports: ESPN:				
Matt Bockhorst; OG	Cincinnati, Ohio	St.Xavier HS	6 ft 5 in (1.96 m)	297 lb (135 kg)	Jan 30, 2016
Matt Bockhorst; OG	Recruit ratings: Scout: Rivals: 247Sports: ESPN:				
Jordan Williams; DE	Virginia Beach, Virginia	Frank W. Cox HS	6 ft 5 in (1.96 m)	260 lb (120 kg)	Aug 6, 2016
Jordan Williams; DE	Recruit ratings: Scout: Rivals: 247Sports: ESPN:				
Justin Foster; DE	Shelby, North Carolina	Crest HS	6 ft 4 in (1.93 m)	250 lb (110 kg)	Oct 10, 2016
Justin Foster; DE	Recruit ratings: Scout: Rivals: 247Sports: ESPN:				
Logan Rudolph; LB	Rock Hill, South Carolina	Northwestern HS	6 ft 3 in (1.91 m)	228 lb (103 kg)	May 6, 2016
Logan Rudolph; LB	Recruit ratings: Scout: Rivals: 247Sports: ESPN:				
Baylon Spector; S	Calhoun, Georgia	Calhoun HS	6 ft 2 in (1.88 m)	205 lb (93 kg)	Aug 15, 2015
Baylon Spector; S	Recruit ratings: Scout: Rivals: 247Sports: ESPN:				
Chase Brice; QB-PP	Loganville, Georgia	Grayson HS	6 ft 2 in (1.88 m)	207 lb (94 kg)	Dec 16, 2015
Chase Brice; QB-PP	Recruit ratings: Scout: Rivals: 247Sports: ESPN:				
Travis Etienne; RB	Jennings, Louisiana	Jennings HS	5 ft 11 in (1.80 m)	210 lb (95 kg)	Jan 26, 2017
Travis Etienne; RB	Recruit ratings: Scout: Rivals: 247Sports: ESPN:				
LeAnthony Williams Jr. CB	Roswell, Georgia	Roswell HS	6 ft 0 in (1.83 m)	170 lb (77 kg)	Feb 22, 2016
LeAnthony Williams Jr. CB	Recruit ratings: Scout: Rivals: 247Sports: ESPN:				
A. J. Terrell; CB	Atlanta, Georgia	Westlake HS	6 ft 2 in (1.88 m)	180 lb (82 kg)	Aug 19, 2016
A. J. Terrell; CB	Recruit ratings: Scout: Rivals: 247Sports: ESPN:				
Blake Vinson; OT	Citra, Florida	North Marion HS	6 ft 6 in (1.98 m)	295 lb (134 kg)	Jan 31, 2016
Blake Vinson; OT	Recruit ratings: Scout: Rivals: 247Sports: ESPN:				
Will Swinney; WR	Central, South Carolina	D W Daniel HS	5 ft 9 in (1.75 m)	170 lb (77 kg)	January 12, 2017 – Walk-On
Will Swinney; WR	Recruit ratings: 247Sports: ESPN:				
Overall recruit ranking: Scout: 26 Rivals: 22 247Sports: 13 ESPN: 8
‡ Refers to 40-yard dash; Note: In many cases, Scout, Rivals, 247Sports, On3, and ESPN may conflict in their listings of height, weight and 40 time.; In these cases, the average was taken. ESPN grades are on a 100-point scale.; Sources: "Clemson Football Commitments". Rivals.; "2017 Team Ranking". Rivals.com.

=== Transfers ===
Clemson lost six players due to transfer, running back Tyshon Dye, Offensive linemen Jake Fruhmorgen, cornerback Adrian Baker, defensive tackle Scott Pagano, Safety Korrin Wiggins and Defensive end LaSamuel Davis all announced they would transfer from the program.

Name	Number	Pos.	Height	Weight	Year	Hometown	College transferred to
Jake Fruhmorgen	63	OL	6'5"	290	Junior	Tampa, Florida	Florida
Tyshon Dye	22	RB	5'11"	220	(redshirt) Senior	Elberton, Georgia	East Carolina
Adrian Baker	21	CB	5'11"	180	(redshirt) Senior	Hallandale, Florida	Oklahoma State
Scott Pagano	56	DT	6'3"	295	(redshirt) Senior	Honolulu, Hawaii	Oregon
Korrin Wiggins	15	S	6'0"	200	(redshirt) Senior	Durham, North Carolina	East Carolina
LaSamuel Davis	7	DE	6'4"	205	(redshirt) Freshman	Bamberg, South Carolina	SC State

== Awards and honors ==
=== Individual awards ===
- Broyles Award – Tony Elliot

=== All Americans ===
- Clelin Ferrell – AP 1st team, FWAA 2nd team
- Mitch Hyatt – AP 2nd team, FWAA 2nd team, Walter Camp 2nd team
- Christian Wilkins – AP 2nd team, Walter Camp 2nd team
- Dorian O'Daniel – AP 2nd team
- Tyrone Crowder – AP 3rd team
- Austin Bryant – AP 3rd team, FWAA 1st team, Walter Camp 2nd team

=== All-ACC Teams ===
1st Team

Mitch Hyatt, Tackle
Justin Falcinelli, Center
Tyrone Crowder, Guard
Clelin Ferrell, Defensive End
Christian Wilkins, Defensive tackle
Dexter Lawrence, Defensive tackle

2nd Team

Austin Bryant, Defensive End
Dorian O'Daniel, Linebacker

3rd Team

Travis Etienne, Running Back
Hunter Renfrow, Wide Receiver
Deon Cain, Wide Receiver
Taylor Hearn, Guard
Kendall Joseph, Linebacker

== 2018 NFL draft ==
Player	Team	Round	Pick #	Position
Dorian O'Daniel	Kansas City Chiefs	3rd	100	LB
Deon Cain	Indianapolis Colts	6th	185	WR
Ray-Ray McCloud	Buffalo Bills	6th	187	WR

=== Undrafted free agents ===
Player	Team	Position	Ref
Ryan Carter	Buffalo Bills	CB	
Marcus Edmund	Los Angeles Chargers	CB	
Van Smith	Atlanta Falcons	Safety	
Taylor Hearn	Carolina Panthers	Offensive line	
