= 2018 Sugar Bowl =

College Football Playoff Semifinal bowl game

2018 Allstate Sugar Bowl
- College Football Playoff Semifinal; 84th Sugar Bowl
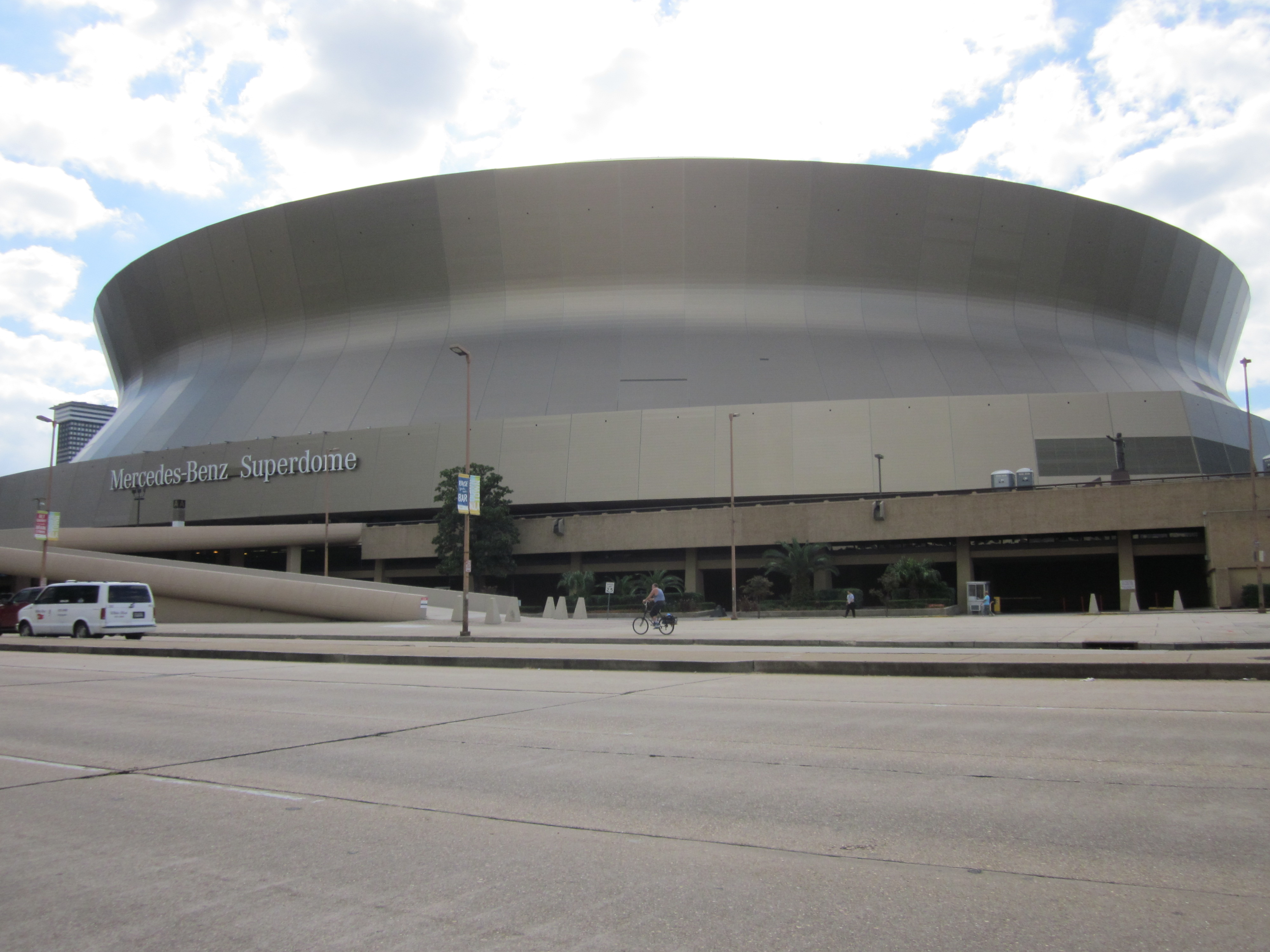
- The Mercedes-Benz Superdome in New Orleans, Louisiana, hosted the Sugar Bowl.
Alabama Crimson Tide	Clemson Tigers
(11–1)	(12–1)
SEC	ACC
24	6
Head coach: Nick Saban	Head coach: Dabo Swinney
AP / Coaches / CFP; 4 / 4 / 4	AP / Coaches / CFP; 1 / 1 / 1
	1	2	3	4	Total
Alabama	10	0	14	0	24
Clemson	0	3	3	0	6
- Date: January 1, 2018
- Season: 2017
- Stadium: Mercedes-Benz Superdome
- Location: New Orleans, Louisiana, US
- MVP: Jalen Hurts, QB (Offensive); Daron Payne, DT (Defensive)
- Favorite: Alabama by 3½
- Referee: Land Clark (Pac-12)
- Halftime show: Million Dollar Band (Alabama); Clemson Tiger Marching Band (Clemson)
- Attendance: 72,360

United States TV coverage
- Network: ESPN, ESPN Deportes
- Announcers: Joe Tessitore, Todd Blackledge, Holly Rowe, and Laura Rutledge (ESPN); Bill Rosinski, David Norrie and Ian Fitzsimmons (ESPN Radio)
- Nielsen ratings: 11.5 (21.6 million viewers)

The 2018 Sugar Bowl (officially known as the College Football Playoff Semifinal at the 2018 Allstate Sugar Bowl for sponsorship reasons) was a college football bowl game played on January 1, 2018, at the Mercedes-Benz Superdome in New Orleans, Louisiana. The game was the 84th playing of the Sugar Bowl, and it was the first semifinal of the 2017–18 College Football Playoff (CFP), part of the slate of bowl games which concluded the 2017 FBS football season. The game featured two of the four teams chosen by the CFP selection committee: the No. 1 Clemson Tigers from the Atlantic Coast Conference (ACC) and the No. 4 Alabama Crimson Tide from the Southeastern Conference (SEC). The winner qualified for the 2018 College Football Playoff National Championship against the winner of the other semifinal, hosted at the Rose Bowl.

The contest was televised on ESPN and ESPN Deportes, with a radio broadcast on ESPN Radio and XM Satellite Radio, with kickoff at 8:00 p.m. CT (9:00 p.m. ET).

== Teams ==
The #1-ranked Clemson Tigers, champions of the Atlantic Coast Conference, faced the #4-ranked Alabama Crimson Tide, co-champions of the SEC West Division (along with Auburn who won head-to-head over Alabama.) This was the third consecutive year in which Clemson and Alabama met in the CFPs, though the previous two meetings were in the CFP Championship Game.

== See also ==
- Alabama–Clemson football rivalry

== Notes ==
- January 1, 2018 – The Rose Bowl in Pasadena hosted the other semi-final game.

This was Alabama's first Sugar Bowl win of the Nick Saban era. This was also their first win in a Sugar bowl since 1993 against Miami. The Tide had lost games in the 2008–2009, 2013–2014, and 2014–2015 football/bowl seasons. This was also the first win for the Southeastern Conference in the Sugar Bowl since 2010 (Ole Miss has to vacate a win over Oklahoma State), including losses to Louisville, Oklahoma (twice) and Ohio State (twice).

== Game summary ==
The Crimson Tide immediately took a 10–3 lead at halftime. Alex Spence was the only player to score for the Clemson Tigers with just two field goals. Alabama's defense was a huge factor in the game holding the Tigers to only six points. This matchup was a rematch of the 2017 College Football Playoff National Championship in which the Tigers won with quarterback Deshaun Watson leading the team as the game's MVP. The Tigers were not able to perform without Watson and with Kelly Bryant.

=== Scoring summary ===
College Football Playoff Semifinal at the 2018 Allstate Sugar Bowl

Quarter	1	2	3	4	Total
No. 4 Alabama	10	0	14	0	24
No. 1 Clemson	0	3	3	0	6

at Mercedes-Benz Superdome • New Orleans, Louisiana

- Date: January 1, 2018
- Game time: 8:00 p.m. CST
- Game weather: n/a (indoor stadium)
- Game attendance: 72,360
- Referee: Land Clark (Pac-12)
- TV announcers (ESPN): Joe Tessitore (play-by-play), Todd Blackledge (analyst), Holly Rowe, and Laura Rutledge (sidelines)
- Box score

Scoring summary

Quarter	Time	Drive			Team	Scoring information	Score	
Quarter	Time	Plays	Yards	TOP	Team	Scoring information	Alabama	Clemson
1	5:23	10	47	5:24	Alabama	24-yard field goal by Andy Pappanastos	3	0
1	0:12	8	46	3:34	Alabama	Calvin Ridley 12-yard touchdown reception from Jalen Hurts, Andy Pappanastos kick good	10	0
2	10:00	13	54	5:03	Clemson	44-yard field goal by Alex Spence	10	3
3	12:45	4	5	2:03	Clemson	42-yard field goal by Alex Spence	10	6
3	5:40	7	27	3:38	Alabama	Daron Payne 1-yard touchdown reception from Jalen Hurts, Andy Pappanastos kick good	17	6
3	5:27				Alabama	Interception returned 18 yards for touchdown by Mack Wilson, Andy Pappanastos kick good	24	6
"TOP" = time of possession. For other American football terms, see Glossary of American football.							24	6

== Statistics ==
Team statistical comparison
Statistic	Alabama	Clemson
First downs	16	14
First downs rushing	9	6
First downs passing	5	8
First downs penalty	2	0
Third down efficiency	8–17	8–19
Fourth down efficiency	1–1	1–2
Total plays–net yards	66–261	70–188
Rushing attempts–net yards	42–141	33–64
Yards per rush	3.4	1.9
Yards passing	120	124
Pass completions–attempts	16–24	18–37
Interceptions thrown	0	2
Punt returns–total yards	3–30	0–0
Kickoff returns–total yards	3–48	4–65
Punts–average yardage	6–35.5	7–39.3
Fumbles–lost	1–1	0–0
Penalties–yards	2–10	4–29
Time of possession	32:11	27:49

Alabama statistics
Crimson Tide passing
	C–A	Yds	TD–INT
Jalen Hurts	16–24	120	2–0
Crimson Tide rushing
	Car	Yds	TD
Damien Harris	19	77	0
Jalen Hurts	11	40	0
Bo Scarbrough	12	24	0
Crimson Tide receiving
	Rec	Yds	TD
Calvin Ridley	4	39	1
Henry Ruggs	2	25	0
Najee Harris	1	22	0
Bo Scarbrough	2	16	0
Irv Smith Jr.	1	6	0
Damien Harris	2	4	0
Hootie Jones	1	4	0
Josh Jacobs	2	3	0
Da'Ron Payne	1	1	1

Clemson statistics
Tigers passing
	C–A	Yds	TD–INT
Kelly Bryant	18–36	124	0–2
Tavien Feaster	0–1	0	0–0
Tigers rushing
	Car	Yds	TD
Travis Etienne	4	22	0
Kelly Bryant	19	19	0
Adam Choice	5	14	0
Tavien Feaster	4	10	0
TEAM	1	−1	0
Tigers receiving
	Rec	Yds	TD
Deon Cain	6	75	0
Hunter Renfrow	5	31	0
Amari Rodgers	1	16	0
Milan Richard	1	4	0
Ray-Ray McCloud	3	1	0
Tavien Feaster	2	−3	0
