= 2017 Boston College Eagles football team =

American college football season

2017 Boston College Eagles football

Pinstripe Bowl, L 20–27 vs. Iowa
- Conference: Atlantic Coast Conference
- Atlantic Division
- Record: 7–6 (4–4 ACC)
- Head coach: Steve Addazio (5th season)
- Offensive coordinator: Scot Loeffler (2nd season)
- Offensive scheme: Multiple
- Defensive coordinator: Jim Reid (3rd season)
- Base defense: 4–3
- Captains: Jon Baker; Charlie Callinan; Kamrin Moore
- Home stadium: Alumni Stadium

Uniform
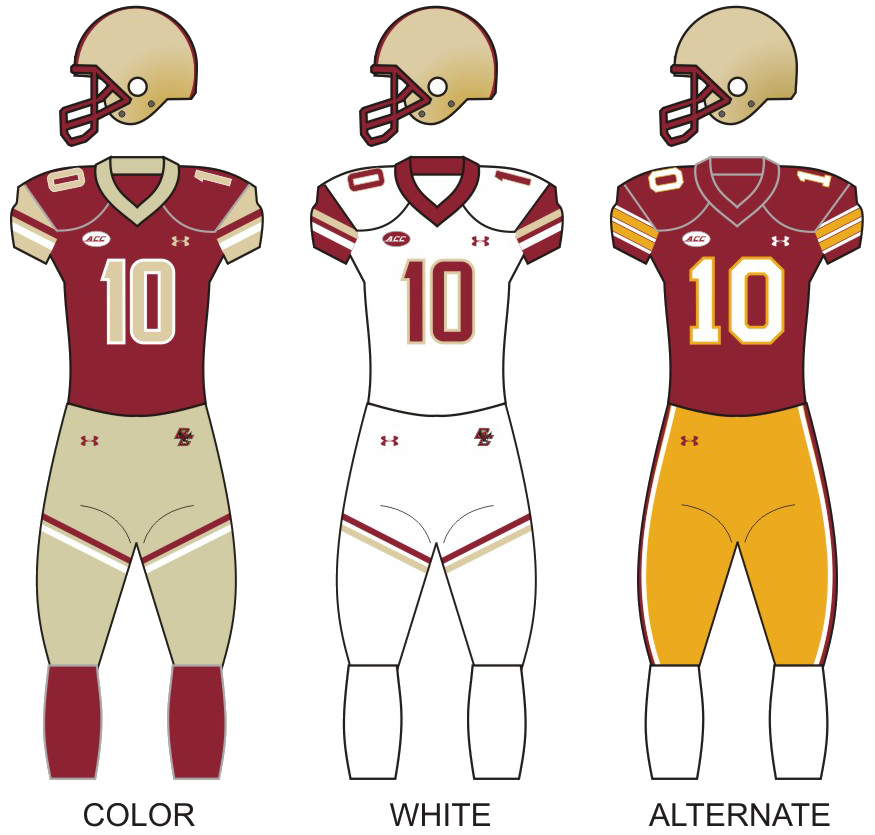

2017 Atlantic Coast Conference football standings
	Conf.			Overall
Team	W		L	W		L
Atlantic Division
No. 4 Clemson xy$^	7	–	1	12	–	2
No. 23 NC State	6	–	2	9	–	4
Wake Forest	4	–	4	8	–	5
Louisville	4	–	4	8	–	5
Boston College	4	–	4	7	–	6
Florida State	3	–	5	7	–	6
Syracuse	2	–	6	4	–	8
Coastal Division
No. 13 Miami (FL) xy	7	–	1	10	–	3
No. 24 Virginia Tech	5	–	3	9	–	4
Georgia Tech	4	–	4	5	–	6
Virginia	3	–	5	6	–	7
Pittsburgh	3	–	5	5	–	7
Duke	3	–	5	7	–	6
North Carolina	1	–	7	3	–	9
Championship: Clemson 38, Miami 3
^ – College Football Playoff participant; $ – Conference champion; x – Division champion/co-champions; y – Championship game participant; Rankings from AP Poll

The 2017 Boston College Eagles football team represented Boston College during the 2017 NCAA Division I FBS football season. The Eagles played their home games at Alumni Stadium in Chestnut Hill, Massachusetts, and competed in the Atlantic Division of the Atlantic Coast Conference (ACC). They were led by fifth-year head coach Steve Addazio. They finished the season 7–6 overall and 4–4 in ACC play to place in a three-way tie for third in the Atlantic Division. They were invited to the Pinstripe Bowl, where they lost to Iowa.

== Schedule ==
Boston College announced its 2017 football schedule on January 24, 2017. The 2017 schedule consisted of 6 home, 5 away and 1 neutral site game in the regular season. The Eagles hosted ACC foes Florida State, NC State, Virginia Tech, and Wake Forest, and traveled to Clemson, Louisville, Syracuse, and Virginia.

The Eagles hosted two of the four non-conference opponents, Central Michigan from the Mid-American Conference (MAC), Notre Dame, an independent, and traveled to Northern Illinois who is also from the MAC. Boston College met UConn from the American Athletic Conference at Fenway Park in late November.

Date	Time	Opponent	Site	TV	Result	Attendance
September 1	9:30 p.m.	at Northern Illinois*	Huskie Stadium; DeKalb, IL	CBSSN	W 23–20	16,421
September 9	1:00 p.m.	Wake Forest	Alumni Stadium; Chestnut Hill, MA	ACCN Extra	L 10–34	38,082
September 16	3:30 p.m.	Notre Dame*	Alumni Stadium; Chestnut Hill, MA (Holy War)	ESPN	L 20–49	44,500
September 23	3:30 p.m.	at No. 2 Clemson	Memorial Stadium; Clemson, SC (O'Rourke–McFadden Trophy)	ESPN2	L 7–34	80,525
September 30	1:00 p.m.	Central Michigan*	Alumni Stadium; Chestnut Hill, MA	ESPN app	W 28–8	27,036
October 7	7:15 p.m.	No. 16 Virginia Tech^{†}	Alumni Stadium; Chestnut Hill, MA (rivalry)	ESPN2	L 10–23	32,057
October 14	12:20 p.m.	at Louisville	Papa John's Cardinal Stadium; Louisville, KY	ACCN	W 45–42	44,679
October 21	12:30 p.m.	at Virginia	Scott Stadium; Charlottesville, VA	ESPN app	W 41–10	39,216
October 27	8:00 p.m.	Florida State	Alumni Stadium; Chestnut Hill, MA	ESPN	W 35–3	40,629
November 11	12:00 p.m.	NC State	Alumni Stadium; Chestnut Hill, MA	ABC/ESPN2	L 14–17	33,242
November 18	7:00 p.m.	vs. UConn*	Fenway Park; Boston, MA	CBSSN	W 39–16	20,133
November 25	12:20 p.m.	at Syracuse	Carrier Dome; Syracuse, NY	ACCN	W 42–14	30,202
December 27	5:15 p.m.	vs. Iowa*	Yankee Stadium; Bronx, NY (Pinstripe Bowl)	ESPN	L 20–27	37,667
*Non-conference game; ^{†}Homecoming; Rankings from AP Poll released prior to the game; All times are in Eastern time

== Game summaries ==
=== At Northern Illinois ===
	1	2	3	4	Total
Eagles	3	10	7	3	23
Huskies	3	7	7	3	20

=== Wake Forest ===
	1	2	3	4	Total
Demon Deacons	7	14	10	3	34
Eagles	0	7	3	0	10

=== Notre Dame ===
	1	2	3	4	Total
Fighting Irish	7	7	14	21	49
Eagles	3	7	3	7	20

=== At Clemson ===
	1	2	3	4	Total
Eagles	0	0	7	0	7
Tigers	0	7	0	27	34

=== Central Michigan ===
	1	2	3	4	Total
Chippewas	2	6	0	0	8
Eagles	14	7	7	0	28

=== Virginia Tech ===
	1	2	3	4	Total
Hokies	7	10	3	3	23
Eagles	3	0	0	7	10

=== At Louisville ===
	1	2	3	4	Total
Eagles	7	7	14	17	45
Cardinals	14	7	0	21	42

=== At Virginia ===
	1	2	3	4	Total
Eagles	17	7	10	7	41
Cavaliers	0	7	0	3	10

=== Florida State ===
	1	2	3	4	Total
Seminoles	0	3	0	0	3
Eagles	7	14	14	0	35

=== NC State ===
	1	2	3	4	Total
Wolfpack	0	10	0	7	17
Eagles	0	7	7	0	14

=== vs UConn ===
	1	2	3	4	Total
Huskies	3	0	0	13	16
Eagles	0	14	19	6	39

=== At Syracuse ===
	1	2	3	4	Total
Eagles	14	14	7	7	42
Orange	7	7	0	0	14

=== vs Iowa–Pinstripe Bowl ===
	1	2	3	4	Total
Hawkeyes	3	7	7	10	27
Eagles	7	10	0	3	20

== 2018 NFL draft ==
Player	Team	Round	Pick #	Position
Harold Landry	Tennessee Titans	2nd	41	LB
Isaac Yiadom	Denver Broncos	3rd	99	CB
Kamrin Moore	New Orleans Saints	6th	189	CB
