= Ryan Carter (American football) =

American football player and coach (born 1994)

San Francisco 49ers
- Title: Scouting assistant

Personal information
- Born: November 4, 1994 (age 32); Loganville, Georgia
- Listed height: 5 ft 9 in (1.75 m)
- Listed weight: 180 lb (82 kg)

Career information
- High school: Grayson (Loganville, Georgia)
- College: Clemson (2013–2017)
- NFL draft: 2018: undrafted

Career history

Playing
- Buffalo Bills (2018)*; Montreal Alouettes (2019–2021)
- * Offseason or practice squad member only

Coaching
- Oklahoma Sooners (2022–2023) Defensive graduate assistant

Operations
- San Francisco 49ers (2024–present) Scouting Assistant

Awards and highlights
- CFP national champion (2016)
- Stats at Pro Football Reference

Ryan Carter (born November 4, 1994) is an American football coach and former cornerback, who is currently a defensive graduate assistant on the Oklahoma Sooners coaching staff. He played college football for the Clemson Tigers, including as a starting cornerback on the Tigers’ 2016 national championship team. In 2018, he signed with the Buffalo Bills of the National Football League as an undrafted free agent out of college. From 2019–2021, he played cornerback for the Montreal Alouettes of the Canadian Football League (CFL). In 2022, he joined his former Clemson defensive coordinator and current Oklahoma head football coach Brent Venables' inaugural Sooners coaching staff as a defensive graduate assistant.

== Early life ==
Carter attended and played football at Grayson High School in Loganville, Georgia. In high school, Carter was a two-way player, playing wide receiver on offense as well as safety and cornerback on defense.

As a junior, he caught 10 passes for 266 receiving yards, including three touchdowns, during Grayson's 15-0 state championship season.

As a senior, he accumulated 1,112 receiving yards and 10 touchdowns on 49 receptions as Grayson went 10-2 and earned the #5 high school team ranking in Georgia.

As a college recruit, Carter was the #31 nationally ranked cornerback and the #61 player overall in Georgia, per ESPN. He committed to play college football for Clemson, along with high school teammate and current NFL running back Wayne Gallman, over scholarship offers from Mississippi, Tulane, Southern Miss, East Carolina, and Arkansas State.

Carter played high school football for Grayson head coach Mickey Conn, who was a college teammate and roommate with Dabo Swinney at Alabama. In 2016, Conn left Grayson to join Swinney's coaching staff as a defensive assistant coach, also reuniting with Carter, at Clemson.

== College career ==
=== 2014 season ===
After redshirting his 2013 freshman season at Clemson, Carter made his collegiate debut as a redshirt freshman on September 6, 2014, against South Carolina State, logging one tackle. He played in 12 games, accruing three total tackles (two solo, one assisted), that season as Clemson earned a 10-3 record and defeated the Oklahoma Sooners in the 2014 Russell Athletic Bowl at the Orlando Citrus Bowl in Orlando, Florida.

=== 2015 season ===
In 2015, as a redshirt sophomore, Carter played in 14 games, starting two, mostly at nickelback for the Tigers, and registered 23 tackles, two pass breakups, one tackle for loss, and one fumble recovery. He defended in coverage on 168 of 247 total defensive snaps, allowing 15 receptions on 30 targets.

On December 5, 2015, he made his first collegiate start, at cornerback, in the ACC Championship Game against the North Carolina Tarheels, recording four tackles, including three solo tackles, and helping Clemson to a 45–37 win and a berth in the College Football Playoff. On December 31, 2015, making his second career start, he made three tackles in Clemson's 37–17 win over the Oklahoma Sooners in the Orange Bowl College Football Playoff semifinal game.

=== 2016 season ===
As a redshirt junior, Carter earned a starting role, splitting time between nickelback and cornerback. On September 22, 2016, Carter recorded his first career sack against Georgia Tech. On November 5, 2016, he recorded his first career interception in Clemson's 54–0 win over Syracuse.

Carter started at cornerback for Clemson in the 2016 ACC Championship Game against Virginia Tech, where he recorded four tackles (two solo) and one pass defended en route to Clemson's 42–35 win, ACC Championship title, and berth in the 2016 College Football Playoff. In the College Football Playoff semifinal game, the 2016 Fiesta Bowl, against Ohio State, he recorded one solo tackle in Clemson's 31-0 blowout win that clinched a berth in the national championship game. The following week, in the 2017 College Football Playoff National Championship Game against Alabama, Carter started at cornerback and recorded one solo tackle to help Clemson to a 35–31 win and become the 2017 college football national champions.

He played 400 of 649 total defensive snaps in coverage, allowing only 26 receptions on 57 targets and a 51.1 passer rating allowed. His 2016 season performance earned him Clemson's defensive Iron Man Award.

=== 2017 season ===
Carter's Clemson teammates voted him team captain as a senior. He continued in his starting cornerback role on Clemson's defense.

On November 4, 2017, against North Carolina State, Carter recorded his first interception of the season, along with three pass breakups, four tackles, and one tackle for loss. In the final regular season game versus in-state rival South Carolina, he intercepted a pass and returned it for a touchdown for Clemson's first score of the game, in addition to registering three solo tackles and one pass defended in Clemson's 34–10 win. A week later, in the ACC Championship Game, he intercepted Miami Hurricane quarterback, Malik Rosier, in the third quarter of Clemson's blowout 38–3 victory over Miami.

Carter finished his senior campaign with 14 games started at cornerback, 33 tackles (28 solo, two tackles for loss), 10 passes defended (tied for 10th-most in the ACC), three interceptions (tied for 11th-most in the ACC), one forced fumble, and one touchdown (INT return). Playing over 500 snaps at cornerback and over 100 snaps at nickelback, he dropped into coverage on 383 of 698 total defensive snaps, allowing only 25 receptions on 55 targets with a 40.5 passer rating allowed as a senior. His season performance earned him All-ACC Honorable Mention honors.

Carter finished his Clemson college career with 81 tackles (62 solo), 8.5 tackles for loss, 19 passes defended, four interceptions, one forced fumble, one fumble recovery, one sack, and one touchdown. After entering college as a two-star recruit out of high school, Carter played in 55 games in his college career, the third-most games played in Clemson program history.

=== College statistics ===
Year	Team	G	GS	Solo	Ast	Tot	TFL	INT	PD	Sack	FF	FR	TD
2014	CLEM	12	0	2	1	3	0	0	0	0	0	0	0
2015	CLEM	14	2	12	3	15	1.0	0	0	0	0	1	0
2016	CLEM	15	13	20	10	30	5.5	1	7	1	0	0	0
2017	CLEM	14	14	28	5	33	2.0	3	10	0	1	0	1
Total		55	29	62	19	81	8.5	4	17	1	1	1	1

== Professional career ==
Pre-draft measurables
Height	Weight	Arm length	Hand span	Wingspan	40-yard dash	10-yard split	20-yard split	20-yard shuttle	Three-cone drill	Vertical jump	Broad jump	Bench press
5 ft 9 3/8 in (1.76 m)	184 lb (83 kg)	29 5/8 in (0.75 m)	8 3/4 in (0.22 m)	5 ft 10 1/2 in (1.79 m)	4.52 s	1.63 s	2.66 s	4.37 s	7.00 s	32.5 in (0.83 m)	9 ft 11 in (3.02 m)	16 reps
All values from Pro Day

=== Buffalo Bills ===
On March 15, 2018, at his Clemson pro day, Carter ran a 4.52-second 40-yard dash and completed 16 225-lb bench press reps. On May 11, Carter signed with the Buffalo Bills of the National Football League (NFL) as an undrafted free agent. He played in all four of Buffalo's preseason games, recording two solo tackles. On September 1, Buffalo waived Carter at the end of the preseason as a part of the team's final roster cuts.

=== Montreal Alouettes ===
On January 28, 2019, Carter signed with the Montreal Alouettes of the Canadian Football League (CFL). During Montreal's 2019 season, he started 14 games at cornerback before suffering a hamstring injury against the Calgary Stampeders on October 5, which resulted in him being placed on the injured reserve list and ended his season.

Carter and the Alouettes did not play in 2020 after the 2020 CFL season was cancelled due to the COVID-19 pandemic.

Shortly after Carter had become a free agent, the Alouettes announced on February 23, 2021, that the team had signed Carter to a new deal for the 2021 season. In early July, he suffered a torn Achilles tendon in the beginning of training camp, which resulted in him being placed on the injured reserve list on July 11 and ended his season.

=== Professional statistics ===
Year	Team	League	G	GS	Tot	INT	PD	Sack	FF	FR	TD
2019	MTL	CFL	14	14	22	0	2	0	0	0	0
2020*	MTL	CFL	-	-	-	-	-	-	-	-	-
2021**	MTL	CFL	0	0	0	0	0	0	0	0	0
Total			14	14	22	0	2	0	0	0	0

*The 2020 CFL season was cancelled due to the COVID-19 pandemic.

**After suffering a torn Achilles tendon in July 2021, Carter spent the 2021 CFL season on the Montreal Alouettes’ injured reserve list.

== Coaching career ==
In 2022, Carter joined Oklahoma Sooners head coach Brent Venables' inaugural coaching staff as a defensive graduate assistant. Venables, formerly the defensive coordinator at Clemson, coached Carter during his collegiate playing career with the Tigers.

On June 3, 2026, the San Francisco 49ers promoted Carter from the role of scouting assistant to NFS scout.

== Personal life ==
Carter majored in sociology at Clemson.
