= Hunter Johnson (American football) =

American football player (born 1998)

Profile
- Position: Quarterback

Personal information
- Born: March 18, 1998 (age 28); Brownsburg, Indiana, U.S.
- Listed height: 6 ft 2 in (1.88 m)
- Listed weight: 210 lb (95 kg)

Career information
- High school: Brownsburg (IN)
- College: Clemson (2017); Northwestern (2018–2021); Clemson (2022)
- NFL draft: 2023: undrafted

Awards and highlights
- Pete Dawkins Trophy (2017)

Hunter Johnson (born March 18, 1998) is an American former college football quarterback who played for the Clemson Tigers and Northwestern Wildcats. Rated as a five-star recruit coming out of high school, Johnson was considered as one of the top quarterback recruits in the 2017 class.

== Early life ==
Johnson attended Brownsburg High School in Brownsburg, Indiana. During his career he passed for 6,657 yards and 69 touchdowns, including 2,233 yards and 25 touchdowns as a senior. Johnson was a four-year starter on the varsity football team, playing in the state's largest class (6A). He led his team to a Hoosier Crossroads Conference championship as a senior and was awarded the team's MVP. Johnson was named team captain his junior and senior years. He holds multiple school records including: Most touchdown passes completed in a game (6), season (31), most passing yards in a game (452) and in a career (6657). Johnson received IFCA and AP all-state honors as a junior and a senior, and was the #1 ranked player in the state of Indiana throughout high school. He was an Indiana Griddy Award Winner. Johnson was also an all-state track runner while at Brownsburg HS, running the 200, 400, and the 4×400 meter relay. He is part of the school's record-holding 4×400 team with a time of 3:17.81. In December 2016, Johnson was named Indy Star's Mr. Football.

=== Recruiting ===
Johnson was rated as a five-star recruit and was ranked among the top recruits in the 2017 class. Johnson was ranked by Rivals.com as the number 18 overall player (across every position) in the nation, and was the 2016 Rivals 5-star challenge quarterback MVP. He committed to the Tennessee Volunteers football in 2015 after taking multiple visits there. However, after a visit to Clemson University in December 2015 he flipped his commitment to Dabo Swinney's Clemson Tigers. Johnson is a 2016 Elite 11 quarterback, and as such he was chosen to compete in Nike's The Opening. While there he made the All-Nike Rating Team (top 24 athletes nationally) with a score of 122.04 (only quarterback on the team).

Johnson won the Pete Dawkins Trophy as the MVP of the 2017 US Army All-American Bowl.

== College career ==
=== Clemson ===
Johnson was an early enrollee at Clemson.

Johnson did not redshirt his freshman year at Clemson. He began the season as 3rd string quarterback, but earned the backup position by mid season. Johnson saw limited action against Kent State, Louisville, Wake Forest, Georgia Tech, The Citadel, Miami, and South Carolina. He threw his first collegiate touchdown to tight end Cannon Smith during Clemson's game against Wake Forest. Johnson completed 77.8 percent of his passes, throwing for 234 yards and 2 touchdowns during the 2017 season.

On June 11, 2018, Johnson announced that he would transfer to Northwestern University.

=== Northwestern ===
Johnson sat out the 2018 season and became eligible to play in 2019.

Johnson's first season at Northwestern was described by many as a huge disappointment. Johnson struggled with injuries, bad play and serious family struggles off the field. Johnson completed 46% of his passes, throwing for 432 yards, one touchdown and 4 interceptions.

In Johnson's second season at Northwestern he battled Peyton Ramsey for the starting quarterback position. Johnson lost the battle and served as Ramsey's backup for the whole season. Johnson did not record any stats this season.

In Johnson's third season he battled Ryan Hilinski and Andrew Marty for the starting quarterback position. Johnson was named the starter for Northwestern's first game of the season against Michigan State. Johnson got off to a promising start throwing for nearly 300 yards and three touchdowns. In the second game of the season against Indiana State Johnson struggled, throwing for 66 yards, one touchdown and one interception. In the third game of the season against Duke, Johnson would throw three interceptions in the first half while fumbling once. Johnson was subsequently benched and didn't see the field again that season. Johnson completed 60% of his passes, throwing for 424 yards, four touchdowns and four interceptions.

On January 12, 2022, Johnson entered the transfer portal.

=== Return to Clemson ===
Johnson contacted his former coach Dabo Swinney about a possible graduate assistant position at Clemson. Swinney invited him to return as a quarterback. Johnson is the first Clemson player to ever be added via the NCAA transfer portal under Swinney.

=== College statistics ===
Year	Team	Passing							Rushing			
Year	Team	Cmp	Att	Pct	Yds	TD	Int	Rate	Att	Yds	Avg	TD
2017	Clemson	21	27	77.8	234	2	1	167.6	2	-4	-2.0	0
2019	Northwestern	50	108	46.3	432	1	4	75.5	48	64	1.3	1
2021	Northwestern	45	75	60.0	424	4	4	114.4	24	-22	-0.9	0
2022	Clemson	6	6	100.0	10	0	0	114.0	0	0	0.0	0
Total		122	216	56.5	1100	7	9	101.6	74	38	0.5	1

== Professional career ==
Pre-draft measurables
Height	Weight	Arm length	Hand span	40-yard dash	10-yard split	20-yard split	20-yard shuttle	Three-cone drill	Vertical jump	Broad jump
6 ft 2 5/8 in (1.90 m)	199 lb (90 kg)	31 1/2 in (0.80 m)	9 7/8 in (0.25 m)	4.71 s	1.63 s	2.73 s	4.44 s	7.06 s	35.5 in (0.90 m)	10 ft 3 in (3.12 m)
All values from Pro Day
