= 2017 ACC Championship Game =

2017 Dr Pepper ACC Championship Game
- Conference Championship
Miami Hurricanes	Clemson Tigers
(10–1)	(11–1)
3	38
Head coach: Mark Richt	Head coach: Dabo Swinney
AP / Coaches / CFP; 7 / 7 / 7	AP / Coaches / CFP; 1 / 1 / 1
	1	2	3	4	Total
Miami	0	0	0	3	3
Clemson	14	7	17	0	38
- Date: December 2, 2017
- Season: 2017
- Stadium: Bank of America Stadium
- Location: Charlotte, NC
- MVP: Kelly Bryant (QB, Clemson)
- Favorite: Clemson by 12
- Referee: Jeff Flanagan
- Attendance: 74,372

United States TV coverage
- Network: ABC/ESPN Radio
- Announcers: Chris Fowler, Kirk Herbstreit, Maria Taylor, and Tom Rinaldi (ABC); Bill Rosinski and David Norrie (ESPN Radio)

2017 Atlantic Coast Conference football standings
	Conf.			Overall
Team	W		L	W		L
Atlantic Division
No. 4 Clemson xy$^	7	–	1	12	–	2
No. 23 NC State	6	–	2	9	–	4
Wake Forest	4	–	4	8	–	5
Louisville	4	–	4	8	–	5
Boston College	4	–	4	7	–	6
Florida State	3	–	5	7	–	6
Syracuse	2	–	6	4	–	8
Coastal Division
No. 13 Miami (FL) xy	7	–	1	10	–	3
No. 24 Virginia Tech	5	–	3	9	–	4
Georgia Tech	4	–	4	5	–	6
Virginia	3	–	5	6	–	7
Pittsburgh	3	–	5	5	–	7
Duke	3	–	5	7	–	6
North Carolina	1	–	7	3	–	9
Championship: Clemson 38, Miami 3
^ – College Football Playoff participant; $ – Conference champion; x – Division champion/co-champions; y – Championship game participant; Rankings from AP Poll

The 2017 ACC Championship Game was played on December 2, 2017. It was the 13th annual ACC Football Conference Championship Game to determine the 2017 champion of the Atlantic Coast Conference. The game was held at Bank of America Stadium in Charlotte, North Carolina, and featured the Clemson Tigers and the Miami Hurricanes. Clemson won the game, 38-3.

== History ==
The 2017 Championship Game was the 13th in the Atlantic Coast Conference's 65-year history. Last season, the ACC Championship Game featured the Clemson Tigers, champions of the Atlantic Division, and the Virginia Tech Hokies, champions of the Coastal Division. Clemson won the game 42–35, and went on to win the 2016 College Football Playoff National Championship.

=== Site selection ===
The championship game had been hosted in Charlotte, North Carolina from 2010 to 2015, and had been slated to host through at least 2019. However, in response to North Carolina's Public Facilities Privacy & Security Act (HB2), the ACC voted in September 2016 to move the 2016 championship out of North Carolina. Camping World Stadium in Orlando, Florida was chosen as a replacement site for the 2016 game. ACC Commissioner John Swofford delayed the decision on where to hold the 2017 football Championship Game due to the ongoing controversy. On April 19, 2017, the ACC announced that the football championship game and other neutral site conference events would return to Charlotte in 2017.

== Teams ==
=== #7 Miami Hurricanes ===
Miami secured its spot in the game by winning the Coastal Division. This was the first ACC divisional title and first appearance in the ACC Championship Game for the Hurricanes.

=== #1 Clemson Tigers ===
Clemson qualified for the game by winning the Atlantic Division with a 7–1 record. Their only loss was to Syracuse, while the Tigers defeated: Louisville, Boston College, Virginia Tech, Wake Forest, Georgia Tech, NC State, and Florida State. This is the Tiger's third straight appearance in the ACC Championship game.

== Scoring summary ==
Scoring summary

Quarter	Time	Drive			Team	Scoring information	Score	
Quarter	Time	Plays	Yards	TOP	Team	Scoring information	Miami	Clemson
1	10:36	10	68	4:24	Clemson	Travis Etienne 4-yard touchdown run, Alex Spence kick good	0	7
1	3:02	7	71	3:07	Clemson	Kelly Bryant 11-yard touchdown run, Alex Spence kick good	0	14
2	12:49	9	41	3:46	Clemson	Adam Choice 1-yard touchdown run, Alex Spence kick good	0	21
3	10:14	6	16	2:36	Clemson	46-yard field goal by Alex Spence	0	24
3	3:13	6	43	3:13	Clemson	Tavien Feaster 11-yard touchdown run, Alex Spence kick good	0	31
3	1:01	2	13	0:55	Clemson	Deon Cain 27-yard touchdown reception from Kelly Bryant, Alex Spence kick good	0	38
4	3:29	9	54	4:05	Miami	22-yard field goal by Michael Badgley	3	38
"TOP" = time of possession. For other American football terms, see Glossary of American football.							3	38

=== Statistics ===
Statistics	MIA	CU
First downs	10	18
Total yards	214	331
Rushing Yards	104	77
Passing yards	110	254
Passing: Comp–Att–Int	14-29–2	25-34-0
Time of possession	25:54	34:06
