= 2017 Syracuse Orange football team =

American college football season

2017 Syracuse Orange football
- Conference: Atlantic Coast Conference
- Atlantic Division
- Record: 4–8 (2–6 ACC)
- Head coach: Dino Babers (2nd season)
- Co-offensive coordinators: Sean Lewis (2nd season); Mike Lynch (2nd season)
- Offensive scheme: Veer and shoot
- Defensive coordinator: Brian Ward (2nd season)
- Base defense: Multiple
- Home stadium: Carrier Dome

2017 Atlantic Coast Conference football standings
| | Conf. | | | Overall |
| Team | W | | L | W | | L |
|---|---|---|---|---|---|---|
Atlantic Division
| No. 4 Clemson xy$^ | 7 | – | 1 | 12 | – | 2 |
| No. 23 NC State | 6 | – | 2 | 9 | – | 4 |
| Wake Forest | 4 | – | 4 | 8 | – | 5 |
| Louisville | 4 | – | 4 | 8 | – | 5 |
| Boston College | 4 | – | 4 | 7 | – | 6 |
| Florida State | 3 | – | 5 | 7 | – | 6 |
| Syracuse | 2 | – | 6 | 4 | – | 8 |
Coastal Division
| No. 13 Miami (FL) xy | 7 | – | 1 | 10 | – | 3 |
| No. 24 Virginia Tech | 5 | – | 3 | 9 | – | 4 |
| Georgia Tech | 4 | – | 4 | 5 | – | 6 |
| Virginia | 3 | – | 5 | 6 | – | 7 |
| Pittsburgh | 3 | – | 5 | 5 | – | 7 |
| Duke | 3 | – | 5 | 7 | – | 6 |
| North Carolina | 1 | – | 7 | 3 | – | 9 |
Championship: Clemson 38, Miami 3
^ – College Football Playoff participant; $ – Conference champion; x – Division champion/co-champions; y – Championship game participant; Rankings from AP Poll

The 2017 Syracuse Orange football team represented Syracuse University during the 2017 NCAA Division I FBS football season. The Orange were led by second-year head coach Dino Babers and played their home games at the Carrier Dome. They competed as members of the Atlantic Division of the Atlantic Coast Conference, finishing in last place with a final record of 4–8 (2–6 ACC).

== Schedule ==
| Date | Time | Opponent | Site | TV | Result | Attendance |
|---|---|---|---|---|---|---|
| September 1 | 7:00 p.m. | Central Connecticut* | Carrier Dome; Syracuse, New York | ACCN Extra | W 50–7 | 30,273 |
| September 9 | 3:30 p.m. | Middle Tennessee* | Carrier Dome; Syracuse, New York | ACCN Extra | L 23–30 | 29,731 |
| September 16 | 3:30 p.m. | Central Michigan* | Carrier Dome; Syracuse, New York | ACCN Extra | W 41–17 | 33,004 |
| September 23 | 7:00 p.m. | at No. 25 LSU* | Tiger Stadium; Baton Rouge, Louisiana | ESPN2 | L 26–35 | 96,044 |
| September 30 | 12:20 p.m. | at NC State | Carter–Finley Stadium; Raleigh, North Carolina | ACCN | L 25–33 | 56,197 |
| October 7 | 12:30 p.m. | Pittsburgh | Carrier Dome; Syracuse, New York (rivalry) | ACCRSN | W 27–24 | 33,290 |
| October 13 | 7:00 p.m. | No. 2 Clemson | Carrier Dome; Syracuse, New York | ESPN | W 27–24 | 42,475 |
| October 21 | 3:30 p.m. | at No. 8 Miami (FL) | Hard Rock Stadium; Miami Gardens, Florida | ESPN | L 19–27 | 56,158 |
| November 4 | 12:20 p.m. | at Florida State | Doak Campbell Stadium; Tallahassee, Florida | ACCN | L 24–27 | 71,805 |
| November 11 | 3:00 p.m. | Wake Forest | Carrier Dome; Syracuse, New York | ACCRSN | L 43–64 | 38,539 |
| November 18 | 3:30 p.m. | at Louisville | Papa John's Cardinal Stadium; Louisville, Kentucky | ESPNU | L 10–56 | 34,265 |
| November 25 | 12:20 p.m. | Boston College | Carrier Dome; Syracuse, New York (rivalry) | ACCN | L 14–42 | 30,202 |
*Non-conference game; Rankings from AP Poll released prior to the game; All times are in Eastern time

== Game summaries ==
=== Central Connecticut ===
| | 1 | 2 | 3 | 4 | Total |
|---|---|---|---|---|---|
| Blue Devils | 0 | 0 | 7 | 0 | 7 |
| Orange | 21 | 10 | 13 | 6 | 50 |

=== Middle Tennessee ===
| | 1 | 2 | 3 | 4 | Total |
|---|---|---|---|---|---|
| Blue Raiders | 2 | 7 | 7 | 14 | 30 |
| Orange | 3 | 10 | 3 | 7 | 23 |

=== Central Michigan ===
| | 1 | 2 | 3 | 4 | Total |
|---|---|---|---|---|---|
| Chippewas | 10 | 7 | 0 | 0 | 17 |
| Orange | 10 | 14 | 17 | 0 | 41 |

=== At LSU ===
| | 1 | 2 | 3 | 4 | Total |
|---|---|---|---|---|---|
| Orange | 3 | 0 | 16 | 7 | 26 |
| No. 25 Tigers | 7 | 7 | 14 | 7 | 35 |

=== At NC State ===
| | 1 | 2 | 3 | 4 | Total |
|---|---|---|---|---|---|
| Orange | 0 | 7 | 10 | 8 | 25 |
| Wolfpack | 13 | 13 | 0 | 7 | 33 |

=== Pittsburgh ===
| | 1 | 2 | 3 | 4 | Total |
|---|---|---|---|---|---|
| Panthers | 0 | 10 | 3 | 11 | 24 |
| Orange | 3 | 7 | 10 | 7 | 27 |

=== Clemson ===
| | 1 | 2 | 3 | 4 | Total |
|---|---|---|---|---|---|
| No. 2 Tigers | 7 | 7 | 10 | 0 | 24 |
| Orange | 14 | 3 | 7 | 3 | 27 |

=== At Miami (FL) ===
| | 1 | 2 | 3 | 4 | Total |
|---|---|---|---|---|---|
| Orange | 0 | 3 | 10 | 6 | 19 |
| No. 8 Hurricanes | 3 | 10 | 7 | 7 | 27 |

=== At Florida State ===
| | 1 | 2 | 3 | 4 | Total |
|---|---|---|---|---|---|
| Orange | 0 | 14 | 3 | 7 | 24 |
| Seminoles | 7 | 14 | 3 | 3 | 27 |

=== Wake Forest ===
| | 1 | 2 | 3 | 4 | Total |
|---|---|---|---|---|---|
| Demon Deacons | 21 | 3 | 16 | 24 | 64 |
| Orange | 14 | 24 | 5 | 0 | 43 |

=== At Louisville ===
| | 1 | 2 | 3 | 4 | Total |
|---|---|---|---|---|---|
| Orange | 3 | 0 | 0 | 7 | 10 |
| Cardinals | 7 | 28 | 14 | 7 | 56 |

=== Boston College ===
| | 1 | 2 | 3 | 4 | Total |
|---|---|---|---|---|---|
| Eagles | 14 | 14 | 7 | 7 | 42 |
| Orange | 7 | 7 | 0 | 0 | 14 |

== 2018 NFL draft ==
| Player | Team | Round | Pick # | Position |
|---|---|---|---|---|
| Zaire Franklin | Indianapolis Colts | 7th | 235 | LB |
