= 2017 North Carolina Tar Heels football team =

American college football season

2017 North Carolina Tar Heels football
- Conference: Atlantic Coast Conference
- Coastal Division
- Record: 3–9 (1–7 ACC)
- Head coach: Larry Fedora (6th season)
- Co-offensive coordinators: Gunter Brewer (4th season); Chris Kapilovic (3rd season)
- Offensive scheme: Spread
- Defensive coordinator: John Papuchis (1st season)
- Base defense: 4–3
- Captains: Nathan Elliott; Cole Holcomb; Donnie Miles; Bentley Spain; M. J. Stewart
- Home stadium: Kenan Memorial Stadium

Uniform
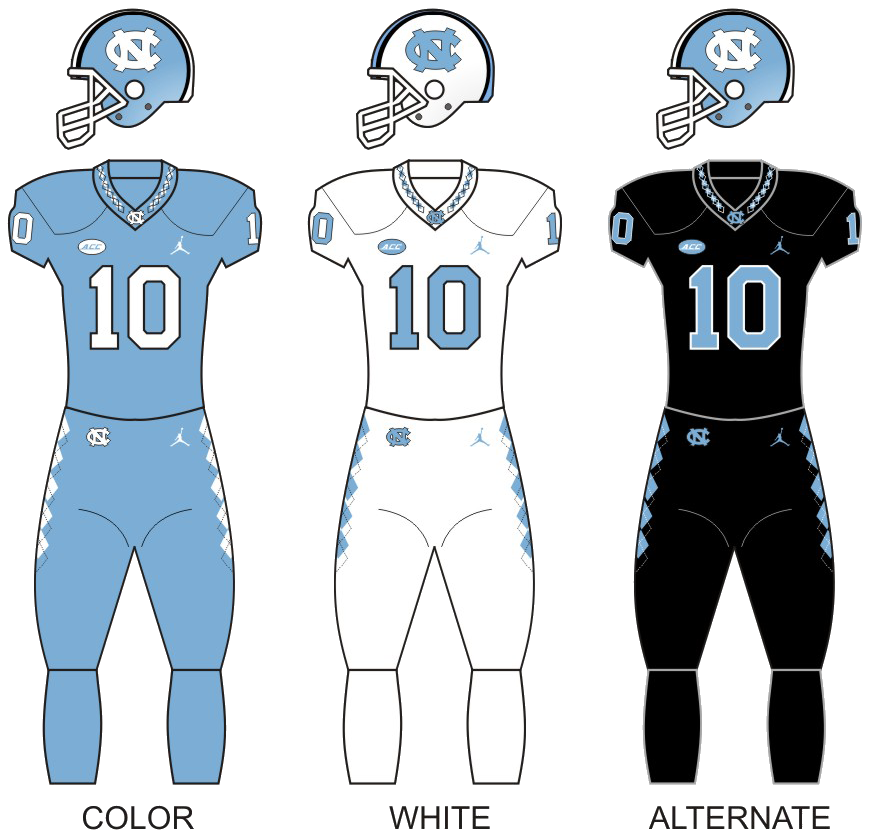

2017 Atlantic Coast Conference football standings
	Conf.			Overall
Team	W		L	W		L
Atlantic Division
No. 4 Clemson xy$^	7	–	1	12	–	2
No. 23 NC State	6	–	2	9	–	4
Wake Forest	4	–	4	8	–	5
Louisville	4	–	4	8	–	5
Boston College	4	–	4	7	–	6
Florida State	3	–	5	7	–	6
Syracuse	2	–	6	4	–	8
Coastal Division
No. 13 Miami (FL) xy	7	–	1	10	–	3
No. 24 Virginia Tech	5	–	3	9	–	4
Georgia Tech	4	–	4	5	–	6
Virginia	3	–	5	6	–	7
Pittsburgh	3	–	5	5	–	7
Duke	3	–	5	7	–	6
North Carolina	1	–	7	3	–	9
Championship: Clemson 38, Miami 3
^ – College Football Playoff participant; $ – Conference champion; x – Division champion/co-champions; y – Championship game participant; Rankings from AP Poll

The 2017 North Carolina Tar Heels football team represented the University of North Carolina at Chapel Hill as a member of Coastal Division of the Atlantic Coast Conference (ACC) during the 2017 NCAA Division I FBS football season. The team was led by sixth-year head coach Larry Fedora and played their home games at Kenan Memorial Stadium. The Tar Heels finished the season 3–9 overall and 1–7 in ACC play to place last out of seven teams in the Coastal Division.

== Schedule ==
Date	Time	Opponent	Site	TV	Result	Attendance
September 2	12:20 p.m.	California*	Kenan Memorial Stadium; Chapel Hill, NC	ACCN	L 30–35	49,500
September 9	12:00 p.m.	No. 17 Louisville	Kenan Memorial Stadium; Chapel Hill, NC	ESPN	L 35–47	47,000
September 16	3:30 p.m.	at Old Dominion*	Foreman Field; Norfolk, VA	Stadium	W 53–23	20,118
September 23	3:30 p.m.	Duke	Kenan Memorial Stadium; Chapel Hill, NC (Victory Bell)	ESPNU	L 17–27	59,000
September 30	12:00 p.m.	at Georgia Tech	Bobby Dodd Stadium; Atlanta, GA	ESPN2	L 7–33	42,805
October 7	3:30 p.m.	No. 21 Notre Dame*	Kenan Memorial Stadium; Chapel Hill, NC (rivalry)	ABC	L 10–33	57,000
October 14	3:30 p.m.	Virginia	Kenan Memorial Stadium; Chapel Hill, NC (South's Oldest Rivalry)	ACCRSN	L 14–20	50,000
October 21	3:30 p.m.	at No. 14 Virginia Tech	Lane Stadium; Blacksburg, VA	ESPN2	L 7–59	65,632
October 28	12:00 p.m.	No. 8 Miami (FL)	Kenan Memorial Stadium; Chapel Hill, NC	ESPN2	L 19–24	45,000
November 9	8:00 p.m.	at Pittsburgh	Heinz Field; Pittsburgh, PA	ESPN	W 34–31	34,056
November 18	3:00 p.m.	Western Carolina*	Kenan Memorial Stadium; Chapel Hill, NC	ACCN Extra	W 65–10	43,000
November 25	3:30 p.m.	at NC State	Carter–Finley Stadium; Raleigh, NC (rivalry)	ESPNU	L 21–33	57,600
*Non-conference game; Rankings from AP Poll released prior to the game; All times are in Eastern time

== Game summaries ==
=== California ===
	1	2	3	4	Total
Golden Bears	7	7	7	14	35
Tar Heels	7	10	7	6	30

=== Louisville ===
	1	2	3	4	Total
No. 17 Cardinals	10	10	7	20	47
Tar Heels	7	7	14	7	35

=== At Old Dominion ===
	1	2	3	4	Total
Tar Heels	11	28	7	7	53
Monarchs	0	7	10	6	23

=== Duke ===
	1	2	3	4	Total
Blue Devils	7	3	3	14	27
Tar Heels	3	7	7	0	17

=== At Georgia Tech ===
	1	2	3	4	Total
Tar Heels	0	0	0	7	7
Yellow Jackets	7	3	14	9	33

=== Notre Dame ===
	1	2	3	4	Total
No. 20 Fighting Irish	0	16	10	7	33
Tar Heels	0	7	0	3	10

=== Virginia ===
	1	2	3	4	Total
Cavaliers	0	10	7	3	20
Tar Heels	0	0	14	0	14

=== At Virginia Tech ===
	1	2	3	4	Total
Tar Heels	0	0	0	7	7
No. 14 Hokies	14	21	17	7	59

=== Miami (FL) ===
	1	2	3	4	Total
No. 8 Hurricanes	0	7	10	7	24
Tar Heels	3	3	7	6	19

=== At Pittsburgh ===
	1	2	3	4	Total
Tar Heels	14	10	3	7	34
Panthers	3	14	7	7	31

=== Western Carolina ===
	1	2	3	4	Total
Catamounts	7	0	0	3	10
Tar Heels	7	35	10	13	65

=== At NC State ===
	1	2	3	4	Total
Tar Heels	7	7	0	7	21
Wolfpack	6	6	7	14	33

== 2018 NFL draft ==
Player	Team	Round	Pick #	Position
Andre Smith	Carolina Panthers	7th	234	LB
Austin Proehl	Buffalo Bills	7th	255	WR
