= Wren High School =

Public high school in South Carolina, United States

Coordinates: 34°43′15.4″N 82°32′41.5″W

Location
- 905 Wren School Road; Piedmont, South Carolina 29673; United States

Information
- School type: Public high school
- Established: 1957 (69 years ago)
- School district: Anderson School District One
- CEEB code: 411632
- Principal: Daniel Bruce
- Athletic Director: Stan Yarborough
- Staff: 69.98 (FTE)
- Grades: 9–12
- Enrollment: 1,242 (2024–2025)
- Student to teacher ratio: 17.89
- Colors: Royal Blue and gold
- Mascot: Hurricanes
- Website: www.wrenhighschool.com

Wren High School (WHS) is a public high school in Anderson School District One in Anderson County, South Carolina, United States. It is accredited by the Southern Association of Colleges and Schools.

== Athletics ==
=== State championships ===
- Basketball - Girls: 1967
- Basketball - Boys: 2023
- Competitive Cheer: 1998, 2021
- Football: 2019
- Golf - Girls: 2011
- Golf - Boys: 2024
- Softball: 2008
- Track - Boys: 2004, 2021, 2022
- Volleyball: 2022, 2023
- Cross Country- Boys: 2023

== Notable alumni ==
- Shannon Faulkner (1993), first female cadet to enter the Citadel
- Wes Knight (2004), MLS professional soccer player
- Wesley Quinn (2008), former member of the musical group V Factory
- Kyle Fisher (2012), MLS professional soccer player
- Eli White (2013), Boston Red Sox outfielder
- D.J. Jones (2014), defensive tackle for the Denver Broncos
- Kelly Bryant (2015), Clemson, Missouri, CFL and XFL quarterback. Now a QB Coach at Woodland High School.

Honorable mentions:

- Trey McGowens (2018), older brother to Bryce. Guard for the Austin Spurs (NBA G League team for the San Antonio Spurs). Played at Wren from 2014-2017. Transferred to Hargrave Military Academy his senior year.
- Bryce McGowens (2020), Shooting Guard for the New Orleans Pelicans. Bryce transferred to Legacy Early College his senior year, making him an alumnus of Legacy in the class of 2020 and not Wren.
