= 2017 Georgia Tech Yellow Jackets football team =

American college football season

2017 Georgia Tech Yellow Jackets football
- Conference: Atlantic Coast Conference
- Coastal Division
- Record: 5–6 (4–4 ACC)
- Head coach: Paul Johnson (10th season)
- Offensive scheme: Flexbone triple option
- Defensive coordinator: Ted Roof (8th season)
- Base defense: Multiple 4–3
- Home stadium: Bobby Dodd Stadium

2017 Atlantic Coast Conference football standings
	Conf.			Overall
Team	W		L	W		L
Atlantic Division
No. 4 Clemson xy$^	7	–	1	12	–	2
No. 23 NC State	6	–	2	9	–	4
Wake Forest	4	–	4	8	–	5
Louisville	4	–	4	8	–	5
Boston College	4	–	4	7	–	6
Florida State	3	–	5	7	–	6
Syracuse	2	–	6	4	–	8
Coastal Division
No. 13 Miami (FL) xy	7	–	1	10	–	3
No. 24 Virginia Tech	5	–	3	9	–	4
Georgia Tech	4	–	4	5	–	6
Virginia	3	–	5	6	–	7
Pittsburgh	3	–	5	5	–	7
Duke	3	–	5	7	–	6
North Carolina	1	–	7	3	–	9
Championship: Clemson 38, Miami 3
^ – College Football Playoff participant; $ – Conference champion; x – Division champion/co-champions; y – Championship game participant; Rankings from AP Poll

The 2017 Georgia Tech Yellow Jackets football team represented the Georgia Institute of Technology during the 2017 NCAA Division I FBS football season. The Yellow Jackets were led by tenth-year head coach Paul Johnson and played their home games at Bobby Dodd Stadium. They competed as a member of the Coastal Division in the Atlantic Coast Conference. They finished the season 5–6, 4–4 in ACC play to finish in third place in the Coastal Division.

== Schedule ==
Date	Time	Opponent	Site	TV	Result	Attendance	Source
September 4	8:00 p.m.	vs. No. 25 Tennessee*	Mercedes-Benz Stadium; Atlanta, GA (Chick-fil-A Kickoff Game, rivalry)	ESPN	L 41–42 ^{2OT}	75,107	
September 9	12:30 p.m.	No. 5 (FCS) Jacksonville State*	Bobby Dodd Stadium; Atlanta, GA	ACCRSN	W 37–10	50,161	
September 16	7:30 p.m.	at UCF*	Spectrum Stadium; Orlando, FL	ESPNews	Cancelled		
September 23	12:20 p.m.	Pittsburgh	Bobby Dodd Stadium; Atlanta, GA	ACCN	W 35–17	40,211	
September 30	12:00 p.m.	North Carolina	Bobby Dodd Stadium; Atlanta, GA	ESPN2	W 33–7	42,805	
October 14	3:30 p.m.	at No. 11 Miami (FL)	Hard Rock Stadium; Miami Gardens, FL	ABC	L 24–25	55,799	
October 21	7:30 p.m.	Wake Forest^{†}	Bobby Dodd Stadium; Atlanta, GA	ESPNU	W 38–24	45,224	
October 28	8:00 p.m.	at No. 7 Clemson	Memorial Stadium; Clemson, SC (rivalry)	ABC/ESPN2	L 10–24	80,346	
November 4	3:00 p.m.	at Virginia	Scott Stadium; Charlottesville, VA	ACCRSN	L 36–40	38,448	
November 11	12:20 p.m.	No. 17 Virginia Tech	Bobby Dodd Stadium; Atlanta, GA (rivalry)	ACCN	W 28–22	47,909	
November 18	3:30 p.m.	at Duke	Wallace Wade Stadium; Durham, NC	ACCRSN	L 20–43	20,141	
November 25	12:00 p.m.	No. 7 Georgia*	Bobby Dodd Stadium; Atlanta, GA (Clean, Old-Fashioned Hate)	ABC	L 7–38	55,000	
*Non-conference game; ^{†}Homecoming; Rankings from AP Poll released prior to the game; All times are in Eastern time

== Game summaries ==
=== vs Tennessee ===
	1	2	3	4	OT	2OT	Total
No. 25 Volunteers	0	7	7	14	7	7	42
Yellow Jackets	7	7	7	7	7	6	41

Georgia Tech controlled the clock and dominated most of the game yardage wise, but gave up a key score in the final minutes of the 4th quarter. Georgia Tech had 2 missed field goal attempts that sent the game to overtime. During the second overtime, Coach Paul Johnson opted to try for a 2-point conversion to win the game there instead of kicking a point after try to tie the game and continue overtime play. Tennessee's defense came up with the stop and the Volunteers held on to the 1 point victory.

=== Jacksonville State ===
	1	2	3	4	Total
No. 5 (FCS) Gamecocks	0	7	0	0	7
Yellow Jackets	3	7	20	7	37

Georgia Tech had a poor offensive performance during the first half. Their only score was a touchdown after an interception gave the offense a short field. After some half time adjustments, Tech came storming out and put up 27 unanswered points to win the game.

=== at UCF ===
	1	2	3	4	Total
Yellow Jackets					0
Knights					0

The game was canceled due to the cleanup for Hurricane Irma.

=== Pittsburgh ===
	1	2	3	4	Total
Panthers	7	10	0	0	17
Yellow Jackets	7	14	7	7	35

Coach Pat Narduzzi of Pittsburgh a few days prior to the game criticized Georgia Tech's use of cut blocks during their offensive possessions calling them "dangerous." After Georgia Tech's win, Coach Paul Johnson criticized the Yellow Jacket offense for causing 4 turnovers and said they would not have won had they played a good team as what was described as a "snide" response to Narduzzi.

=== North Carolina ===
	1	2	3	4	Total
Tar Heels	0	0	0	7	7
Yellow Jackets	7	3	14	9	33

Georgia Tech received the opening kickoff and traded a few short drives with the Tar Heels before scoring on an 18-play drive. From then on, the Jackets dominated on both sides of the ball against a severely injured UNC team by using time of possession to their advantage and smothering the UNC offense. The Tar Heels scored late in the 4th quarter, against Tech's backup defenders, to end a 5-quarter shutout streak. Both TaQuon Marshall and Kirvonte Benson tallied over 130 yards rushing each on the day. This was Tech's first win against UNC in 4 years.

=== at Miami (FL) ===
	1	2	3	4	Total
Yellow Jackets	7	7	10	0	24
No. 11 Hurricanes	3	10	3	9	25

Tech led most of the game until the 4th quarter when Miami kept its chances alive with a long pass and miraculous catch. Miami would eventually kick the game winning field goal giving the Jackets their 2nd loss of the season.

=== Wake Forest ===
	1	2	3	4	Total
Demon Deacons	7	14	3	0	24
Yellow Jackets	3	10	12	13	38

=== at Clemson ===
	1	2	3	4	Total
Yellow Jackets	3	0	0	7	10
No. 7 Tigers	14	7	3	0	24

=== at Virginia ===
	1	2	3	4	Total
Yellow Jackets	7	7	14	8	36
Cavaliers	3	10	15	12	40

=== Virginia Tech ===
	1	2	3	4	Total
Hokies	3	6	7	6	22
Yellow Jackets	7	7	7	7	28

=== at Duke ===
	1	2	3	4	Total
Yellow Jackets	7	13	0	0	20
Blue Devils	3	17	10	13	43

=== Georgia ===
	1	2	3	4	Total
Bulldogs	7	10	14	7	38
Yellow Jackets	0	7	0	0	7

Despite coming within a touchdown near the end of the first half, Georgia Tech would go on to lose as Georgia would score 24 unanswered points in their way to a victory. Tech was officially disqualified from bowl eligibility with the loss causing their final record to be one win shy of qualifying.

== Rankings ==
Ranking movements Legend: ██ Increase in ranking ██ Decrease in ranking — = Not ranked RV = Received votes
	Week															
Poll	Pre	1	2	3	4	5	6	7	8	9	10	11	12	13	14	Final
AP	RV	RV	—	—	—	RV	RV	RV	RV	—	—	RV	—	—	—	—
Coaches	RV	RV	—	—	RV	RV	RV	RV	RV	—	—	—	—	—	—	—
CFP	Not released									—	—	—	—	—	—	Not released

== Coaching staff ==
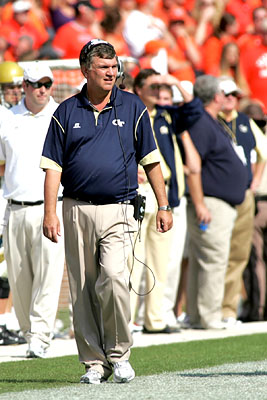
Head coach Paul Johnson

Name	Position	Seasons at Georgia Tech	Alma mater
Paul Johnson	Head coach	10	Western Carolina (1979)
Craig Candeto	Quarterbacks/B-Backs	1	Navy (2004)
Lamar S. Owens Jr.	A-Backs/special teams coordinator	10	Maryland (2008)
Al Preston	Wide Receivers	10	Hawai'i (1982)
Mike Sewak	Offensive Line	10	Virginia (1981)
Ted Roof	Defensive Coordinator/Linebackers	5	Georgia Tech (1986)
Andy McCollum	Safeties/Recruiting Coordinator	8	Austin Peay State (1981)
Mike Pelton	Defensive Line	5	Auburn (1999)
Joe Speed	Cornerbacks	8	Navy (1996)
Ron West	Co – Offensive line coach	2	Clemson (1979)
