= Kelly Bryant =

American football player (born 1996)

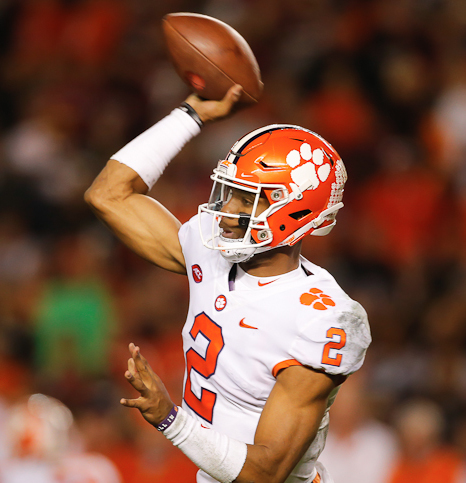
- Bryant playing for Clemson in 2017

No. 2, 13
- Position: Quarterback

Personal information
- Born: September 25, 1996 (age 30); Lowndesville, South Carolina, U.S.
- Listed height: 6 ft 3 in (1.91 m)
- Listed weight: 225 lb (102 kg)

Career information
- High school: Wren (Piedmont, South Carolina)
- College: Clemson (2015–2018); Missouri (2019)
- NFL draft: 2020: undrafted

Career history
- Toronto Argonauts (2021)*; Bismarck Bucks (2021); Toronto Argonauts (2021)*; FCF Zappers (2022); Arlington Renegades (2023)
- * Offseason or practice squad member only

Awards and highlights
- XFL champion (2023); FCF People's Champion (2022); CFP national champion (2016)
- Stats at CFL.ca

Kelly Bryant (born September 25, 1996) is an American former professional football quarterback. He played college football for the Missouri Tigers after previously playing for the Clemson Tigers.

== Early life ==
Bryant attended Wren High School in Piedmont, South Carolina. As a senior, he had 3,579 passing yards with 41 passing touchdowns, 720 rushing yards, and 14 rushing touchdowns. He committed to Clemson University to play college football under head coach Dabo Swinney. During Bryant's junior year of high school, he was unable to play in the first half of a game, as he was vomiting blood in the locker room. Bryant was taken to the hospital and after an MRI, doctors found a large abscess blocking his lower intestine. Had this abscess not been found, it may have burst, leading to a life-threatening infection in his entire body. Doctors were successfully able to remove the abscess through an emergency surgery.

College recruiting
Name	Hometown	School	Height	Weight	Commit date
Kelly Bryant; QB	Piedmont, SC	Wren HS	6 ft 4 in (1.93 m)	204 lb (93 kg)	Apr 17, 2014
Kelly Bryant; QB	Recruit ratings: Rivals: 247Sports: ESPN:				
Overall recruit ranking: Rivals: 11 (Dual-threat QB) ESPN: 10 (Dual-threat QB)
Note: In many cases, Scout, Rivals, 247Sports, On3, and ESPN may conflict in their listings of height and weight.; In these cases, the average was taken. ESPN grades are on a 100-point scale.; Sources: "Clemson Football Commitments". Rivals.; "ESPN". ESPN.; "2015 Team Ranking". Rivals.com.

== College career ==
=== Clemson ===
Bryant spent his first two years at Clemson as a backup to Deshaun Watson. During the two years, he completed 13 of 19 passes for 75 yards with a touchdown and interception. He also had 178 rushing yards over 35 carries with three touchdowns. During this time, Clemson would win both the 2015 and 2016 ACC Championships, as well as the 2017 CFP National Championship.

After Watson left for the 2017 NFL draft, Bryant was named Clemson's starting quarterback to open the 2017 season. Bryant led the Tigers to the 2017 ACC Championship, and a spot in the 2017 College Football Playoff, losing to eventual national champion Alabama in the Sugar Bowl. The 2017 Clemson Tigers finished the season with a record of 12–2.

On September 25, 2018, after week 4 of the 2018 season, coach Dabo Swinney announced that freshman Trevor Lawrence would be the new starting quarterback for the Tigers. As a result, Bryant decided to transfer. He maintained his final year of eligibility, despite starting 4 games of his senior year, due to a recent change in NCAA redshirt guidelines. The Tigers would go on to win the 2019 CFP Championship. Due to Bryant's decision to leave the team early in the season, Swinney chose not to give Bryant a championship ring.

=== Missouri ===
On December 5, 2018, Bryant announced that he would transfer to Missouri. The following year he became a quarterback for the 2019 Missouri Tigers. In the Tigers' first game of the 2019 season, a 37–31 loss at Wyoming, Bryant threw a career-high 423 yards.

=== Statistics ===
Year	Team	Games			Passing								Rushing			
Year	Team	GP	GS	Record	Cmp	Att	Pct	Yds	Avg	TD	INT	Rtg	Att	Yds	Avg	TD
2015	Clemson	8	0	—	7	9	77.8	27	3.0	0	1	80.8	23	156	6.8	2
2016	Clemson	4	0	—	6	9	66.7	48	5.3	1	0	148.1	12	22	1.8	1
2017	Clemson	14	14	12–2	262	398	65.8	2,802	7.0	13	8	131.7	192	665	3.5	11
2018	Clemson	4	4	4–0	36	54	66.7	461	8.5	2	1	146.9	33	130	4.3	2
2019	Missouri	10	10	5–5	181	292	62.0	2,215	7.6	15	6	138.5	106	242	2.3	1
Career		40	28	21–7	492	762	62.0	5,553	7.3	31	16	135.0	363	1,215	3.3	17

== Professional career ==
Pre-draft measurables
Height	Weight	Arm length	Hand span	Wingspan	40-yard dash	10-yard split	20-yard split	20-yard shuttle	Three-cone drill	Vertical jump	Broad jump
6 ft 3 1/8 in (1.91 m)	229 lb (104 kg)	32 1/4 in (0.82 m)	9 1/2 in (0.24 m)	6 ft 6 in (1.98 m)	4.69 s	1.59 s	2.73 s	4.51 s	7.33 s	35.0 in (0.89 m)	10 ft 5 in (3.18 m)
All values from NFL Combine

=== Toronto Argonauts ===
After going undrafted in the 2020 NFL draft, Bryant had a tryout with the Arizona Cardinals on August 14, 2020. On February 9, 2021, it was announced that Bryant had signed with the Toronto Argonauts, where his cousin, Martavis Bryant, had signed two weeks earlier. Bryant was released by the Argonauts on June 18. Bryant re-signed with Toronto on July 22 and assigned to practice roster. He was cut again on August 22.

=== Bismarck Bucks ===
In the one month interim between Argonauts stints, Bryant played two games for the Bismarck Bucks of the Indoor Football League (IFL), where he completed four out of five passes for 48 yards and a touchdown, and 11 rushes for 87 yards.

=== FCF Zappers ===
On March 30, 2022, Bryant signed with the Zappers of Fan Controlled Football. On his debut the following day on April 1, Bryant threw for 130 yards and 2 touchdowns with no interceptions, whilst also rushing for an extra two touchdowns on 47 yards. Overall, he threw for 234 yards, 5 touchdowns, and 2 interceptions for the season with a 55% completion rating. Bryant won the FCF People's Championship later that season and was named the game's MVP.

=== Arlington Renegades ===
Bryant signed with the Arlington Renegades of the XFL on April 3, 2023. Bryant played in one regular season game, recording one rushing attempt for 24 yards, and had five more rushes for 20 yards in the Renegades two playoff wins to claim the 2023 XFL championship. He was not part of the roster after the 2024 UFL dispersal draft on January 15, 2024.
