= Alabama–Clemson football rivalry =

American college football rivalry

- Alabama Crimson Tide Clemson Tigers
- First meeting: November 29, 1900; Clemson, 35–0
- Latest meeting: January 7, 2019; Clemson, 44–16
- Next meeting: TBA

Statistics
- Total meetings: 19
- All-time series: Alabama leads, 14–5
- Largest victory: Alabama, 74–7 (1931)
- Longest win streak: Alabama, 13 (1909–2016)
- Current win streak: Clemson, 1 (2019–present)

Locations of Alabama and Clemson

The Alabama–Clemson football rivalry is a college football rivalry game between the Crimson Tide of the University of Alabama and the Tigers of Clemson University.

== History ==
The two southern schools have long, decorated histories in the sport of college football. They first met on the football field on November 29, 1900. Clemson won the inaugural matchup by a score of 35–0. The Crimson Tide and Tigers met again in 1904 and 1905, with Clemson winning both games. Beginning with the next meeting between the two squads in 1909, Alabama won the next thirteen matchups against Clemson. The Tide posted the biggest margin of victory in the rivalry in 1931, whopping the Tigers by a margin of 74–7. In the first seven games of Alabama's 13-game streak, Clemson only scored seven total points and was shut out in six of the seven games. After a 56–0 shutout Alabama victory in 1975, the squads didn't meet again until 2008, when they squared off on opening weekend in Atlanta, Georgia. The Tide emerged with a 34–10 victory.

The last four matchups between the squads had national championship implications and have greatly intensified the rivalry. The teams squared off in the 2016 College Football Playoff National Championship in Glendale, Arizona, with Alabama emerging with a thrilling 45–40 victory. The next year, the teams again found themselves doing battle in the 2017 College Football Playoff National Championship in Tampa, Florida, with Clemson emerging with a thrilling 35–31 victory and their first win over the Crimson Tide since 1905. Once again the teams did battle in the 2018 Sugar Bowl in New Orleans, Louisiana with a trip to the 2018 College Football Playoff National Championship game on the line. Alabama won the contest by a score of 24–6. In the build-up to the 2018 Sugar Bowl, players and coaches from both teams referred to the series as a "respectful" rivalry. The next week, on January 8, 2018, Alabama would win the national championship over Georgia by a close score of 26–23, their 5th title in 9 seasons and 17th title overall. The two teams met again in the 2019 College Football Playoff National Championship, the fourth playoff match-up in the series in as many years, and the third to be in a championship game. Clemson blew out Alabama 44–16 in that meeting, to win their 3rd title, and their 2nd in 3 years.

There are numerous connections between the two programs. Clemson's top three winningest head coaches, Frank Howard, Dabo Swinney, and Danny Ford, all played at Alabama, as did Clemson coaches Hootie Ingram and Charley Pell.

== Game results ==
| Alabama victories | Clemson victories |

| No. | Date | Location | Winning team | | Losing team | |
|---|---|---|---|---|---|---|
| 1 | November 29, 1900 | Birmingham, AL | Clemson | 35 | Alabama | 0 |
| 2 | October 8, 1904 | Birmingham, AL | Clemson | 18 | Alabama | 0 |
| 3 | October 25, 1905 | Columbia, SC | Clemson | 25 | Alabama | 0 |
| 4 | October 16, 1909 | Birmingham, AL | Alabama | 3 | Clemson | 0 |
| 5 | October 11, 1913 | Tuscaloosa, AL | Alabama | 20 | Clemson | 0 |
| 6 | November 14, 1931 | Montgomery, AL | Alabama | 74 | Clemson | 7 |
| 7 | November 10, 1934 | Tuscaloosa, AL | Alabama | 40 | Clemson | 0 |
| 8 | November 9, 1935 | Tuscaloosa, AL | Alabama | 33 | Clemson | 0 |
| 9 | October 3, 1936 | Tuscaloosa, AL | Alabama | 32 | Clemson | 0 |
| 10 | October 8, 1966 | Tuscaloosa, AL | #4 Alabama | 26 | Clemson | 0 |
| 11 | October 28, 1967 | Clemson, SC | Alabama | 13 | Clemson | 10 |
| 12 | October 26, 1968 | Tuscaloosa, AL | Alabama | 21 | Clemson | 14 |
| 13 | October 25, 1969 | Clemson, SC | Alabama | 38 | Clemson | 13 |
| 14 | September 20, 1975 | Tuscaloosa, AL | #14 Alabama | 56 | Clemson | 0 |
| 15 | August 30, 2008 | Atlanta, GA | #24 Alabama | 34 | #9 Clemson | 10 |
| 16 | January 11, 2016 | Glendale, AZ | #2 Alabama | 45 | #1 Clemson | 40 |
| 17 | January 9, 2017 | Tampa, FL | #2 Clemson | 35 | #1 Alabama | 31 |
| 18 | January 1, 2018 | New Orleans, LA | #4 Alabama | 24 | #1 Clemson | 6 |
| 19 | January 7, 2019 | Santa Clara, CA | #2 Clemson | 44 | #1 Alabama | 16 |
Series: Alabama leads 14–5

=== Results by location ===
As of January 7, 2019

| State | City | Games | Alabama victories | Clemson victories | Years played |
|---|---|---|---|---|---|
| Alabama | Tuscaloosa | 7 | 7 | 0 | 1934–1936, 1966–1975 |
| Alabama | Birmingham | 3 | 1 | 2 | 1900, 1904, 1909 |
| Alabama | Montgomery | 1 | 1 | 0 | 1931 |
| South Carolina | Clemson | 2 | 2 | 0 | 1967, 1969 |
| South Carolina | Columbia | 1 | 0 | 1 | 1905 |
| California | Santa Clara | 1 | 0 | 1 | 2019 |
| Louisiana | New Orleans | 1 | 1 | 0 | 2018 |
| Florida | Tampa | 1 | 0 | 1 | 2017 |
| Arizona | Glendale | 1 | 1 | 0 | 2016 |
| Georgia | Atlanta | 1 | 1 | 0 | 2008 |

=== Record by game type ===
As of January 7, 2019

| Game type | Games | Alabama victories | Clemson victories |
|---|---|---|---|
| Regular season | 15 | 12 | 3 |
| CFP Final | 3 | 1 | 2 |
| CFP Semifinal | 1 | 1 | 0 |

== See also ==
- List of NCAA college football rivalry games
