= Kamrin Moore =

American football player (born 1996)

No. 29
- Position: Safety

Personal information
- Born: October 1, 1996 (age 30); District Heights, Maryland, U.S.
- Listed height: 5 ft 11 in (1.80 m)
- Listed weight: 203 lb (92 kg)

Career information
- High school: Bishop Denis J. O'Connell (Arlington, Virginia)
- College: Boston College
- NFL draft: 2018: 6th round, 189th overall pick

Career history
- New Orleans Saints (2018)*; New York Giants (2018); DC Defenders (2020)*
- * Offseason or practice squad member only
- Stats at Pro Football Reference

Kamrin Brian Moore (born October 1, 1996) is an American former professional football player who was a safety in the National Football League (NFL). He played college football for the Boston College Eagles, where he was a three-year starter at cornerback. His 2015 season was shortened by a tibia fracture. Moore missed the end of his senior season with a shoulder injury and still had 50 total tackles with nine pass breakups in 2017.

== Professional career ==
=== New Orleans Saints ===
Moore was selected by the New Orleans Saints in the sixth round, 189th overall, of the 2018 NFL draft. The Saints previously acquired the pick in a trade that sent Adrian Peterson to the Arizona Cardinals. On May 10, 2018, Moore signed his rookie contract with the Saints. He was waived by the Saints on September 1, 2018.

=== New York Giants ===
On September 2, 2018, Moore was claimed off waivers by the New York Giants.

On July 15, 2019, Moore was suspended by the team following an arrest for an alleged domestic violence-related incident. He was placed on the NFL commissioner's exempt list on July 24, 2019. He was waived by the Giants on August 31, 2019.

=== DC Defenders ===
On November 22, 2019, Moore was selected by the DC Defenders of the XFL in the 2020 XFL Supplemental Draft.

== Legal issues ==
On July 11, 2019, Moore was arrested in Linden, New Jersey for third-degree assault, where he allegedly knocked a woman unconscious. Four days later, the Giants suspended Moore. A judge ordered the restraining order dropped on August 14, 2019. He was cleared by a grand jury on October 29, 2019.
