= Dorian O'Daniel =

American football player (born 1994)

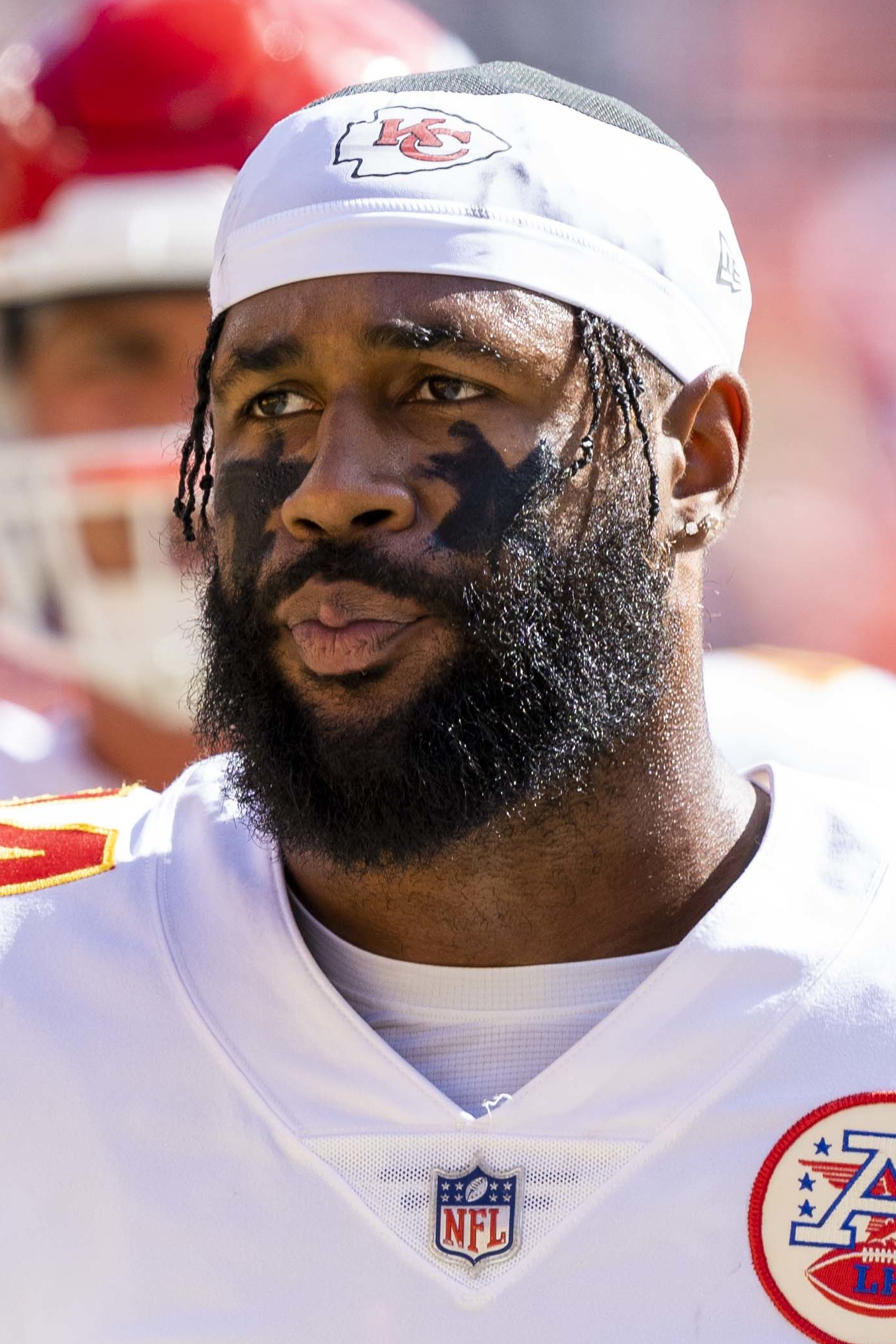
- O'Daniel with the Kansas City Chiefs in 2021

Profile
- Position: Linebacker

Personal information
- Born: September 4, 1994 (age 32); Canonsburg, Pennsylvania, U.S.
- Listed height: 6 ft 1 in (1.85 m)
- Listed weight: 220 lb (100 kg)

Career information
- High school: Our Lady of Good Counsel (Olney, Maryland)
- College: Clemson
- NFL draft: 2018: 3rd round, 100th overall pick

Career history
- Kansas City Chiefs (2018–2021); Pittsburgh Maulers (2024)*
- * Offseason or practice squad member only

Awards and highlights
- Super Bowl champion (LIV); CFP national champion (2016); Second-team All-American (2017); Second-team All-ACC (2017)

Career NFL statistics
- Total tackles: 58
- Sacks: 1
- Fumble recoveries: 1
- Pass deflections: 1
- Stats at Pro Football Reference

Dorian O'Daniel (born September 4, 1994) is an American professional football linebacker. He played college football for the Clemson Tigers.

== Early life ==
O'Daniel played as a running back for Our Lady of Good Counsel High School where as a senior, he aided the team in finishing the season with an 11–1 record. His senior accolades included making Montgomery Sentinel Offensive Player-of-the-Year and Gazette Montgomery County Player-of-the-Year. As a senior, O'Daniel also scored 18 touchdowns in 10 games. As an outside linebacker, O'Daniel was ranked 6th in the nation by Rivals.com, 8th by ESPN, 11th by Scout.com, 13th by 247Sports.com and 16th by MaxPreps. O'Daniel was a three-year letterman prior to committing to Clemson University. His commitment to Clemson made him the first athlete from the state of Maryland since Jeff Fortner joined Clemson in 1991.

== College career ==
After his redshirt season in 2013, O'Daniel started 1 of 12 total games. During the 2014 season, O'Daniel's 12 games included 31 tackles, one tackle for loss, one sack and one caused fumble in 87 snaps. On November 15, 2014, O'Daniel's performance against Georgia Tech earned him a team co-defensive player-of-the-game accolade. On December 29, 2014, O'Daniel's performance against Oklahoma earned him the accolade of special teams player-of-the-game. In the 2015, O'Daniel was once more part of Clemson's special teams, recording 32 tackles, 19 made with special teams in 15 total games. By his junior season in 2016, O'Daniel rose to a starting linebacker role. He also started 10 of the total 15 games, recording 116 tackles, making 60 of his tackles in 479 snaps over the course of the season. O'Daniel finished his senior season in 2017 with 104 tackles, 11.5 tackles for loss and five sacks. At 6 ft 1 in and 220 lbs, O'Daniel was considered undersized by NFL recruiting experts. He was recognized however for his "instincts, athletic ability and a nonstop motor."

== Professional career ==
=== Pre-draft ===
O'Daniel attended the NFL Scouting Combine in Indianapolis and completed all of the combine and positional drills. On March 15, 2018, he attended Clemson's pro day, but opted to stand on his combine numbers and only performed positional drills. O'Daniel also attended meetings and private workouts with multiple teams, including the Pittsburgh Steelers, Houston Texans, and Buffalo Bills. At the conclusion of the pre-draft process, O'Daniel was projected to be a third or fourth round pick by NFL draft experts and scouts. He was ranked as the sixth best outside linebacker prospect in the draft by DraftScout.com and was ranked the 11th best outside linebacker by Scouts Inc.

Pre-draft measurables
| Height | Weight | Arm length | Hand span | Wingspan | 40-yard dash | 10-yard split | 20-yard split | 20-yard shuttle | Three-cone drill | Vertical jump | Broad jump | Bench press |
|---|---|---|---|---|---|---|---|---|---|---|---|---|
| 6 ft 0 5/8 in (1.84 m) | 223 lb (101 kg) | 31 1/8 in (0.79 m) | 9 in (0.23 m) | 6 ft 3 in (1.91 m) | 4.61 s | 1.59 s | 2.71 s | 4.07 s | 6.64 s | 32 in (0.81 m) | 9 ft 11 in (3.02 m) | 21 reps |
All values from NFL Combine

=== Kansas City Chiefs ===
The Kansas City Chiefs selected O'Daniel in the third round (100th overall) of the 2018 NFL draft. O'Daniel was the 13th linebacker drafted in 2018.

External videos
- Chiefs draft Dorian O'Daniel 100th overall
- 2018 NFL Draft Profile: Dorian O'Daniel

On May 30, 2018, the Chiefs signed O'Daniel to a four-year, $3.34 million contract that includes a signing bonus of $761,516. O'Daniel won his first Super Bowl championship when the Chiefs defeated the San Francisco 49ers 31–20 in Super Bowl LIV.

On December 5, 2020, O'Daniel was placed on injured reserve with an ankle injury. On January 16, 2021, O'Daniel was activated off of the injured reserve ahead of the Chiefs' Divisional Round playoff game against the Cleveland Browns.

=== Pittsburgh Maulers ===
On October 5, 2023, O'Daniel signed with the Pittsburgh Maulers of the United States Football League (USFL). The Maulers folded when the XFL and USFL merged to create the United Football League (UFL).
