= Deon Cain =

American football player (born 1996)

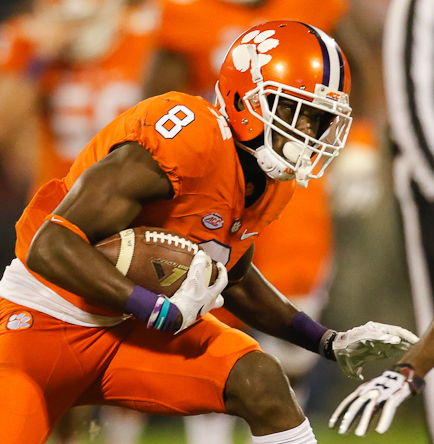
- Cain with the Clemson Tigers in 2016

Profile
- Position: Wide receiver

Personal information
- Born: August 9, 1996 (age 30); Tampa, Florida, U.S.
- Listed height: 6 ft 2 in (1.88 m)
- Listed weight: 194 lb (88 kg)

Career information
- High school: Tampa Bay Technical
- College: Clemson (2015–2017)
- NFL draft: 2018: 6th round, 185th overall pick

Career history
- Indianapolis Colts (2018–2019); Pittsburgh Steelers (2019–2020); Baltimore Ravens (2021)*; Philadelphia Eagles (2021–2022)*; Birmingham Stallions (2023); Philadelphia Eagles (2023)*; Birmingham Stallions (2024); Buffalo Bills (2024)*; Carolina Panthers (2024)*; Buffalo Bills (2024)*; Birmingham Stallions (2025); Buffalo Bills (2025)*; Birmingham Stallions (2026)
- * Offseason or practice squad member only

Awards and highlights
- UFL champion (2024); USFL champion (2023); USFL championship game MVP (2023); All-UFL Team (2025); Third-team All-ACC (2017)

Career NFL statistics
- Receptions: 9
- Receiving yards: 124
- Stats at Pro Football Reference

Deon Cain (born August 9, 1996) is an American professional football wide receiver. He played college football at Clemson. He was selected by the Indianapolis Colts in the sixth round of the 2018 NFL draft. He was also named MVP of the 2023 USFL championship game.

== Early life ==
Cain attended Tampa Bay Technical High School in Tampa, Florida. He played quarterback for the high school football team. He was rated as a five-star recruit and committed to Clemson University to play college football under head coach Dabo Swinney.

== College career ==
Cain moved to wide receiver at Clemson. As a true freshman in 2015, he played in 13 games, recording 34 receptions for 582 yards and five touchdowns. He did not play in the 2015 Orange Bowl or 2016 College Football Playoff National Championship due to suspension for failing a drug test. Cain returned from the suspension in 2016, and played in all 15 games, including Clemson's 2017 College Football Playoff National Championship victory over Alabama. For the season, he had 38 receptions for 724 yards and nine touchdowns. After his junior season, Cain decided to forgo his senior year and declare for the 2018 NFL draft.

== Professional career ==
Pre-draft measurables
Height	Weight	Arm length	Hand span	Wingspan	40-yard dash	10-yard split	20-yard split	20-yard shuttle	Three-cone drill	Vertical jump	Broad jump	Bench press
6 ft 1 7/8 in (1.88 m)	202 lb (92 kg)	33 in (0.84 m)	8 3/4 in (0.22 m)	6 ft 7 5/8 in (2.02 m)	4.43 s	1.53 s	2.63 s	4.37 s	6.71 s	33.5 in (0.85 m)	9 ft 7 in (2.92 m)	11 reps
All values from NFL Combine

=== Indianapolis Colts ===
Cain was selected by the Indianapolis Colts in the sixth round (185th overall) of the 2018 NFL draft. In the first preseason game, Cain suffered a torn ACL after a promising training camp, prematurely ending his rookie season. Cain was placed on injured reserve on August 12, 2018. He made his NFL debut in the Colts' 2019 season opener against the Los Angeles Chargers. In the 30–24 loss, he had two receptions for 35 yards. He was waived on November 9.

=== Pittsburgh Steelers ===
On November 16, 2019, Cain was signed off the Colts practice squad by the Pittsburgh Steelers. In 6 games with the Steelers, Cain caught 5 passes for 72 yards.

He was waived on September 5, 2020, and was signed to the practice squad the next day. He was elevated to the active roster on October 17 and January 2, 2021, for the team's weeks 6 and 17 games, each against the Cleveland Browns, and reverted to the practice squad after each game. His practice squad contract with the team expired after the season on January 18.

=== Baltimore Ravens ===
On January 22, 2021, Cain signed a reserve/futures contract with the Baltimore Ravens. On August 31, he was placed on injured reserve, and released three days later.

=== Philadelphia Eagles (first stint) ===
On October 18, 2021, Cain was signed to the Philadelphia Eagles' practice squad. He signed a reserve/future contract with the Eagles on January 18, 2022.

On August 30, 2022, Cain was waived by the Eagles and re-signed to the practice squad the following day. He was released by Philadelphia on October 31.

On November 11, 2022, the Tennessee Titans hosted Cain for a workout.

=== Birmingham Stallions (first stint) ===
On March 8, 2023, Cain signed with the Birmingham Stallions of the United States Football League (USFL). He caught 16 passes for 182 yards and two touchdowns. He was named 2023 USFL championship game MVP after he caught three touchdown passes when his team won the championship game at the end of the season. His contract was terminated after the season on July 10, to sign with an NFL team.

=== Philadelphia Eagles (second stint) ===
On July 25, 2023, Cain signed with the Philadelphia Eagles. He was released on August 27, as part of final roster cuts before the start of the regular season.

=== Birmingham Stallions (second stint) ===
On November 30, 2023, Cain re-signed with the Stallions. His contract was terminated on August 12, 2024, to sign with an NFL team.

=== Buffalo Bills (first stint) ===
On August 13, 2024, Cain signed with the Buffalo Bills following an injury to Chase Claypool. He was released as part of final roster cuts on August 27.

=== Carolina Panthers ===
Cain was added to the practice squad of the Carolina Panthers on August 30, 2024. He was released by the Panthers on October 15.

=== Buffalo Bills (second stint) ===
Cain was re-signed to the Bills practice squad on October 31, 2024. He was waived on December 3.

=== Birmingham Stallions (third stint) ===
On February 7, 2025, Cain re-signed with the Birmingham Stallions. On June 2, Cain was selected for the All-UFL Team.

=== Buffalo Bills (third stint) ===
On July 28, 2025, Cain signed with the Bills on a one-year contract. He was released on August 26 as part of final roster cuts.

=== Birmingham Stallions (fourth stint) ===
On January 13, 2026, Cain was selected by the Birmingham Stallions via pick protection.

== Career statistics ==
=== NFL ===
Year	Team	Games		Receiving						Fumbles	
Year	Team	GP	GS	Tgt	Rec	Yds	Avg	Lng	TD	Fum	Lost
2018	IND	0	0	Did not play due to injury							
2019	IND	7	3	14	4	52	13.0	25	0	0	0
2019	PIT	6	3	6	5	72	14.4	35	0	0	0
2020	PIT	2	0	0	0	0	0.0	0	0	0	0
Career		15	6	20	9	124	13.8	35	0	0	0

=== USFL/UFL ===
Legend
	Championship Game MVP
	Led the league
	League champion
**Bold**	Career high

Regular season

Year	Team	League	Games		Receiving					Kickoff returns				
Year	Team	League	GP	GS	Rec	Yds	Avg	Lng	TD	Ret	Yds	Avg	Lng	TD
2023	BHAM	USFL	8	5	16	182	11.4	38	2	**22**	**606**	**27.6**	**91**	**2**
2024	BHAM	UFL	**10**	**10**	**33**	436	13.2	40	3	14	281	20.1	39	0
2025	BHAM	UFL	9	9	29	**514**	**17.7**	**65**	**6**	16	421	26.3	42	0
2026	BHAM	UFL	10	9	25	295	11.8	**67**	4	11	266	24.2	40	0
Career			37	33	103	1,427	13.9	67	15	63	1,574	25.0	91	2

Postseason

Year	Team	League	Games		Receiving					Kickoff returns				
Year	Team	League	GP	GS	Rec	Yds	Avg	Lng	TD	Ret	Yds	Avg	Lng	TD
2023	BHAM	USFL	2	2	12	144	12.0	40	3	8	165	20.6	34	0
2024	BHAM	UFL	2	2	4	25	6.3	11	0	2	69	34.5	39	0
2025	BHAM	UFL	1	1	6	124	20.7	65	0	0	0	0.0	0	0
Career			5	5	22	293	13.3	65	3	10	234	23.4	39	0

=== College ===
Season	Team	Games		Receiving			
Season	Team	GP	GS	Rec	Yds	Avg	TD
2015	Clemson	13	1	34	582	17.1	5
2016	Clemson	15	0	38	724	19.1	9
2017	Clemson	14	13	58	734	12.7	6
Career		42	14	130	2,040	15.7	20
