= Adam Choice =

American football player (born 1995)

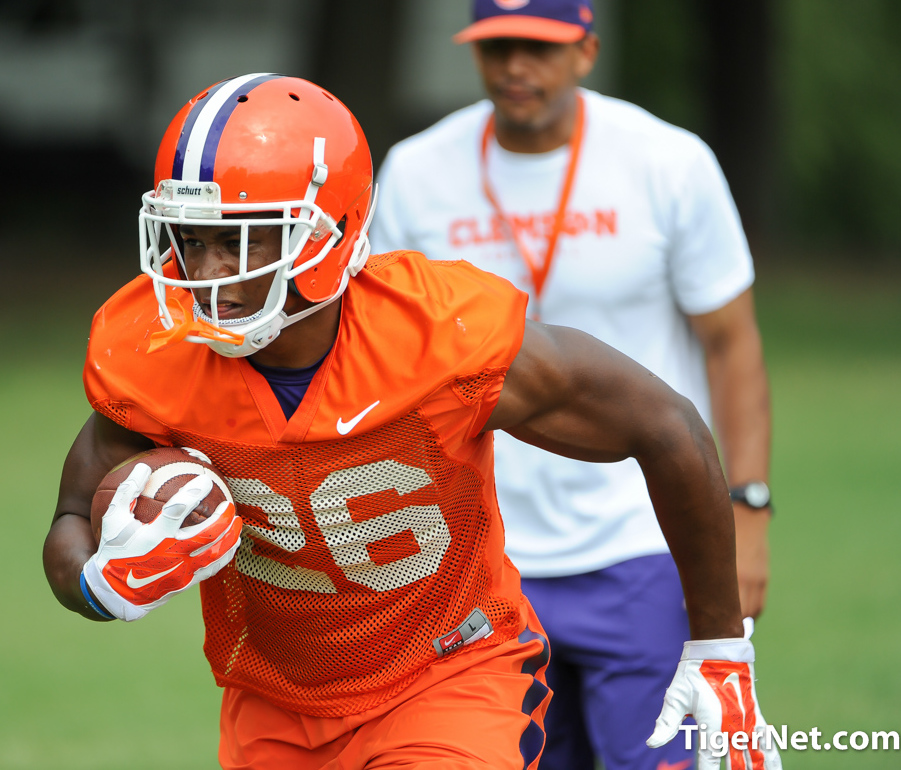

Profile
- Position: Running back

Personal information
- Born: November 30, 1995 (age 30); Thomasville, Georgia, U.S.
- Listed height: 5 ft 9 in (1.75 m)
- Listed weight: 188 lb (85 kg)

Career information
- High school: Thomas County Central (Thomasville, Georgia)
- College: Clemson
- NFL draft: 2019: undrafted

Career history
- Seattle Seahawks (2019); TSL Sea Lions (2021)

Awards and highlights
- CFP national champion (2018)
- Stats at Pro Football Reference

Adam Choice (born November 30, 1995) is an American former professional football player who was a running back in the National Football League (NFL). He played college football for the Clemson Tigers.

== Early life ==
Choice attended Thomas County Central High School in Thomasville, Georgia. During his high school football career, he had over 5,000 rushing yards playing at the quarterback position. He committed to Clemson to play college football at the running back position.

== College career ==
As a true freshman at Clemson University in 2014, Choice played in six games, rushing for 218 yards on 50 carries. However, on October 18, 2014, Choice suffered a season ending torn ACL at Boston College. Choice was redshirted the following year. Choice returned as a reserve running back for the 2016–2018 seasons finishing his college career with 1,250 rushing yards on 239 carries and 14 touchdowns. Choice earned a master's degree in human resource development.

== Professional career ==
Choice was signed as an undrafted free agent by the Seattle Seahawks on May 3, 2019. He was waived/injured on May 29, 2019, and placed on injured reserve. He was waived on May 4, 2020.

== Personal life ==
Choice is the cousin of former NFL running backs Tashard Choice and Joe Burns.
