= 2017 Camping World Bowl =

American college football game

- 28th Camping World Bowl
| Virginia Tech Hokies | Oklahoma State Cowboys |
| (9–3) | (9–3) |
| ACC | Big 12 |
| 21 | 30 |
| Head coach: Justin Fuente | Head coach: Mike Gundy |
| AP / Coaches / CFP; 22 / 22 / 22 | AP / Coaches / CFP; 17 / 17 / 19 |
| | 1 | 2 | 3 | 4 | Total |
|---|---|---|---|---|---|
| Virginia Tech | 7 | 0 | 7 | 7 | 21 |
| Oklahoma State | 3 | 10 | 14 | 3 | 30 |
- Date: December 28, 2017
- Season: 2017
- Stadium: Camping World Stadium
- Location: Orlando, Florida
- MVP: Mason Rudolph (QB, Oklahoma State)
- Favorite: Oklahoma State by 6.5
- Referee: John O'Neill (Big Ten)
- Attendance: 39,610
- Payout: US$TBD

United States TV coverage
- Network: ESPN/ESPN Radio
- Announcers: TV: Beth Mowins, Anthony Becht, Rocky Boiman; Radio: Mark Neely, John Congemi, Chris Doering

The 2017 Camping World Bowl was a post-season American college football bowl game played on December 28, 2017, at the Camping World Stadium in Orlando, Florida. The 28th edition of the Camping World Bowl featured the Virginia Tech Hokies of the Atlantic Coast Conference against the Oklahoma State Cowboys of the Big 12 Conference. It was one of the 2017–18 bowl games concluding the 2017 FBS football season. The game's naming rights sponsor was the Camping World recreational vehicle company.

== Teams ==
The game featured tie-ins from the Atlantic Coast Conference and the Big 12 Conference.

== Game summary ==
=== Scoring summary ===
Scoring summary

| Quarter | Time | Drive | | | Team | Scoring information | Score | |
| Quarter | Time | Plays | Yards | TOP | Team | Scoring information | VT | OKST |
|---|---|---|---|---|---|---|---|---|
| 1 | 12:17 | 9 | 61 | 2:43 | OKST | 31-yard field goal by Matt Ammendola | 0 | 3 |
| 1 | 7:59 | 8 | 76 | 4:48 | VT | Josh Jackson 76-yard touchdown run, Joey Slye kick good | 7 | 3 |
| 2 | 7:28 | 9 | 69 | 3:12 | OKST | 36-yard field goal by Matt Ammendola | 7 | 6 |
| 2 | 0:45 | 4 | 81 | 0:39 | OKST | Justice Hill 1-yard touchdown run, Matt Ammendola kick good | 7 | 13 |
| 3 | 11:22 | 8 | 79 | 2:25 | OKST | Dillon Stoner 17-yard touchdown reception from Mason Rudloph, Matt Ammendola kick good | 7 | 20 |
| 3 | 6:31 | 9 | 79 | 4:51 | VT | Eric Kumah 9-yard touchdown reception from Josh Jackson, Joey Slye kick good | 14 | 20 |
| 3 | 5:37 | 4 | 76 | 0:54 | OKST | James Washington 65-yard touchdown reception from Mason Rudolph, Matt Ammendola kick good | 14 | 27 |
| 4 | 5:40 | 7 | 61 | 1:06 | VT | Josh Jackson 5-yard touchdown run, Joey Slye kick good | 21 | 27 |
| 4 | 2:34 | 10 | 54 | 3:06 | OKST | 38-yard field goal by Matt Ammendola | 21 | 30 |
| "TOP" = time of possession. For other American football terms, see Glossary of American football. | | | | | | | 21 | 30 |

=== Statistics ===
| | 1 | 2 | 3 | 4 | Total |
|---|---|---|---|---|---|
| No. 22 Hokies | 7 | 0 | 7 | 7 | 21 |
| No. 19 Cowboys | 3 | 10 | 14 | 3 | 30 |

| Statistics | VT | OKST |
|---|---|---|
| First downs | 31 | 24 |
| Plays–yards | 92–518 | 64–488 |
| Rushes–yards | 50–248 | 32–137 |
| Passing yards | 270 | 351 |
| Passing: Comp–Att–Int | 23–42–1 | 21–32–0 |
| Time of possession | 38:13 | 21:47 |

| Team | Category | Player | Statistics |
|---|---|---|---|
| VT | Passing | Josh Jackson | 22/41, 248 yds, 1 TD, 1 INT |
| VT | Rushing | Deshawn McClease | 18 car, 124 yds |
| VT | Receiving | Eric Kumah | 5 rec, 72 yds, 1 TD |
| OKST | Passing | Mason Rudloph | 21/32, 351 yds, 2 TD |
| OKST | Rushing | Justice Hill | 23 car, 120 yds, 1 TD |
| OKST | Receiving | James Washington | 5 rec, 126 yds, 1 TD |
