= 2017 Oklahoma State Cowboys football team =

American college football season

2017 Oklahoma State Cowboys football

Camping World Bowl champion

Camping World Bowl, W 30–21 vs. Virginia Tech
- Conference: Big 12 Conference

Ranking
- Coaches: No. 14
- AP: No. 14
- Record: 10–3 (6–3 Big 12)
- Head coach: Mike Gundy (13th season)
- Offensive coordinator: Mike Yurcich (5th season)
- Offensive scheme: Spread
- Defensive coordinator: Glenn Spencer (5th season)
- Base defense: 4–3
- Home stadium: Boone Pickens Stadium

2017 Big 12 Conference football standings
	Conf.			Overall
Team	W		L	W		L
No. 3 Oklahoma y$^	8	–	1	12	–	2
No. 9 TCU y	7	–	2	11	–	3
No. 14 Oklahoma State	6	–	3	10	–	3
Texas	5	–	4	7	–	6
West Virginia	5	–	4	7	–	6
Kansas State	5	–	4	8	–	5
Iowa State	5	–	4	8	–	5
Texas Tech	3	–	6	6	–	7
Baylor	1	–	8	1	–	11
Kansas	0	–	9	1	–	11
Championship: Oklahoma 41, TCU 17
^ – College Football Playoff participant; $ – Conference champion; y – Championship game participant; Rankings from AP Poll

The 2017 Oklahoma State Cowboys football team represented Oklahoma State University in the 2017 NCAA Division I FBS football season. The Cowboys played their home games at the Boone Pickens Stadium in Stillwater, Oklahoma and competed in the Big 12 Conference. They were led by 13th-year head coach Mike Gundy. They finished the season 10–3, 6–3 in Big 12 play to finish in third place. They were invited to the Camping World Bowl where they defeated Virginia Tech.

== Schedule ==
Oklahoma State announced its 2017 football schedule on December 13, 2016. The 2017 schedule consisted of 6 home and 6 away games in the regular season. The Cowboys hosted Big 12 foes Baylor, Kansas, Kansas State, Oklahoma, and TCU, and traveled to Iowa State, Texas, Texas Tech, and West Virginia.

The Cowboys hosted one of the three non-conference opponents, Tulsa from the American Athletic Conference and traveled to Pittsburgh from the Atlantic Coast Conference and South Alabama from the Sun Belt Conference.

Date	Time	Opponent	Rank	Site	TV	Result	Attendance
August 31	6:30 p.m.	Tulsa*	No. 10	Boone Pickens Stadium; Stillwater, OK (rivalry)	FS1	W 59–24	56,790
September 8	7:00 p.m.	at South Alabama*	No. 11	Ladd–Peebles Stadium; Mobile, AL	ESPN2	W 44–7	26,487
September 16	11:00 a.m.	at Pittsburgh*	No. 9	Heinz Field; Pittsburgh, PA	ESPN	W 59–21	38,952
September 23	2:30 p.m.	No. 16 TCU	No. 6	Boone Pickens Stadium; Stillwater, OK	ESPN	L 31–44	56,790
September 30	7:00 p.m.	at Texas Tech	No. 15	Jones AT&T Stadium; Lubbock, TX	FOX	W 41–34	60,901
October 14	2:30 p.m.	Baylor^{†}	No. 14	Boone Pickens Stadium; Stillwater, OK	FS1/FBN	W 59–16	56,790
October 21	11:00 a.m.	at Texas	No. 10	Darrell K Royal–Texas Memorial Stadium; Austin, TX	ABC	W 13–10 ^{OT}	92,506
October 28	11:00 a.m.	at No. 22 West Virginia	No. 11	Mountaineer Field; Morgantown, WV	ABC	W 50–39	57,507
November 4	3:00 p.m.	No. 5 Oklahoma	No. 11	Boone Pickens Stadium; Stillwater, OK (Bedlam Series, College GameDay)	FS1	L 52–62	56,790
November 11	11:00 a.m.	at No. 21 Iowa State	No. 15	Jack Trice Stadium; Ames, IA	ABC/ESPN2	W 49–42	61,500
November 18	2:30 p.m.	Kansas State	No. 13	Boone Pickens Stadium; Stillwater, OK	ESPN2	L 40–45	56,790
November 25	11:00 a.m.	Kansas	No. 19	Boone Pickens Stadium; Stillwater, OK	FS1	W 58–17	56,790
December 28	4:15 p.m.	vs. No. 22 Virginia Tech*	No. 19	Camping World Stadium; Orlando, FL (Camping World Bowl)	ESPN	W 30–21	39,610
*Non-conference game; ^{†}Homecoming; Rankings from AP Poll and CFP Rankings after October 31 released prior to game; All times are in Central time

== Game summaries ==
=== Tulsa ===
Tulsa Golden Hurricane at No. 10 Oklahoma State Cowboys – Game summary

Quarter	1	2	3	4	Total
Golden Hurricane	0	17	0	7	24
No. 10 Cowboys	21	17	14	7	59

at Boone Pickens Stadium, Stillwater, OK

- Date: August 31
- Game time: 6:30 p.m.
- Game weather: Temperature: 83 °F (28 °C) • Weather: sunny • Wind: NE 8 MPH
- Game attendance: 56,790
- Referee: Dan Romeo
- TV announcers (FS1): Joe Davis (play-by-play), Brady Quinn (color), Bruce Feldman (reporter)

Game information

First quarter

- OKST – Tyron Johnson 44-yard pass from Mason Rudolph (Matt Ammendola kick), 12:59. Cowboys 7–0. Drive: 8 plays, 74 yards, 2:01.
- OKST – James Washington 40-yard pass from Mason Rudolph (Matt Ammendola kick), 6:35. Cowboys 14–0. Drive: 6 plays, 81 yards, 2:13.
- OKST – Justice Hill 3-yard run (Matt Ammendola kick), 4:08. Cowboys 21–0. Drive: 2 plays, 52 yards, 0:17.

Second quarter

- TLSA – Adam Higuera 0-yard fumble recovery (Redford Jones kick), 10:38. Cowboys 21–7. Drive: 3 plays, 21 yards, 1:18.
- OKST – J.D. King 71-yard run (Matt Ammendola kick), 10:06. Cowboys 28–7. Drive: 2 plays, 75 yards, 0:32.
- TLSA – Corey Taylor II 3-yard run (Redford Jones kick), 6:18. Cowboys 28–14. Drive: 13 plays, 75 yards, 3:48.
- OKST – Matt Ammendola 24-yard field goal, 3:29. Cowboys 31–14. Drive: 9 plays, 60 yards, 2:49.
- OKST – James Washington 77-yard pass from Mason Rudolph (Matt Ammendola kick), 2:04. Cowboys 38–14. Drive: 1 play, 77 yards, 0:10.
- TLSA – Redford Jones 23-yard field goal, 0:00. Cowboys 38–17. Drive: 4 plays, 18 yards, 0:33.

Third quarter

- OKST – Mason Rudolph 1-yard run (Matt Ammendola kick), 6:37. Cowboys 45–17. Drive: 14 plays, 80 yards, 5:29.
- OKST – Kenneth Edison-McGruder 82-yard fumble recovery (Matt Ammendola kick), 2:14. Cowboys 52–17. Drive: 13 plays, 65 yards, 4:23.

Fourth quarter

- OKST – La'Darren Brown 15-yard run (Matt Ammendola kick), 7:55. Cowboys 59–17. Drive: 2 plays, 20 yards, 0:34.
- TLSA – Corey Taylor II 55-yard run (Redford Jones kick), 5:35. Cowboys 59–24. Drive: 6 plays, 75 yards, 2:20.

Leading Passers

- TLSA – Chad President – 18/35, 178 yards
- OKST – Mason Rudolph – 20/34, 303 yards, 3 TD

Leading Rushers

- TLSA – Corey Taylor II – 20 carries, 111 yards, 2 TD
- OKST – Justice Hill – 15 carries, 132 yards, TD

Leading Receivers

- TLSA – Justin Hobbs – 6 receptions, 71 yards
- OKST – James Washington – 6 receptions, 145 yards, 2 TD

=== At South Alabama ===
No. 11 Oklahoma State Cowboys at South Alabama Jaguars – Game summary

Quarter	1	2	3	4	Total
No. 11 Cowboys	17	3	21	3	44
Jaguars	0	0	0	7	7

at Ladd–Peebles Stadium, Mobile, AL

- Date: September 8
- Game time: 7:00 p.m.
- Game weather: Temperature: 79 °F (26 °C) • Weather: sunny • Wind: N 9 MPH
- Game attendance: 26,487
- Referee: David Smith
- TV announcers (ESPN2): Adam Amin (play-by-play), Dusty Dvoracek (color), Molly McGrath (reporter)

Game information

First quarter

- OKST – Matt Ammendola 31-yard field goal, 7:32. Cowboys 3–0. Drive: 12 plays, 57 yards, 3:58.
- OKST – James Washington 66-yard pass from Mason Rudolph (Matt Ammendola kick), 5:31. Cowboys 10–0. Drive: 2 plays, 68 yards, 0:29.
- OKST – Marcell Ateman 4-yard pass from Mason Rudolph (Matt Ammendola kick), 1:36. Cowboys 17–0. Drive: 7 plays, 73 yards, 2:23.

Second quarter

- OKST – Matt Ammendola 53-yard field goal, 0:11. Cowboys 20–0. Drive: 8 plays, 44 yards, 1:06.

Third quarter

- OKST – Marcell Ateman 20-yard pass from Mason Rudolph (Matt Ammendola kick), 11:16. Cowboys 27–0. Drive: 4 plays, 43 yards, 0:58.
- OKST – Mason Rudolph 10-yard run (Matt Ammendola kick), 7:44. Cowboys 34–0. Drive: 6 plays, 63 yards, 1:54.
- OKST – Justin Phillips 25-yard interception return (Matt Ammendola kick), 4:12. Cowboys 41–0. Drive: 2 plays, 0 yards, 0:52.

Fourth quarter

- OKST – Matt Ammendola 48-yard field goal, 10:55. Cowboys 44–0. Drive: 12 plays, 39 yards, 6:29.
- USA – Maaseiah Francis 17-yard pass from Dallas Davis (Gavin Patterson kick), 4:35. Cowboys 44–7. Drive: 11 plays, 83 yards, 6:20.

Leading Passers

- OKST – Mason Rudolph – 25/38, 335 yards, 3 TD
- USA – Dallas Davis – 13/23, 126 yards, TD, INT

Leading Rushers

- OKST – J.D. King – 8 carries, 64 yards
- USA – Xavier Johnson – 5 carries, 36 yards

Leading Receivers

- OKST – James Washington – 2 receptions, 98 yards, TD
- USA – Jamarius Way – 5 receptions, 66 yards

=== At Pittsburgh ===
No. 9 Oklahoma State Cowboys at Pittsburgh Panthers – Game summary

Quarter	1	2	3	4	Total
No. 9 Cowboys	21	28	7	3	59
Panthers	0	14	7	0	21

at Heinz Field, Pittsburgh, PA

- Date: September 16
- Game time: 11:00 a.m.
- Game weather: Temperature: 75 °F (24 °C) • Weather: mostly sunny • Wind: E 2 MPH
- Game attendance: 38,952
- Referee: Cooper Castleberry
- TV announcers (ESPN): Dave Pasch (play-by-play), Greg McElroy (color), Tom Luginbill (reporter)

Game information

First quarter

- OKST – Justice Hill 20-yard run (Matt Ammendola kick), 13:00. Cowboys 7–0. Drive: 7 plays, 75 yards, 2:00.
- OKST – Dillon Stoner 54-yard pass from Mason Rudolph (Matt Ammendola kick), 7:46. Cowboys 14–0. Drive: 10 plays, 96 yards, 3:16.
- OKST – Marcell Ateman 69-yard pass from Mason Rudolph (Matt Ammendola kick), 3:33. Cowboys 21–0. Drive: 6 plays, 80 yards, 1:31.

Second quarter

- OKST – Jalen McCleskey 8-yard pass from Mason Rudolph (Matt Ammendola kick), 13:41. Cowboys 28–0. Drive: 6 plays, 54 yards, 1:14.
- OKST – Jalen McCleskey 40-yard pass from Mason Rudolph (Matt Ammendola kick), 11:22. Cowboys 35–0. Drive: 3 plays, 65 yards, 0:39.
- PITT – Chawntez Moss 5-yard run (Alex Kessman kick), 9:25. Cowboys 35–7. Drive: 4 plays, 87 yards, 1:57.
- OKST – Justice Hill 15-yard run (Matt Ammendola kick), 6:15. Cowboys 42–7. Drive: 8 plays, 82 yards, 3:10.
- OKST – Jalen McCleskey 48-yard pass from Mason Rudolph (Matt Ammendola kick), 3:40. Cowboys 49–7. Drive: 5 plays, 79 yards, 1:49.
- PITT – Rafael Araujo-Lopes 14-yard pass from Ben DiNucci (Alex Kessman kick), 0:16. Cowboys 49–14. Drive: 13 plays, 80 yards, 3:24.

Third quarter

- OKST – Justin Phillips 10-yard interception return (Matt Ammendola kick), 9:54. Cowboys 56–14. Drive: 2 plays, 3 yards, 0:43.
- PITT – Jason Pinnock 0-yard fumble return (Alex Kessman kick), 0:08. Cowboys 56–21. Drive: 4 plays, -16 yards, 2:26.

Fourth quarter

- OKST – Matt Ammendola 25-yard field goal, 10:08. Cowboys 59–21. Drive: 10 plays, 57 yards, 5:00.

Leading Passers

- OKST – Mason Rudolph – 23/32, 497 yards, 5 TD, INT
- PITT – Ben DiNucci – 13/25, 228 yards, TD, 2 INT

Leading Rushers

- OKST – Justice Hill – 11 carries, 91 yards, 2 TD
- PITT – Chawntez Moss – 12 carries, 36 yards, TD

Leading Receivers

- OKST – Jalen McCleskey – 7 receptions, 162 yards, 3 TD
- PITT – Rafael Araujo-Lopes – 6 receptions, 89 yards, TD

=== TCU ===
No. 16 TCU Horned Frogs at No. 6 Oklahoma State Cowboys – Game summary

Quarter	1	2	3	4	Total
No. 16 Horned Frogs	6	14	14	10	44
No. 6 Cowboys	7	3	7	14	31

at Boone Pickens Stadium, Stillwater, OK

- Date: September 23
- Game time: 2:30 p.m.
- Game weather: Temperatute: 90 °F (32 °C) • Weather: mostly sunny • Wind: SSE 13 MPH
- Game attendance: 56,790
- Referee: Reggie Smith
- TV announcers (ESPN): Steve Levy (play-by-play), Brian Griese (color), Todd McShay (sideline)

Game information

First quarter

- TCU – Jonathon Song 29-yard field goal, 10:46. Horned Frogs 3–0. Drive: 12 plays, 64 yards, 4:14.
- TCU – Jonathon Song 31-yard field goal, 2:45. Horned Frogs 6–0. Drive: 7 plays, 27 yards, 2:32.
- OKST – James Washington 86-yard pass from Mason Rudolph (Matt Ammendola kick), 2:15. Cowboys 7–6. Drive: 2 plays, 90 yards, 0:30.

Second quarter

- TCU – Darius Anderson 28-yard run (Jonathon Song kick), 14:28. Horned Frogs 13–7. Drive: 7 plays, 75 yards, 2:47.
- TCU – John Diarse 9-yard pass from Kenny Hill (Jonathon Songs kick), 7:15. Horned Frogs 20–7. Drive: 9 plays, 62 yards, 4:38.
- OKST – Matt Ammendola 29-yard field goal, 4:46. Horned Frogs 20–10. Drive: 11 plays, 63 yards, 2:29.

Third quarter

- TCU – Darius Anderson 6-yard run (Jonathon Song kick), 11:59. Horned Frogs 27–10, Drive: 6 plays, 42 yards, 1:54.
- OKST – Dillon Stoner 14-yard pass from Mason Rudolph (Matt Ammendola kick), 8:37. Horned Frogs 27–17. Drive: 10 plays, 78 yards, 3:22.
- TCU – Sewo Olonilua 1-yard run (Jonathon Song kick), 4:34. Horned Frogs 34–17. Drive: 9 plays, 75 yards, 4:03.

Fourth quarter

- TCU – Jonathon Song 31-yard field goal, 12:03. Horned Frogs 37–17. Drive: 11 plays, 66 yards, 5:41.
- OKST – Mason Rudolph 1-yard run (Matt Ammendola kick), 9:44. Horned Frogs 37–24. Drive: 10 plays, 79 yards, 2:19.
- OKST – Justice Hill 1-yard run (Matt Ammendola kick), 3:03. Horned Frogs 37–31. Drive: 5 plays, 47 yards, 1:24.
- TCU – Darius Anderson 42 yard run (Jonathon Song kick), 2:37. Horned Frogs 44–31. Drive: 3 plays, 48 yards, 0:26.

Leading Passers

- TCU – Kenny Hill – 22/33, 228 yards, TD, INT
- OKST – Mason Rudolph – 22/41, 398 yards, 2 TD, 2 INT

Leading Rushers

- TCU – Darius Anderson – 26 carries, 160 yards, 3 TD
- OKST – Justice Hill – 25 carries, 102 yards, TD

Leading Receivers

- TCU – Jaelan Austin – 1 reception, 43 yards
- OKST – James Washington – 6 receptions, 153 yards, TD

=== At Texas Tech ===
No. 15 Oklahoma State Cowboys at Texas Tech Red Raiders – Game summary

Quarter	1	2	3	4	Total
No. 15 Cowboys	7	14	13	7	41
Red Raiders	7	10	3	14	34

at Jones AT&T Stadium, Lubbock, TX

- Date: September 30
- Game time: 7:00 p.m.
- Game weather: Temperature: 63 °F (17 °C) • Weather: cloudy • Wind: SSE 8 MPH
- Game attendance: 60,901
- Referee: Dan Romeo
- TV announcers (FOX): Gus Johnson (play-by-play), Joel Klatt (color), Jenny Taft (reporter)

Game information

First quarter

- OKST – James Washington 14-yard pass from Mason Rudolph (Matt Ammendola kick), 11:15. Cowboys 7–0. Drive: 7 plays, 68 yards, 1:53.
- TTU – DaMarcus Fields 95-yard interception return (Michael Barden kick), 7:42. Tied 7–7. Drive: 5 plays, 51 yards, 1:44.

Second quarter

- TTU – Dylan Cantrell 3-yard pass from Nic Schimonek (Michael Barden kick), 14:14. Red Raiders 14–7. Drive: 8 plays, 80 yards, 4:16.
- OKST – Justice Hill 5-yard pass from Mason Rudolph (Matt Ammendola kick), 9:41. Tied 14–14. Drive: 11 plays, 75 yards, 4:33.
- OKST – Jalen McCleskey 4-yard pass from Mason Rudolph (Matt Ammendola kick), 3:49. Cowboys 21–14. Drive: 10 plays, 88 yards, 3:13.
- TTU – Michael Barden 24-yard field goal, 0:00. Cowboys 21–17. Drive: 11 plays, 56 yards, 3:49.

Third quarter

- OKST – Mason Rudolph 8-yard run (Matt Ammendola kick), 12:50. Cowboys 28–17. Drive: 8 plays, 75 yards, 2:10.
- OKST – Matt Ammendola 22-yard field goal, 9:40. Cowboys 31–17. Drive: 4 plays, 4 yards, 1:32.
- TTU – Michael Barden 26-yard field goal, 6:18. Cowboys 31–20. Drive: 9 plays, 64 yards, 3:22.
- OKST – Matt Ammendola 27-yard field goal, 2:55. Cowboys 34–20. Drive: 8 plays, 65 yards, 3:23.

Fourth quarter

- TTU – Justin Stockton 1-yard run (Michael Barden kick), 14:53. Cowboys 34–27. Drive: 8 plays, 70 yards, 3:02.
- TTU – Desmond Nisby 1-yard run (Michael Barden kick), 9:56. Tied 34–34. Drive: 7 plays, 51 yards, 2:53.
- OKST – Mason Rudolph 16-yard run (Matt Ammendola kick), 1:12. Cowboys 41–34. Drive: 6 plays, 79 yards, 2:09.

Leading Passers

- OKST – Mason Rudolph – 27/38, 376 yards, 3 TD, INT
- TTU – Nic Schimonek – 29/46, 330 yards, TD, INT

Leading Rushers

- OKST – Justice Hill – 30 carries, 164 yards
- TTU – Justin Stockton – 12 carries, 28 yards, TD

Leading Receivers

- OKST – James Washington – 9 receptions, 127 yards, TD
- TTU – Cameron Batson – 6 receptions, 84 yards

=== Baylor ===
Baylor Bears at No. 14 Oklahoma State Cowboys – Game summary

Quarter	1	2	3	4	Total
Bears	7	3	6	0	16
No. 14 Cowboys	7	28	10	14	59

at Boone Pickens Stadium, Stillwater, OK

- Date: October 14
- Game time: 2:30 p.m.
- Game attendance: 56,790
- TV: FS1/FBN

Game information

First quarter

- BAY – Trestan Ebner fumble recovery in end zone (Connor Martin kick), 8:23. Bears 7–0. Drive: 12 plays, 75 yards, 6:37.
- OKST – Marcell Ateman 38-yard pass from Mason Rudolph (Matt Ammendola kick), 3:06. Tied 7–7. Drive: 6 plays, 52 yards, 1:42.

Second quarter

- OKST – Jalen McCleskey 25-yard pass from Mason Rudolph (Matt Ammendola kick), 14:44. Cowboys 14–7. Drive: 6 plays, 80 yards, 1:13.
- BAY – Connor Martin 38-yard field goal, 9:18. Cowboys 14–10. Drive: 11 plays, 55 yards, 5:26.
- OKST – Justice Hill 79-yard run (Matt Ammendola kick), 8:43. Cowboys 21–10. Drive: 2 plays, 80 yards, 0:35.
- OKST – Mason Rudolph 1-yard run (Matt Ammendola kick), 5:14. Cowboys 28–10. Drive: 7 plays, 81 yards, 2:18.
- OKST – J.D. King 1-yard run (Matt Ammendola kick), 0:37. Cowboys 35–10. Drive: 8 plays, 69 yards, 2:21.

Third quarter

- BAY – Connor Martin 40-yard field goal, 11:47. Cowboys 35–13. Drive: 10 plays, 51 yards, 2:52.
- OKST – Matt Ammendola 40-yard field goal, 9:24. Cowboys 38–13. Drive: 10 plays, 52 yards, 2:23.
- BAY – Connor Martin 29-yard field goal, 6:56. Cowboys 38–16. Drive: 8 plays, 66 yards, 2:28.
- OKST – James Washington 68-yard pass from Mason Rudolph (Matt Ammendola kick), 6:24. Cowboys 45–16. Drive: 2 plays, 75 yards, 0:32.

Fourth quarter

- OKST – James Washington 2-yard run (Matt Ammendola kick), 14:55. Cowboys 52–16. Drive: 13 plays, 74 yards, 4:26.
- OKST – Taylor Cornelius 40-yard run (Matt Ammendola kick), 10:37. Cowboys 59–16. Drive: 3 plays, 59 yards, 1:27.

Leading Passers

- BAY – Zach Smith – 11/28, 127 yards, INT
- OKST – Mason Rudolph – 19/31, 459 yards, 3 TD

Leading Rushers

- BAY – Terence Williams – 10 carries, 95 yards
- OKST – Justice Hill – 14 carries, 117 yards, TD

Leading Receivers

- BAY – Tony Nicholson – 4 receptions, 57 yards
- OKST – James Washington – 6 receptions, 235 yards, TD

=== At Texas ===
No. 10 Oklahoma State Cowboys at Texas Longhorns – Game summary

Quarter	1	2	3	4	OT	Total
No. 10 Cowboys	7	0	0	3	3	13
Longhorns	0	7	3	0	0	10

at Darrell K Royal–Texas Memorial Stadium, Austin, TX

- Date: October 21
- Game time: 11:00 a.m.
- Game attendance: 92,506
- TV: ABC

Game information

First quarter

- OKST – J.D. King 7-yard run (Matt Ammendola kick), 4:51. Cowboys 7–0. Drive: 10 plays, 96 yards, 2:52.

Second quarter

- TEX – Sam Ehlinger 2-yard run (Joshua Rowland kick), 13:59. Tied 7–7. Drive: 3 plays, 86 yards, 0:50.

Third quarter

- TEX – Joshua Rowland 22-yard field goal, 10:42. Longhorns 10–7. Drive: 13 plays, 71 yards, 4:18.

Fourth quarter

- OKST – Matt Ammendola 19-yard field goal, 12:31. Tied 10–10. Drive: 12 plays, 74 yards, 4:20.

Overtime

- OKST – Matt Ammendola 34-yard field goal. Cowboys 13–10. Drive: 4 plays, 8 yards.

Leading Passers

- OKST – Mason Rudolph – 25/38, 282 yards
- TEX – Sam Ehlinger – 22/35, 241 yards, INT

Leading Rushers

- OKST – Justice Hill – 33 carries, 117 yards
- TEX – Chris Warren III – 12 carries, 33 yards

Leading Receivers

- OKST – Marcell Ateman – 4 receptions, 87 yards
- TEX – John Burt – 2 receptions, 99 yards

=== At West Virginia ===
No. 11 Oklahoma State Cowboys at No. 22 West Virginia Mountaineers – Game summary

Quarter	1	2	3	4	Total
No. 11 Cowboys	13	10	7	20	50
No. 22 Mountaineers	0	10	14	15	39

at Mountaineer Field, Morgantown, WV

- Date: October 28
- Game time: 11:00 a.m. CST
- Game attendance: 57,507
- TV: ABC

Game information

First quarter

- OKST - James Washington 13 Yd pass from Mason Rudolph (Matt Ammendola Kick), 7:20.

Cowboys 7-0. Drive: 8 plays, 51 yards, 2:50

- OKST - Mason Rudolph 1 Yd Run ( PAT failed), 1:02.

Cowboys 13-0. Drive: 14 plays, 77 yards, 5:14.

Second quarter

- WVU - Evan Staley 23 yd field goal, 13:31.

Cowboys 13-3. Drive: 8 plays, 70 yards, 2:31.

- OKST - Matt Ammendola 35 yd field goal, 7:56.

Cowboys 16-3. Drive: 13 plays, 57 yards, 5:35.

- OKST - J.D. King 20 yd run (Matt Ammendola kick), 4:46.

Cowboys 23-3. Drive: 1 play, 20 yards, 0:08.

- WVU - Kennedy McKoy 1 yard run (Evan Staley kick), 0:20.

Cowboys 23-10. Drive: 8 plays, 60 yards, 1:32.

Third quarter

- OKST - J.D. King 6 yd pass from Mason Rudolph (Matt Ammendola kick), 11:21.

Cowboys 30:10. Drive: 7 plays, 61 yards, 2:25.

- WVU - Marvin Gross jR. 0 yd return of blocked punt (Evan Staley kick), 3:55.

Cowboys 30-17. Drive: 3 plays, 0 yards, 0:53.

- WVU - Kenny Robinson 39 yd interception return (Evan Staley kick), 3:05.

Cowboys 30-24. Drive: 2 plays, 0 yards, 0:50.

Fourth quarter

- OKST - Justice Hill 5 yd run (Matt Ammendola kick), 10:38.

Cowboys 37-24. Drive: 9 plays, 48 yards, 3:42.

- OKST - James Washington 19 yd pass from Mason Rudolph (Two-Point pass conversion failed), 8:22.

Cowboys 43-24. Drive: 2 plays, 17 yards, 0:41.

- WVU - Marcus Simms 68 yd pass from Will Grier (Evan Staley kick), 7:32.

Cowboys 43-31. Drive: 3 plays, 80 yards, 0:50.

- OKST - Justice Hill 18 yd run (Matt Ammendola kick), 3:47.

Cowboys 50-31. Drive: 7 plays, 57 yards, 3:45.

- WVU - Ka’Raun White 9 yd pass from Will Grier (Will Grier pass to David Sills for Two-Point conversion), 1:25.

Cowboys 50-39. Drive: 13 plays, 75 yards, 2:22.

Leading Passers

- OKST – Mason Rudolph - 20/34, 216 yards, 3 TD, 1 INT
- WVU – Will Grier - 20/42, 285 yards, 2 TD, 4 INT

Leading Rushers

- OKST – J.D. King - 36 carries, 142 yards, 1 TD
- WVU – Justin Crawford - 13 carries, 45 yards

Leading Receivers

- OKST – James Washington - 7 receptions, 91 yards, 2 TD
- WVU – Marcus Simms - 3 receptions, 80 yards, 1 TD

=== Oklahoma ===
No. 8 Oklahoma Sooners at No. 11 Oklahoma State Cowboys – Game summary

Quarter	1	2	3	4	Total
No. 8 Sooners	14	24	10	14	62
No. 11 Cowboys	10	28	0	14	52

at Boone Pickens Stadium, Stillwater, OK

- Date: November 4
- Game time: 3:11 p.m. CDT
- Game weather: Temperature: 68 °F (20 °C) • Wind: WNW 2 MPH • Weather: Partly Cloudy
- Game attendance: 56,790
- Referee: Mike Defee
- TV announcers (FS1): Gus Johnson, Joel Klatt, Jenny Taft

Game information

First quarter

- OKST - Matt Ammendola 29 yd field goal, 12:07.

Cowboys 3-0. Drive: 6 plays, 17 yards, 1:47.

- OKLA - Dimitri Flowers 49 yd pass from Baker Mayfield (Austin Seibert kick), 9:03.

Sooners 7-3. Driver: 4 plays, 71 yards, 1:14.

- OKST - Marcell Ateman 1 yd pass from Mason Rudolph (Matt Ammendola kick), 7:01.

Cowboys 10-7. Drive: 6 plays, 75 yards, 2:02.

- OKLA - Jeff Badet 5 yd pass from Baker Mayfield (Austin Seibert kick), 4:45.

Sooners 14-10. Drive: 6 plays, 80 yards, 2:16.

Second quarter

- OKLA - Baker Mayfield 7 yd run (Austin Seibert kick), 14:53.

Sooners 21-10. Drive: 9 plays, 79 yards, 3:37.

- OKST - Justice Hill 6 yd run (Matt Ammendola kick), 14:07.

Sooners 21-17. Drive: 4 plays, 75 yards, 0:46.

- OKLA - Marquise Brown 84 yd pass from Baker Mayfield (Austin Seibert kick), 13:50.

Sooners 28-17. Drive: 1 play, 84 yards, 0:17.

- OKST - Marcell Ateman 2 yd pass from Mason Rudolph (Matt Ammendola kick), 11:09.

Sooners 28-24. Drive: 10 plays, 75 yards, 2:41.

- OKLA - Rodney Anderson 14 yd run (Austin Seibert kick), 8:12.

Sooners 35-24. Drive: 7 plays, 75 yards, 2:57.

- OKST - James Washington 35 yd pass from Mason Rudolph (Matt Ammendola kick), 7:16.

Sooners 35-31. Drive: 5 plays, 75 yards, 0:56.

- OKLA - Austin Seibert 20 yd field goal, 1:18.

Sooners 38-31. Drive: 10 plays, 74 yards, 5:58.

- OKST - Justice Hill 30 yd run (Matt Ammendola kick), 0:33.

Tied 38-38. Drive: 5 plays, 75 yards, 0:45.

Third quarter

- OKLA - Austin Seibert 36 yd field goal, 4:47.

Sooners 41-38. Drive: 4 plays, - 9 yards, 2:10.

- OKLA - Rodney Anderson 43 yd pass from Baker Mayfield (Austin Seibert kick), 0:12.

Sooners 48-38. Drive: 3 plays, 80 yards, 1:02.

Fourth quarter

- OKST - Tyron Johnson 33 yd pass from Mason Rudolph (Matt Ammendola kick), 12:30.

Sooners 48-45. Drive: 7 plays, 75 yards, 2:42.

- OKLA - Marquise Brown 77 yd pass from Baker Mayfield (Austin Seibert kick), 11:43.

Sooners 55-45. Drive: 2 plays, 77 yards, 0:47.

- OKST - Tyron Johnson 18 yd pass from Mason Rudolph (Matt Ammendola kick), 9:51.

Sooners 55-52. Drive: 9 plays, 75 yards, 1:52.

- OKLA - Trey Sermon 53 yd run (Austin Seibert kick), 0:42.

Sooners 62-52. Drive: 2 plays, 62 yards, 0:18.

Leading Passers

- OKLA – Baker Mayfield - 24/36, 598 yards, 5 TD, 2 INT
- OKST – Mason Rudolph - 28/54, 448 yards, 5 TD, 2 INT

Leading Rushers

- OKLA – Rodney Anderson - 21 carries, 111 yards, 1 TD
- OKST – Justice Hill - 30 carries, 228 yards, 2 TD

Leading Receivers

- OKLA – Marquise Brown - 9 receptions, 265 yards, 2 TD
- OKST – James Washington - 7 receptions, 128 yards, 1 TD

=== At Iowa State ===
NO. 12 Oklahoma State Cowboys at No. 24 Iowa State Cyclones – Game summary

Quarter	1	2	3	4	Total
No. 12 Cowboys	7	14	10	18	49
No. 24 Cyclones	14	7	7	14	42

at Jack Trice Stadium, Ames, IA

- Date: November 11
- Game time: 11:06 a.m. CST
- Game weather: Temperature: 40 °F (4 °C) • Wind: S 5–10 miles per hour (8.0–16.1 km/h) • Weather: Overcast
- Game attendance: 61,500
- Referee: Brad Van Vark
- TV: ABC/ESPN2

Game information

First quarter

- 10:02 ISU - Allen Lazard 14 yd TD PASS from Kyle Kempt (KICK by Garrett Owens), 11-73 4:58
- 04:52 ISU - David Montgomery 22 yd TD RUSH (KICK by Garrett Owens), 8-64 3:55
- 01:31 OSU - Marcell Ateman 21 yd TD PASS from Mason Rudolph (KICK by Matt Ammendola), 8-73 3:14

Second quarter

- 12:38 OSU - Justice Hill 9 yd TD RUSH (KICK by Matt Ammendola), 5-32 2:14
- 08:27 OSU - Justice Hill 2 yd TD RUSH (KICK by Matt Ammendola), 5-60 2:24
- 00:22 ISU - Joel Lanning 1 yd TD RUSH (KICK by Garrett Owens), 7-91 1:51

Third quarter

- 10:17 OSU - Matt Ammendola 35 yd FG 10-58 4:43
- 06:57 ISU - David Montgomery 3 yd TD RUSH (KICK by Garrett Owens), 8-71 3:15
- 01:27 OSU - Justice Hill 1 yd TD RUSH (KICK by Ammendola, Matt), 2-82 0:22

Fourth quarter

- 14:13 ISU - Allen Lazard 22 yd TD PASS from Joel Lanning (KICK by Garrett Owens), 5-72 2:06
- 09:43 OSU - Matt Ammendola 41 yd FG 10-52 4:30
- 08:38 ISU - David Montgomery 4 yd TD RUSH (KICK by Garrett Owens), 4-75 1:05
- 05:55 OSU - Marcell Ateman 30 yd TD PASS from Mason Rudolph (RUSH by Justice Hill), 7-75 2:43
- 03:47 OSU - Dillon Stoner 19 yd TD PASS from Mason Rudolph (KICK by Matt Ammendola), 3-51 1:14

Leading Passers

- OKST – Mason Rudolph - 25/31, 376 yards, 3 TD
- ISU – Zeb Noland - 17/28, 263 yards, 1 INT

Leading Rushers

- OKST – Justice Hill - 25 carries, 134 yards, 3 TD
- ISU – David Montgomery - 21 carries, 105 yards, 3 TD

Leading Receivers

- OKST – Jalen McCleskey - 5 receptions, 109 yards
- ISU – Allen Lazard - 9 receptions, 126 yards, 2 TD

Leading Tacklers

- OKST – Rodarius Williams – 9 tackles
- ISU – Kamari Cotton-Moya – 9 tackles

=== Kansas State ===
Kansas State Wildcats at No. 10 Oklahoma State Cowboys – Game summary

Quarter	1	2	3	4	Total
Wildcats	7	21	14	3	45
No. 10 Cowboys	10	3	7	20	40

at Boone Pickens Stadium, Stillwater, OK

- Date: November 18
- Game time: 2:30 p.m.
- Game attendance: 56,790
- TV: ESPN2

Game information

First quarter

Second quarter

Third quarter

Fourth quarter

Leading Passers

- KSU – Skylar Thompson - 10/13, 204 yards, 3 TD
- OKST – Mason Rudolph - 32/53, 425 yards, 3 TD, 2 INT

Leading Rushers

- KSU – Skylar Thompson - 17 carries, 93 yards, 1 TD
- OKST – Justice Hill - 23 carries, 91 yards, 1 TD

Leading Receivers

- KSU – Byron Pringle - 4 receptions, 166 yards, 3 TD
- OKST – James Washington - 8 receptions, 159 yards, 2 TD

=== Kansas ===
Kansas Jayhawks at No. 18 Oklahoma State Cowboys – Game summary

Quarter	1	2	3	4	Total
Jayhawks	3	7	7	0	17
No. 18 Cowboys	10	24	14	10	58

at Boone Pickens Stadium, Stillwater, OK

- Date: November 25
- Game time: 11:00 a.m.
- Game attendance: 56,790
- TV: FS1

Game information

First quarter

Second quarter

Third quarter

Fourth quarter

Leading Passers

- KU –
- OKST –

Leading Rushers

- KU –
- OKST –

Leading Receivers

- KU –
- OKST –

=== Virginia Tech ===
2017 Camping World Bowl – Game summary

Quarter	1	2	3	4	Total
No. 22 Hokies	7	7	0	7	21
No. 19 Cowboys	3	10	14	3	30

at Camping World Stadium, Orlando, FL

- Date: December 28
- Game time: 4:15 p.m. CST
- Game attendance: 39,610
- Referee: John O'Neill
- TV announcers (ESPN): Beth Mowins, Anthony Becht and Rocky Boiman

Game information

First quarter

- (12:17) OKST – Matt Ammendola 31-yard field goal (Drive: 9 plays, 61 yards, 2:43; Oklahoma State 3–0)
- (7:59) VT – Josh Jackson 76-yard run, Joey Slye kick (Drive: 8 plays, 76 yards, 4:48; Virginia Tech 7–3)

Second quarter

- (7:28) OKST – Matt Ammendola 36-yard field goal (Drive: 9 plays, 69 yards, 3:12; Virginia Tech 7–6)
- (0:45) OKST – Justice Hill 1-yard run, Matt Ammendola kick (Drive: 4 plays, 81 yards, 0:39; Oklahoma State 13–7)

Third quarter

- (11:22) OKST – Dillon Stoner 17-yard reception from Mason Rudolph, Matt Ammendola kick (Drive: 8 plays, 79 yards, 2:25; Oklahoma State 20–7)
- (6:31) VT – Eric Kumah 9-yard reception from Josh Jackson, Joey Slye kick (Drive: 9 plays, 79 yards, 4:51; Oklahoma State 20–14)
- (5:37) OKST – James Washington 65-yard reception from Mason Rudolph, Matt Ammendola kick (Drive: 4 plays, 76 yards, 0:54; Oklahoma State 27–14)

Fourth quarter

- (5:40) VT – Josh Jackson 5-yard run, Joey Slye kick (Drive: 7 plays, 61 yards, 1:06; Oklahoma State 27–21)
- (2:34) OKST – Matt Ammendola 38-yard field goal (Drive: 10 plays, 54 yards, 3:06; Oklahoma State 30–21)

Leading Passers

- VT – Josh Jackson – 22/41, 248 yards, TD, INT
- OKST – Mason Rudolph – 21/32, 352 yards, 2 TD

Leading Rushers

- VT – Deshawn McClease – 18 carries, 124 yards
- OKST – Justice Hill – 23 carries, 120 yards, TD

Leading Receivers

- VT – Eric Kumah – 5 receptions, 72 yards, TD
- OKST – James Washington – 5 receptions, 126 yards, TD

== Rankings ==
Ranking movements Legend: ██ Increase in ranking ██ Decrease in ranking
	Week															
Poll	Pre	1	2	3	4	5	6	7	8	9	10	11	12	13	14	Final
AP	10	11	9	6	15	15	14	10	11	11	12	10	18	18	17	14
Coaches	11	10	8	7	14	14	14	11	12	11	15	13	21	18	17	14
CFP	Not released									11	15	13	19	19	19	Not released

== Roster ==
2017 Oklahoma State Cowboys football team roster
Players
Coaches
Offense

Pos.	#	Name	Class
WR	1	Jalen McCleskey	Jr
QB	2	Mason Rudolph	Sr
WR	3	Marcell Ateman	RSr
QB	4	Tracin Wallace	Fr
RB	5	Justice Hill	So
TE	6	Keenen Brown	RJr
WR	8	Braydon Johnson	Fr
QB	9	John Kolar	RSo
WR	10	Tyrell Alexander	RFr
QB	11	Keondre Wudtee	RFr
QB	12	Ryan Sherry	Fr
WR	13	Tyron Johnson	RSo
QB	14	Taylor Cornelius	RJr
WR	15	Chris Lacy	Sr
WR	17	Dillon Stoner	RFr
QB	18	Jelani Woods	Fr
RB	22	Ja'Ron Wilson	RFr
RB	24	LD Brown	RFr
WR	25	Cole McKnight	RSr
RB	27	J.D. King	Fr
WR	28	James Washington	Sr
RB	30	Chuba Hubbard	Fr
WR	36	Rhett Boles	Fr
WR	38	Gunner Hudson	Fr
TE	40	Luke Hupp	RJr
TE	41	Britton Abbott	RJr
TE	42	Sione Finefeuiaki	Jr
TE	44	Ethan Garner	Fr
TE	47	Tyler Ferguson	RJr
TE	48	Dawson Bassett	RSr
OL	50	Ry Schneider	RFr
OL	51	Arlington Hambright	Jr
OL	56	Larry Williams	RSr
OL	57	Walker Reed	RFr
OL	58	Brett Wilson	RSo
OL	60	Zachary Crabtree	RSr
OL	62	Jacob Clark	RFr
OL	65	Matt McClurg	Fr
OL	66	Lemaefe Galea'i	RJr
OL	67	Shane Richards	Sr
OL	68	Deionte Noel	RJr
OL	69	Bailey Wilhite	Fr
OL	71	Brad Lundblade	Sr
OL	72	Johnny Wilson	RSo
OL	73	Teven Jenkins	RFr
OL	74	Larry Joubert	Jr
OL	75	Marcus Keyes	RSo
OL	76	Dylan Galloway	RFr
OL	77	Tyler Moore	Jr
OL	78	Aaron Cochran	RSr
OL	79	Matt Kegel	RFr
WR	80	Tylan Wallace	Fr
WR	81	LC Greenwood	Fr
WR	82	Anthony Love	Fr
WR	83	Korie Frausto	RFr
TE	84	Dayton Metcalf	RFr
WR	85	Patrick McKaufman	So
TE	86	Baron Odom	Fr
TE	87	Logan Carter	RFr
WR	88	Landon Wolf	RFr
WR	89	Austin Parker	RJr

Defense

Pos.	#	Name	Class
LB	1	Calvin Bundage	So
S	2	Darius Curry	RSr
LB	3	Kenneth Edison-McGruder	Jr
CB	4	A.J. Green	So
S	5	Jerel Morrow	RSr
CB	6	Adrian Baker	RSr
S	7	Ramon Richards	Sr
CB	8	Rodarius Williams	RFr
LB	9	Gyasi Akem	Sr
LB	11	Amen Ogbongbemiga	RFr
LB	12	Kirk Tucker	Sr
CB	13	Lamarcus Morton	Fr
CB	14	Bryce Balous	RSo
LB	16	Devin Harper	RFr
S	18	Za'Carrius Green	RSo
LB	19	Justin Phillips	RJr
S	20	Malcolm Rodriguez	Fr
CB	22	Taoheed Karim	Fr
DB	23	Trey Sterling	Fr
CB	24	Malik Kearse	Sr
CB	25	Madre Harper	So
S	28	Thabo Mwaniki	Fr
CB	29	Bryce Brown	RSo
S	31	Tre Flowers	RSr
S	32	Kris McCune	Fr
LB	33	Kevin Henry	RSo
S	35	Chance Cook	So
CB	37	Javarus Barksdale-Blair	RFr
S	38	Philip Redwine-Bryant	RSo
DE	40	Brock Martin	Fr
LB	44	Patrick Macon	Jr
LB	45	Chad Whitener	RSr
LB	46	Mike Coats	Fr
DT	54	Latu Maile	So
DT	56	Enoch Smith Jr.	RJr
DT	70	Ben Hughes	RSr
DT	79	Darrion Daniels	Jr
DE	82	Cole Walterscheid	RJr
DE	86	Triston Grant	RFr
DE	89	Tralund Webber	Sr
DT	90	Taaj Bakari	RSo
DT	91	DeQuinton Osborne	RSr
DT	92	Cameron Murray	RFr
DE	93	Jarrell Owens	RJr
DE	94	Jordan Brailford	RJr
DE	95	Vili Leveni	RSr
DT	98	Brendon Evers	Fr
DE	99	Trey Carter	RJr

Special teams

Pos.	#	Name	Class
K	19	Jovi Munoz	Fr
P	29	Zach Sinor	RJr
K	39	Jake McClure	Fr
K	49	Matt Ammendola	RSo
LS	52	Tanner Morgan	So
LS	53	Matt Hembrough	Fr
P	59	Matt Hockett	RJr
LS	63	Sam Walkingstick	RSo

Head coach

- Mike Gundy

Coordinators/assistant coaches

- Glenn Spencer – Defensive Coordinator / Linebackers
- Mike Yurcich – Offensive Coordinator / Quarterbacks
- Joe Bob Clements – Defensive Line
- Tim Duffie – Corners
- Kasey Dunn – Receivers
- Dan Hammerschmidt – Safeties
- Josh Henson – Offensive Line
- Jason McEndoo – Tight Ends / Cowboy Backs
- John Wozniak – Running Backs
- Bill Clay – Defensive Analyst
- Rob Glass – Strength & Conditioning
- Mack Butler – Director of Football Operations
- Johnny Barr – Director of Football Recruiting
- Mike Groce – Assistant Director of Football Recruiting
- Rod Johnson – Assistant Director of Operations
- Beni Tonga – Player Development Specialist

Legend

- (C) Team captain
- (S) Suspended
- (I) Ineligible
- Injured
- Redshirt

Roster
