= 2017 Virginia Tech Hokies football team =

American college football season

2017 Virginia Tech Hokies football

Camping World Bowl, L 21–30 vs. Oklahoma State
- Conference: Atlantic Coast Conference
- Coastal Division

Ranking
- Coaches: No. 25
- AP: No. 24
- Record: 9–4 (5–3 ACC)
- Head coach: Justin Fuente (2nd season)
- Offensive coordinator: Brad Cornelsen (2nd season)
- Offensive scheme: Spread
- Defensive coordinator: Bud Foster (23rd season)
- Base defense: 4–4
- Home stadium: Lane Stadium

Uniform
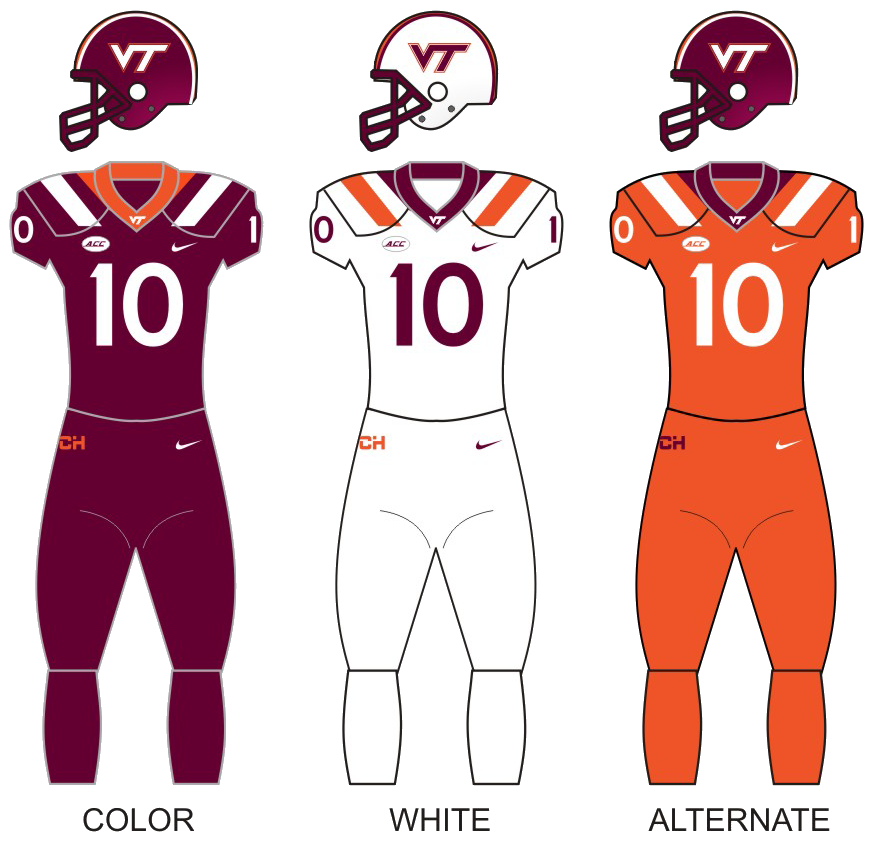

2017 Atlantic Coast Conference football standings
	Conf.			Overall
Team	W		L	W		L
Atlantic Division
No. 4 Clemson xy$^	7	–	1	12	–	2
No. 23 NC State	6	–	2	9	–	4
Wake Forest	4	–	4	8	–	5
Louisville	4	–	4	8	–	5
Boston College	4	–	4	7	–	6
Florida State	3	–	5	7	–	6
Syracuse	2	–	6	4	–	8
Coastal Division
No. 13 Miami (FL) xy	7	–	1	10	–	3
No. 24 Virginia Tech	5	–	3	9	–	4
Georgia Tech	4	–	4	5	–	6
Virginia	3	–	5	6	–	7
Pittsburgh	3	–	5	5	–	7
Duke	3	–	5	7	–	6
North Carolina	1	–	7	3	–	9
Championship: Clemson 38, Miami 3
^ – College Football Playoff participant; $ – Conference champion; x – Division champion/co-champions; y – Championship game participant; Rankings from AP Poll

The 2017 Virginia Tech Hokies football team represented Virginia Polytechnic Institute and State University during the 2017 NCAA Division I FBS football season. The Hokies were led by second-year head coach Justin Fuente and played their home games at Lane Stadium in Blacksburg, Virginia. Virginia Tech competed as members of the Coastal Division of the Atlantic Coast Conference. They finished the season 9–4, 5–3 in ACC play to finish in second place in the Coastal Division. They were invited to the Camping World Bowl where they lost to Oklahoma State.

== Coaching staff ==
Name	Title	Joined Staff
Justin Fuente	Head Coach	2016
Bud Foster	Associate head coach, Defensive coordinator & Linbeackers	1987
Galen Scott	Assistant Head Coach & Safeties	2016
Zohn Burden	Running Backs	2015
Brad Cornelsen	Offensive coordinator, Quarterbacks	2016
Brian Mitchell	Cornerbacks	2016
James Shibest	Special Teams Coordinator, Tight Ends	2016
Vance Vice	Offensive Line	2016
Holmon Wiggins	Wide Receivers	2016
Charley Wiles	Defensive Line	1996

== Schedule ==
Date	Time	Opponent	Rank	Site	TV	Result	Attendance
September 3	7:30 p.m.	vs. No. 22 West Virginia*	No. 21	FedExField; Landover, MD (Black Diamond Trophy)	ABC	W 31–24	67,489
September 9	3:30 p.m.	Delaware*	No. 18	Lane Stadium; Blacksburg, VA	ACCN Extra	W 27–0	62,526
September 16	3:30 p.m.	at East Carolina*	No. 16	Dowdy–Ficklen Stadium; Greenville, NC	CBSSN	W 64–17	43,776
September 23	2:00 p.m.	Old Dominion*	No. 13	Lane Stadium; Blacksburg, VA	ACCN Extra	W 38–0	65,632
September 30	8:00 p.m.	No. 2 Clemson	No. 12	Lane Stadium; Blacksburg, VA (College GameDay)	ABC	L 17–31	65,632
October 7	7:15 p.m.	at Boston College	No. 16	Alumni Stadium; Chestnut Hill, MA (rivalry)	ESPN2	W 23–10	32,057
October 21	3:30 p.m.	North Carolina^{†}	No. 14	Lane Stadium; Blacksburg, VA	ESPN2	W 59–7	65,632
October 28	7:20 p.m.	Duke	No. 13	Lane Stadium; Blacksburg, VA	ACCN	W 24–3	60,914
November 4	8:00 p.m.	at No. 10 Miami (FL)	No. 13	Hard Rock Stadium; Miami Gardens, FL (rivalry)	ABC	L 10–28	63,932
November 11	12:20 p.m.	at Georgia Tech	No. 17	Bobby Dodd Stadium; Atlanta, GA (rivalry)	ACCN	L 22–28	47,909
November 18	12:20 p.m.	Pittsburgh		Lane Stadium; Blacksburg, VA	ACCN	W 20–14	58,948
November 24	8:00 p.m.	at Virginia	No. 25	Scott Stadium; Charlottesville, VA (Commonwealth Cup)	ESPN	W 10–0	48,609
December 28	5:15 p.m.	vs. No. 19 Oklahoma State*	No. 22	Camping World Stadium; Orlando, FL (Camping World Bowl)	ESPN	L 21–30	39,610
*Non-conference game; ^{†}Homecoming; Rankings from AP Poll and CFP Rankings after October 31 released prior to game; All times are in Eastern time

Schedule source

== Game summaries ==
=== vs West Virginia ===
Virginia Tech vs West Virginia

Team	1	2	3	4	Total
• No. 21 Virginia Tech	3	7	14	7	31
No. 22 West Virginia	0	7	10	7	24

- Date: September 4
- Location:
  FedEx Field
  Washington, D.C.
- Game start: 7:40pm
- Elapsed time: 3:46
- Game attendance: 67,489
- Game weather: 70 °F (21 °C), Wind: 5 MPH N, Clear
- Referee: Jerry McGinn
- TV announcers (ABC): Steve Levy (Play-by-Play), Brian Griese (Analyst)

Scoring summary
Q1	6:10	VT	Joey Slye 25-yard field goal	3–0 VT
Q2	5:37	WV	David Sills 11-yard pass from Will Grier (Mike Molina kick)	7–3 WV
Q2	0:27	VT	Josh Jackson 5-yard run (Joey Slye kick)	10–7 VT
Q3	11:25	WV	Mike Molina 34-yard field goal	10–10
Q3	9:51	VT	Deshawn McClease 12-yard run (Joey Slye kick)	17–10 VT
Q3	2:18	WV	David Sills 10-yard pass from Will Grier (Mike Molina kick)	17–17
Q3	2:02	VT	Cam Phillips 32-yard pass from Josh Jackson (Joey Slye kick)	24–17 VT
Q4	12:37	WV	Gary Jennings Jr. 60-yard pass from Will Grier (Mike Molina kick)	24–24
Q4	6:30	VT	Travon McMillian 3-yard run (Joey Slye kick)	31–24 VT

In the first game of the season at FedExField in Landover, Maryland, Hokies quarterback Josh Jackson ran for a touchdown and threw another as the Hokies held off No. 22-ranked West Virginia 31–24. In the 52nd meeting between the two schools, a back-and-forth matchup was decided in the fourth quarter when Jackson rushed for a 46-yard gain to set up Travon McMillion's three-yard touchdown run with 6:30 left in the game. The Hokie defense, which gave up 592 total yards to the Mountaineers, came up big at the end, keeping West Virginia out of the endzone after two attempts from the 15-yard line as time expired. The win moved the Hokies to 1–0 on the season.

=== Delaware ===
Delaware at Virginia Tech

Team	1	2	3	4	Total
Delaware	0	0	0	0	0
• No. 18 Virginia Tech	7	10	0	10	27

- Date: September 9
- Location:
  Lane Stadium
  Blacksburg, Virginia
- Game start: 3:35 pm
- Elapsed time: 2:52
- Game attendance: 62,526
- Game weather: 68 °F (20 °C), Wind: 3 MPH NE, Mostly cloudy
- Referee: Duane Heydt
- Television network: ACCN Extra

Scoring summary
Q1	2:45	VT	Greg Stroman 61-yard punt return (Joey Slye kick)	7–0 VT
Q2	7:48	VT	Joey Slye 50-yard field goal	10–0 VT
Q2	2:01	VT	Travon McMillian 4-yard pass from Josh Jackson (Joey Slye kick)	17–0 VT
Q4	11:50	VT	Cam Phillips 28-yard pass from Josh Jackson (Joey Slye kick)	24–0 VT
Q4	8:59	VT	Joey Slye 24-yard field goal	27–0 VT

The Hokies announced they would wear new "white Hokie stone" helmets for their first home game of the year against FCS Delaware. After allowing nearly 600 yards to West Virginia, Virginia Tech's defense rebounded nicely to record Bud Foster's 32nd shutout as the Hokies' defensive coordinator. The Blue Hens only got into Virginia Tech territory three times. Another Hokie hallmark, special teams, played an important role as Greg Stroman returned a punt for a touchdown late in the first quarter to give the Hokies a 7–0 lead. Quarterback Josh Jackson threw two scoring passes in the game as the Hokies were held to only 303 yards of total offense. However, it was enough as the Hokies moved to 2–0 on the season with a 27–0 win.

=== At East Carolina ===
Virginia Tech at East Carolina

Team	1	2	3	4	Total
• No. 16 Virginia Tech	7	16	34	7	64
East Carolina	17	0	0	0	17

- Date: September 16
- Location:
  Dowdy–Ficklen Stadium
  Greenville, North Carolina
- Game start: 3:37 pm
- Elapsed time: 3:23
- Game attendance: 43,776
- Game weather: 75 °F (24 °C), Wind: 7 MPH NE, Partly cloudy
- Referee: Adam Savoie
- TV announcers (CBSSN): Dave Ryan (Play-by-Play), Corey Chavous Analyst)

Scoring summary
Q1	12:53	ECU	Davon Grayson 9-yard pass from Gardiner Minshew (Jake Verity kick)	7–0 ECU
Q1	8:44	VT	Steven Peoples 1-yard Run (Joey Slye Kick)	7–7
Q1	7:55	ECU	Trevon Brown 76-yard pass from Gardner Minshew (Jake Verity Kick)	14–7 ECU
Q1	2:34	ECU	Jake Verity 35-yard field goal	17–7 ECU
Q2	13:11	VT	Cam Phillips 10 Yd pass from Josh Jackson (Joey Slye Kick)	17–14 ECU
Q2	8:36	VT	Joey Slye 25-yard field goal	17–17
Q2	2:07	VT	Joey Slye 34-yard field goal	20–17 VT
Q2	0:43	VT	Joey Slye 37-yard field goal	23–17 VT
Q3	12:53	VT	Cam Phillips 31-yard pass from Josh Jackson (Two-Point Pass Conversion Failed)	29–17 VT
Q3	11:54	VT	Travon McMillian 70-yard pass from Josh Jackson (Joey Slye Kick)	36–17 VT
Q3	7:46	VT	Cam Phillips 45-yard pass from Josh Jackson (Joey Slye Kick)	43–17 VT
Q3	5:54	VT	Sean Savoy 9-yard pass from Josh Jackson (Joey Slye Kick)	50–17 VT
Q3	0:40	VT	Jalen Holston 1-yard Run (Joey Slye Kick)	57–17 VT
Q4	6:50	VT	Coleman Fox 5-yard Run (Brian Johnson Kick)	64–17 VT

Virginia Tech traveled to Greenville, North Carolina to take on East Carolina in a non-conference game. Things did not start well for the Hokies as the Pirates took an early 7–0 and then 17–7 lead as the first quarter ended. VT responded quickly thereafter, getting a touchdown catch from Cam Phillips and three Joey Slye field goals in the second quarter to take the lead at the half 23–17. In the second half the Hokies ran away with the game scoring five touchdowns in the third quarter to take a 57–17 lead. Four of the third quarter touchdowns were passes from quarterback Josh Jackson. Another touchdown in the fourth quarter gave the Hokies a 64–17 win over East Carolina.

The Hokies rushed for 287 yards and Jackson passed for 388 yards and five touchdowns in the blowout. Phillips set a school record with 14 catches for 189 yards in the game. Meanwhile, the Hokie defense held the Pirates to only 281 total yards. The win moved the Hokies to 3–0 on the season.

=== Old Dominion ===
Old Dominion at Virginia Tech

Team	1	2	3	4	Total
Old Dominion	0	0	0	0	0
• No. 13 Virginia Tech	3	14	14	7	38

- Date: September 23
- Location:
  Lane Stadium
  Blacksburg, Virginia
- Game start: 2:05 pm
- Elapsed time: 3:01
- Game attendance: 65,632
- Game weather: 82 °F (28 °C), Wind: 6 MPH SSE, Clear
- Referee: Tra Blake

Scoring summary
Q1	5:29	VT	Joey Slye 31-yard field goal	3–0 VT
Q2	6:07	VT	Steven Peoples 17-yard pass from Josh Jackson (Joey Slye kick)	10–0 VT
Q2	0:40	VT	Steven Peoples 1-yard run (Joey Slye kick)	17–0 VT
Q3	13:48	VT	Steven Peoples 43-yard pass from Josh Jackson (Joey Slye kick)	24–0 VT
Q3	8:06	VT	C.J. Carroll 5-yard pass from Josh Jackson (Joey Slye kick)	31–0 VT
Q4	13:31	VT	Deshawn McClease 5-yard run (Joey Slye kick)	38–0 VT

=== Clemson ===
Clemson at Virginia Tech

Team	1	2	3	4	Total
• No. 2 Clemson	10	7	7	7	31
No. 12 Virginia Tech	0	3	0	14	17

- Date: September 30
- Location:
  Lane Stadium
  Blacksburg, Virginia
- Game start: 8:21 pm
- Elapsed time: 3:15
- Game attendance: 65,632
- Game weather: 61 °F (16 °C), Wind: 10 MPH ENE, Clear
- Referee: Jeff Heaser

Scoring summary
Q1	9:54	CU	Alex Spence 23-yard field goal	0–3 CU
Q1	6:48	CU	Tavien Feaster 60-yard pass from Kelly Bryant (Alex Spence kick)	0–10 CU
Q2	3:10	VT	Joey Slye 43-yard field goal	3–10 VT
Q2	1:19	CU	C.J. Fuller 1-yard run (Alex Spence kick)	3–17 CU
Q3	7:12	CU	Tavien Feaster 1-yard run (Alex Spence kick)	3–24 CU
Q4	14:00	VT	Sean Savoy 2-yard run (Joey Slye kick)	10–24 VT
Q4	11:08	CU	Dorian O'Daniel 22-yard Interception Return (Alex Spence kick)	10–31 CU
Q4	1:32	VT	Sean Savoy 30-yard pass from Josh Jackson (Joey Slye kick)	17–31 VT

=== At Boston College ===
Virginia Tech at Boston College

Team	1	2	3	4	Total
• No. 16 Virginia Tech	7	10	3	3	23
Boston College	3	0	0	7	10

- Date: October 7
- Location:
  Alumni Stadium
  Chestnut Hill, MA
- Game start: 7:15
- Elapsed time: 3:17
- Game attendance: 32,057
- Game weather: 73 °F (23 °C), Wind: 14s, Clear
- Referee: J Magallanes

Scoring summary
Q1	8:26	VT	Sean Savoy 53-yard pass from Josh Jackson (Joey Slye kick)	0–7 VT
Q1	5:24	BC	C.Lichtenberg 37-yard field goal	3–7 BC
Q2	11:38	VT	Joey Slye 34-yard field goal	3–10 VT
Q2	6:19	VT	Travon McMillian 23-yard run (Joey Slye kick)	3–17 VT
Q3	10:44	VT	Joey Slye 29-yard field goal	3–20 VT
Q4	6:40	VT	Joey Slye 26-yard field goal	3–23 VT
Q4	5:38	BC	Anthony Brown 25-yard pass from J.Smith (C. Lichtenberg kick)	10–23 BC

=== North Carolina ===
North Carolina at Virginia Tech

Team	1	2	3	4	Total
North Carolina	0	0	0	7	7
• No. 14 Virginia Tech	14	21	17	7	59

- Date: October 21
- Location:
  Lane Stadium
  Blacksburg, Virginia
- Game start: 3:35
- Elapsed time: 3:18
- Game attendance: 65,632
- Game weather: 74 °F (23 °C), Wind: 4 MPH S, Clear
- Referee: Garry Patterson

Scoring summary
Q1	4:53	VT	Ricky Walker 12-yard fumble return (Joey Slye kick)	7–0 VT
Q1	2:32	VT	Greg Stroman 91-yard punt return (Joey Slye kick)	14–0 VT
Q2	5:33	VT	Travon McMillian 4-yard pass from Josh Jackson (Joey Slye kick)	21–0 VT
Q2	1:49	VT	Reggie Floyd 69-yard interception return (Joey Slye kick)	28–0 VT
Q2	0:05	VT	Eric Kumah 8-yard pass from Josh Jackson (Joey Slye kick)	35–0 VT
Q3	12:40	VT	Cam Phillips 8-yard pass from Josh Jackson (Joey Slye kick)	42–0 VT
Q3	10:01	VT	Joey Slye 37-yard field goal	45–0 VT
Q3	3:01	VT	Samuel Denmark 16-yard pass from AJ Bush (Joey Slye kick)	52–0 VT
Q4	14:05	NC	Anthony Ratliff 43-yard pass from Chazz Surratt (Freeman Jones kick)	52–7 VT
Q4	7:01	VT	Jalen Holston 1-yard run (Brian Johnson kick)	59–7 BC

=== Duke ===
	1	2	3	4	Total
Blue Devils	0	3	0	0	3
No. 13 Hokies	7	10	7	0	24

=== At Miami (FL) ===
	1	2	3	4	Total
No. 13 Hokies	0	3	7	0	10
No. 9 Hurricanes	0	14	7	7	28

=== At Georgia Tech ===
	1	2	3	4	Total
No. 17 Hokies	3	6	7	6	22
Yellow Jackets	7	7	7	7	28

=== Pittsburgh ===
	1	2	3	4	Total
Panthers	7	0	0	7	14
Hokies	7	3	0	10	20

=== At Virginia ===
	1	2	3	4	Total
No. 24 Hokies	0	3	7	0	10
Cavaliers	0	0	0	0	0

=== Vs. Oklahoma State-Camping World Bowl ===
	1	2	3	4	Total
No. 22 Hokies	7	0	7	7	21
No. 19 Cowboys	3	10	14	3	30

== Honorary #25 Beamer Jersey ==
Since the start of the 2016 season, two days prior to each game, Head Coach Justin Fuente has selected an outstanding special teams player to wear the #25 jersey in honor of former head coach, Frank Beamer, who wore #25 as a player for Virginia Tech.

The players honored in the 2017 season are:

Game	Opponent	Player
Game 1	West Virginia	Anthony Shegog (2)
Game 2	Delaware	Colton Taylor
Game 3	East Carolina	Greg Stroman (2)
Game 4	Old Dominion	Deon Newsome
Game 5	Clemson	Terrell Edmunds (2)
Game 6	Boston College	Greg Stroman (3)
Game 7	North Carolina	Oscar Bradburn (Fr)
Game 8	Duke	Ricky Walker
Game 9	Miami	Sean Huelskamp (2)
Game 10	Georgia Tech	Tremaine Edmunds
Game 11	Pittsburgh	Andrew Motuapuaka
Game 12	Virginia	Jovonn Quillen
Camping World Bowl	Oklahoma State	Andrew Motuapuaka (2)

== 2018 NFL draft ==
The Hokies had five players selected in the 2018 NFL draft. The Edmunds brothers were both selected in the first round.

Player	Team	Round	Pick #	Position
Tremaine Edmunds	Buffalo Bills	1st	16th	LB
Terrell Edmunds	Pittsburgh Steelers	1st	28th	S
Tim Settle	Washington Redskins	5th	163rd	NT
Wyatt Teller	Buffalo Bills	5th	166th	G
Greg Stroman	Washington Redskins	7th	241st	CB

== Rankings ==
Ranking movements Legend: ██ Increase in ranking ██ Decrease in ranking — = Not ranked RV = Received votes
	Week															
Poll	Pre	1	2	3	4	5	6	7	8	9	10	11	12	13	14	Final
AP	21	18	16	13	12	16	15	14	13	13	17	RV	24	22	22	24
Coaches	22	18	16	13	12	19	17	14	13	13	17	RV	25	21	22	25
CFP	Not released									13	17	—	25	22	22	Not released
