= 2017 Duke Blue Devils football team =

American college football season

2017 Duke Blue Devils football

Quick Lane Bowl champion

Quick Lane Bowl, W 36–14 vs. Northern Illinois
- Conference: Atlantic Coast Conference
- Coastal Division
- Record: 7–6 (3–5 ACC)
- Head coach: David Cutcliffe (10th season)
- Offensive coordinator: Zac Roper (2nd season)
- Offensive scheme: Multiple
- Defensive coordinator: Jim Knowles (8th season)
- Base defense: 4–2–5
- MVP: Joe Giles-Harris
- Captains: Austin Davis; Bryon Fields Jr.; Daniel Jones; Mike Ramsay
- Home stadium: Wallace Wade Stadium

Uniform
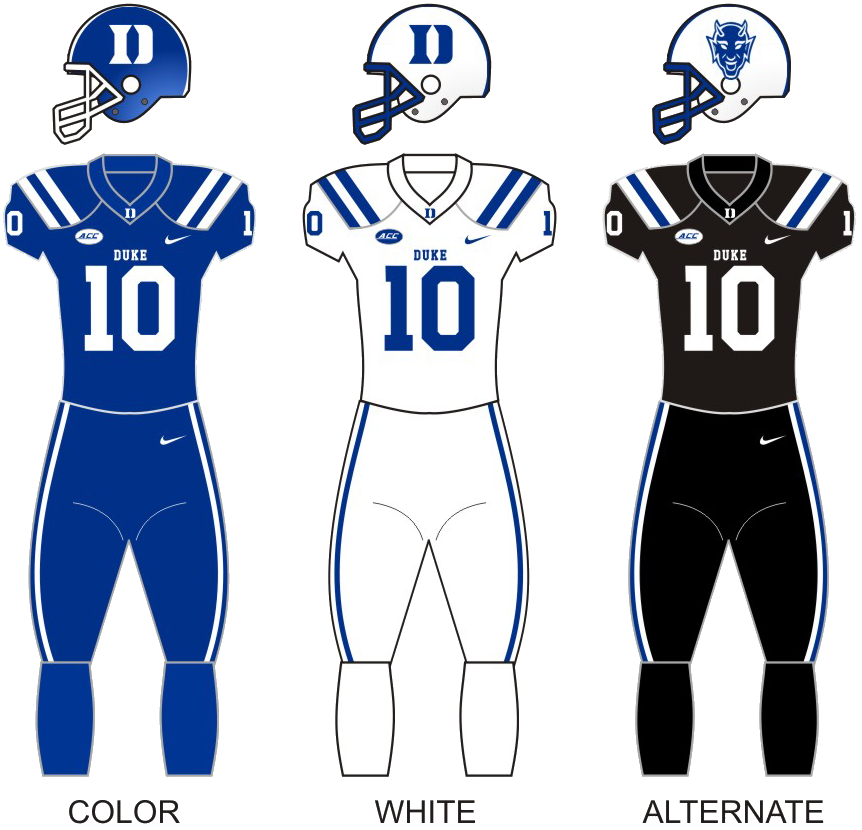

2017 Atlantic Coast Conference football standings
	Conf.			Overall
Team	W		L	W		L
Atlantic Division
No. 4 Clemson xy$^	7	–	1	12	–	2
No. 23 NC State	6	–	2	9	–	4
Wake Forest	4	–	4	8	–	5
Louisville	4	–	4	8	–	5
Boston College	4	–	4	7	–	6
Florida State	3	–	5	7	–	6
Syracuse	2	–	6	4	–	8
Coastal Division
No. 13 Miami (FL) xy	7	–	1	10	–	3
No. 24 Virginia Tech	5	–	3	9	–	4
Georgia Tech	4	–	4	5	–	6
Virginia	3	–	5	6	–	7
Pittsburgh	3	–	5	5	–	7
Duke	3	–	5	7	–	6
North Carolina	1	–	7	3	–	9
Championship: Clemson 38, Miami 3
^ – College Football Playoff participant; $ – Conference champion; x – Division champion/co-champions; y – Championship game participant; Rankings from AP Poll

The 2017 Duke Blue Devils football team represented Duke University in the 2017 NCAA Division I FBS football season as a member of the Atlantic Coast Conference (ACC) in the Coastal Division. The team was led by head coach David Cutcliffe, in his tenth year, and played its home games at Wallace Wade Stadium in Durham, North Carolina. They finished the season 7–6 overall and 3–5 in ACC play to place in a three-way tie for fourth in the Coastal Division. They were invited to the Quick Lane Bowl, where they defeated Northern Illinois.

== Schedule ==
Date	Time	Opponent	Site	TV	Result	Attendance
September 2	6:00 p.m.	North Carolina Central*	Wallace Wade Stadium; Durham, NC	ACCN Extra	W 60–7	30,477
September 9	12:00 p.m.	Northwestern*	Wallace Wade Stadium; Durham, NC	ESPNU	W 41–17	20,241
September 16	12:30 p.m.	Baylor*^{†}	Wallace Wade Stadium; Durham, NC	ACCRSN	W 34–20	26,714
September 23	3:30 p.m.	at North Carolina	Kenan Memorial Stadium; Chapel Hill, NC (Victory Bell)	ESPNU	W 27–17	59,000
September 29	7:00 p.m.	No. 14 Miami (FL)	Wallace Wade Stadium; Durham, NC	ESPN	L 6–31	36,314
October 7	12:20 p.m.	at Virginia	Scott Stadium; Charlottesville, VA	ACCN	L 21–28	38,638
October 14	12:00 p.m.	Florida State	Wallace Wade Stadium; Durham, NC	ESPN2	L 10–17	31,073
October 21	12:20 p.m.	Pittsburgh	Wallace Wade Stadium; Durham, NC	ACCN	L 17–24	22,621
October 28	7:20 p.m.	at No. 13 Virginia Tech	Lane Stadium; Blacksburg, VA	ACCN	L 3–24	60,914
November 11	12:00 p.m.	at Army*	Michie Stadium; West Point, NY	CBSSN	L 16–21	38,851
November 18	3:30 p.m.	Georgia Tech	Wallace Wade Stadium; Durham, NC	ACCRSN	W 43–20	20,141
November 25	12:30 p.m.	at Wake Forest	BB&T Field; Winston-Salem, NC (rivalry)	ACCRSN	W 31–23	27,016
December 26	5:15 p.m.	vs. Northern Illinois*	Ford Field; Detroit, MI (Quick Lane Bowl)	ESPN	W 36–14	20,211
*Non-conference game; ^{†}Homecoming; Rankings from AP Poll released prior to the game; All times are in Eastern time

== Game summaries ==
=== North Carolina Central ===
	1	2	3	4	Total
Eagles	0	7	0	0	7
Blue Devils	21	26	6	7	60

=== Northwestern ===
	1	2	3	4	Total
Wildcats	3	7	0	7	17
Blue Devils	7	14	10	10	41

=== Baylor ===
	1	2	3	4	Total
Bears	7	0	13	0	20
Blue Devils	7	7	10	10	34

=== At North Carolina ===
	1	2	3	4	Total
Blue Devils	7	3	3	14	27
Tar Heels	3	7	7	0	17

=== Miami (FL) ===
	1	2	3	4	Total
No. 14 Hurricanes	14	3	0	14	31
Blue Devils	3	3	0	0	6

=== At Virginia ===
	1	2	3	4	Total
Blue Devils	7	7	0	7	21
Cavaliers	7	7	7	7	28

=== Florida State ===
	1	2	3	4	Total
Seminoles	7	0	3	7	17
Blue Devils	0	3	7	0	10

=== Pittsburgh ===
	1	2	3	4	Total
Panthers	7	0	7	10	24
Blue Devils	0	3	14	0	17

=== At Virginia Tech ===
	1	2	3	4	Total
Blue Devils	0	3	0	0	3
No. 13 Hokies	7	10	7	0	24

=== At Army ===
	1	2	3	4	Total
Blue Devils	3	7	0	6	16
Black Knights	7	14	0	0	21

=== Georgia Tech ===
	1	2	3	4	Total
Yellow Jackets	7	13	0	0	20
Blue Devils	3	17	10	13	43

=== At Wake Forest ===
	1	2	3	4	Total
Blue Devils	3	7	7	14	31
Demon Deacons	10	7	6	0	23

=== Vs. Northern Illinois–Quick Lane Bowl ===
	1	2	3	4	Total
Blue Devils	14	12	7	3	36
Huskies	0	14	0	0	14
