= 2017 Quick Lane Bowl =

- 4th Quick Lane Bowl
Duke Blue Devils	Northern Illinois Huskies
(6–6)	(8–4)
ACC	MAC
36	14
Head coach: David Cutcliffe	Head coach: Rod Carey
	1	2	3	4	Total
Duke	14	12	7	3	36
Northern Illinois	0	14	0	0	14
- Date: December 26, 2017
- Season: 2017
- Stadium: Ford Field
- Location: Detroit, Michigan
- MVP: Daniel Jones (QB, Duke)
- Favorite: Duke by 3.5
- Referee: James Carter (SEC)
- Attendance: 20,211
- Payout: US$1,200,000

United States TV coverage
- Network: ESPN
- Announcers: Mike Couzens, Ray Bentley Allison Williams

The 2017 Quick Lane Bowl was a postseason college football bowl game, played at Ford Field in Detroit, Michigan, on December 26, 2017. The game featured the Duke Blue Devils of the Atlantic Coast Conference and the Northern Illinois Huskies of the Mid-American Conference. The fourth annual Quick Lane Bowl, it was one of the 2017–18 bowl games that concluded the 2017 FBS football season. The game was sponsored by Quick Lane tire and auto centers.

== Teams ==
The game featured the Duke Blue Devils against the Northern Illinois Huskies.

This was the first meeting between the schools.

=== Duke ===
This was the thirteenth bowl game in school history for Duke and the Blue Devils' first to be played in Michigan.

=== Northern Illinois ===
This was the twelfth bowl game in school history for Northern Illinois and the Huskies' first to be played in Michigan.

== Game summary ==
=== Scoring summary ===
Scoring summary

Quarter	Time	Drive			Team	Scoring information	Score	
Quarter	Time	Plays	Yards	TOP	Team	Scoring information	Duke	NIU
1	6:00	10	58	3:28	Duke	Daniel Jones 1-yard touchdown run, William Holmquist kick good	7	0
1	3:17	3	11	1:15	Duke	Shaun Wilson 1-yard touchdown run, William Holmquist kick good	14	0
2	14:21	2	28	0:28	NIU	Tre Harbison 25-yard touchdown run, Christian Hagan kick good	14	7
2	12:22	2	69	0:37	NIU	Jauan Wesley 67-yard touchdown reception from Marcus Childers, Christian Hagan kick good	14	14
2	6:09	8	80	2:53	Duke	T.J. Rahming 33-yard touchdown reception from Daniel Jones, William Holmquist kick missed	20	14
2	1:33	7	64	2:32	Duke	Shaun Wilson 11-yard touchdown reception from Daniel Jones, 2-point pass no good	26	14
3	6:58	11	67	3:52	Duke	Brittain Brown 7-yard touchdown run, William Holmquist kick good	33	14
4	7:37	16	64	7:38	Duke	24-yard field goal by William Holmquist	36	14
"TOP" = time of possession. For other American football terms, see Glossary of American football.							36	14

=== Statistics ===
	1	2	3	4	Total
Blue Devils	14	12	7	3	36
Huskies	0	14	0	0	14

Statistics	Duke	NIU
First downs	27	13
Third down efficiency	10–19	1–12
Plays–yards	92–465	57–299
Rushes-yards	52–213	29–65
Passing yards	252	234
Passing, Comp-Att-Int	27–40–0	15–28–0
Time of Possession	38:21	21:39

Team	Category	Player	Statistics
Duke	Passing	Daniel Jones	27/40, 252 yards, 2 TD
Duke	Rushing	Daniel Jones	16 carries, 86 yards, 1 TD
Duke	Receiving	Daniel Helm	5 receptions, 73 yards
Northern Illinois	Passing	Marcus Childers	15/26, 234 yards, 1 TD
Northern Illinois	Rushing	Tre Harbison	13 carries, 59 yards, 1 TD
Northern Illinois	Receiving	Jauan Wesley	2, receptions, 109 yards, 1 TD
