= 2017 Pittsburgh Panthers football team =

American college football season

2017 Pittsburgh Panthers football
- Conference: Atlantic Coast Conference
- Coastal Division
- Record: 5–7 (3–5 ACC)
- Head coach: Pat Narduzzi (3rd season)
- Offensive coordinator: Shawn Watson (1st season)
- Offensive scheme: Pro-style
- Defensive coordinator: Josh Conklin (3rd season)
- Base defense: 4–3
- Home stadium: Heinz Field

2017 Atlantic Coast Conference football standings
	Conf.			Overall
Team	W		L	W		L
Atlantic Division
No. 4 Clemson xy$^	7	–	1	12	–	2
No. 23 NC State	6	–	2	9	–	4
Wake Forest	4	–	4	8	–	5
Louisville	4	–	4	8	–	5
Boston College	4	–	4	7	–	6
Florida State	3	–	5	7	–	6
Syracuse	2	–	6	4	–	8
Coastal Division
No. 13 Miami (FL) xy	7	–	1	10	–	3
No. 24 Virginia Tech	5	–	3	9	–	4
Georgia Tech	4	–	4	5	–	6
Virginia	3	–	5	6	–	7
Pittsburgh	3	–	5	5	–	7
Duke	3	–	5	7	–	6
North Carolina	1	–	7	3	–	9
Championship: Clemson 38, Miami 3
^ – College Football Playoff participant; $ – Conference champion; x – Division champion/co-champions; y – Championship game participant; Rankings from AP Poll

The 2017 Pittsburgh Panthers football team represented the University of Pittsburgh in the 2017 NCAA Division I FBS football season. The Panthers were led by third-year head coach Pat Narduzzi and played their home games at Heinz Field. They were a member of the Coastal Division of the Atlantic Coast Conference (ACC). This was Pitt's fifth season as a member of the ACC. They finished the season 5–7, 3–5 in ACC play to finish in a three-way tie for fourth place.

== Recruiting ==
=== Position key ===
Back	B	Center	C	Cornerback	CB	Defensive back	DB
Defensive end	DE	Defensive lineman	DL	Defensive tackle	DT	End	E
Fullback	FB	Guard	G	Halfback	HB	Kicker	K
Kickoff returner	KR	Offensive tackle	OT	Offensive lineman	OL	Linebacker	LB
Long snapper	LS	Punter	P	Punt returner	PR	Quarterback	QB
Running back	RB	Safety	S	Tight end	TE	Wide receiver	WR

=== Recruits ===
The Panthers signed a total of 24 recruits.

College recruiting (2017)
Name	Hometown	School	Height	Weight	Commit date
Paris Ford; S	Munhall, Pennsylvania	Steel Valley HS	6 ft 1 in (1.85 m)	180 lb (82 kg)	Oct 16, 2015
Paris Ford; S	Recruit ratings: Scout: Rivals: 247Sports: ESPN:				
Kyle Nunn; S	Findlay, Ohio	Findlay HS	6 ft 3 in (1.91 m)	196 lb (89 kg)	Apr 16, 2016
Kyle Nunn; S	Recruit ratings: Scout: Rivals: 247Sports: ESPN:				
Kenny Pickett; QB	Oakhurst, New Jersey	Ocean Township HS	6 ft 3 in (1.91 m)	200 lb (91 kg)	Jun 4, 2016
Kenny Pickett; QB	Recruit ratings: Scout: Rivals: 247Sports: ESPN:				
Cameron Bright; LB	Montgomery, Alabama	Park Crossing HS	6 ft 1 in (1.85 m)	210 lb (95 kg)	Jun 5, 2016
Cameron Bright; LB	Recruit ratings: Scout: Rivals: 247Sports: ESPN:				
Darian Street; WR	Bethlehem, Pennsylvania	Liberty HS	6 ft 1 in (1.85 m)	175 lb (79 kg)	Jun 6, 2016
Darian Street; WR	Recruit ratings: Scout: Rivals: 247Sports: ESPN:				
Owen Drexel; C	Montclair, New Jersey	Montclair HS	6 ft 4 in (1.93 m)	280 lb (130 kg)	Jun 15, 2016
Owen Drexel; C	Recruit ratings: Scout: Rivals: 247Sports: ESPN:				
Todd Sibley; RB	Akron, Ohio	Hoban HS	5 ft 10 in (1.78 m)	202 lb (92 kg)	Jun 15, 2016
Todd Sibley; RB	Recruit ratings: Scout: Rivals: 247Sports: ESPN:				
Carson Van Lynn; OT	Columbus, Ohio	Kilbourne HS	6 ft 7 in (2.01 m)	255 lb (116 kg)	Jun 22, 2016
Carson Van Lynn; OT	Recruit ratings: Scout: Rivals: 247Sports: ESPN:				
Albert Tucker; LB	Fort Lauderdale, Florida	St. Thomas Aquinas HS	6 ft 1 in (1.85 m)	197 lb (89 kg)	Jun 28, 2016
Albert Tucker; LB	Recruit ratings: Scout: Rivals: 247Sports: ESPN:				
Dontavius Butler; WR	Fort Lauderdale, Florida	American Heritage HS	6 ft 2 in (1.88 m)	195 lb (88 kg)	Jul 31, 2016
Dontavius Butler; WR	Recruit ratings: Scout: Rivals: 247Sports: ESPN:				
Gabe Houy; OT	Pittsburgh, Pennsylvania	Upper St. Clair HS	6 ft 6 in (1.98 m)	250 lb (110 kg)	Aug 1, 2016
Gabe Houy; OT	Recruit ratings: Scout: Rivals: 247Sports: ESPN:				
Kirk Christodoulou; K	Melbourne, Australia	Proquick Australia	6 ft 1 in (1.85 m)	210 lb (95 kg)	Aug 2, 2016
Kirk Christodoulou; K	Recruit ratings: Scout: Rivals: 247Sports: ESPN:				
Tyler Sear; TE	New Castle, Pennsylvania	Neshannock HS	6 ft 5 in (1.96 m)	240 lb (110 kg)	Aug 18, 2016
Tyler Sear; TE	Recruit ratings: Scout: Rivals: 247Sports: ESPN:				
Grant Carrigan; TE	Gibsonia, Pennsylvania	Pine-Richland HS	6 ft 7 in (2.01 m)	250 lb (110 kg)	Aug 18, 2016
Grant Carrigan; TE	Recruit ratings: Scout: Rivals: 247Sports: ESPN:				
Carter Warren; OT	Wayne, New Jersey	Passaic County Tech	6 ft 6 in (1.98 m)	315 lb (143 kg)	Oct 8, 2016
Carter Warren; OT	Recruit ratings: Scout: Rivals: 247Sports: ESPN:				
Charles Reeves; TE	Steubenville, Ohio	Steubenville HS	6 ft 5 in (1.96 m)	230 lb (100 kg)	Oct 26, 2016
Charles Reeves; TE	Recruit ratings: Scout: Rivals: 247Sports: ESPN:				
Jerry Drake Jr. OT	Palm Beach Gardens, Florida	Palm Beach Gardens HS	6 ft 6 in (1.98 m)	310 lb (140 kg)	Dec 15, 2016
Jerry Drake Jr. OT	Recruit ratings: Scout: Rivals: 247Sports: ESPN:				
Deslin Alexandre; DE	Deerfield Beach, Florida	Deerfield Beach HS	6 ft 5 in (1.96 m)	230 lb (100 kg)	Dec 16, 2016
Deslin Alexandre; DE	Recruit ratings: Scout: Rivals: 247Sports: ESPN:				
Damarri Mathis; CB	Lakeland, Florida	Lakeland HS	5 ft 11 in (1.80 m)	175 lb (79 kg)	Dec 22, 2016
Damarri Mathis; CB	Recruit ratings: Scout: Rivals: 247Sports: ESPN:				
Jason Pinnock; CB	Windsor, Connecticut	Windsor HS	6 ft 1 in (1.85 m)	190 lb (86 kg)	Jan 17, 2017
Jason Pinnock; CB	Recruit ratings: Scout: Rivals: 247Sports: ESPN:				
Michael Smith; WR	Vero Beach, Florida	Vero Beach HS	6 ft 2 in (1.88 m)	200 lb (91 kg)	Jan 18, 2017
Michael Smith; WR	Recruit ratings: Scout: Rivals: 247Sports: ESPN:				
Kamonte Carter; DT	Germantown, Maryland	East Mississippi Community College	6 ft 4 in (1.93 m)	305 lb (138 kg)	Jan 22, 2017
Kamonte Carter; DT	Recruit ratings: Scout: Rivals: 247Sports: ESPN:				
Jaylen Twyman; DT	Washington, D.C.	Woodson HS	6 ft 2 in (1.88 m)	290 lb (130 kg)	Feb 1, 2017
Jaylen Twyman; DT	Recruit ratings: Scout: Rivals: 247Sports: ESPN:				
A.J. Davis; RB	Lakeland, Florida	Lakeland HS	5 ft 11 in (1.80 m)	190 lb (86 kg)	Feb 1, 2017
A.J. Davis; RB	Recruit ratings: Scout: Rivals: 247Sports: ESPN:				
Overall recruit ranking:
Note: In many cases, Scout, Rivals, 247Sports, On3, and ESPN may conflict in their listings of height and weight.; In these cases, the average was taken. ESPN grades are on a 100-point scale.; Sources: "Pittsburgh Football Commitments". Rivals.; "2017 Pittsburgh Football Commits". Scout.; "ESPN". ESPN.; "Scout.com Team Recruiting Rankings". Scout.; "2017 Team Ranking". Rivals.com.

== Coaching staff ==
2017 Pittsburgh Panthers football staff
Coaching staff: Pat Narduzzi – head coach; Shawn Watson – Offensive coordinator/quarterbacks; Josh Conklin – Defensive coordinator; Andre Powell – Running backs/special teams; Charlie Partridge – Defensive line; John Peterson – Offensive line; Renaldo Hill – Cornerbacks; Tim Salem – Tight ends; Kevin Sherman – Wide receivers; Rob Harley – Linebackers/recruiting coordinator	Support staff: Chris Lasala – Associate Athletic Director/football operations; Bob Junko – Director of player development and High School Relations; Ben Mathers – Director of football operations; Mark Diethorn – Director of Recruiting; Ben Cotton – Offensive graduate assistant; Joshua Lott – Defensive graduate assistant; Rob Greene – Offensive graduate assistant; Phil Decapito – Defensive graduate assistant	Strength and conditioning staff: Dave Andrews – Head Strength and Conditioning Coach; Freddie Walker – Associate Strength and Conditioning Coach; Austin Addington-Strapp – Assistant strength and conditioning coach

== Roster ==
2017 Pittsburgh Panthers football roster
Quarterbacks: 3 Ben DiNucci – (redshirt) sophomore (6'2, 220); 4 Max Browne – (redshirt) senior (6'5, 230); 7 Thomas MacVittie – (redshirt) freshman (6'5, 225); 8 Kenny Pickett – freshman (6'2, 215); 19 Jake Zilinskas – sophomore (6'2, 210); Tailbacks: 21 A.J. Davis – freshman (6'0, 205); 22 Darrin Hall – junior (5'11, 220); 23 Todd Sibley Jr. – freshman (5'9, 215); 26 Chawntez Moss – sophomore (5'11, 210); 36 Shawn Wood – (redshirt) freshman (6'0, 210); 37 Qadree Ollison – (redshirt) junior (6'2, 230); 39 Kyle Vreen – (redshirt) freshman (5'10, 190); Fullbacks: 35 George Aston – (redshirt) junior (6'0, 245); 40 Colton Lively – (redshirt) senior (6'0, 235); 47 Ryan Sliwoski – junior (5'11, 230); 49 Erik Sellers – (redshirt) sophomore (6'1, 235); Wide receivers: 5 Tre Tipton – (redshirt) sophomore (6'0, 190); 6 Aaron Mathews – sophomore (6'4, 205); 9 Michael Smith – freshman (6'1, 205); 10 Quadree Henderson – junior (5'8, 190); 11 Ruben Flowers III – (redshirt) freshman (6'3, 205); 34 Mark Bernsdorff – senior (5’11, 195); 46 Michael Vardzel – (redshirt) freshman (5'11, 190); 48 Kellen McAlone – (redshirt) junior (6'2, 205); 80 Dontavius Butler-Jenkins – freshman (6'0, 205); 82 Rafael Araujo-Lopes – (redshirt) junior (5'9, 190); 83 Darian Street – freshman (6'1, 180); 84 Garrett Bickhart – freshman (6'5, 190); 85 Jester Weah – (redshirt) senior (6'3, 210); Tight ends: 19 Charles Reeves Jr. – freshman (6'5, 280); 45 Devon Edwards – (redshirt) senior (6'4, 275); 81 Nathan Bossory – senior (6'3, 240); 84 Grant Carrigan – freshman (6'7, 275); 86 Tyler Sear – freshman (6'4, 245); 87 Chris Clark – (redshirt) sophomore (6'6, 260); 88 Matt Flanagan – (redshirt) senior (6'6, 260)	Offensive linemen: 54 Justin Morgan – (redshirt) freshman (6’6, 350); 55 Jaryd Jones-Smith – (redshirt) senior (6’7, 320); 56 Brandon Ford – (redshirt) freshman (6’5, 310); 57 Gabe Houy – freshman (6'6, 280); 58 Brandon Hodges – (redshirt) senior (6’4, 315); 60 Owen Drexel – freshman (6'3, 270); 63 Alex Officer – (redshirt) senior (6’4, 340); 67 Jimmy Morrissey – (redshirt) freshman (6’3, 295); 68 Brian Burgess – freshman (6’2, 295); 69 Kenny Rainey III – freshman (6'3, 330); 70 Brian O'Neill – (redshirt) junior (6’6, 305); 71 Bryce Hargrove – (redshirt) freshman (6’4, 310); 72 Tony Pilato – (redshirt) sophomore (6’5, 320); 74 Jerry Drake Jr. – freshman (6’5, 315); 76 Connor Dintino – (redshirt) junior (6’3, 315); 77 Carter Warren – freshman (6'5, 325); 78 Alex Bookser – (redshirt) junior (6’6, 315); Defensive linemen: 5 Kam Carter – (redshirt) sophomore (6'4, 295); 8 Dewayne Hendrix – (redshirt) junior (6’4, 260); 10 Keyshon Camp – (redshirt) freshman (6’4, 290); 17 Rashad Weaver – (redshirt) freshman (6’5, 265); 31 Kaezon Pugh – (redshirt) freshman (6’1, 250); 34 Amir Watts – sophomore (6’3, 285); 40 James Folston Jr. – (redshirt) junior (6’4, 250); 51 Jim Medure – (redshirt) sophomore (6’2, 225); 55 Jaylen Twyman – freshman (6'2, 315); 59 Carson van Lynn – freshman (6'5, 255); 66 Mike Herndon – (redshirt) junior (6’4, 310); 86 Julian Desire' – (redshirt) freshman (6’3, 215); 90 Rashad Wheeler – (redshirt) freshman (6’3, 290); 91 Patrick Jones II – (redshirt) freshman (6’5, 245); 93 Shane Roy – (redshirt) junior (6’4, 280); 95 Greg Sizemore – freshman (6'1, 230); 96 Allen Edwards – (redshirt) senior (6’4, 255); 97 Deslin Alexandre – freshman (6'4, 255); Punters: 18 Ryan Winslow – (redshirt) senior (6'6, 225); 98 Kirk Christodoulou – freshman (6'1, 215)	Linebackers: 23 Oluwaseun Idowu – (redshirt) junior (6’0, 225); 25 Elijah Zeise – (redshirt) junior (6’2, 230); 28 Anthony McKee Jr. – (redshirt) sophomore (6’2, 215); 30 Albert Tucker – freshman (6'1, 210); 36 Chase Pine – (redshirt) freshman (6’2, 240); 38 Cam Bright – freshman (6'0, 210); 39 Saleem Brightwell – (redshirt) sophomore (6’0, 220); 41 Jalen Williams – (redshirt) junior (6’2, 215); 44 Elias Reynolds – (redshirt) freshman (6’2, 235); 47 Kyle Nunn – freshman (6'3, 200); 48 Peyton Deri – (redshirt) freshman (6’1, 225); 53 Brian Popp – (redshirt) junior (6'0, 235); 58 Quintin Wirginis – senior (6'2, 245); Defensive backs: 2 Maurice Ffrench – sophomore (5'11, 190) (+WR); 3 Damar Hamlin – sophomore (6’1, 190); 4 Therran Coleman – (redshirt) freshman (6’0, 195); 7 Henry Miller – (redshirt) freshman (6’3, 205); 9 Jordan Whitehead – junior (5’11, 195); 11 Dane Jackson – (redshirt) sophomore (6’0, 180); 12 Paris Ford – freshman (6'0, 175); 14 Avonte Maddox – senior (5’9, 180); 15 Jason Pinnock – freshman (6'0, 190); 16 Damarri Mathis – freshman (5'11, 185); 20 Dennis Briggs – (redshirt) junior (5’10, 195); 21 Malik Henderson – (redshirt) sophomore (6’0, 190); 22 Kollin Smith – freshman (5'10, 170); 24 Phil Campbell – (redshirt) freshman (6’1, 195); 27 Bricen Garner – (redshirt) freshman (6’1, 180); 32 Phillipie Motley – (redshirt) junior (5’10, 175); 35 Rob Boatright – (redshirt) senior (5’10, 190); 43 Jazzee Stocker – (redshirt) sophomore (6’2, 190); 46 Rimoni Dorsey – (redshirt) sophomore (6’0, 195); Placekickers: 49 Ian Troost – junior (6'6, 200); 92 Jake Scarton – freshman (6'3, 180); 97 Alex Kessman – (redshirt) freshman (6'3, 190); Long snappers: 61 Cal Adomitis – freshman (6'1, 210)

== Schedule ==
The Panthers schedule was released on January 24, 2017.

Date	Time	Opponent	Site	TV	Result	Attendance
September 2	1:00 p.m.	No. 9 (FCS) Youngstown State*	Heinz Field; Pittsburgh, PA	ACCN Extra	W 28–21 ^{OT}	40,012
September 9	3:30 p.m.	at No. 4 Penn State*	Beaver Stadium; University Park, PA (rivalry)	ABC	L 14–33	109,898
September 16	12:00 p.m.	No. 9 Oklahoma State*	Heinz Field; Pittsburgh, PA	ESPN	L 21–59	38,952
September 23	12:20 p.m.	at Georgia Tech	Bobby Dodd Stadium; Atlanta, GA	ACCN	L 17–35	40,211
September 30	12:00 p.m.	Rice*	Heinz Field; Pittsburgh, PA	ACCRSN	W 42–10	33,051
October 7	12:30 p.m.	at Syracuse	Carrier Dome; Syracuse, NY (rivalry)	ACCRSN	L 24–27	33,290
October 14	12:00 p.m.	No. 20 NC State^{†}	Heinz Field; Pittsburgh, PA	ACCRSN	L 17–35	41,124
October 21	12:20 p.m.	at Duke	Wallace Wade Stadium; Durham, NC	ACCN	W 24–17	22,621
October 28	12:30 p.m.	Virginia	Heinz Field; Pittsburgh, PA	ACCRSN	W 31–14	30,889
November 9	7:30 p.m.	North Carolina	Heinz Field; Pittsburgh, PA	ESPN	L 31–34	34,056
November 18	12:20 p.m.	at Virginia Tech	Lane Stadium; Blacksburg, VA	ACCN	L 14–20	58,948
November 24	12:00 p.m.	No. 2 Miami (FL)	Heinz Field; Pittsburgh, PA	ABC	W 24–14	35,978
*Non-conference game; ^{†}Homecoming; Rankings from AP Poll released prior to the game; All times are in Eastern time

== Game summaries ==
=== Youngstown State ===
Youngstown State at Pittsburgh

Team	1	2	3	4	OT	Total
No. 9 (FCS) Penguins	0	0	7	14	0	21
• Panthers	14	7	0	0	7	28

- Date: September 2
- Location:
  Heinz Field
  Pittsburgh, PA
- Game start: 1:03 p.m. EDT
- Elapsed time: 3:18
- Game attendance: 40,012
- Game weather: 66°F • SE 9 • Mostly Cloudy
- Referee: Jeff Flanagan
- TV announcers (ACCN Extra):
  Play-by-Play: Robert Lee
  Analyst: Dustin Fox

=== At Penn State ===
Pittsburgh at Penn State

Team	1	2	3	4	Total
Panthers	0	3	3	8	14
• No. 4 Nittany Lions	14	0	7	12	33

- Date: September 9
- Location:
  Beaver Stadium
  University Park, PA
- Game start: 3:41 p.m. EDT
- Elapsed time: 3:20
- Game attendance: 109,898
- Game weather: 65°F • W 5 • Sunny
- Referee: Jerry Magallanes
- TV announcers (ABC):
  Play-by-Play: Joe Tessitore
  Analyst: Todd Blackledge

=== Oklahoma State ===
Oklahoma State at Pittsburgh

Team	1	2	3	4	Total
• No. 9 Cowboys	21	28	7	3	59
Panthers	0	14	7	0	21

- Date: September 16
- Location:
  Heinz Field
  Pittsburgh, PA
- Game start: 12:01 p.m. EDT
- Elapsed time: 3:13
- Game attendance: 38,952
- Game weather: 75°F • E 2 • Mostly Sunny
- Referee: Cooper Castleberry
- TV announcers (ESPN):
  Play-by-Play: Dave Pasch
  Analyst: Greg McElroy

=== At Georgia Tech ===
Pittsburgh at Georgia Tech

Team	1	2	3	4	Total
Panthers	7	10	0	0	17
• Yellow Jackets	7	14	7	7	35

- Date: September 23
- Location:
  Bobby Dodd Stadium
  Atlanta, GA
- Game start: 12:20 p.m. EDT
- Elapsed time: 3:08
- Game attendance: 40,211
- Game weather: 83°F • ENE 6 • Clear and Sunny
- Referee: Jeff Heaser
- TV announcers (ACCN):
  Play-by-Play: Tom Werme
  Analyst: David Archer

=== Rice ===
Rice at Pittsburgh

Team	1	2	3	4	Total
Owls	0	0	10	0	10
• Panthers	21	7	0	14	42

- Date: September 30
- Location:
  Heinz Field
  Pittsburgh, PA
- Game start: 12:04 p.m. EDT
- Elapsed time: 2:59
- Game attendance: 33,051
- Game weather: 56°F • NW 9 • Mostly Sunny
- Referee: Jeff Maconaghy
- TV announcers (ACCRSN):
  Play-by-Play: Evan Lepler
  Analyst: Takeo Spikes

=== At Syracuse ===
Pittsburgh at Syracuse

Team	1	2	3	4	Total
Panthers	0	10	3	11	24
• Orange	3	7	10	7	27

- Date: October 7
- Location:
  Carrier Dome
  Syracuse, NY
- Game start: 12:34 p.m. EDT
- Elapsed time: 3:33
- Game attendance: 33,290
- Game weather: Dome
- Referee: Tra Blake
- TV announcers (ACCRSN):
  Play-by-Play: Wes Durham
  Analyst: James Bates

=== NC State ===
NC State at Pittsburgh

Team	1	2	3	4	Total
• No. 20 Wolfpack	14	0	7	14	35
Panthers	7	7	0	3	17

- Date: October 14
- Location:
  Heinz Field
  Pittsburgh, PA
- Game start: 12:03 p.m. EDT
- Elapsed time: 3:13
- Game attendance: 41,124
- Game weather: 72°F • SSE 6 • Mostly Sunny
- Referee: Riley Johnson
- TV announcers (ACCRSN):
  Play-by-Play: Evan Lepler
  Analyst: Takeo Spikes

=== At Duke ===
Pittsburgh at Duke

Team	1	2	3	4	Total
• Panthers	7	0	7	10	24
Blue Devils	0	3	14	0	17

- Date: October 21
- Location:
  Wallace Wade Stadium
  Durham, NC
- Game start: 12:20 p.m. EDT
- Elapsed time: 3:10
- Game attendance: 21,621
- Game weather: 66°F • NE 3 • Clear
- Referee: David Epperley
- TV announcers (ACCN):
  Play-by-Play: Tom Werme
  Analyst: David Archer

=== Virginia ===
Virginia at Pittsburgh

Team	1	2	3	4	Total
Cavaliers	0	7	0	7	14
• Panthers	7	14	7	3	31

- Date: October 28
- Location:
  Heinz Field
  Pittsburgh, PA
- Game start: 12:34 p.m. EDT
- Elapsed time: 2:54
- Game attendance: 30,889
- Game weather: 55°F • S 7 • Light Rain
- Referee: Duane Heydt
- TV announcers (ACCRSN):
  Play-by-Play: Wes Durham
  Analyst: James Bates

=== North Carolina ===
North Carolina at Pittsburgh

Team	1	2	3	4	Total
• Tar Heels	14	10	3	7	34
Panthers	3	14	7	7	31

- Date: November 9
- Location:
  Heinz Field
  Pittsburgh, PA
- Game start: 7:31 p.m. EST
- Elapsed time: 3:21
- Game attendance: 34,056
- Game weather: 43°F • WSW 10 • Partly Cloudy
- Referee: Jeff Heaser
- TV announcers (ESPN):
  Play-by-Play: Dave Flemming
  Analyst: Joey Galloway, Booger McFarland

=== At Virginia Tech ===
Pittsburgh at Virginia Tech

Team	1	2	3	4	Total
Panthers	7	0	0	7	14
• Hokies	7	3	0	10	20

- Date: November 18
- Location:
  Lane Stadium
  Blacksburg, VA
- Game start: 12:20 p.m. EST
- Elapsed time: 3:11
- Game attendance: 58,948
- Game weather: 57°F • WSW 2 • Cloudy
- Referee: Jeff Flanagan
- TV announcers (ACCN):
  Play-by-Play: Brock Bowling
  Analyst: Renaldo Wynn

=== Miami (FL) ===
Miami (FL) at Pittsburgh

Team	1	2	3	4	Total
No. 2 Hurricanes	0	7	0	7	14
• Panthers	3	7	7	7	24

- Date: November 24
- Location:
  Heinz Field
  Pittsburgh, PA
- Game start: 12:07 p.m. EST
- Elapsed time: 3:21
- Game attendance: 35,978
- Game weather: 43°F • S 8 • Sunny
- Referee: Gary Patterson
- TV announcers (ABC):
  Play-by-Play: Bob Wischusen
  Analyst: Brock Huard

== 2018 NFL draft ==
Player	Position	Round	Pick	NFL club
Brian O'Neill	Offensive Tackle	2	62	Minnesota Vikings
Jordan Whitehead	Safety	4	117	Tampa Bay Buccaneers
Avonte Maddox	Cornerback	4	125	Philadelphia Eagles
