= Justice Hill =

American football player (born 1997)

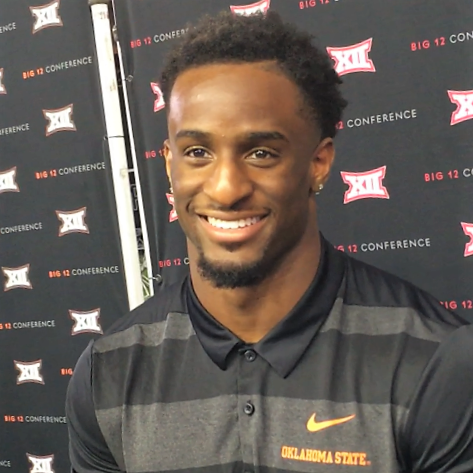
- Hill in 2018

No. 43 – Baltimore Ravens
- Positions: Running back, kickoff returner
- Roster status: Active

Personal information
- Born: November 14, 1997 (age 29); Tulsa, Oklahoma, U.S.
- Listed height: 5 ft 10 in (1.78 m)
- Listed weight: 195 lb (88 kg)

Career information
- High school: Booker T. Washington (Tulsa)
- College: Oklahoma State (2016–2018)
- NFL draft: 2019: 4th round, 113th overall pick

Career history
- Baltimore Ravens (2019–present)

Awards and highlights
- 2× First-team All-Big 12 (2017, 2018); Second-team All-Big 12 (2016); Big 12 Offensive Freshman of the Year (2016)

Career NFL statistics as of 2025
- Rushing yards: 1,255
- Rushing average: 4.7
- Rushing touchdowns: 8
- Receptions: 116
- Receiving yards: 906
- Receiving touchdowns: 5
- Stats at Pro Football Reference

Justice Hill (born November 14, 1997) is an American professional football running back and kickoff returner for the Baltimore Ravens of the National Football League (NFL). He played college football for the Oklahoma State Cowboys and was selected by the Ravens in the fourth round of the 2019 NFL draft.

== Early life ==
Hill was a three-star player out of Booker T. Washington High School that signed with Oklahoma State. He was an Oklahoma All-State selection and was the 6A-II Offensive Player of the Year as a senior. He had offers from Houston, Louisville, and Oklahoma State. He rushed for 3,364 yards in high school and averaged 8.1 yards per carry and scored 54 touchdowns, 32 of which came his senior season.

== College career ==
As a true freshman at Oklahoma State University in 2016, Hill started the season as a backup. By the start of Big 12 play Hill started to heat up with 122 yards and his first career touchdown against Baylor. By the end of the season he had 7 games of 99 rushing yards or more. He received both Big 12 and national accolades, with Big 12 Newcomer of the Year and Freshman All-American honors. He was the leading returning rusher in the Big 12 entering the 2017 season. On December 3, 2018, Hill announced that he would forgo his senior year of eligibility and declare for the 2019 NFL draft.

=== Statistics ===
| Year | Team | Rushing | | | | Receiving | | | |
| Year | Team | Att | Yds | Avg | TD | Rec | Yds | Avg | TD |
|---|---|---|---|---|---|---|---|---|---|
| 2016 | Oklahoma State | 206 | 1,142 | 5.5 | 6 | 5 | 46 | 9.2 | 0 |
| 2017 | Oklahoma State | 268 | 1,467 | 5.5 | 15 | 31 | 190 | 6.1 | 1 |
| 2018 | Oklahoma State | 158 | 930 | 5.9 | 9 | 13 | 68 | 5.2 | 0 |
| Career | | 632 | 3,539 | 5.6 | 30 | 49 | 304 | 6.2 | 1 |

== Professional career ==
Pre-draft measurables
| Height | Weight | Arm length | Hand span | Wingspan | 40-yard dash | 10-yard split | 20-yard split | Vertical jump | Broad jump | Bench press |
|---|---|---|---|---|---|---|---|---|---|---|
| 5 ft 9 5/8 in (1.77 m) | 198 lb (90 kg) | 31 5/8 in (0.80 m) | 9 1/2 in (0.24 m) | 6 ft 2 7/8 in (1.90 m) | 4.40 s | 1.48 s | 2.60 s | 40.0 in (1.02 m) | 10 ft 10 in (3.30 m) | 21 reps |
All values from NFL Combine

Hill performed very well in the 2019 NFL Combine, showing good speed and strength. He had the fastest 40-yard dash time for all running backs, as well as the best vertical and broad jump.

Hill was selected by the Baltimore Ravens in the fourth round, 113th overall, of the 2019 NFL draft. The Ravens had acquired the pick in a trade that sent quarterback Joe Flacco to the Denver Broncos. In Week 1 of the 2019 season, he made his NFL debut in the Ravens' 59–10 victory over the Miami Dolphins. He had seven carries for 27 yards. In his rookie season, Hill finished with 225 rushing yards and two rushing touchdowns.

On September 6, 2021, Hill tore his Achilles, prematurely ending his season. He was placed on injured reserve on September 8.

On March 17, 2023, Hill signed a two-year contract extension with the Ravens. On September 20, 2024, Hill agreed to a new two–year, $6 million contract extension with Baltimore.

Hill began the 2025 season as Baltimore's third-string running back behind Derrick Henry and Keaton Mitchell. In 10 appearances for the team, he recorded 18 carries for 93 yards and two touchdowns; he also logged 21 receptions for 169 yards and one touchdowns. On November 27, 2025, Hill was placed on injured reserve after suffering a neck injury in practice.

== NFL career statistics ==
Legend
| **Bold** | Career high |

=== Regular season ===
| Year | Team | Games | | Rushing | | | | | Receiving | | | | | Fumbles | |
| Year | Team | GP | GS | Att | Yds | Avg | Lng | TD | Rec | Yds | Avg | Lng | TD | Fum | Lost |
|---|---|---|---|---|---|---|---|---|---|---|---|---|---|---|---|
| 2019 | BAL | 16 | 0 | 58 | 225 | 3.9 | 18 | 2 | 8 | 70 | 8.8 | 14 | 0 | 0 | 0 |
| 2020 | BAL | 12 | 0 | 12 | 60 | 5.0 | 19 | 0 | 5 | 20 | 4.0 | 8 | 0 | 0 | 0 |
| 2021 | BAL | 0 | 0 | Did not play due to injury | | | | | | | | | | | |
| 2022 | BAL | 15 | 0 | 49 | 262 | **5.3** | 34 | 0 | 12 | 58 | 4.8 | 15 | 0 | **2** | **1** |
| 2023 | BAL | 16 | 5 | **84** | **387** | 4.6 | 41 | **3** | 28 | 206 | 7.4 | 24 | 1 | 1 | **1** |
| 2024 | BAL | 15 | 0 | 47 | 228 | 4.9 | 51 | 1 | **42** | **383** | **9.1** | 27 | **3** | 0 | 0 |
| 2025 | BAL | 10 | 0 | 18 | 93 | 5.2 | **71** | 2 | 21 | 169 | 8.0 | **37** | 1 | 1 | 0 |
| 2026 | BAL | 9 | 0 | 33 | 240 | 5.0 | 65 | 1 | 20 | 111 | 5.5 | 15 | 0 | 0 | 0 |
| Career | | 84 | 5 | 301 | 1,495 | 9.7 | 71 | 9 | 126 | 1,127 | 7.5 | 37 | 5 | 4 | 2 |

=== Postseason ===
| Year | Team | Games | | Rushing | | | | | Receiving | | | | | Fumbles | |
| Year | Team | GP | GS | Att | Yds | Avg | Lng | TD | Rec | Yds | Avg | Lng | TD | Fum | Lost |
|---|---|---|---|---|---|---|---|---|---|---|---|---|---|---|---|
| 2019 | BAL | 1 | 0 | 0 | 0 | 0.0 | — | 0 | 4 | 26 | 6.5 | **14** | 0 | 0 | 0 |
| 2020 | BAL | 2 | 0 | 0 | 0 | 0.0 | — | 0 | 0 | 0 | 0.0 | — | 0 | 0 | 0 |
| 2022 | BAL | 1 | 0 | 0 | 0 | 0.0 | — | 0 | 2 | 10 | 5.0 | 9 | 0 | 0 | 0 |
| 2023 | BAL | 2 | 2 | **16** | **69** | 4.3 | 14 | 0 | **6** | **45** | **7.5** | 11 | 0 | 0 | 0 |
| 2024 | BAL | 2 | 0 | 12 | 62 | 5.2 | **22** | 0 | **6** | 20 | 3.3 | 7 | **1** | 0 | 0 |
| Career | | 8 | 2 | 28 | 131 | 4.7 | 22 | 0 | 18 | 101 | 5.6 | 14 | 1 | 0 | 0 |

== Personal life ==
His brother, Daxton Hill, was selected by the Cincinnati Bengals in the first round of the 2022 NFL draft.
