= James Washington (wide receiver) =

American football player (born 1996)

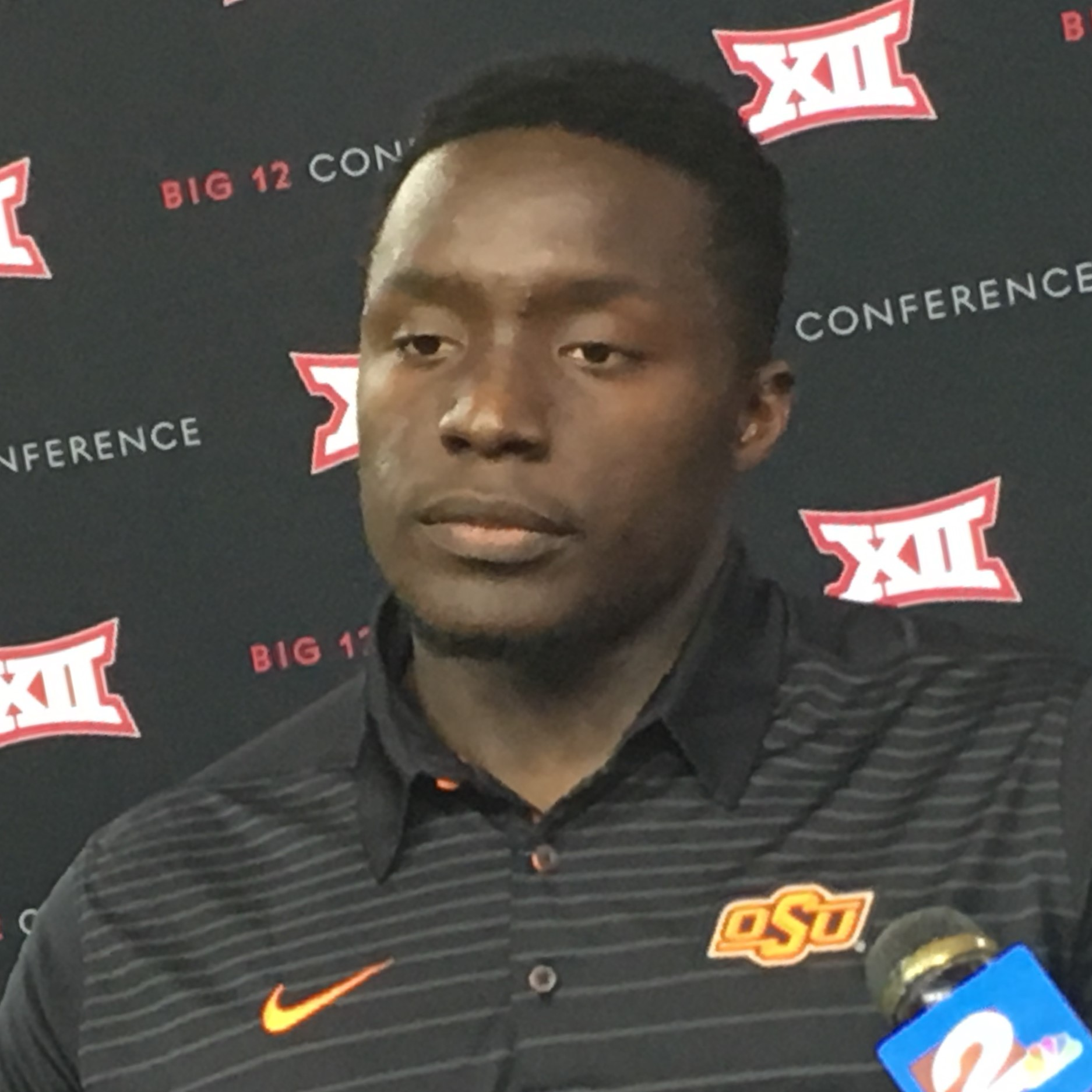
- Washington in 2017

Profile
- Position: Wide receiver

Personal information
- Born: April 2, 1996 (age 30); Stamford, Texas, U.S.
- Listed height: 5 ft 11 in (1.80 m)
- Listed weight: 216 lb (98 kg)

Career information
- High school: Stamford
- College: Oklahoma State (2014–2017)
- NFL draft: 2018: 2nd round, 60th overall pick

Career history
- Pittsburgh Steelers (2018–2021); Dallas Cowboys (2022); New York Giants (2022)*; New Orleans Saints (2023)*; Indianapolis Colts (2023)*; Atlanta Falcons (2024)*
- * Offseason or practice squad member only

Awards and highlights
- Fred Biletnikoff Award (2017); Unanimous All-American (2017); 2× First-team All-Big 12 (2016, 2017); Second-team All-Big 12 (2015)

Career NFL statistics
- Receptions: 114
- Receiving yards: 1,629
- Receiving touchdowns: 11
- Stats at Pro Football Reference

James Edward Washington Jr. (born April 2, 1996) is an American professional football wide receiver. He played college football for the Oklahoma State Cowboys, winning the Fred Biletnikoff Award and earning unanimous All-American honors in 2017. Washington was selected by the Pittsburgh Steelers in the second round of the 2018 NFL draft. He has also been a member of the Dallas Cowboys, New York Giants, New Orleans Saints, Indianapolis Colts, and Atlanta Falcons.

== Early life ==
Washington attended Stamford High School in Stamford, Texas. As a senior, he had 73 receptions for 1,331 yards and 24 touchdowns as a receiver and 42 tackles and seven interceptions on defense, on route to a second straight state championship. He committed to Oklahoma State University to play college football. Washington also played tennis, basketball and ran track in high school.

== College career ==
As a true freshman at Oklahoma State in 2014, Washington played in all 13 games and had 28 receptions for 456 yards and six touchdowns. Playing in all 13 games again as a sophomore in 2015 he recorded 53 receptions for 1,087 and 10 touchdowns. As a junior in 2016, he had 71 receptions for 1,380 yards and 10 touchdowns. He was named Offensive MVP of the 2016 Alamo Bowl after recording nine receptions for 171 yards and a touchdown. Washington returned to Oklahoma State for his senior year, rather than enter the 2017 NFL draft. In 2017, Washington won the Biletnikoff Award for the nation's best wide receiver.

=== College statistics ===
Season	Team	GP	Receiving		
Season	Team	GP	Rec	Yds	TD
2014	Oklahoma State	13	28	457	6
2015	Oklahoma State	13	53	1,087	10
2016	Oklahoma State	13	71	1,380	10
2017	Oklahoma State	13	74	1,549	13
Totals		52	226	4,472	39

== Professional career ==
=== Pre-draft ===
On December 11, 2017, it was announced that Washington had accepted his invitation to play in the 2018 Senior Bowl. Washington impressed scouts and analysts during practices in preparation for the Senior Bowl. On January 27, 2018, Washington played in the Senior Bowl, but finished without a catch as a part of Houston Texans head coach Bill O'Brien's South team that defeated the North 45–16. Throughout the game he was covered by Jacksonville State's Siran Neal. He attended the NFL Scouting Combine in Indianapolis and completed all of the combine and positional drills. He finished 14th among all wide receivers in the short shuttle. On March 15, 2018, Washington participated at Oklahoma State's pro day and performed the 40-yard dash (4.50s), 20-yard dash (2.70s), 10-yard dash (1.61s), vertical jump (39"), and broad jump (10'2"). He also attended a pre-draft visit with the Dallas Cowboys. At the conclusion of the pre-draft process, Washington was projected to be a third-round pick by NFL draft experts and scouts. He was ranked the seventh best wide receiver prospect in the draft by Scouts Inc. and was ranked the ninth best wide receiver by DraftScout.com.

External videos
- NFL Draft Profile: James Washington
- James Washington's NFL Combine Workout
- James Washington runs the 40-yard dash

Pre-draft measurables
Height	Weight	Arm length	Hand span	Wingspan	40-yard dash	10-yard split	20-yard split	20-yard shuttle	Three-cone drill	Vertical jump	Broad jump	Bench press
5 ft 11 in (1.80 m)	203 lb (92 kg)	32 3/8 in (0.82 m)	9 3/4 in (0.25 m)	6 ft 6 1/4 in (1.99 m)	4.50 s	1.61 s	2.70 s	4.32 s	7.11 s	39.0 in (0.99 m)	10 ft 2 in (3.10 m)	14 reps
All values from NFL Combine/Pro Day

=== Pittsburgh Steelers ===
The Pittsburgh Steelers selected Washington in the second round (60th overall) of the 2018 NFL draft. He was the seventh wide receiver taken in the draft. His Oklahoma State teammate, quarterback Mason Rudolph, was selected by the Steelers in the third round (76th overall). On May 12, 2018, the Steelers signed Washington to a four-year, $4.50 million contract that includes a signing bonus of $1.35 million. In the Steelers' Week 2 loss to the Kansas City Chiefs, Washington recorded his first professional reception, which was a 14-yard touchdown. Washington finished his rookie season with 16 receptions for 217 yards and one touchdown.

External videos
- Steelers draft Washington 60th overall
- Instant Draft Grade: James Washington

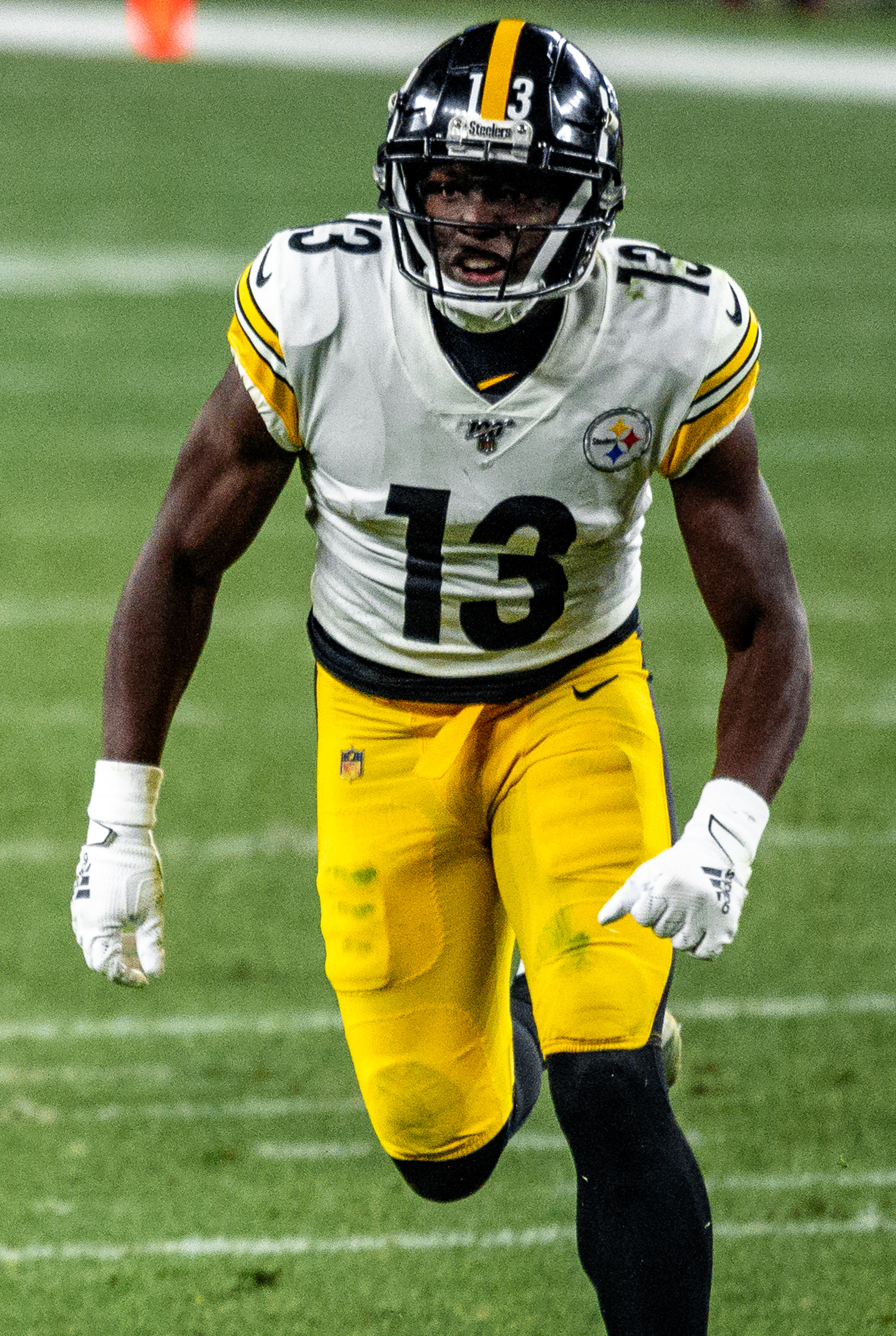
Washington in a game against the Cleveland Browns

In Week 10 of the 2019 season against the Los Angeles Rams, Washington caught a season high six passes for 90 yards and his first touchdown of the season in the 17–12 win. In Week 12 against the Cincinnati Bengals, Washington caught three passes for 98 yards including a 79-yard touchdown in the 16–10 win. During Week 13 against the Cleveland Browns, Washington finished with 111 receiving yards on four receptions, including a 30-yard touchdown, as the Steelers won 20–13. Overall, Washington finished the 2019 season with 44 receptions for 735 receiving yards and three receiving touchdowns.

Washington was placed on the reserve/COVID-19 list by the Steelers on August 2, 2020, and was activated five days later. In Week 1 against the New York Giants, Washington caught 2 passes for 34 yards and his first receiving touchdown of the season during the 26–16 win. In Week 6 against the Browns, Washington caught 4 passes for 68 yards and a receiving touchdown in a blowout 38–7 win.

=== Dallas Cowboys ===
On March 18, 2022, Washington signed a one-year contract with the Cowboys as a free agent, with the intention to help offset the losses of wide receivers Amari Cooper and Cedrick Wilson Jr. During training camp, Washington was carted off the practice field after suffering a fractured fifth metatarsal in his right foot. He was placed on injured reserve on August 31, 2022. He was activated from injured reserve on December 10, 2022. He appeared in 2 games as backup and did not register any statistics. He was released on January 4, 2023.

=== New York Giants ===
The Giants signed Washington to their practice squad on January 11, 2023. His practice squad contract with the team expired after the season on January 21.

=== New Orleans Saints ===
On May 15, 2023, Washington signed with the New Orleans Saints on a one-year deal. He was released on August 15, 2023, exactly three months after he was signed.

=== Indianapolis Colts ===
On August 18, 2023, Washington signed with the Indianapolis Colts, but was cut 10 days later on August 28.

=== Atlanta Falcons ===
On July 29, 2024, Washington signed with the Atlanta Falcons. He was released on August 18, 2024.

== NFL career statistics ==
Legend
**Bold**	Career high

=== Regular season ===
Year	Team	Games		Receiving					Rushing					Fumbles	
Year	Team	GP	GS	Rec	Yds	Avg	Lng	TD	Att	Yds	Avg	Lng	TD	Fum	Lost
2018	PIT	14	6	16	217	13.6	47	1	0	0	0.0	0	0	0	0
2019	PIT	15	10	**44**	**735**	**16.7**	**79**	3	0	0	0.0	0	0	**1**	**1**
2020	PIT	16	7	30	392	13.1	50	**5**	0	0	0.0	0	0	0	0
2021	PIT	15	2	24	285	11.9	42	2	**2**	**13**	**6.5**	**12**	0	0	0
2022	DAL	2	0	0	0	0.0	0	0	0	0	0.0	0	0	0	0
Total		62	25	114	1,629	14.3	79	11	2	13	6.5	12	0	1	1

=== Postseason ===
Year	Team	Games		Receiving					Rushing					Fumbles	
Year	Team	GP	GS	Rec	Yds	Avg	Lng	TD	Att	Yds	Avg	Lng	TD	Fum	Lost
2020	PIT	1	0	**5**	**72**	14.4	**27**	0	0	0	0.0	0	0	0	0
2021	PIT	1	0	2	37	**18.5**	22	**1**	0	0	0.0	0	0	0	0
Total		2	0	7	109	15.6	27	1	0	0	0.0	0	0	0	0
