= Justin Phillips (American football) =

American football player (born 1995)

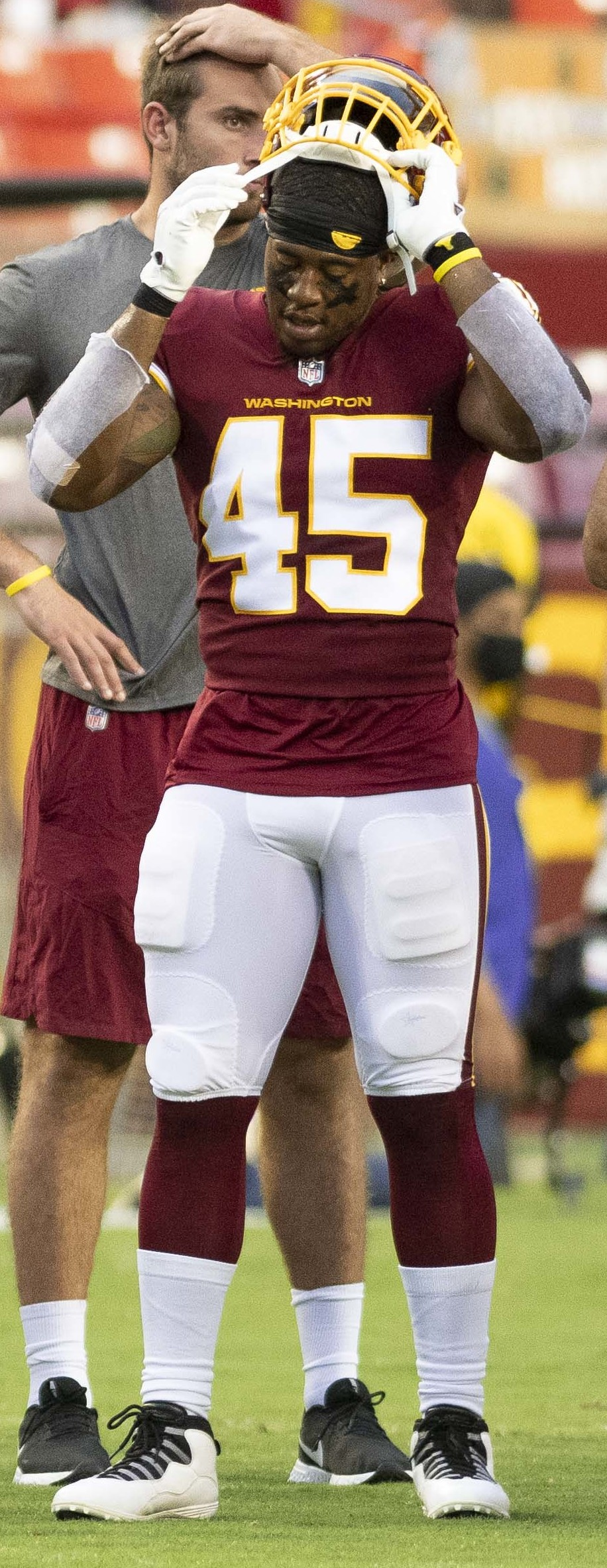
- Phillips with Washington Football Team in 2021

No. 56, 48
- Position: Linebacker

Personal information
- Born: October 10, 1995 (age 31); Houston, Texas, U.S.
- Listed height: 6 ft 0 in (1.83 m)
- Listed weight: 235 lb (107 kg)

Career information
- High school: Pearland (Pearland, Texas)
- College: Oklahoma State (2014–2018)
- NFL draft: 2019: undrafted

Career history
- Dallas Cowboys (2019)*; Oakland / Las Vegas Raiders (2019); Washington Football Team (2020–2021)*; Calgary Stampeders (2021)
- * Offseason or practice squad member only

Career NFL statistics
- Total tackles: 7
- Stats at Pro Football Reference
- Stats at CFL.ca

Justin Phillips (born October 10, 1995) is an American former professional football player who was a linebacker in the National Football League (NFL). He played college football for the Oklahoma State Cowboys.

== Early life ==
Phillips attended Pearland High School. As a senior, he posted 86 tackles (11 for loss), 2 sacks, 2 interceptions, one forced fumble and 2 fumble recoveries. In the Texas 5A state championship game Tre LeDay forced a fumble that he returned 88-yards.

He received Houston Chronicle defensive player of the year, Associated Press Sports Editors honorable-mention Class 5A All-state team, All-Greater Houston, district 22-5A defensive player of the year, All-district and Texas High School Football All-elite Class 5A Region III honors.

A 3-star recruit, Phillips committed to Oklahoma State over offers from Baylor, Boise State, Colorado, Iowa State, and Northwestern.

== College career ==
As a true freshman at Oklahoma State, Phillips appeared in 8 games and missed 5 with an injury. He played mostly on special teams, covering kickoffs and making 6 tackles. He had 10 defensive tackles against the University of Oklahoma. In 2015, he was redshirted.

As a sophomore, he appeared in all 13 games at middle linebacker, tallying 42 tackles (fourth on the team), 2 sacks and one interception. He started against Texas Tech University and the University of Oklahoma. He had 14 tackles, one sack and one forced fumble against Texas Tech University.

As a junior, he appeared in all 13 games at outside linebacker, registering 64 tackles (third on the team), 9.5 tackles for loss (third on the team), 42 solo tackles, 2.5 sacks, 2 quarterback hurries, 2 interceptions, 2 pass breakups and 3 forced fumbles (led the team). He returned interceptions for touchdowns in back-to-back games against the University of South Alabama and the University of Pittsburgh.

As a senior, he was moved back to middle linebacker and was named team captain. He recorded 98 tackles (led the team), 11 tackles for loss (second on the team), 2 sacks, 5 quarterback hurries, 3 pass breakups, one forced fumble and one fumble recovery. He had 12 tackles against Kansas State University and Texas Christian University.

He finished his college career with 221 tackles (23 for loss), 6.5 sacks, 3 interceptions (2 returned for touchdowns), 6 passes defensed, 6 forced fumbles and 2 fumble recoveries in 42 games.

== Professional career ==
=== Dallas Cowboys ===
Phillips was signed by the Dallas Cowboys as an undrafted free agent after the 2019 NFL draft on April 30. On June 18, he was released. On July 31, he was re-signed because of injuries on the linebacking corps. He was waived on August 31, 2019.

=== Oakland / Las Vegas Raiders ===
On September 2, 2019, Phillips was signed to the Oakland Raiders' practice squad. On September 25, he was promoted to the active roster to provide depth because of injuries at linebacker and the 12-game suspension of Vontaze Burfict. He appeared in 4 games as a backup, posting 4 tackles (2 solo) on defense and 3 tackles on special teams. On October 29, he was waived with an injury settlement after suffering a season ending knee injury in the seventh game against the Houston Texans.

Phillips was re-signed by the Las Vegas Raiders on May 6, 2020. He was waived on September 5, 2020.

=== Washington Football Team ===
Phillips signed with the Washington Football Team's practice squad on November 5, 2020. He signed a reserve/futures contract with the team on January 13, 2021; and was released on August 24, 2021.

=== Calgary Stampeders ===
On September 29, 2021, it was announced that Phillips had signed with the Calgary Stampeders. He was released on November 29, 2021.
