= Josh Jackson (quarterback) =

American football player (born 1998)

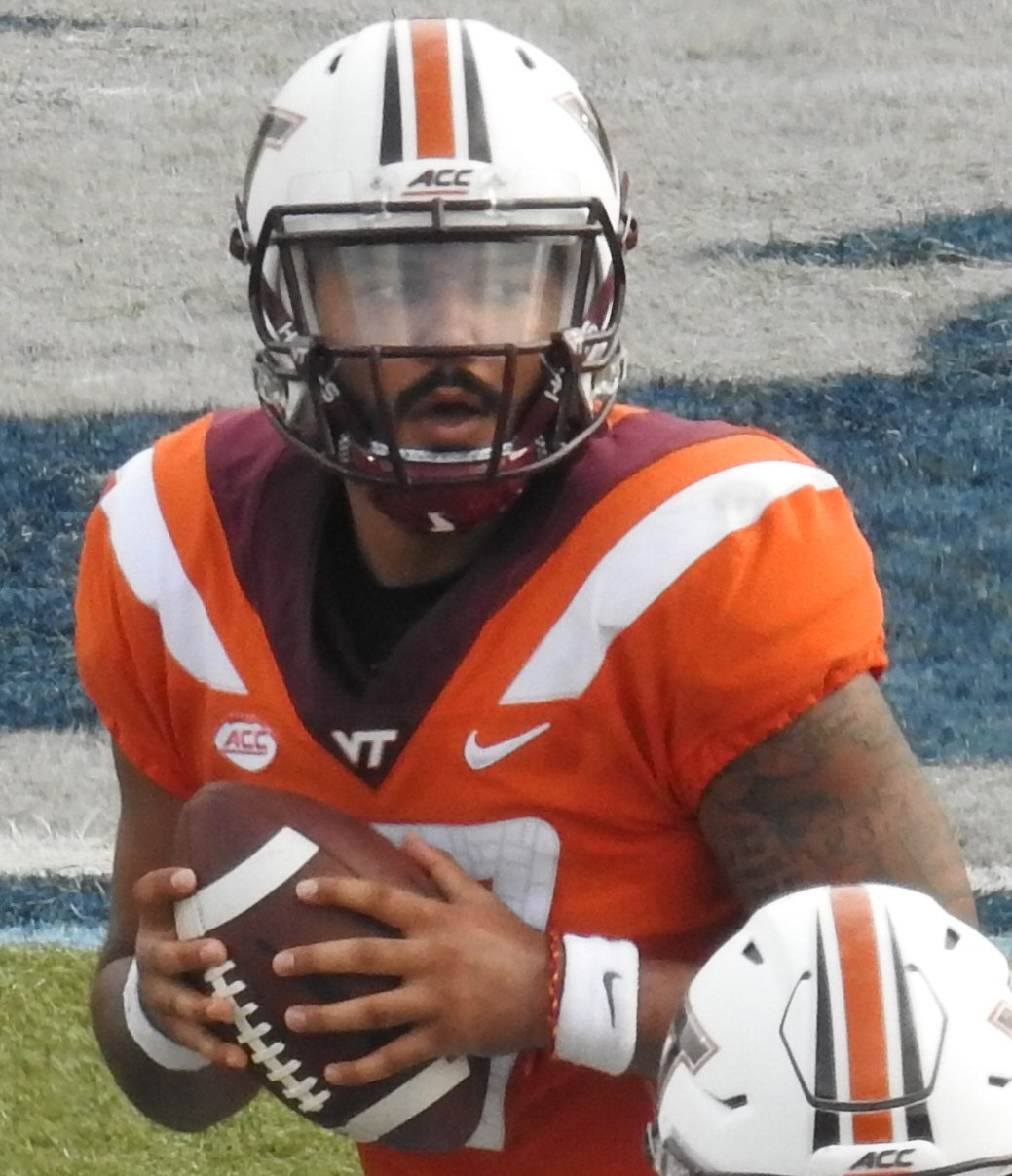
- Jackson in 2018

Profile
- Position: Quarterback

Personal information
- Born: January 20, 1998 (age 28); Ann Arbor, Michigan, U.S.
- Listed height: 6 ft 2 in (1.88 m)
- Listed weight: 215 lb (98 kg)

Career information
- High school: Saline (MI)
- College: Virginia Tech (2016–2018); Maryland (2019–2020)
- Stats at ESPN

Joshua Anthony Jackson (born January 20, 1998) is an American former football quarterback for Virginia Tech and Maryland.

== Early life ==
Jackson originally attended Huron High School in Ann Arbor, Michigan before transferring to Saline High School in Saline, Michigan. As a senior, he passed for 1,780 yards and 20 touchdowns. He committed to Virginia Tech to play college football.

== College career ==
=== Virginia Tech ===
After redshirting his first year at Virginia Tech in 2016, Jackson was named the starting quarterback in 2017. In his first career game, he passed for 235 yards and one touchdown and rushed for 101 yards and a touchdown. Jackson fractured his left fibula in the third game of the 2018 season against ODU. Because of this injury, Jackson would remain benched for the rest of the season. On January 23, 2019, Josh Jackson announced his intention to transfer from Virginia Tech. During his time as starting quarterback at Virginia Tech, Jackson played in 16 games, throwing over 3,566 yards for 25 touchdowns and 10 interceptions.

=== Maryland ===
On February 18, 2019, Jackson announced his commitment to Maryland where he was granted immediate eligibility to play because of the NCAA's graduate transfer policy. Jackson was named starting quarterback for the 2019 Maryland Terrapins.
