= 2017 Wake Forest Demon Deacons football team =

American college football season

2017 Wake Forest Demon Deacons football

Belk Bowl champion

Belk Bowl, W 55–52 vs. Texas A&M
- Conference: Atlantic Coast Conference
- Atlantic Division
- Record: 8–5 (4–4 ACC)
- Head coach: Dave Clawson (4th season)
- Offensive coordinator: Warren Ruggiero (4th season)
- Offensive scheme: Slow mesh
- Defensive coordinator: Jay Sawvel (1st season)
- Base defense: 4–3
- Captains: Grant Dawson; Wendell Dunn; Cam Serigne; A'Lique Terry; Jaboree Williams; John Wolford
- Home stadium: BB&T Field

2017 Atlantic Coast Conference football standings
	Conf.			Overall
Team	W		L	W		L
Atlantic Division
No. 4 Clemson xy$^	7	–	1	12	–	2
No. 23 NC State	6	–	2	9	–	4
Wake Forest	4	–	4	8	–	5
Louisville	4	–	4	8	–	5
Boston College	4	–	4	7	–	6
Florida State	3	–	5	7	–	6
Syracuse	2	–	6	4	–	8
Coastal Division
No. 13 Miami (FL) xy	7	–	1	10	–	3
No. 24 Virginia Tech	5	–	3	9	–	4
Georgia Tech	4	–	4	5	–	6
Virginia	3	–	5	6	–	7
Pittsburgh	3	–	5	5	–	7
Duke	3	–	5	7	–	6
North Carolina	1	–	7	3	–	9
Championship: Clemson 38, Miami 3
^ – College Football Playoff participant; $ – Conference champion; x – Division champion/co-champions; y – Championship game participant; Rankings from AP Poll

The 2017 Wake Forest Demon Deacons football team represented Wake Forest University during the 2017 NCAA Division I FBS football season. The team was led by fourth-year head coach Dave Clawson, and played their home games at BB&T Field. Wake Forest competed in the Atlantic Division of the Atlantic Coast Conference as they have since the league's inception in 1953. They finished the season 8–5, 4–4 in ACC play to finish in a three-way tie for third place in the Atlantic Division. They were invited to the Belk Bowl, where they defeated Texas A&M.

== Recruits ==
College recruiting (2017)
Name	Hometown	School	Height	Weight	Commit date
Michael Allen; DE	Sugar Hill, GA	Lanier County HS	6 ft 6 in (1.98 m)	232 lb (105 kg)	Aug 8, 2016
Michael Allen; DE	Recruit ratings: Scout: Rivals: 247Sports: ESPN:				
Christian Beal; RB	Winston-Salem, NC	East Forsyth HS	5 ft 9 in (1.75 m)	190 lb (86 kg)	Jul 18, 2015
Christian Beal; RB	Recruit ratings: Scout: Rivals: 247Sports: ESPN:				
Tayvon Bowers; QB	Harrisburg, PA	Bishop McDevitt HS	6 ft 2 in (1.88 m)	205 lb (93 kg)	May 11, 2016
Tayvon Bowers; QB	Recruit ratings: Scout: Rivals: 247Sports: ESPN:				
Jeffery Burley; LB	Jackson, GA	Jackson HS	6 ft 2 in (1.88 m)	214 lb (97 kg)	Jul 18, 2016
Jeffery Burley; LB	Recruit ratings: Scout: Rivals: 247Sports: ESPN:				
Spencer Clapp; OL	Gibsonville, NC	Eastern Guilford HS	6 ft 5 in (1.96 m)	250 lb (110 kg)	Feb 1, 2017
Spencer Clapp; OL	Recruit ratings: Scout: Rivals: 247Sports: ESPN:				
Coby Davis; CB	Washington, D.C.	Maret School	6 ft 1 in (1.85 m)	175 lb (79 kg)	Jun 28, 2016
Coby Davis; CB	Recruit ratings: Scout: Rivals: 247Sports: ESPN:				
Tyriq Hardimon; DB	Marietta, GA	Lassiter HS	6 ft 0 in (1.83 m)	185 lb (84 kg)	Jan 16, 2017
Tyriq Hardimon; DB	Recruit ratings: Scout: Rivals: 247Sports: ESPN:				
Waydale Jones; WR	Beeville, TX	A. C. Jones HS	6 ft 4 in (1.93 m)	195 lb (88 kg)	Jan 25, 2017
Waydale Jones; WR	Recruit ratings: Scout: Rivals: 247Sports: ESPN:				
Sean Maginn; OL	Suwanee, GA	North Gwinnett HS	6 ft 4 in (1.93 m)	270 lb (120 kg)	Jan 22, 2017
Sean Maginn; OL	Recruit ratings: Scout: Rivals: 247Sports: ESPN:				
Chase Monroe; LB	Davidson, NC	Davidson Day School	6 ft 2 in (1.88 m)	215 lb (98 kg)	Jul 29, 2016
Chase Monroe; LB	Recruit ratings: Scout: Rivals: 247Sports: ESPN:				
Loic Nya; OL	Silver Spring, MD	Springbrook HS	6 ft 3 in (1.91 m)	265 lb (120 kg)	May 24, 2016
Loic Nya; OL	Recruit ratings: Scout: Rivals: 247Sports: ESPN:				
Allan Rappleyea; OL	Milton, MA	Milton HS	6 ft 5 in (1.96 m)	265 lb (120 kg)	Apr 23, 2016
Allan Rappleyea; OL	Recruit ratings: Scout: Rivals: 247Sports: ESPN:				
Jaquarii Roberson; WR	Ahoskie, NC	Hertford County HS	6 ft 3 in (1.91 m)	165 lb (75 kg)	Aug 1, 2016
Jaquarii Roberson; WR	Recruit ratings: Scout: Rivals: 247Sports: ESPN:				
Troy Simon; DB	Milton, GA	Milton HS	6 ft 0 in (1.83 m)	190 lb (86 kg)	Jun 22, 2016
Troy Simon; DB	Recruit ratings: Scout: Rivals: 247Sports: ESPN:				
Jake Simpson; LB	Buford, GA	Buford HS	6 ft 2 in (1.88 m)	205 lb (93 kg)	Feb 20, 2016
Jake Simpson; LB	Recruit ratings: Scout: Rivals: 247Sports: ESPN:				
Sage Surratt; WR	Lincolnton, NC	East Lincoln HS	6 ft 2 in (1.88 m)	185 lb (84 kg)	Jan 17, 2017
Sage Surratt; WR	Recruit ratings: Scout: Rivals: 247Sports: ESPN:				
D. J. Taylor; LB	Huntland, TN	Huntland HS	6 ft 2 in (1.88 m)	215 lb (98 kg)	Jun 15, 2016
D. J. Taylor; LB	Recruit ratings: Scout: Rivals: 247Sports: ESPN:				
Ja'Sir Taylor; WR	Brick, NJ	Brick Township HS	6 ft 0 in (1.83 m)	180 lb (82 kg)	Jan 19, 2017
Ja'Sir Taylor; WR	Recruit ratings: Scout: Rivals: 247Sports: ESPN:				
Zach Tom; OL	Baton Rouge, LA	Catholic HS	6 ft 4 in (1.93 m)	270 lb (120 kg)	Dec 5, 2016
Zach Tom; OL	Recruit ratings: Scout: Rivals: 247Sports: ESPN:				
Tyler Williams; DT	West Palm Beach, FL	Oxbridge Academy of the Palm Beaches	6 ft 1 in (1.85 m)	280 lb (130 kg)	Jul 9, 2016
Tyler Williams; DT	Recruit ratings: Scout: Rivals: 247Sports: ESPN:				
Overall recruit ranking: Scout: 73 Rivals: 74 247Sports: 68 ESPN: 65
Note: In many cases, Scout, Rivals, 247Sports, On3, and ESPN may conflict in their listings of height and weight.; In these cases, the average was taken. ESPN grades are on a 100-point scale.; Sources: "2017 Wake Forest Football Commitments". Rivals.; "2017 Wake Forest Commits". Scout.; "2017 Player Commitments – Wake Forest". ESPN.; "Scout.com Team Recruiting Rankings". Scout.; "2017 Team Ranking". Rivals.com.

== Schedule ==
Date	Time	Opponent	Site	TV	Result	Attendance
August 31	6:30 p.m.	Presbyterian*	BB&T Field; Winston-Salem, NC	ACCN Extra	W 51–7	22,643
September 9	1:00 p.m.	at Boston College	Alumni Stadium; Chestnut Hill, MA	ACCN Extra	W 34–10	38,082
September 16	3:00 p.m.	Utah State*^{†}	BB&T Field; Winston-Salem, NC	ACCN Extra	W 46–10	27,971
September 23	3:30 p.m.	at Appalachian State*	Kidd Brewer Stadium; Boone, NC	ESPN3	W 20–19	35,126
September 30	3:30 p.m.	Florida State	BB&T Field; Winston-Salem, NC	ABC	L 19–26	31,588
October 7	12:00 p.m.	at No. 2 Clemson	Memorial Stadium; Clemson, SC	ESPN2	L 14–28	80,567
October 21	7:30 p.m.	at Georgia Tech	Bobby Dodd Stadium; Atlanta, GA	ESPNU	L 24–38	45,224
October 28	12:20 p.m.	Louisville	BB&T Field; Winston-Salem, NC	ACCN	W 42–32	29,593
November 4	3:30 p.m.	at No. 5 Notre Dame*	Notre Dame Stadium; Notre Dame, IN	NBC	L 37–48	77,622
November 11	3:00 p.m.	at Syracuse	Carrier Dome; Syracuse, NY	ACCRSN	W 64–43	38,539
November 18	7:30 p.m.	No. 25 NC State	BB&T Field; Winston-Salem, NC (rivalry)	ESPNU	W 30–24	31,803
November 25	12:30 p.m.	Duke	BB&T Field; Winston-Salem, NC (rivalry)	ACCRSN	L 23–31	27,016
December 29	1:00 p.m.	vs. Texas A&M*	Bank of America Stadium; Charlotte, NC (Belk Bowl)	ESPN	W 55–52	32,784
*Non-conference game; ^{†}Homecoming; Rankings from AP Poll released prior to the game; All times are in Eastern time

== Coaching staff ==
Position	Name	First Year at Wake
Head coach	Dave Clawson	2014
Offensive coordinator / quarterbacks	Warren Ruggiero	2014
Asst head coach / Receivers	Kevin Higgins	2014
Defensive coordinator / Cornerbacks	Jay Sawvel	2017
Special teams coordinator / tight ends	Wayne Lineburg	2017
Defensive line	Dave Cohen	2014
Running backs	John Hunter	2014
Offensive line	Nick Tabacca	2014
Safeties	Lyle Hemphill	2017
Outside linebackers	Brad Sherrod	2017

== Roster ==
2017 Wake Forest Demon Deacons football team roster
Quarterbacks: 2 Kendall Hinton – sophomore (6'0, 195) (redshirt); 10 John Wolford – senior (6'1, 200); 11 Kyle Driscoll – junior (6'1, 205) (redshirt); 12 Jamie Newman – freshman (6'4, 235) (redshirt); 13 Tayvone Bowers – freshman (6'1, 225); 18 Matthew Considine – freshman (6'6, 195); Running backs: 5 Arkeem Byrd – freshman (6'1, 190) (redshirt); 20 Tyler Bell – junior (5'11, 210); 21 Isaiah Robinson – junior (5'10, 220) (redshirt); 22 Matt Colburn II – junior (5'10, 200); 26 Christian Beal – freshman (5'10, 180); 34 Will Drawdy – freshman (6'0, 180); 36 Cade Carney – sophomore (5'11, 215); 49 Trey Ndlovu – sophomore (5'7, 230) (redshirt); Wide receivers: 1 Tabari Hines – junior (5'10, 175); 7 Scotty Washington – junior (6'5, 225) (redshirt); 9 Chuck Wade, Jr. – junior (6'0, 200); 14 Sage Surratt – freshman (6'3, 210); 15 Cortez Lewis – junior (6'1, 205) (redshirt); 17 Alex Bachman – junior (6'0, 190); 25 James Sriraman– sophomore (6'3, 200) (redshirt); 80 Waydale Jones – freshman (6'4, 185); 81 Ian Driscoll – freshman (5'10, 175); 82 Jaquarii Roberson – freshman (6'1, 165); 83 Davis Johnson – freshman (5'11, 180) (redshirt); 88 Steven Claude – sophomore (6'2, 195) (redshirt); 89 Greg Dortch – freshman (5'9, 180) (redshirt); Tight ends: 23 Brandon Chapman – freshman (6'5, 250) (redshirt); 41 Devin Pike – senior (6'6, 250); 44 LaRonde' Liverpool – freshman (6'3, 245) (redshirt); 84 Jaren Lubrano – freshman (6'1, 200); 85 Cam Serigne – senior (6'3, 240) (redshirt); 86 Jack Freudenthal – sophomore (6'3, 230) (redshirt); 87 Thomas Cole – freshman (6'5, 250) (redshirt); Punters: 7 Mike Weaver – senior (6'1, 190) (redshirt); 48 Dom Maggio – sophomore (6'3, 185)	Offensive lineman: 55 A'Lique Terry – senior (6'1, 275); 56 Spencer Clapp – freshman (6'6, 280); 58 Tyler Watson – freshman (6'5, 290) (redshirt); 59 Loic Nya – freshman (6'3, 275); 60 Taleni Suhren – freshman (6'5, 290) (redshirt); 63 Je'Vionte' Nash – freshman (6'3, 285) (redshirt); 65 Zach Tom – freshman (6'4, 290); 66 Goran Jovanovic – freshman (6'4, 295); 68 Patrick Osterhage – junior (6'4, 290) (redshirt); 70 Ryan Anderson – junior (6'6, 305) (redshirt); 71 Nathan Gilliam – sophomore (6'5, 290) (redshirt); 73 Jake Benzinger – freshman (6'7, 295) (redshirt); 74 Phil Haynes – sophomore (6'4, 305) (redshirt); 75 Justin Herron – junior (6'5, 290) (redshirt); 76 Allan Rappleyea – freshman (6'5, 270); 79 Sean Maginn – freshman (6'3, 280); Defensive lineman: 14 Wendell Dunn – senior (6'3, 250) (redshirt); 18 Carlos Basham Jr. – freshman (6'5, 275) (redshirt); 38 Zander Zimmer – freshman (6'4, 235) (redshirt); 45 Paris Black – sophomore (6'3, 255) (redshirt); 48 Willie Yarbary – sophomore (6'2, 285) (redshirt); 51 Chris Calhoun – junior (6'4, 250); 53 Duke Ejiofor – senior (6'4, 275) (redshirt); 54 Elontae Bateman – sophomore (6'2, 290) (redshirt); 56 Deon Young – graduate (6'1, 315); 90 Sulaiman Kamara – freshman (6'2, 290) (redshirt); 91 Mike Allen – freshman (6'5, 235); 92 Adam Winter – freshman (6'3, 250); 93 Zeek Rodney – junior (6'1, 305) (redshirt); 94 Manny Walker – freshman (6'4, 230) (redshirt); 95 Connor Hebbeler – freshman (6'2, 250); Placekickers: 7 Mike Weaver – senior (6'1, 190) (redshirt); 88 Zach Murphy – freshman (6'0, 180); 97 Ben Brown – sophomore (6'2, 170) (redshirt)	Linebackers: 6 Jaboree Williams – senior (6'0, 245); 23 Justin Strnad – sophomore (6'1, 230) (redshirt); 30 Ja'Cquez Williams – freshman (6'2, 210) (redshirt); 32 Jeff Burley – freshman (6'2, 230); 34 Demetrius Kemp – junior (6'1, 220) (redshirt); 35 Nate Mays – sophomore (6'1, 225) (redshirt); 42 Jake Simpson – freshman (6'0, 210); 43 Connor Miller – freshman (6'2, 225) (redshirt); 44 Kalin McNeil – junior (6'1, 220) (redshirt); 46 DJ Taylor – freshman (6'1, 225); 50 Grant Dawson – senior (6'1, 225) (redshirt); 58 Chase Monroe – freshman (6'2, 210); 96 Jack Rielly – freshman (5'10, 190); 99 Augustus Fortune – freshman (6'0, 215) (redshirt); Defensive backs: 2 Cam Glenn – junior (6'1, 200) (redshirt); 3 Jessie Bates – sophomore (6'2, 195) (redshirt); 4 Amari Henderson – sophomore (6'1, 185) (redshirt); 5 Cedric Jiles – graduate (5'10, 180); 12 Luke Masterson – freshman (6'2, 210) (redshirt); 13 Malik Grate – freshman (6'0, 170) (redshirt); 17 Traveon Redd – sophomore (6'0, 195); 20 Coby Davis – freshman (5'11, 185); 21 Essang Bassey – sophomore (5'10, 185); 24 Ja'Sir Taylor – freshman (5'10, 180); 25 Troy Simon – freshman (6'0, 190); 27 Tyriq Hardimon – freshman (6'0, 200); 28 Christopher Pearcey – freshman (5'11, 200) (redshirt); 29 DeAndre' Delaney – freshman (6'3, 210) (redshirt); 37 Thomas Dillon – junior (5'10, 180) (redshirt); 39 Keegan Good – freshman (6'0, 190) (redshirt); 40 Justin Bartee – freshman (5'10, 210) (redshirt); Long snappers: 15 Garrett Wilson – junior (6'3, 210); 52 Dayton Diemel – sophomore (5'10, 215)

== Game summaries ==
=== Presbyterian ===
Week One: Presbyterian Blue Hose at Wake Forest Demon Deacons – Game summary

Quarter	1	2	3	4	Total
Blue Hose	0	0	0	7	7
Demon Deacons	16	21	14	0	51

at BB&T Field • Winston-Salem, North Carolina

- Date: August 31
- Game time: 6:30 p.m. EDT
- Game weather: 72 °F (22 °C) • WSW 4 mph (6.4 km/h) • Overcast, some rain
- Game attendance: 22,643
- Referee: Tra Blake
- TV announcers (ACC Net. Extra): Play-by-Play: Shawn Kenney • Color Analyst: Al Groh

Game information

First quarter

- 11:18 WAKE – Cam Serigne 8-yard pass from John Wolford (Mike Weaver kick failed), Demon Deacons 6–0. Drive: 5 plays, 33 yards, TOP 1:30
- 7:48 WAKE – Cam Serigne 26-yard pass from John Wolford (Mike Weaver kick), Demon Deacons 13–0. Drive: 6 plays, 63 yards, TOP 1:41
- 0:34 WAKE – Mike Weaver 41-yard field goal, Demon Deacons 16–0. Drive: 15 plays, 71 yards, TOP 5:00

Second quarter

- 11:29 WAKE – John Wolford 2-yard run (Mike Weaver kick), Demon Deacons 23–0. Drive: 6 plays, 33 yards, TOP 1:52
- 8:25 WAKE – Greg Dortch 7-yard pass from John Wolford (Mike Weaver kick), Demon Deacons 30–0. Drive: 1 play, 7 yards, TOP 0:07
- 4:15 WAKE – Greg Dortch 42-yard pass from Kendall Hinton (Mike Weaver kick), Demon Deacons 37–0. Drive: 5 plays, 75 yards, TOP 2:07

Third quarter

- 11:51 WAKE – Alex Bachman 29-yard pass from Kendall Hinton (Mike Weaver kick), Demon Deacons 44–0. Drive: 8 plays, 81 yards, TOP 3:09
- 1:39 WAKE – Kendall Hinton 1-yard run (Mike Weaver kick), Demon Deacons 51–0. Drive: 9 plays, 88 yards, TOP 2:54

Fourth quarter

- 8:23 PRES – Mark Robinson 14-yard run (Brett Norton kick), Demon Deacons 51–7. Drive: 5 plays, 91 yards, TOP 2:45

Statistics	PRES	WAKE
First downs	12	28
Total yards	248	487
Rushing yards	207	248
Passing yards	41	239
Turnovers	1	1
Time of possession	32:21	27:39

Team	Category	Player	Statistics
Presbyterian	Passing	Ben Cheek	2/9, 41 yards, INT
Presbyterian	Rushing	C. J. Marable	16 rushes, 162 yards
Presbyterian	Receiving	DarQuez Watson	1 reception, 30 yards
Wake Forest	Passing	Kendall Hinton	7/8, 124 yards, 2 TD
Wake Forest	Rushing	Arkeem Byrd	7 rushes, 75 yards
Wake Forest	Receiving	Greg Dortch	4 receptions, 55 yards, 2 TD

=== At Boston College ===
Week Two: Wake Forest Demon Deacons at Boston College Eagles – Game summary

Quarter	1	2	3	4	Total
Demon Deacons	7	14	10	3	34
Eagles	0	7	3	0	10

at Alumni Stadium • Chestnut Hill, Massachusetts

- Date: September 9
- Game time: 1:00 p.m. EDT
- Game weather: 68 °F (20 °C) • SE 2 mph (3.2 km/h) • Partly Sunny
- Game attendance: 38,082
- Referee: Gary Patterson
- TV announcers (ACC Net. Extra): Play-by-Play: Robert Lee • Color Analyst: Matt Chatham

Game information

First Quarter

- 1:28 WAKE – Greg Dortch 9-yard pass from John Wolford (Mike Weaver kick), Demon Deacons 7–0. Drive: 4 plays, 26 yards, TOP 1:17

Second Quarter

- 10:20 WAKE – John Wolford 29-yard run (Mike Weaver kick), Demon Deacons 14–0. Drive: 8 plays, 64 yards, TOP 2:56
- 3:13 BC – Jon Hilliman 6-yard pass from Anthony Brown (Colton Lichtenberg kick), Demon Deacons 14–7. Drive: 8 plays, 57 yards, TOP 3:27
- 1:36 WAKE – Essang Bassey 30-yard interception return (Mike Weaver kick), Demon Deacons 21–7. Drive: 2 plays, 6 yards, TOP 0:29

Third Quarter

- 10:03 BC – Colton Lichtenberg 30-yard field goal, Demon Deacons 21–10. Drive: 7 plays, 51 yards, TOP 2:29
- 6:15 WAKE – Mike Weaver 28-yard field goal, Demon Deacons 24–10. Drive: 12 plays, 65 yards, TOP 3:48
- 4:23 WAKE – Cade Carney 3-yard run (Mike Weaver kick), Demon Deacons 31–10. Drive: 2 plays, 2 yards, TOP 0:46

Fourth Quarter

- 7:00 WAKE – Mike Weaver 27-yard field goal, Demon Deacons 34–10. Drive: 13 plays, 68 yards, TOP 7:46

Statistics	WAKE	BC
First downs	15	19
Total yards	309	305
Rushing yards	158	142
Passing yards	151	163
Turnovers	0	4
Time of possession	33:13	26:47

Team	Category	Player	Statistics
Wake Forest	Passing	John Wolford	13/19, 151 yards, TD
Wake Forest	Rushing	John Wolford	20 rushes, 92 yards, TD
Wake Forest	Receiving	Greg Dortch	6 receptions, 56 yards, TD
Boston College	Passing	Anthony Brown Jr.	11/29, 119 yards, TD, 3 INT
Boston College	Rushing	Thadd Smith	5 rushes, 46 yards
Boston College	Receiving	Jeff Smith	5 receptions, 56 yards

=== Utah State ===
Week Three: Utah State Aggies at Wake Forest Demon Deacons – Game summary

Quarter	1	2	3	4	Total
Aggies	0	0	10	0	10
Demon Deacons	14	15	17	0	46

at BB&T Field • Winston-Salem, North Carolina

- Date: September 16
- Game time: 3:00 p.m. EDT
- Game weather: 82 °F (28 °C) • N 4 mph (6.4 km/h) • Partly cloudy
- Game attendance: 27,971
- Referee: Riley Johnson
- TV announcers (ACC Net. Extra): Play-by-Play: Bill Roth • Color Analyst: Christian Ponder

Game information

First Quarter

- 13:11 WAKE – Greg Dortch 43-yard pass from John Wolford (Mike Weaver kick), Demon Deacons 7–0. Drive: 1 play, 43 yards, TOP 0:08
- 11:39 WAKE – Cam Serigne 45-yard pass from John Wolford (Mike Weaver kick), Demon Deacons 14–0. Drive: 5 plays, 70 yards, TOP 1:02

Second Quarter

- 14:14 WAKE – Mike Weaver 31-yard field goal, Demon Deacons 17–0. Drive: 9 plays, 46 yards, TOP 3:01
- 6:02 WAKE – Carlos Basham Jr. Safety, Demon Deacons 19–0. Drive: 1 play, -1 yard, TOP 0:05
- 4:50 WAKE – Arkeem Byrd 59-yard run (Mike Weaver kick), Demon Deacons 26–0. Drive: 3 plays, 68 yards, TOP 1:12
- 0:00 WAKE – Mike Weaver 30-yard field goal, Demon Deacons 29–0. Drive: 9 plays, 59 yards, TOP 1:13

Third Quarter

- 11:45 WAKE – Matt Colburn 1-yard run (Mike Weaver kick), Demon Deacons 36–0. Drive: 1 play, 1 yard, TOP 0:04
- 10:37 USU – Gerold Bright 77-yard pass from Jordan Love (Dominik Eberle kick), Demon Deacons 36–7. Drive: 3 plays, 76 yards, TOP 1:08
- 9:09 WAKE – John Wolford 18-yard run (Mike Weaver kick), Demon Deacons 43–7. Drive: 5 plays, 92 yards, TOP 1:28
- 2:49 WAKE – Mike Weaver 32-yard field goal, Demon Deacons 46–7. Drive: 11 plays, 55 yards, 5:14
- 0:53 USU – Dominik Eberle 30-yard field goal, Demon Deacons 46–10. Drive: 6 plays, 66 yards, 1:56

Statistics	USU	WAKE
First downs	11	26
Total yards	267	588
Rushing yards	42	291
Passing yards	225	297
Turnovers	1	0
Time of possession	24:00	36:00

Team	Category	Player	Statistics
Utah State	Passing	Jordan Love	6/13, 171 yards, TD
Utah State	Rushing	Eltoro Allen	13 rushes, 20 yards
Utah State	Receiving	Gerold Bright	1 reception, 77 yards, TD
Wake Forest	Passing	John Wolford	12/22, 242 yards, 2 TD
Wake Forest	Rushing	Arkeem Byrd	19 rushes, 120 yards, TD
Wake Forest	Receiving	Tabari Hines	5 receptions, 129 yards

=== At Appalachian State ===
Week Four: Wake Forest Demon Deacons at Appalachian State Mountaineers – Game summary

Quarter	1	2	3	4	Total
Demon Deacons	3	0	14	3	20
Mountaineers	6	3	7	3	19

at Kidd Brewer Stadium • Boone, North Carolina

- Date: September 23
- Game time: 3:30 p.m. EDT
- Game weather: 79 °F (26 °C) • SE 5 mph (8.0 km/h) • Partly Cloudy
- Game attendance: 35,126
- Referee: Kevin Stine
- TV announcers (ESPN3): Play-by-Play: Shawn Kenney • Color Analyst: Stan Lewter

Game information

First Quarter

- 11:04 WAKE – Mike Weaver 27-yard field goal, Demon Deacons 3–0. Drive: 11 plays, 65 yards, TOP 3:56
- 2:49 APP – Levi Duffield 20-yard pass from Taylor Lamb (Michael Rubino kick blocked), Mountaineers 6–3. Drive: 7 plays, 49 yards, TOP 3:07

Second Quarter

- 1:58 APP – Michael Rubino 38-yard field goal, Mountaineers 9–3. Drive: 8 plays, 52 yards, TOP 3:43

Third Quarter

- 7:52 WAKE – Greg Dortch 10-yard pass from John Wolford (Mike Weaver kick), Demon Deacons 10–9. Drive: 9 plays, 97 yards, TOP 3:13
- 7:02 APP – T.J. Watkins 84-yard pass from Taylor Lamb (Michael Rubino kick), Mountaineers 16–10. Drive: 2 plays, 82 yards, TOP 0:46
- 3:24 WAKE – Cam Serigne 6-yard pass from John Wolford (Mike Weaver kick), Demon Deacons 17–16. Drive: 10 plays, 75 yards, TOP 3:38

Fourth Quarter

- 10:35 APP – Michael Rubino 39-yard field goal, Mountaineers 19–17. Drive: 5 plays, 36 yards, TOP 1:52
- 7:22 WAKE – Mike Weaver 25-yard field goal, Demon Deacons 20–19. Drive: 10 plays, 71 yards, TOP 3:06

Statistics	WAKE	APP
First downs	18	27
Total yards	344	494
Rushing yards	168	122
Passing yards	176	372
Turnovers	0	0
Time of possession	24:16	35:44

Team	Category	Player	Statistics
Wake Forest	Passing	John Wolford	14/27, 176 yards, 2 TD
Wake Forest	Rushing	John Wolford	13 rushes, 77 yards
Wake Forest	Receiving	Scotty Washington	4 receptions, 79 yards
Appalachian State	Passing	Taylor Lamb	26/50, 372 yards, 2 TD
Appalachian State	Rushing	Terrence Upshaw	15 rushes, 86 yards
Appalachian State	Receiving	T. J. Watkins	3 receptions, 102 yards, TD

=== Florida State ===
Week Five: Florida State Seminoles at Wake Forest Demon Deacons – Game summary

Quarter	1	2	3	4	Total
Seminoles	3	10	3	10	26
Demon Deacons	3	9	0	7	19

at BB&T Field • Winston-Salem, North Carolina

- Date: September 30
- Game time: 3:30 p.m. EDT
- Game weather: 74 °F (23 °C) • NNE 10 mph (16 km/h) • Mostly sunny
- Game attendance: 31,588
- Referee: David Epperley
- TV announcers (ABC): Play-by-Play: Mike Patrick • Color Analyst: Tommy Tuberville • Sideline: Paul Carcaterra

Game information

First Quarter

- 7:06 FSU – Ricky Aguayo 51-yard field goal, Seminoles 3–0. Drive: 5 plays, 65 yards, TOP 2:35
- 2:48 WAKE – Mike Weaver 24-yard field goal, Tied 3–3. Drive: 5 plays, 20 yards, TOP 1:58

Second Quarter

- 13:17 WAKE – Mike Weaver 39-yard field goal, Demon Deacons 6–3. Drive: 4 plays, 7 yards, TOP 1:35
- 6:59 WAKE – John Wolford 3-yard run (Mike Weaver kick failed), Demon Deacons 12–3. Drive: 8 plays, 81 yards, TOP 2:16
- 5:41 FSU – Jacques Patrick 1-yard run (Ricky Aguayo kick), Demon Deacons 12–10. Drive: 4 plays, 16 yards, TOP 1:18
- 2:55 FSU – Ricky Aguayo 27-yard field goal, Seminoles 13–12. Drive: 5 plays, 20 yards, TOP 2:14

Third Quarter

- 4:18 FSU – Ricky Aguayo 37-yard field goal, Seminoles 16–12. Drive: 15 plays, 60 yards, TOP 8:22

Fourth Quarter

- 13:57 WAKE – Matt Colburn 7-yard run (Mike Weaver kick), Demon Deacons 19–16. Drive: 7 plays, 59 yards, TOP 2:19
- 6:20 FSU – Ricky Aguayo 35-yard field goal, Tied 19–19. Drive: 9 plays, 47 yards, TOP 3:58
- 0:53 FSU – Auden Tate 40-yard pass from James Blackman (Ricky Aguayo kick), Seminoles 26–19. Drive: 1 play, 40 yards, TOP 0:08

Statistics	FSU	WAKE
First downs	15	17
Total yards	270	367
Rushing yards	149	96
Passing yards	121	271
Turnovers	1	2
Time of possession	34:41	25:19

Team	Category	Player	Statistics
Florida State	Passing	James Blackman	11/21, 121 yards, TD
Florida State	Rushing	Jacques Patrick	19 rushes, 120 yards, TD
Florida State	Receiving	Auden Tate	2 receptions, 47 yards, TD
Wake Forest	Passing	John Wolford	24/34, 271 yards, INT
Wake Forest	Rushing	John Wolford	19 rushes, 63 yards, TD
Wake Forest	Receiving	Greg Dortch	10 receptions, 110 yards

=== At No. 2 Clemson ===
Week Six: Wake Forest Demon Deacons at Clemson Tigers – Game summary

Quarter	1	2	3	4	Total
Demon Deacons	0	0	0	14	14
No. 2 Tigers	14	0	7	7	28

at Memorial Stadium • Clemson, South Carolina

- Date: October 7
- Game time: 12:00 p.m. EDT
- Game weather: 80 °F (27 °C) • E 3 mph (4.8 km/h) • Mostly cloudy
- Game attendance: 80,567
- Referee: Stuart Mullins
- TV announcers (ESPN2): Play-by-Play: Beth Mowins • Color Analyst: Anthony Becht • Sideline: Rocky Boiman

Game information

First Quarter

- 12:59 CLEM – Deon Cain 28-yard pass from Kelly Bryant (Alex Spence kick), Tigers 7–0. Drive: 7 plays, 75 yards, TOP 2:01
- 6:18 CLEM – Adam Choice 4-yard run (Alex Spence kick), Tigers 14–0. Drive: 12 plays, 76 yards, TOP 5:07

Third Quarter

- 7:31 CLEM – Travis Etienne 1-yard run (Alex Spence kick), Tigers 21–0. Drive: 9 plays, 68 yards, TOP 3:38

Fourth Quarter

- 11:48 CLEM – Cannon Smith 13-yard pass from Hunter Johnson (Alex Spence kick), Tigers 28–0. Drive: 4 plays, 32 yards, TOP 1:20
- 8:32 WAKE – Scotty Washington 16-yard pass from Kendall Hinton (Mike Weaver kick), Tigers 28–7. Drive: 9 plays, 78 yards, TOP 3:16
- 2:28 WAKE – Cam Serigne 11-yard pass from Kendall Hinton (Mike Weaver kick), Tigers 28–14. Drive: 10 plays, 60 yards, TOP 4:05

Statistics	WAKE	CLEM
First downs	16	25
Total yards	336	453
Rushing yards	133	190
Passing yards	203	263
Turnovers	0	2
Time of possession	24:55	35:05

Team	Category	Player	Statistics
Wake Forest	Passing	Kendall Hinton	14/30, 203 yards, 2 TD
Wake Forest	Rushing	Kendall Hinton	24 rushes, 92 yards
Wake Forest	Receiving	Greg Dortch	5 receptions, 78 yards
Clemson	Passing	Kelly Bryant	21/29, 200 yards, TD, INT
Clemson	Rushing	Travis Etienne	15 rushes, 67 yards, TD
Clemson	Receiving	Hunter Renfrow	6 receptions, 61 yards

=== At Georgia Tech ===
Week Eight: Wake Forest Demon Deacons at Georgia Tech Yellow Jackets – Game summary

Quarter	1	2	3	4	Total
Demon Deacons	7	14	3	0	24
Yellow Jackets	3	10	12	13	38

at Bobby Dodd Stadium • Atlanta, Georgia

- Date: October 21
- Game time: 7:30 p.m. EDT
- Game weather: 68 °F (20 °C) • E 2 mph (3.2 km/h) • Cloudy
- Game attendance: 45,224
- Referee: Duane Heydt
- TV announcers (ESPNU): Play-by-Play: Anish Shroff • Color Analyst: Ahmad Brooks • Sideline: Roddy Jones

Game information

First Quarter

- 6:50 GT – Brenton King 22-yard field goal, Yellow Jackets 3–0. Drive: 15 plays, 70 yards, TOP 8:03
- 0:12 WAKE – Scotty Washington 6-yard pass from John Wolford (Mike Weaver kick), Demon Deacons 7–3. Drive: 6 plays, 54 yards, TOP 2:26

Second Quarter

- 9:28 GT – Jerry Howard 2-yard run (Brenton King kick), Yellow Jackets 10–7. Drive: 13 plays, 75 yards, TOP 5:44
- 5:57 WAKE – Tabari Hines 15-yard pass from John Wolford (Mike Weaver kick), Demon Deacons 14–10. Drive: 8 plays, 80 yards, TOP 3:25
- 1:02 WAKE – John Wolford 1-yard run (Mike Weaver kick), Demon Deacons 21–10. Drive: 9 plays, 64 yards, TOP 3:33
- 0:00 GT – Brenton King 42-yard field goal, Demon Deacons 21–13. Drive: 8 plays, 53 yards, TOP 1:02

Third Quarter

- 12:55 GT – TaQuon Marshall 49-yard run (two-point pass conv. failed), Demon Deacons 21–19. Drive: 1 play, 49 yards, TOP 0:11
- 7:31 WAKE – Mike Weaver 29-yard field goal, Demon Deacons 24–19. Drive: 6 plays, 48 yards, TOP 2:20
- 4:35 GT – Qua Searcy 42-yard run (two-point pass conv. failed), Yellow Jackets 25–24. Drive: 6 plays, 75 yards, TOP 2:56

Fourth Quarter

- 11:55 GT – KirVonte Benson 11-yard run (Brenton King kick blocked), Yellow Jackets 31–24. Drive: 12 plays, 57 yards, TOP 5:52
- 1:57 GT – TaQuon Marshall 70-yard run (Brenton King kick), Yellow Jackets 38–24. Drive: 3 plays, 76 yards, TOP 1:47

Statistics	WAKE	GT
First downs	20	29
Total yards	362	495
Rushing yards	110	427
Passing yards	252	68
Turnovers	1	0
Time of possession	24:02	35:58

Team	Category	Player	Statistics
Wake Forest	Passing	John Wolford	17/30, 252 yards, 2 TD, INT
Wake Forest	Rushing	Cade Carney	19 rushes, 92 yards
Wake Forest	Receiving	Greg Dortch	8 receptions, 125 yards
Georgia Tech	Passing	TaQuon Marshall	5/11, 68 yards
Georgia Tech	Rushing	TaQuon Marshall	23 rushes, 163 yards, 2 TD
Georgia Tech	Receiving	Ricky Jeune	3 receptions, 44 yards

=== Louisville ===
Week Nine: Louisville Cardinals at Wake Forest Demon Deacons – Game summary

Quarter	1	2	3	4	Total
Cardinals	3	7	7	15	32
Demon Deacons	14	14	7	7	42

at BB&T Field • Winston-Salem, North Carolina

- Date: October 28
- Game time: 12:20 p.m. EDT
- Game weather: 62 °F (17 °C) • S 6 mph (9.7 km/h) • Mostly cloudy
- Game attendance: 29,593
- Referee: Jerry Magallanes
- TV announcers (ACCN): Play-by-Play: Evan Lepler • Color Analyst: Takeo Spikes • Sideline: Amanda Kuhl

Game information

First Quarter

- 7:14 WAKE – John Wolford 1-yard run (Mike Weaver kick), Demon Deacons 7–0. Drive: 10 plays, 91 yards, TOP 3:08
- 2:23 LOU – Blanton Creque 35-yard field goal, Demon Deacons 7–3. Drive: 14 plays, 57 yards, TOP 4:51
- 1:05 WAKE – Greg Dortch 32-yard pass from John Wolford (Mike Weaver kick), Demon Deacons 14–3. Drive: 4 plays, 66 yards, TOP 1:18

Second Quarter

- 10:35 WAKE – Greg Dortch 4-yard pass from John Wolford (Mike Weaver kick), Demon Deacons 21–3. Drive: 10 plays, 80 yards, TOP 2:38
- 2:58 LOU – Lamar Jackson 7-yard run (Blanton Creque kick), Demon Deacons 21–10. Drive: 9 plays, 70 yards, TOP 3:38
- 1:29 WAKE – Greg Dortch 25-yard pass from John Wolford (Mike Weaver kick), Demon Deacons 28–10. Drive: 5 plays, 75 yards, TOP 1:29

Third Quarter

- 10:21 WAKE – Greg Dortch 52-yard pass from John Wolford (Mike Weaver kick), Demon Deacons 35–10. Drive: 4 plays, 70 yards, TOP 1:04
- 5:53 LOU – Lamar Jackson 4-yard run (Blanton Creque kick), Demon Deacons 35–17. Drive: 12 plays, 75 yards, TOP 4:28

Fourth Quarter

- 1:10 LOU – Lamar Jackson 55-yard run (Lamar Jackson pass to Jaylen Smith for two-point conv.), Demon Deacons 35–25. Drive: 4 plays, 62 yards, TOP 0:49
- 0:57 WAKE – Chuck Wade 44-yard pass from John Wolford (Mike Weaver kick), Demon Deacons 42–25. Drive: 2 plays, 46 yards, TOP 0:13
- 0:14 LOU – Charles Standberry 20-yard pass from Lamar Jackson (Blanton Creque kick), Demon Deacons 42–32. Drive: 4 plays, 64 yards, TOP 0:43

Statistics	LOU	WAKE
First downs	30	26
Total yards	523	625
Rushing yards	191	164
Passing yards	332	461
Turnovers	1	1
Time of possession	33:59	26:01

Team	Category	Player	Statistics
Louisville	Passing	Lamar Jackson	27/44, 330 yards, TD, INT
Louisville	Rushing	Lamar Jackson	27 rushes, 161 yards, 3 TD
Louisville	Receiving	Jaylen Smith	6 receptions, 73 yards
Wake Forest	Passing	John Wolford	28/34, 461 yards, 5 TD
Wake Forest	Rushing	Matt Colburn	24 rushes, 134 yards
Wake Forest	Receiving	Greg Dortch	10 receptions, 167 yards, 4 TD

=== At No. 5 Notre Dame ===
Week Ten: Wake Forest Demon Deacons at Notre Dame Fighting Irish – Game summary

Quarter	1	2	3	4	Total
Demon Deacons	3	7	13	14	37
No. 5 Fighting Irish	7	24	10	7	48

at Notre Dame Stadium • Notre Dame, Indiana

- Date: November 4
- Game time: 3:30 p.m. EST
- Game weather: 43 °F (6 °C) • ESE 10 mph (16 km/h) • Light rain, chilly
- Game attendance: 77,622
- Referee: Jeff Flanagan
- TV announcers (NBC): Play-by-Play: Mike Tirico • Color Analyst: Doug Flutie • Sideline: Kathryn Tappen

Game information

First Quarter

- 8:46 WAKE – Mike Weaver 34-yard field goal, Demon Deacons 3–0. Drive: 14 plays, 82 yards, TOP 4:11
- 6:26 ND – Brandon Wimbush 6-yard run (Justin Yoon kick), Fighting Irish 7–3. Drive: 7 plays, 48 yards, TOP 2:20

Second Quarter

- 14:18 ND – Justin Yoon 34-yard field goal, Fighting Irish 10–3. Drive: 9 plays, 70 yards, TOP 3:38
- 14:00 ND – Tony Jones Jr. 5-yard run (Justin Yoon kick), Fighting Irish 17–3. Drive: 1 play, 5 yards, TOP 0:05
- 10:13 WAKE – John Wolford 20-yard run (Mike Weaver kick), Fighting Irish 17–10. Drive: 3 plays, 69 yards, TOP 0:40
- 8:38 ND – Brandon Wimbush 50-yard run (Justin Yoon kick), Fighting Irish 24–10. Drive: 5 plays, 65 yards, TOP 1:35
- 0:22 ND – Nic Weishar 1 -yard pass from Ian Book (Justin Yoon kick), Fighting Irish 31–10. Drive: 9 plays, 99 yards, TOP 2:47

Third Quarter

- 9:19 ND – Justin Yoon 22-yard field goal, Fighting Irish 34–10. Drive: 12 plays, 52 yards, TOP 4:00
- 2:54 WAKE – Alex Bachman 30-yard pass from John Wolford (two-point pass conv. failed), Fighting Irish 34–16. Drive: 6 plays, 63 yards, TOP 1:32
- 2:04 ND – Chase Claypool 34-yard pass from Brandon Wimbush (Justin Yoon kick), Fighting Irish 41–16. Drive: 4 plays, 78 yards, TOP 0:50
- 0:30 WAKE – Matt Colburn 24-yard run (Mike Weaver kick), Fighting Irish 41–23. Drive: 6 plays, 75 yards, TOP 1:34

Fourth Quarter

- 11:39 ND – Deon McIntosh 2-yard run (Justin Yoon kick), Fighting Irish 48–23. Drive: 9 plays, 85 yards, TOP 3:51
- 8:45 WAKE – Jack Freudenthal 11-yard pass from John Wolford (Mike Weaver kick), Fighting Irish 48–30. Drive: 12 plays, 70 yards, TOP 2:54
- 0:51 WAKE – Isaiah Robinson 2-yard run (Mike Weaver kick), Fighting Irish 48–37. Drive: 14 plays, 90 yards, TOP 4:36

Statistics	WAKE	ND
First downs	34	30
Total yards	587	710
Rushing yards	239	380
Passing yards	348	330
Turnovers	1	0
Time of possession	28:07	31:53

Team	Category	Player	Statistics
Wake Forest	Passing	John Wolford	28/45, 331 yards, 2 TD, INT
Wake Forest	Rushing	Matt Colburn	20 rushes, 120 yards, TD
Wake Forest	Receiving	Alex Bachman	8 receptions, 116 yards, TD
Notre Dame	Passing	Brandon Wimbush	15/30, 280 yards, TD
Notre Dame	Rushing	Brandon Wimbush	12 rushes, 110 yards, 2 TD
Notre Dame	Receiving	Chase Claypool	9 receptions, 180 yards, TD

=== At Syracuse ===
Week Eleven: Wake Forest Demon Deacons at Syracuse Orange – Game summary

Quarter	1	2	3	4	Total
Demon Deacons	21	3	16	24	64
Orange	14	24	5	0	43

at Carrier Dome • Syracuse, New York

- Date: November 11
- Game time: 3:00 p.m. EST
- Game weather: None (played indoors)
- Game attendance: 38,539
- Referee: Duane Heydt
- TV announcers (ACCRSN): Play-by-Play: Wes Durham • Color Analyst: James Bates • Sideline: Rebecca Kaple

Game information

First Quarter

- 10:30 WAKE – John Wolford 3-yard run (Mike Weaver kick), Demon Deacons 7–0. Drive: 8 plays, 73 yards, TOP 2:35
- 8:33 SYR – Dontae Strickland 43-yard run (Cole Murphy kick), Tied 7–7. Drive: 6 plays, 75 yards, TOP 1:57
- 5:26 WAKE – Matt Colburn 3-yard run (Mike Weaver kick), Demon Deacons 14–7. Drive: 10 plays, 80 yards, TOP 3:07
- 3:52 SYR – Ravian Pierce 19-yard pass from Zack Mahoney (Cole Murphy kick), Tied 14–14. Drive: 5 plays, 75 yards, TOP 1:34
- 2:27 WAKE – Cam Serigne 31-yard pass from John Wolford (Mike Weaver kick), Demon Deacons 21–14. Drive: 5 plays, 75 yards, TOP 1:25

Second Quarter

- 12:08 SYR – Chris Elmore 1-yard run (Cole Murphy kick), Tied 21–21. Drive: 10 plays, 56 yards, TOP 3:00
- 9:05 SYR – Steve Ishmael 30-yard pass from Zack Mahoney (Cole Murphy kick), Orange 28–21. Drive: 7 plays, 77 yards, TOP 1:58
- 3:03 SYR – Cole Murphy 30-yard field goal, Orange 31–21. Drive: 11 plays, 61 yards, TOP 4:10
- 0:16 SYR – Ravian Pierce 18-yard pass from Zack Mahoney (Cole Murphy kick), Orange 38–21. Drive: 3 plays, 26 yards, TOP 0:17
- 0:00 WAKE – Mike Weaver 41-yard field goal, Orange 38–24. Drive: 3 plays, 52 yards, TOP 0:16

Third Quarter

- 12:29 WAKE – Mike Weaver 43-yard field goal, Orange 38–27. Drive: 7 plays, 45 yards, TOP 2:31
- 9:09 SYR – Cole Murphy 47-yard field goal, Orange 41–27. Drive: 11 plays, 46 yards, TOP 3:20
- 6:20 WAKE – John Wolford 9-yard run (Mike Weaver kick), Orange 41–34. Drive: 9 plays, 76 yards, TOP 2:49
- 1:08 WAKE – Cam Serigne 19-yard pass from John Wolford (Mike Weaver kick blocked), Orange 41–40. Drive: 7 plays, 63 yards, TOP 2:52
- 1:08 SYR – Scoop Bradshaw defensive extra point conv., Orange 43–40. Drive: 7 plays, 63 yards, TOP 2:52

Fourth Quarter

- 11:48 WAKE – John Wolford 29-yard run (Mike Weaver kick), Demon Deacons 47–43. Drive: 7 plays, 67 yards, TOP 2:23
- 7:17 WAKE – Cam Serigne 6-yard pass from John Wolford (Mike Weaver kick), Demon Deacons 54–43. Drive: 5 plays, 20 yards, TOP 1:34
- 4:58 WAKE – Mike Weaver 30-yard field goal, Demon Deacons 57–43. Drive: 6 plays, 18 yards, TOP 1:42
- 2:00 WAKE – Matt Colburn 76-yard run (Mike Weaver kick), Demon Deacons 64–43. Drive: 5 plays, 85 yards, TOP 1:54

Statistics	WAKE	SYR
First downs	33	33
Total yards	734	621
Rushing yards	371	178
Passing yards	363	443
Turnovers	1	2
Time of possession	30:16	29:44

Team	Category	Player	Statistics
Wake Forest	Passing	John Wolford	25/38, 363 yards, 3 TD
Wake Forest	Rushing	Matt Colburn	31 rushes, 237 yards, 2 TD
Wake Forest	Receiving	Tabari Hines	9 receptions, 124 yards
Syracuse	Passing	Zack Mahoney	33/60, 384 yards, 3 TD, 2 INT
Syracuse	Rushing	Moe Neal	12 rushes, 86 yards
Syracuse	Receiving	Steve Ishmael	14 receptions, 145 yards, TD

=== No. 25 NC State ===
Week Twelve: NC State Wolfpack at Wake Forest Demon Deacons – Game summary

Quarter	1	2	3	4	Total
No. 25 Wolfpack	7	7	7	3	24
Demon Deacons	14	7	3	6	30

at BB&T Field • Winston-Salem, North Carolina

- Date: November 18
- Game time: 7:30 p.m. EST
- Game weather: 61 °F (16 °C) • SSW 15 mph (24 km/h) • Overcast, rain poss.
- Game attendance: 31,803
- Referee: Jeff Heaser
- TV announcers (ESPNU): Play-by-Play: Clay Matvick • Color Analyst: Kirk Morrison

Game information

First Quarter

- 9:59 WAKE – Matt Colburn 11-yard run (Mike Weaver kick), Demon Deacons 7–0. Drive: 5 plays, 64 yards, TOP 1:32
- 5:13 NCST – Jaylen Samuels 11-yard run (Kyle Bambard kick), Tied 7–7. Drive: 10 plays, 75 yards, TOP 4:46
- 2:35 WAKE – Tabari Hines 21-yard pass from John Wolford (Mike Weaver kick), Demon Deacons 14–7. Drive: 9 plays, 67 yards, TOP 2:32

Second Quarter

- 6:12 NCST – Reggie Gallaspy II 1-yard run (Kyle Bambard kick), Tied 14–14. Drive: 12 plays, 84 yards, TOP 6:29
- 2:47 WAKE – Tabari Hines 7-yard pass from John Wolford (Mike Weaver kick), Demon Deacons 21–14. Drive: 9 plays, 75 yards, TOP 3:25

Third Quarter

- 10:32 NCST – Emeka Emezie 20-yard pass from Ryan Finley (Kyle Bambard kick), Tied 21–21. Drive: 8 plays, 78 yards, TOP 3:14
- 4:14 WAKE – Mike Weaver 36-yard field goal, Demon Deacons 24–21. Drive: 5 plays, 41 yards, TOP 1:18

Fourth Quarter

- 10:45 NCST – Kyle Bambard 25-yard field goal, Tied 24–24. Drive: 19 plays, 76 yards, TOP 8:08
- 8:03 WAKE – Tabari Hines 18-yard pass from John Wolford (Mike Weaver kick blocked), Demon Deacons 30–24. Drive: 8 plays, 73 yards, TOP 2:35

Statistics	NCST	WAKE
First downs	28	18
Total yards	502	334
Rushing yards	175	87
Passing yards	327	247
Turnovers	3	1
Time of possession	41:07	18:53

Team	Category	Player	Statistics
NC State	Passing	Ryan Finley	34/52, 327 yards, TD, INT
NC State	Rushing	Jaylen Samuels	7 rushes, 50 yards, TD
NC State	Receiving	Kelvin Harmon	8 receptions, 105 yards
Wake Forest	Passing	John Wolford	19/28, 247 yards, 3 TD, INT
Wake Forest	Rushing	Matt Colburn	12 rushes, 38 yards, TD
Wake Forest	Receiving	Tabari Hines	8 receptions, 139 yards, 3 TD

=== Duke ===
Week Thirteen: Duke Blue Devils at Wake Forest Demon Deacons – Game summary

Quarter	1	2	3	4	Total
Blue Devils	3	7	7	14	31
Demon Deacons	10	7	6	0	23

at BB&T Field • Winston-Salem, North Carolina

- Date: November 25
- Game time: 12:30 p.m. EST
- Game weather: 58 °F (14 °C) • SW 8 mph (13 km/h) • Partly cloudy
- Game attendance: 27,016
- Referee: Riley Johnson
- TV announcers (ACCRSN): Play-by-Play: Wes Durham • Color Analyst: James Bates • Sideline: Rebecca Kaple

Game information

First Quarter

- 12:04 WAKE – Tabari Hines 3-yard pass from John Wolford (Mike Weaver kick), Demon Deacons 7–0. Drive: 4 plays, 28 yards, TOP 1:17
- 5:38 WAKE – Mike Weaver 29-yard field goal, Demon Deacons 10–0. Drive: 6 plays, 19 yards, TOP 1:40
- 0:56 DUKE – Austin Parker 38-yard field goal, Demon Deacons 10–3. Drive: 10 plays, 45 yards, TOP 4:42

Second Quarter

- 6:44 WAKE – Alex Bachman 43-yard pass from John Wolford (Mike Weaver kick), Demon Deacons 17–3. Drive: 1 play, 43 yards, TOP 0:12
- 2:56 DUKE – Daniel Helm 18-yard pass from Daniel Jones (Austin Parker kick), Demon Deacons 17–10. Drive: 6 plays, 82 yards, TOP 1:57

Third Quarter

- 9:19 WAKE – Mike Weaver 41-yard field goal, Demon Deacons 20–10. Drive: 7 plays, 46 yards, TOP 2:01
- 6:58 DUKE – Noah Gray 6-yard pass from Daniel Jones (Austin Parker kick), Demon Deacons 20–17. Drive: 6 plays, 75 yards, TOP 2:21
- 3:31 WAKE – Mike Weaver 43-yard field goal, Demon Deacons 23–17. Drive: 12 plays, 50 yards, TOP 3:27

Fourth Quarter

- 13:53 DUKE – Daniel Jones 1-yard run (Austin Parker kick), Blue Devils 24–23. Drive: 11 plays, 75 yards, TOP 4:38
- 8:23 DUKE – Brittain Brown 4-yard run (Austin Parker kick), Blue Devils 31–23. Drive: 12 plays, 74 yards, TOP 3:59

Statistics	DUKE	WAKE
First downs	22	14
Total yards	443	336
Rushing yards	97	145
Passing yards	346	191
Turnovers	3	3
Time of possession	37:10	22:50

Team	Category	Player	Statistics
Duke	Passing	Daniel Jones	25/44, 346 yards, 2 TD, 3 INT
Duke	Rushing	Shaun Wilson	17 rushes, 38 yards
Duke	Receiving	T. J. Rahming	8 receptions, 90 yards
Wake Forest	Passing	John Wolford	16/33, 191 yards, 2 TD, 2 INT
Wake Forest	Rushing	John Wolford	12 rushes, 48 yards
Wake Forest	Receiving	Alex Bachman	3 receptions, 90 yards, TD

=== Vs. Texas A&M (Belk Bowl) ===
Belk Bowl: Texas A&M Aggies vs. Wake Forest Demon Deacons – Game summary

Quarter	1	2	3	4	Total
Demon Deacons	17	21	3	14	55
Aggies	14	14	14	10	52

at Bank of America Stadium • Charlotte, North Carolina

- Date: December 29
- Game time: 1:00 p.m. EST
- Game weather: 41 °F (5 °C) • W 3–7 mph (4.8–11.3 km/h) • Clear, cool
- Game attendance: 32,784
- Referee: Steve Strimling
- TV announcers (ESPN): Play-by-Play: Jason Benetti • Color Analyst: Kelly Stouffer • Sideline: Kris Budden

Game information

First Quarter

- 12:48 TAMU – Charles Oliver 0-yard return of blocked punt (Daniel LaCamera kick), Aggies 7–0. Drive: 3 plays, 4 yards, TOP 0:55
- 11:04 TAMU – Trayveon Williams 2-yard run (Daniel LaCamera kick), Aggies 14–0. Drive: 3 plays, 55 yards, TOP 0:31
- 8:47 WAKE – Scotty Washington 50-yard pass from John Wolford (Mike Weaver kick), Aggies 14–7. Drive: 6 plays, 69 yards, TOP 2:17
- 5:47 WAKE – Tabari Hines 7-yard pass from John Wolford (Mike Weaver kick), Tied 14–14. Drive: 5 plays, 50 yards, TOP 1:07
- 1:33 WAKE – Mike Weaver 28-yard field goal, Demon Deacons 17–14. Drive: 5 plays, 70 yards, TOP 0:56

Second Quarter

- 13:25 WAKE – Tabari Hines 7-yard pass from John Wolford (Mike Weaver kick), Demon Deacons 24–14. Drive: 9 plays, 83 yards, TOP 2:13
- 12:21 WAKE – Jessie Bates III 59-yard punt return (Mike Weaver kick), Demon Deacons 31–14. Drive: 3 plays, 2 yards, TOP 1:04
- 7:31 TAMU – Christian Kirk 52-yard pass from Nick Starkel (Daniel LaCamera kick), Demon Deacons 31–21. Drive: 3 plays, 75 yards, TOP 0:50
- 4:33 WAKE – Cam Serigne 37-yard pass from John Wolford (Mike Weaver kick), Demon Deacons 38–21. Drive: 3 plays, 47 yards, TOP 0:53
- 0:18 TAMU – Christian Kirk 10-yard pass from Nick Starkel (Daniel LaCamera kick), Demon Deacons 38–28. Drive: 9 plays, 80 yards, TOP 1:59

Third Quarter

- 12:51 TAMU – Christian Kirk 9-yard pass from Nick Starkel (Daniel LaCamera kick), Demon Deacons 38–35. Drive: 4 plays, 64 yards, TOP 0:58
- 5:55 WAKE – Mike Weaver 27-yard field goal, Demon Deacons 41–35. Drive: 10 plays, 75 yards, TOP 2:19
- 1:59 TAMU – Keith Ford 1-yard run (Daniel LaCamera kick), Aggies 42–41. Drive: 7 plays, 67 yards, TOP 1:57

Fourth Quarter

- 12:39 TAMU – Daniel LaCamera 19-yard field goal, Aggies 45–41. Drive: 7 plays, 35 yards, TOP 2:50
- 9:06 WAKE – Cade Carney 1-yard run (Mike Weaver kick), Demon Deacons 48–45. Drive: 11 plays, 69 yards, TOP 3:33
- 5:52 TAMU – Jhamon Ausbon 13-yard pass from Nick Starkel (Daniel LaCamera kick), Aggies 52–48. Drive: 10 plays, 72 yards, TOP 3:14
- 2:18 WAKE – Matt Colburn 1-yard run (Mike Weaver kick), Demon Deacons 55–52. Drive: 13 plays, 69 yards, TOP 3:34

Statistics	WAKE	TAMU
First downs	31	32
Total yards	646	614
Rushing yards	246	115
Passing yards	400	499
Turnovers	2	3
Time of possession	30:10	29:50

Team	Category	Player	Statistics
Wake Forest	Passing	John Wolford	32/49, 400 yards, 4 TD
Wake Forest	Rushing	Matt Colburn	21 rushes, 150 yards, TD
Wake Forest	Receiving	Scotty Washington	9 receptions, 138 yards, TD
Texas A&M	Passing	Nick Starkel	42/63, 499 yards, 4 TD, INT
Texas A&M	Rushing	Trayveon Williams	7 rushes, 65 yards, TD
Texas A&M	Receiving	Christian Kirk	13 receptions, 189 yards, 3 TD

== 2018 NFL draft ==
Player	Team	Round	Pick #	Position
Jessie Bates	Cincinnati Bengals	2nd	54	S
Duke Ejiofor	Houston Texans	6th	177	DE
