= 2017 Texas A&M Aggies football team =

American college football season

2017 Texas A&M Aggies football

Belk Bowl, L 52–55 vs. Wake Forest
- Conference: Southeastern Conference
- Western Division
- Record: 7–6 (4–4 SEC)
- Head coach: Kevin Sumlin (6th season; regular season); Jeff Banks (interim; bowl game)
- Offensive coordinator: Noel Mazzone (2nd season)
- Offensive scheme: Spread
- Defensive coordinator: John Chavis (3rd season)
- Base defense: Multiple 4–3
- Home stadium: Kyle Field

2017 Southeastern Conference football standings
	Conf.			Overall
Team	W		L	W		L
Eastern Division
No. 2 Georgia x$^	7	–	1	13	–	2
South Carolina	5	–	3	9	–	4
Kentucky	4	–	4	7	–	6
Missouri	4	–	4	7	–	6
Florida	3	–	5	4	–	7
Vanderbilt	1	–	7	5	–	7
Tennessee	0	–	8	4	–	8
Western Division
No. 10 Auburn xy	7	–	1	10	–	4
No. 1 Alabama x#^	7	–	1	13	–	1
No. 18 LSU	6	–	2	9	–	4
No. 19 Mississippi State	4	–	4	9	–	4
Texas A&M	4	–	4	7	–	6
Ole Miss*	3	–	5	6	–	6
Arkansas	1	–	7	4	–	8
Championship: Georgia 28, Auburn 7
# – College Football Playoff champion; ^ – College Football Playoff participant; $ – Conference champion; x – Division champion/co-champions; y – Championship game participant; * Ole Miss ineligible for postseason due to NCAA sanctions; Rankings from AP Poll

The 2017 Texas A&M Aggies football team represented Texas A&M University in the 2017 NCAA Division I FBS football season. The Aggies played their home games at Kyle Field in College Station, Texas and competed in the Western Division of the Southeastern Conference (SEC). They were led by sixth-year head coach Kevin Sumlin. They finished the season 7–6, 4–4 in SEC play to finish in a tie for fourth place in the Western Division. They were invited to the Belk Bowl where they lost to Wake Forest. This season was the first time since 2009 that Texas A&M was not ranked in the AP Poll during the regular season.

On November 26, head coach Kevin Sumlin was fired. He finished at Texas A&M with a six-year record of 51–26. Interim head coach Jeff Banks led the Aggies in the Belk Bowl.

On December 2, Florida State head coach Jimbo Fisher was hired by Texas A&M as their new head coach.

== Schedule ==
Texas A&M announced its 2017 football schedule on September 13, 2016. The 2017 schedule consists of 7 home games, 4 away games and 1 neutral site game in the regular season. The Aggies will host SEC foes Alabama, Auburn, Mississippi State, and South Carolina, and will travel to Florida, LSU, and Ole Miss. Texas A&M will go against Arkansas for the fourth time in a row in Arlington, Texas.

The Aggies will host three of its four non–conference games which are against Louisiana from the Sun Belt Conference, New Mexico from the Mountain West Conference and Nicholls State from the Southland Conference and travel to UCLA from the Pac-12 Conference.

Date	Time	Opponent	Site	TV	Result	Attendance
September 3	6:30 p.m.	at UCLA*	Rose Bowl; Pasadena, CA	FOX	L 44–45	64,635
September 9	6:00 p.m.	Nicholls State*	Kyle Field; College Station, TX	ESPNU	W 24–14	100,276
September 16	11:00 a.m.	Louisiana*	Kyle Field; College Station, TX	SECN	W 45–21	98,412
September 23	11:00 a.m.	vs. Arkansas	AT&T Stadium; Arlington, TX (Southwest Classic)	ESPN	W 50–43 ^{OT}	64,668
September 30	6:30 p.m.	South Carolina	Kyle Field; College Station, TX	SECN	W 24–17	96,430
October 7	6:15 p.m.	No. 1 Alabama	Kyle Field; College Station, TX	ESPN	L 19–27	101,058
October 14	6:00 p.m.	at Florida	Ben Hill Griffin Stadium; Gainesville, FL	ESPN2	W 19–17	86,114
October 28	6:15 p.m.	Mississippi State	Kyle Field; College Station, TX	ESPN	L 14–35	96,128
November 4	11:00 a.m.	No. 16 Auburn	Kyle Field; College Station, TX	ESPN	L 27–42	100,257
November 11	6:00 p.m.	New Mexico*	Kyle Field; College Station, TX	ESPNU	W 55–14	99,051
November 18	6:00 p.m.	at Ole Miss	Vaught–Hemingway Stadium; Oxford, MS	ESPN2	W 31–24	55,880
November 25	6:30 p.m.	at No. 19 LSU	Tiger Stadium; Baton Rouge, LA (rivalry)	SECN	L 21–45	97,675
December 29	12:00 p.m.	vs. Wake Forest*	Bank of America Stadium; Charlotte, NC (Belk Bowl)	ESPN	L 52–55	32,784
*Non-conference game; Rankings from AP Poll released prior to game; All times are in Central time

Schedule source:

== Roster ==
2017 Texas A&M Aggies football team roster
Players
Coaches
Offense

Pos.	#	Name	Class
WR	1	Quartney Davis	Fr
WR	2	Jhamon Ausbon	Fr
WR	3	Christian Kirk	Jr
WR	4	Damion Ratley	Sr
RB	5	Trayveon Williams	So
WR	6	Roshaaud Paul	Fr
RB	7	Keith Ford	Sr
QB	8	Connor Blumrick	Fr
WR	9	Hezekiah Jones	Fr
QB	10	Jake Hubenak	Sr
QB	11	Kellen Mond	Fr
WR	13	Kendrick Rogers	Fr
WR	14	Camron Buckley	Fr
WR	15	Aaron Hansford	Fr
WR	16	Klyde Chriss	Fr
QB	17	Nick Starkel	Fr
QB	18	Bo Schneider	So
QB	19	Colton Taylor	Fr
QB	20	Tyler Bruggman	Sr
RB	22	Kwame Etwi	Jr
RB	23	Jacob Kibodi	Fr
RB	25	Kendall Bussey	So
RB	27	John Clark	Fr
RB	28	AJ Sanders	Fr
WR	30	Andrew Boykin	Fr
TE	31	Gannon Rawlins	So
WR	33	Justice Bean	Fr
WR	40	Will Gunnell	Fr
WR	42	Ke'undre Azakytu	Fr
TE	43	Grant Gustafson	So
TE	47	Jacob Groff	Fr
OL	51	Riley Anderson	So
OL	54	Carson Green	Fr
OL	63	Cagan Baldree	Fr
OL	64	Erik McCoy	So
OL	65	Dan Moore	Fr
OL	66	Robert Congel	Fr
OL	68	Justin Dworaczyk	So
OL	69	Brayden Talbert	So
OL	70	Connor Lanfear	Jr
OL	71	Grayson Reed	Fr
OL	73	Jared Hocker	Fr
OL	74	Kellen Diesch	Fr
OL	75	Koda Martin	Jr
OL	76	Colton Prater	So
OL	77	Ryan McCollum	Fr
OL	78	Keaton Sutherland	Jr
OL	79	Christian Daimler	Sr
WR	82	Matthew Kirchner	Sr
WR	83	Kyle Whitley	Jr
WR	84	Moses Reynolds	Fr
TE	85	Camron Horry	Fr
TE	86	Tanner Schorp	Sr
TE	87	Greer Shetler	So
TE	88	Keynel Mczeal	Fr
TE	89	Kalvin Cline	Sr

Defense

Pos.	#	Name	Class
DB	1	Nick Harvey	Jr
DL	2	Micheal Clemons	So
DL	3	Tyree Johnson	Fr
DB	4	Derrick Tucker	Fr
DL	5	Daylon Mack	Jr
DB	6	Donovan Wilson	Sr
LB	7	Buddy Johnson	Fr
DB	8	Justin Dunning	So
DL	9	Qualen Cunningham	Sr
DB	10	Myles Jones	Fr
DB	11	Larry Pryor	So
LB	12	Cullen Gillaspia	Jr
DB	13	Cade Prendergast	Fr
DB	14	Keldrick Carper	Fr
DB	16	Kemah Siverand	So
DB	17	Devin Morris	Fr
DB	18	Antonio Howard	So
LB	19	Anthony Hines III	Fr
DB	20	Ikenna Okeke	Fr
DB	21	Charles Oliver	So
DB	22	Clifford Chattman	So
DB	23	Armani Watts	Sr
DB	24	Priest Willis	Sr
LB	25	Tyrel Dodson	Fr
DB	26	DeShawn Capers-Smith	Jr
DB	27	Roney Elam	So
DB	28	Travon Fuller	Fr
DB	29	Debione Renfro	Fr
LB	32	Santino Marchiol	Fr
DL	33	Ondario Robinson	Fr
LB	35	Riley Garner	Jr
DL	37	Mitchell Howard	So
DL	40	Jarrett Johnson	Sr
LB	41	Mark Wagner	Fr
LB	42	Otaro Alaka	Jr
DL	46	Landis Durham	Jr
LB	50	Mac Labhart	Jr
LB	56	Keeath Magee II	Fr
LB	58	Braden White	Fr
DL	88	Kingsley Keke	Jr
DL	90	TD Moton	Fr
DL	92	Zaycoven Henderson	Sr
DL	93	Jayden Peevy	Fr
DL	94	Landry Estes	Jr
DL	95	Justin Madubuike	Fr
DL	96	David Darley	Sr
DL	99	Josh Rogers	Fr

Special teams

Pos.	#	Name	Class
P	18	Shane Tripucka	Sr
PK	34	Braden Mann	So
PK/P	36	Daniel LaCamera	Jr
PK	38	Drew Riethman	Fr
DS	39	Jake Pagel	Fr
DS	45	Austin Frey	Jr

Head coach

- Kevin Sumlin (6th season)

Coordinators/assistant coaches

- Jeff Banks – Special Teams Coordinator/Tight Ends
- John Chavis – Associate Head Coach/Defensive Coordinator/Linebackers
- Matt Fontenot – Director of Football Operations
- Mikado Hinson – Director of Player Development
- Larry Jackson – Director of Football Sports Performance
- Scott Johnston – Director of On-Campus Recruiting
- Terry Joseph – Secondary
- Noel Mazzone – Offensive Coordinator
- Clarence McKinney – Running Backs
- Aaron Moorehead – Wide Receivers
- Dennis Polian – Director of Player Personnel
- Terry Price – Defensive Ends
- Gary Reynolds – Associate Athletic Director - Football
- David Turner – Defensive Tackles/Defensive Run-Game Coordinator
- Jim Turner – Offensive Line
- Jeremy Springer – Special teams quality control

Legend

- (C) Team captain
- (S) Suspended
- (I) Ineligible
- Injured
- Redshirt

Roster
Last update: August 26, 2016

== Coaching staff ==
Name	Position	Season at Texas A&M
Kevin Sumlin	Head coach	6th
John Chavis	Associate head coach, defensive coordinator, and linebackers coach	3rd
Ron Cooper	Defensive backs coach	1st
Terry Price	Defensive ends coach	6th
David Turner	Defensive run game coordinator and defensive tackles coach	2nd
Noel Mazone	Offensive coordinator and quarterbacks coach	2nd
Clarence McKinney	Running backs coach	6th
Aaron Morehead	Wide receivers coach	3rd
Jim Turner	Offensive line coach	6th
Jeff Banks	Special teams coordinator and tight ends coach	5th
	Strength and conditioning coach	1st
Jeremy Springer	Special teams quality control coach	3rd

== Game summaries ==
=== UCLA ===
Week One: Texas A&M Aggies at UCLA Bruins – Game summary

Quarter	1	2	3	4	Total
Aggies	17	21	6	0	44
Bruins	3	7	7	28	45

at Rose Bowl, Pasadena, CA

- Date: September 3
- Game time: 6:30 p.m. CDT
- Game weather: Temperature: 88 °F (31 °C) • Weather: partly cloudy • Wind: SSW 8 MPH
- Game attendance: 64,635
- Referee: John McDaid
- TV announcers (FOX): Gus Johnson (play-by-play), Joel Klatt (color), Jenny Taft (reporter)

Game information

First quarter

- UCLA – J.J. Molson 29-yard field goal, 11:09. Bruins 3–0. Drive: 12 plays, 53 yards, 3:51.
- TAMU – Keith Ford 5-yard run (Daniel LaCamera kick), 6:41. Aggies 7–3. Drive: 11 plays, 75 yards, 4:28.
- TAMU – Daniel LaCamera 19-yard field goal, 5:11. Aggies 10–3. Drive: 4 plays, 2 yards, 0:38.
- TAMU – Trayveon Williams 2-yard run (Daniel LaCamera kick), 4:04. Aggies 17–3. Drive: 3 plays, 20 yards, 0:56.

Second quarter

- TAMU – Keith Ford 2-yard run (Daniel LaCamera kick), 11:38. Aggies 24–3. Drive: 7 plays, 99 yards, 3:07.
- TAMU – Keith Ford 1-yard run (Daniel LaCamera kick), 4:11. Aggies 31–3. Drive: 11 plays, 56 yards, 4:07.
- UCLA – Jalen Starks 2-yard run (J.J. Molson kick), 3:00. Aggies 31–10. Drive: 4 plays, 67 yards, 1:11.
- TAMU – Trayveon Williams 61-yard run (Daniel LaCamera kick), 2:40. Aggies 38–10. Drive: 1 play, 61 yards, 0:20.

Third quarter

- TAMU – Daniel LaCamera 32-yard field goal, 9:57. Aggies 41–10. Drive: 6 plays, 23 yards, 2:31.
- TAMU – Daniel LaCamera 48-yard field goal, 4:08. Aggies 44–10. Drive: 12 plays, 41 yards, 4:24.
- UCLA – Soso Jamabo 6-yard run (J.J. Molson kick), 2:06. Aggies 44–17. Drive: 8 plays, 75 yards, 2:02.

Fourth quarter

- UCLA – Darren Andrews 9-yard pass from Josh Rosen (J.J. Molson kick), 13:22. Aggies 44–24. Drive: 8 plays, 85 yards, 2:04.
- UCLA – Darren Andrews 42-yard pass from Josh Rosen (J.J. Molson kick), 8:12. Aggies 44–31. Drive: 5 plays, 96 yards, 1:06.
- UCLA – Theo Howard 16-yard pass from Josh Rosen (J.J. Molson kick), 3:10. Aggies 44–38. Drive: 6 plays, 74 yards, 1:31.
- UCLA – Jordan Lasley 10-yard pass from Josh Rosen (J.J. Molson kick), 0:43. Bruins 45–44. Drive: 10 plays, 66 yards, 1:56.

Leading Passers

- TAMU – Nick Starkel – 6/13, 62 yards
- UCLA – Josh Rosen – 35/59, 491 yards, 4 TD

Leading Rushers

- TAMU – Trayveon Williams – 22 carries, 203 yards, 2 TD
- UCLA – Soso Jamabo – 7 carries, 46 yards, TD

Leading Receivers

- TAMU – Christian Kirk – 5 receptions, 60 yards
- UCLA – Caleb Wilson – 15 receptions, 208 yards

The Texas A&M Aggies opened up the 2017 season on the road against the UCLA Bruins at the Rose Bowl. Despite leading the Bruins 44–10 with 4:08 left in the 3rd, the Aggies were stifled in the 4th quarter, losing 45–44. The 34 point comeback victory is the largest in UCLA history. Nick Starkel started at quarterback for Texas A&M before leaving the game with an apparent left foot injury, with Kellen Mond taking his place.

=== Nicholls State ===
Week Two: Nicholls State Colonels at Texas A&M Aggies – Game summary

Quarter	1	2	3	4	Total
Colonels	0	6	0	8	14
Aggies	14	0	0	10	24

at Kyle Field, College Station, TX

- Date: September 9
- Game time: 6:00 p.m. CDT
- Game weather: Temperature: 84 °F (29 °C) • weather: sunny • wind: NNE 10 MPH
- Game attendance: 100,276
- Referee: Kevin Boitmann
- TV announcers (ESPNU): Clay Matvick, Kirk Morrison

Game information

First quarter

- TAMU – Christian Kirk 27-yard pass from Kellen Mond (Daniel LaCamera kick), 11:39. Aggies 7–0. Drive: 8 plays, 79 yards, 3:21.
- TAMU – Trayveon Williams 17-yard run (Daniel LaCamera kick), 2:58. Aggies 14–0. Drive: 8 plays, 81 yards, 2:47.

Second quarter

- NICH – Lorran Fonseca 37-yard field goal, 13:10. Aggies 14–3. Drive: 11 plays, 55 yards, 4:48.
- NICH – Lorran Fonseca 34-yard field goal, 0:47. Aggies 14–6. Drive: 15 plays, 75 yards, 6:16.

Third quarter

- No scoring plays

Fourth quarter

- NICH – Stephen LeBouef 5-yard pass from Chase Fourcade (Mason Roberts pass from Chase Fourcade for two-point conversion), 12:05. Tied 14–14. Drive: 4 plays, 66 yards, 1:36.
- TAMU – Kendall Bussey 2-yard run (Daniel LaCamera kick), 7:34. Aggies 21–14. Drive: 11 plays, 75 yards, 4:31.
- TAMU – Daniel LaCamera 26-yard field goal, 0:18. Aggies 24–14. Drive: 15 plays, 64 yards, 6:13.

Leading Passers

- NICH – Chase Fourcade – 13/25, 264 yards, TD, INT
- TAMU – Kellen Mond – 12/21, 105 yards, TD

Leading Rushers

- NICH – Kyran Irvin – 16 carries, 62 yards
- TAMU – Kendall Bussey – 15 carries, 97 yards, TD

Leading Receivers

- NICH – Damion Jeanpiere, Jr. – 5 receptions, 174 yards
- TAMU – Christian Kirk – 6 receptions, 47 yards, TD

=== Louisiana ===
Week Three: Louisiana–Lafayette Ragin' Cajuns at Texas A&M Aggies – Game summary

Quarter	1	2	3	4	Total
Ragin' Cajuns	0	21	0	0	21
Aggies	7	7	17	14	45

at Kyle Field, College Station, TX

- Date: September 16
- Game time: 11:00 a.m. CDT
- Game weather: Temperature: 81 °F (27 °C) • weather: cloudy • wind: SSE 8 MPH
- Game attendance: 98,412
- Referee: Matt Austin
- TV announcers (SECN): Dave Neal and Matt Stinchcomb

Game information

First quarter

- TAMU – Christian Kirk 1-yard pass from Kellen Mond (Daniel LaCamera kick), 3:43. Aggies 7–0. Drive: 4 plays, 51 yards, 1:37.

Second quarter

- ULL – Trey Ragas 3-yard run (Calvin Linden kick), 14:10. Tied 7–7. Drive: 4 plays, 12 yards, 1:51.
- TAMU – Jhamon Ausbon 24-yard pass from Kellen Mond (Daniel LaCamera kick), 13:52. Aggies 14–7. Drive: 1 play, 24 yards, 0:18.
- ULL – Ryheem Malone 8-yard pass from Jordan Davis (Stevie Artigue kick), 9:15. Tied 14–14. Drive: 6 plays, 37 yards, 3:00.
- ULL – Jordan Wright 1-yard pass from Jordan Davis (Stevie Artigue kick), 0:07. Ragin' Cajuns 21–14. Drive: 13 plays, 81 yards, 2:55.

Third quarter

- TAMU – Kellen Mond 5-yard run (Daniel LaCamera kick), 10:27. Tied 21–21. Drive: 9 plays, 81 yards, 2:19.
- TAMU – Camron Buckley 12-yard pass from Kellen Mond (Daniel LaCamera kick), 6:23. Aggies 28–21. Drive: 10 plays, 74 yards, 3:04.
- TAMU – Daniel LaCamera 28-yard field goal, 0:43. Aggies 31–21. Drive: 11 plays, 67 yards, 3:41.

Fourth quarter

- TAMU – Tyrel Dodson 40-yard interception return (Daniel LaCamera kick), 14:51. Aggies 38–21. Drive: 3 plays, 12 yards, 0:52.
- TAMU – Jacob Kibodi 67-yard run (Daniel LaCamera kick), 6:41. Aggies 45–21. Drive: 2 plays, 61 yards, 0:54.

Leading Passers

- ULL – Jordan Davis – 27/43, 197 yards, 2 TD, 3 INT
- TAMU – Kellen Mond – 21/34, 301 yards, 3 TD, INT

Leading Rushers

- ULL – Trey Ragas – 14 carries, 93 yards, TD
- TAMU – Jacob Kibodi – 4 carries, 101 yards, TD

Leading Receivers

- ULL – Keenan Barnes – 12 receptions, 118 yards
- TAMU – Damion Ratley – 2 receptions, 86 yards

=== Arkansas ===
Week Four: Texas A&M Aggies VS Arkansas Razorbacks – Game summary

Quarter	1	2	3	4	OT	Total
Aggies	7	10	7	19	7	50
Razorbacks	7	14	7	15	0	43

at AT&T Stadium, Arlington, TX

- Date: September 23
- Game time: 11:00 a.m.
- Game weather: Played indoors (retractable roof closed)
- Game attendance: 64,668
- Referee: John McDaid
- TV announcers (ESPN): Bob Wischusen and Brock Huard

Game information

First quarter

- ARK – Jared Cornelius 6-yard pass from Austin Allen (Connor Limpert kick), 9:04. Razorbacks 7–0. Drive: 7 plays, 65 yards, 3:27.
- TAMU – Christian Kirk 81-yard pass from Kellen Mond (Daniel LaCamera kick), 8:02. Tied 7-7. Drive: 3 plays, 85 yards, 1:02.

Second quarter

- ARK – David Williams 2-yard pass from Cole Kelley (Connor Limpert kick), 14:54. Razorbacks 14–7. Drive: 11 plays, 82 yards, 5:25.
- ARK – Chase Hayden 6-yard run (Connor Limpert kick), 10:21. Razorbacks 21–7. Drive: 2 plays, 30 yards, 0:31.
- TAMU – Daniel LaCamera 27-yard field goal, 8:03. Razorbacks 21–10. Drive: 5 plays, 79 yards, 2:18.
- TAMU – Trayveon Williams 18-yard run (Daniel LaCamera kick), 1:57. Razorbacks 21–17. Drive: 6 plays, 82 yards, 2:14.

Third quarter

- TAMU – Keith Ford 23-yard run (Daniel LaCamera kick),8:48. Aggies 24–21. Drive: 9 plays, 71 yards, 3:37.
- ARK – David Williams 1-yard run (Connor Limpert kick), 1:53. Razorbacks 28–24. Drive: 6 plays, 71 yards, 2:11.

Fourth quarter

- TAMU – Daniel LaCamera 37-yard field goal, 11:40. Razorbacks 28–27. Drive: 13 plays, 56 yards, 5:13.
- TAMU – Keith Ford 44-yard run (Kellen Mond drop-kick failed), 8:46. Aggies 33–28. Drive: 3 plays, 53 yards, 0:47.
- ARK – Jonathan Nance 44-yard pass from Austin Allen (Jeremy Patton pass), 5:21. Razorbacks 36–33. Drive: 7 plays, 79 yards, 3:25.
- TAMU – Christian Kirk 100-yard kickoff return (Daniel LaCamera kick), 5:10. Aggies 40–36.
- ARK – David Williams 4-yard run (Connor Limpert kick), 3:39. Razorbacks 43–40. Drive: 4 plays, 75 yards, 1:31.
- TAMU – Daniel LaCamera 27-yard field goal, 0:04. Tied 43–43. Drive: 11 plays, 40 yards, 3:35.

Overtime

- TAMU – Christian Kirk 10-yard pass from Kellen Mond (Daniel LaCamera kick), Aggies 50–43. Drive: 3 plays, 25 yards, 0:00.

Leading passers

- TAMU – Kellen Mond – 14/27, 216 yards, 2 TD, INT
- ARK – Austin Allen – 12/25, 229 yards, 2 TD, INT

Leading rushers

- TAMU – Kellen Mond – 10 carries, 109 yards
- ARK – Chase Hayden – 13 carries, 77 yards, TD

Leading receivers

- TAMU – Christian Kirk – 5 receptions, 110 yards, 2 TD
- ARK – Jonathan Nance – 3 receptions, 100 yards, TD

=== South Carolina ===
Week Five: South Carolina Gamecocks at Texas A&M Aggies – Game summary

Quarter	1	2	3	4	Total
Gamecocks	0	10	7	0	17
Aggies	0	7	3	14	24

at Kyle Field, College Station, TX

- Date: September 30
- Game time: 6:30 p.m.
- Game weather: Temperature: 83 °F (28 °C) • weather: partly cloudy • wind: ENE 5 MPH
- Game attendance: 96,430
- Referee: Matt Loeffler
- TV announcers (SEC Network): Tom Hart and Jordan Rodgers

Game information

First quarter

- No scoring plays

Second quarter

- TAMU – Trayveon Williams 1-yard run (Daniel LaCamera kick), 14:45. Aggies 7–0. Drive: 10 plays, 55 yards, 4:33.
- SC – Shi Smith 45-yard pass from Jake Bentley (Parker White kick), 12:45. Tied 7–7. Drive: 5 plays, 75 yards, 2:00.
- SC – Parker White 29-yard field goal, 9:12. Gamecocks 10–7. Drive: 6 plays, 39 yards, 2:30.

Third quarter

- SC – OrTre Smith 13-yard pass from Jake Bentley (Parker White kick), 9:24. Gamecocks 17–7. Drive: 6 plays, 80 yards, 2:17.
- TAMU – Daniel LaCamera 46-yard field goal, 0:59. Gamecocks 17–10. Drive: 12 plays, 55 yards, 2:26.

Fourth quarter

- TAMU – Keith Ford 7-yard run (Daniel LaCamera kick), 12:27. Tied 17–17. Drive: 7 plays, 55 yards, 2:26.
- TAMU – Keith Ford 17-yard run (Daniel LaCamera kick), 7:42. Aggies 24–17. Drive: 5 plays, 46 yards, 2:12.

Leading Passers

- SC – Jake Bentley – 17/30, 256 yards, 2 TD
- TAMU – Kellen Mond – 19/27, 159 yards

Leading Rushers

- SC – Ty'Son Williams – 14 carries, 73 yards
- TAMU – Kellen Mond – 16 carries, 95 yards

Leading Receivers

- SC – Shi Smith – 3 receptions, 86 yards, TD
- TAMU – Jhamon Ausbon – 3 receptions, 43 yards

=== Alabama ===
Week Six: No. 1 Alabama Crimson Tide at Texas A&M Aggies – Game summary

Quarter	1	2	3	4	Total
No. 1 Crimson Tide	7	10	7	3	27
Aggies	3	0	7	9	19

at Kyle Field, College Station, TX

- Date: October 7
- Game time: 6:15 p.m.
- Game weather: Temperature: 89 °F (32 °C) • Weather: sunny • Wind: N 6 MPH
- Game attendance: 101,058
- Referee: Matt Austin
- TV announcers (ESPN): Joe Tessitore and Todd Blackledge

Game information

First quarter

- TAMU – Daniel LaCamera 52-yard field goal, 9:59. Aggies 3–0. Drive: 5 plays, 36 yards, 1:37.
- ALA – Damien Harris 75-yard run (Andy Pappanastos kick), 9:46. Crimson Tide 7–3. Drive: 1 play, 75 yards, 0:13.

Second quarter

- ALA – Andy Pappanastos 34-yard field goal, 5:41. Crimson Tide 10–3. Drive: 12 plays, 75 yards, 4:33.
- ALA – Jalen Hurts 1-yard run (Andy Pappanastos kick), 3:16. Crimson Tide 17–3. Drive: 4 plays, 43 yards, 1:49.

Third quarter

- ALA – Henry Ruggs 8-yard pass from Jalen Hurts (Andy Pappanastos kick), 11:01. Crimson Tide 24–3. Drive: 9 plays, 75 yards, 3:59.
- TAMU – Christian Kirk 2-yard pass from Kellen Mond (Daniel LaCamera kick), 1:39. Crimson Tide 24–10. Drive: 8 plays, 36 yards, 5:11.

Fourth quarter

- TAMU – J. K. Scott punt blocked by Cullen Gillaspia, 10:18. Crimson Tide 24–12. Drive: 3 plays, 2 yards, 1:27.
- ALA – Andy Pappanastos 44-yard field goal, 2:09. Crimson Tide 27–12. Drive: 10 plays, 52 yards, 4:40.
- TAMU – Kellen Mond 1-yard run (Daniel LaCamera kick), 0:17. Crimson Tide 27–19. Drive: 7 plays, 64 yards, 1:52.

Leading Passers

- ALA – Jalen Hurts – 13/22, 123 yards, TD
- TAMU – Kellen Mond – 19/29, 237 yards, TD, INT

Leading Rushers

- ALA – Damien Harris – 14 carries, 124 yards, TD
- TAMU – Trayveon Williams – 15 carries, 38 yards

Leading Receivers

- ALA – Calvin Ridley – 5 receptions, 68 yards
- TAMU – Trayveon Williams – 4 receptions, 60 yards

=== Florida ===
Week Seven: Texas A&M Aggies at Florida Gators – Game summary

Quarter	1	2	3	4	Total
Aggies	3	0	7	9	19
Gators	3	7	0	7	17

at Ben Hill Griffin Stadium, Gainesville, FL

- Date: October 14
- Game time: 6:00 p.m.
- Game weather: Temperature: 83 °F (28 °C) • Weather: fair, humidity 64% • Wind: E 10 MPH
- Game attendance: 86,114
- Referee: Hubert Owens
- TV announcers (ESPN2): Beth Mowins, Anthony Becht and Rocky Boiman

Game information

First quarter

- FLA – Eddy Pineiro 29-yard field goal, 7:47. Gators 3–0. Drive: 13 plays, 63 yards, 5:49.
- TAMU – Daniel LaCamera 46-yard field goal, 2:08. Tied 3–3. Drive: 7 plays, 38 yards, 2:33.

Second quarter

- FLA – La'Mical Perine 15-yard run (Eddy Pineiro kick), 1:41. Gators 10–3. Drive: 7 plays, 55 yards, 2:58.

Third quarter

- TAMU – Kellen Mond 9-yard run (Daniel LaCamera kick), 11:12. Tied 10–10. Drive: 6 plays, 55 yards, 1:39.

Fourth quarter

- FLA – Dre Massey 6-yard run (Eddy Pineiro kick), 14:54. Gators 17–10. Drive: 4 plays, 90 yards, 1:50.
- TAMU – Daniel LaCamera 43-yard field goal, 12:35. Gators 17–13. Drive: 7 plays, 40 yards, 2:19.
- TAMU – Daniel LaCamera 25-yard field goal, 7:37. Gators 17–16. Drive: 9 plays, 57 yards, 2:37.
- TAMU – Daniel LaCamera 32-yard field goal, 0:58. Aggies 19–17. Drive: 9 plays, 24 yards, 3:22.

Leading Passers

- TAMU – Kellen Mond – 8/24, 180 yards, INT
- FLA – Feleipe Franks – 17/26, 129 yards, 2 INT

Leading Rushers

- TAMU – Kellen Mond – 15 carries, 52 yards, TD
- FLA – Malik Davis – 18 carries, 97 yards

Leading Receivers

- TAMU – Damion Ratley – 2 receptions, 72 yards
- FLA – Brandon Powell – 5 receptions, 37 yards

=== Mississippi State ===
Week Nine: Mississippi State Bulldogs at Texas A&M Aggies – Game summary

Quarter	1	2	3	4	Total
Bulldogs	7	7	14	7	35
Aggies	0	0	7	7	14

at Kyle Field, College Station, TX

- Date: October 28
- Game time: 6:15 p.m.
- Game weather: Temperature: 60 °F (16 °C) • Weather: mostly sunny • Wind: NNW 11 MPH
- Game attendance: 96,128
- Referee: Ken Williamson
- TV: ESPN

Game information

First quarter

- MSU – Nick Fitzgerald 2-yard run (Jace Christmann kick), 3:34. Bulldogs 7–0. Drive: 16 plays, 86 yards, 8:13.

Second quarter

- MSU – Donald Gray 8 yard pass from Nick Fitzgerald (Jace Christmann kick), 3:30. Bulldogs 14–0. Drive: 4 plays, 53 yards, 1:34.

Third quarter

- MSU – Jordan Thomas 10-yard pass from Nick Fitzgerald (Jace Christmann kick), 11:47. Bulldogs 21–0. Drive: 6 plays, 73 yards, 2:49.
- TAMU – Keith Ford 1-yard run (Daniel LaCamera kick), 8:20. Bulldogs 21–7. Drive: 10 plays, 76 yards, 3:27.
- MSU – Nick Gibson 14-yard run (Jace Christmann kick), 5:00. Bulldogs 28–7. Drive: 3 plays, 32 yards, 1:04.

Fourth quarter

- MSU – Jamal Peters 90-yard interception return (Jace Christmann kick), 7:23. Bulldogs 35–7. Drive: 12 plays, 58 yards, 3:10.
- TAMU – Camron Buckley 70-yard pass from Nick Starkel (Daniel LaCamera kick), 5:15. Bulldogs 35–14. Drive: 5 plays, 83 yards, 2:11.

Leading Passers

- MSU – Nick Fitzgerald – 12/21, 141 yards, 2 TD, INT
- TAMU – Nick Starkel – 8/15, 133 yards, TD, INT

Leading Rushers

- MSU – Nick Fitzgerald – 18 carries, 105 yards, TD
- TAMU – Kellen Mond – 6 carries, 32 yards

Leading Receivers

- MSU – Farrod Green – 3 receptions, 51 yards
- TAMU – Camron Buckley – 1 receptions, 88 yards, TD

=== Auburn ===
Week Ten: No. 16 Auburn Tigers at Texas A&M Aggies – Game summary

Quarter	1	2	3	4	Total
No. 16 Tigers	0	21	14	7	42
Aggies	3	10	7	7	27

at Kyle Field, College Station, TX

- Date: November 4
- Game time: 11:00 a.m.
- Game weather: Temperature: 76 °F (24 °C) • Wind: S 9 MPH • Weather: cloudy
- Game attendance: 100,257
- Referee: James Carter
- TV announcers (ESPN): Beth Mowins, Anthony Becht and Rocky Boiman

Game information

First quarter

- TAMU – Daniel LaCamera 39-yard field goal, 12:02. Aggies 3–0. Drive: 9 plays, 54 yards, 2:58.

Second quarter

- AUB – Kerryon Johnson 2-yard pass from Jarrett Stidham (Daniel Carlson kick), 10:50. Tigers 7–3. Drive: 12 plays, 75 yards, 3:54.
- TAMU – Keith Ford 2-yard run (Daniel LaCamera kick), 4:01. Aggies 10–7. Drive: 9 plays, 80 yards, 3:11.
- TAMU – Daniel LaCamera 25-yard field goal, 2:39. Aggies 13–7. Drive: 5 plays, 43 yards, 0:57.
- AUB – Darius Slayton 53-yard pass from Jarrett Stidham (Daniel Carlson kick), 1:36. Tigers 14–13. Drive: 4 plays, 75 yards, 1:03.
- AUB – Malik Miller 0-yard blocked punt return (Daniel Carlson kick), 0:20. Tigers 21–13. Drive: 3 plays, 6 yards, 1:16.

Third quarter

- AUB – Ryan Davis 4-yard pass from Jarred Stidham (Daniel Carlson kick), 10:45. Tigers 28–13. Drive: 5 plays, 64 yards, 1:51.
- AUB – Kerryon Johnson 2-yard run (Daniel Carlson kick), 8:48. Tigers 35–13. Drive: 3 plays, 47 yards, 0:53.
- TAMU – Damion Ratley 62-yard pass from Nick Starkel (Daniel LaCamera kick), 6:09. Tigers 35–20. Drive: 6 plays, 75 yards, 2:39.

Fourth quarter

- AUB – Eli Stove 4-yard run (Daniel Carlson kick), 5:08. Tigers 42–20. Drive: 13 plays, 96 yards, 8:17.
- TAMU – Damion Ratley 8-yard pass from Nick Starkel (Daniel LaCamera kick), 3:11. Tigers 42–27. Drive: 7 plays, 28 yards, 1:57.

Leading Passers

- AUB – Jarrett Stidham – 20/27, 268 yards, 3 TD
- TAMU – Nick Starkel – 11/22, 184 yards, 2 TD

Leading Rushers

- AUB – Kerryon Johnson – 29 carries, 145 yards, TD
- TAMU – Trayveon Williams – 15 carries, 103 yards

Leading Receivers

- AUB – Darius Slayton – 2 receptions, 99 yards, TD
- TAMU – Damion Ratley – 4 receptions, 82 yards, 2 TD

=== New Mexico ===
Week Eleven: New Mexico Lobos at Texas A&M Aggies – Game summary

Quarter	1	2	3	4	Total
Lobos	0	7	7	0	14
Aggies	13	35	0	7	55

at Kyle Field, College Station, TX

- Date: November 11
- Game time: 6:00 p.m.
- Game weather: Temperature: 72 °F (22 °C) • Wind: ESE 7 MPH • Weather: clear
- Game attendance: 99,051
- Referee: Kevin Boitmann
- TV: ESPNU

Game information

First quarter

- TAMU – Christian Kirk 60-yard pass from Nick Starkel (Daniel LaCamera PAT failed), 14:32. Aggies 6–0. Drive: 2 plays, 75 yards, 0:28.
- TAMU – Jhamon Ausbon 10-yard pass from Nick Starkel (Daniel LaCamera kick), 7:32. Aggies 13–0. Drive: 13 plays, 81 yards, 5:14.

Second quarter

- TAMU – Keith Ford 12-yard run (Daniel LaCamera kick), 14:01. Aggies 20–0. Drive: 7 plays, 97 yards, 2:25.
- TAMU – Damion Ratley 1-yard pass from (Daniel LaCamera kick), 9:27. Aggies 27–0. Drive: 10 plays, 56 yards, 3:00.
- TAMU – Christian Kirk 90-yard punt return (Daniel LaCamera kick), 7:31. Aggies 34–0.
- TAMU – Damion Ratley 36-yard pass from Nick Starkel (Daniel LaCamera kick), 5:21. Aggies 41–0. Drive: 3 plays, 70 yards, 1:05.
- TAMU – Trayveon Williams 7-yard run (Daniel LaCamera kick), 1:40. Aggies 48–0. Drive: 5 plays, 77 yards, 1:24.
- UNM – Elijah Lilly 100-yard kickoff return (Jason Sanders kick), 1:24. Aggies 48–7.

Third quarter

- UNM – Daryl Chestnut 3-yard run (Jason Sanders kick), 1:13. Aggies 48–14. Drive: 14 plays, 80 yards, 7:49.

Fourth quarter

- TAMU – Cameron Buckley 7-yard pass from Kellen Mond (Daniel LaCamera kick), 13:08. Aggies 55–14. Drive: 8 plays, 75 yards, 3:05.

Leading Passers

- UNM – Lamar Jordan – 4/9, 15 yards, INT
- TAMU – Nick Starkel – 21/30, 416 yards, 4 TD

Leading Rushers

- UNM – Tyrone Owens – 18 carries, 58 yards
- TAMU – Trayveon Williams – 7 carries, 28 yards, TD

Leading Receivers

- UNM – Jay Griffin IV – 4 receptions, 15 yards
- TAMU – Roshauud Paul – 7 receptions, 129 yards

=== Ole Miss ===
Week Twelve: Texas A&M Aggies at Ole Miss Rebels – Game summary

Quarter	1	2	3	4	Total
Aggies	14	7	7	3	31
Rebels	14	10	0	0	24

at Vaught–Hemingway Stadium, Oxford, MS

- Date: November 18
- Game time: 6:00 p.m.
- Game weather: Temperature: 55 °F (13 °C) • Wind: NW 15 MPH • Weather: cloudy
- Game attendance: 55,880
- Referee: Matt Austin
- TV: ESPN2

Game information

First quarter

- MISS – A. J. Brown 27-yard pass from Jordan Ta'amu (Gary Wunderlich kick), 12:29. Rebels 7–0. Drive: 7 plays, 70 yards, 2:31.
- TAMU – Keith Ford 1-yard run (Daniel LaCamera kick), 7:01. Tied 7–7. Drive: 10 plays, 75 yards, 5:28.
- MISS – Jordan Wilkins 64-yard run (Gary Wunderlich kick), 6:41. Rebels 14–7. Drive: 1 play, 64 yards, 0:20.
- TAMU – Damion Ratley 10-yard pass from Nick Starkel (Daniel LaCamera kick), 4:17. Tied 14–14. Drive: 7 plays, 81 yards, 2:24.

Second quarter

- MISS – Braylon Sanders 30-yard pass from Joran Ta'amu (Gary Wunderlich kick), 4:24. Rebels 21–14. Drive: 8 plays, 82 yards, 3:19.
- TAMU – Nick Starkel 1-yard run (Daniel LaCamera kick), 1:57. Tied 21–21. Drive: 8 plays, 80 yards, 2:27.
- MISS – Gary Wunderlich 28-yard field goal, 0:24. Rebels 24–21. Drive: 8 plays, 54 yards, 1:33.

Third quarter

- TAMU – Derrick Tucker 19-yard interception return (Daniel LaCamera kick), 8:04. Aggies 28–24. Drive: 2 plays, 2 yards, 0:40.

Fourth quarter

- TAMU – Daniel LaCamera 18-yard field goal, 1:59. Aggies 31–24. Drive: 11 plays, 47 yards, 4:48.

Leading Passers

- TAMU – Nick Starkel – 19/32, 272 yards, TD, INT
- MISS – Jordan Ta'amu – 19/34, 189 yards, 2 TD, INT

Leading Rushers

- TAMU – Trayveon Williams – 26 carries, 75 yards
- MISS – Jordan Wilkins – 19 carries, 147 yards, TD

Leading Receivers

- TAMU – Damion Ratley – 5 receptions, 111 yards, TD
- MISS – A. J. Brown – 7 receptions, 70 yards, TD

=== LSU ===
Week Thirteen: Texas A&M Aggies at No. 19 LSU Tigers – Game summary

Quarter	1	2	3	4	Total
Aggies	0	7	14	0	21
No. 19 Tigers	13	7	14	11	45

at Tiger Stadium

- Date: November 25
- Game time: 6:30 p.m.
- Game weather: Temperature: 57 °F (14 °C) • Wind: N 2 MPH • Weather: clear
- Game attendance: 97,675
- Referee: Ken Williamson
- TV: SECN

Game information

First quarter

- LSU – Jack Gonsoulin 46-yard field goal, 9:52. Tigers 3–0. Drive: 9 plays, 59 yards, 4:06.
- LSU – Jack Gonsoulin 33-yard field goal, 6:27. Tigers 6–0. Drive: 6 plays, 7 yards, 2:52.
- LSU – Russell Gage 11-yard pass from Danny Etling (Josh Gonsoulin kick), 4:23. Tigers 13–0. Drive: 4 plays, 61 yards, 1:13.

Second quarter

- LSU – Darrel Williams 1-yard run (Josh Gonsoulin kick), 7:29. Tigers 20–0. Drive: 7 plays, 76 yards, 2:47.
- TAMU – Trayveon Williams 2-yard run (Daniel LaCamera kick), 0:21. Tigers 20–7. Drive: 8 plays, 70 yards, 1:05.

Third quarter

- TAMU – Damion Ratley 45-yard pass from Nick Starkel (Daniel LaCamera kick), 13:20. Tigers 20–14. Drive: 5 plays, 75 yards, 1:40.
- LSU – Derrius Guice 1-yard run (Connor Culp kick), 8:52. Tigers 27–14. Drive: 7 plays, 39 yards, 2:46.
- TAMU – Christian Kirk 10-yard pass from Nick Starkel (Daniel LaCamera kick), 5:21. Tigers 27–21. Drive: 10 plays, 75 yards, 3:31.
- LSU – J.D. Moore 10-yard pass from Danny Etling (Connor Culp kick), 2:51. Tigers 34–21. Drive: 5 plays, 71 yards, 2:22.

Fourth quarter

- LSU – D. J. Chark 9-yard pass from Danny Etling (Danny Etling pass to Foster Moreau), 13:18. Tigers 42–21. Drive: 5 plays, 83 yards, 1:34.
- LSU – Connor Culp 26-yard field goal, 7:53. Tigers 45–21. Drive: 9 plays, 67 yards, 4:23.

Leading Passers

- TAMU – Nick Starkel – 16/30, 227 yards, 2 TD, 2 INT
- LSU – Danny Etling – 19/30, 347 yards, 3 TD

Leading Rushers

- TAMU – Trayveon Williams – 17 carries, 56 yards, TD
- LSU – Derrius Guice – 28 carries, 127 yards, TD

Leading Receivers

- TAMU – Christian Kirk – 7 receptions, 78 yards, TD
- LSU – D. J. Chark – 5 receptions, 86 yards, TD

== Rankings ==
Ranking movements Legend: ██ Increase in ranking ██ Decrease in ranking — = Not ranked RV = Received votes
	Week															
Poll	Pre	1	2	3	4	5	6	7	8	9	10	11	12	13	14	Final
AP	RV	—	—	—	—	RV	RV	RV	RV	—	—	RV	—	RV	—	—
Coaches	RV	—	—	—	RV	RV	RV	24	24	RV	—	RV	—	RV	—	—
CFP	Not released									—	—	—	—	—	—	Not released
