= Kevin Sumlin =

American football player and coach (born 1964)

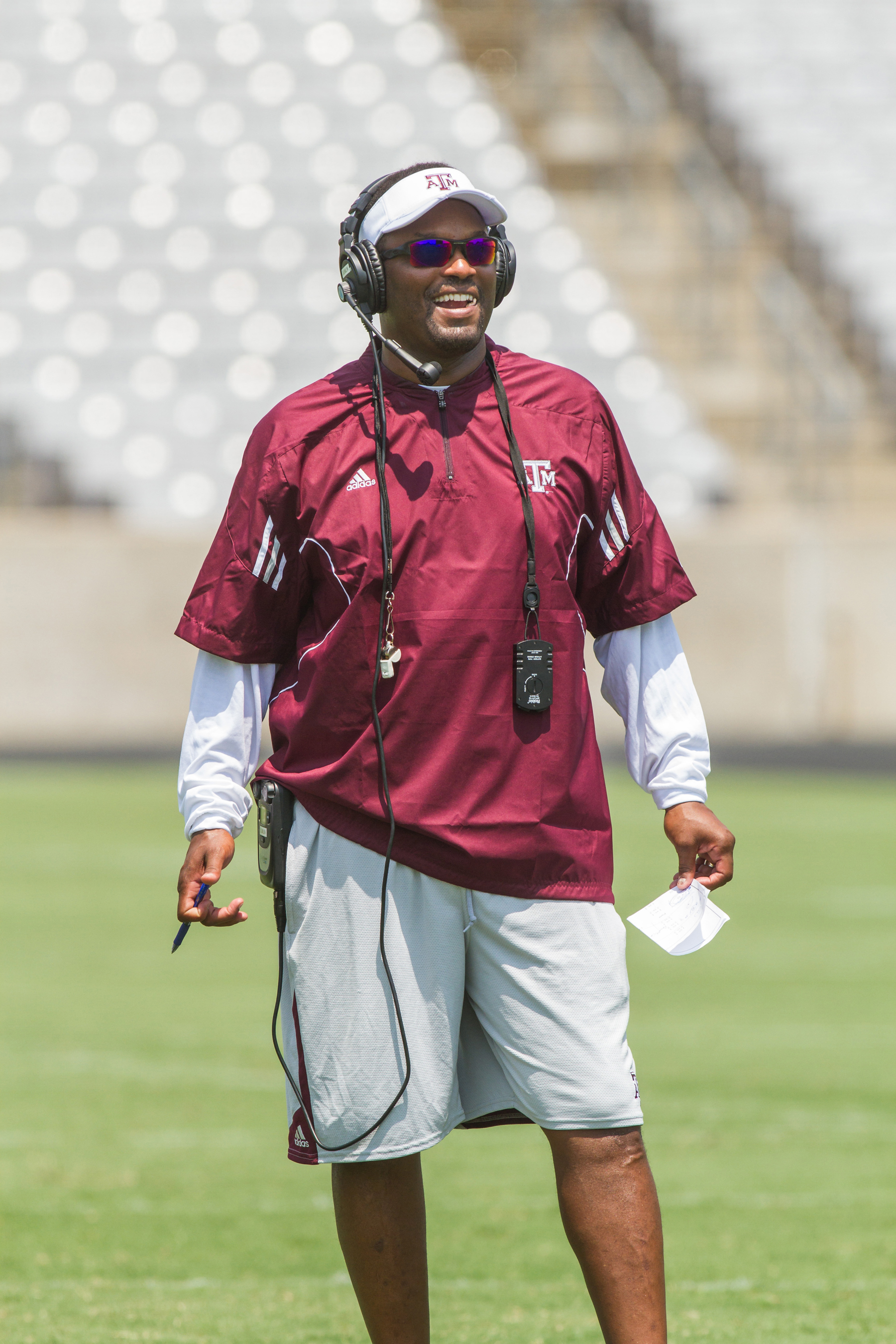
- Sumlin during his tenure at Texas A&M

Personal information
- Born: August 3, 1964 (age 62); Brewton, Alabama, U.S.

Career information
- Position: Linebacker (No. 44)
- College: Purdue (1983–1986)
- NFL draft: 1987: undrafted

Career history
- Washington State (1989–1990) Graduate assistant; Wyoming (1991–1992) Wide receivers coach; Minnesota (1993–1996) Wide receivers coach; Minnesota (1997) Quarterbacks coach; Purdue (1998–2000) Wide receivers coach; Texas A&M (2001) Assistant head coach & Wide receivers coach; Texas A&M (2002) Offensive coordinator & assistant head coach & wide receivers coach; Oklahoma (2003–2005) Tight ends & special teams coach; Oklahoma (2006–2007) Co-offensive coordinator & wide receivers coach; Houston (2008–2011) Head coach; Texas A&M (2012–2017) Head coach; Arizona (2018–2020) Head coach; Alabama (2021) Analyst; Houston Gamblers (2022) Head coach; Maryland (2023–2024) Assistant head coach & co-offensive coordinator & tight ends; Houston Gamblers (2026) Head coach; Dallas Renegades (2027) Head coach

Awards and highlights
- 2× C-USA Coach of the Year (2009, 2011); SEC Coach of the Year (2012)

Head coaching record
- Regular season: USFL/UFL: 7–13 (.350); NCAA: 91–60 (.603)
- Postseason: USFL/UFL: 0–0 (–); NCAA: 4–3 (.571)
- Career: USFL/UFL: 7–13 (.350); NCAA: 95–63 (.601)

Kevin Warren Sumlin (born August 3, 1964) is an American football coach who is currently the head coach for the Dallas Renegades of the United Football League (UFL). Sumlin served as the head football coach at the University of Houston from 2008 to 2011, Texas A&M University from 2012 to 2017, and at the University of Arizona from 2018 to 2020. Sumlin was formerly the associate head coach, co-offensive coordinator, and tight ends coach for the University of Maryland.

== Early life ==
Sumlin was born in Brewton, Alabama, on August 3, 1964. He later attended Brebeuf Jesuit Preparatory School in Indianapolis, where he played football, basketball, and ice hockey.

Following his prep career, Sumlin attended Purdue University and was a starting linebacker throughout his entire college career. He was a member of the 1984 Peach Bowl team and finished in the top 10 in total tackles with 375 (191 solo, 184 assisted) and in the top 20 in solo tackles with 191. He led the team in tackles during his freshman season of 1983 with 91 total tackles, (50 solo, 41 assisted). He was a teammate of players such as Jim Everett, Hall of Famer Rod Woodson, fellow linebacker Fred Strickland, and long-time NFL players Mel Gray and Cris Dishman.

== Coaching career ==
=== Early years ===
Sumlin served as an assistant coach at Washington State, Wyoming, Minnesota, and Purdue (all, except for Minnesota, alongside Joe Tiller); served as assistant head coach at Texas A&M for two years under R.C. Slocum; and for five years at Oklahoma under Bob Stoops, serving the last two years as co-offensive coordinator. In addition to Stoops and Slocum, he has served as an assistant coach under Mike Price at Washington State and Joe Tiller at Purdue. While at Purdue, offensive coordinator Jim Chaney and he aided Tiller in implementing the then-uncommonly used spread offense, and the Boilermakers, with Drew Brees as starting quarterback, broke a string of Big Ten passing records and made a surprise run to the 2001 Rose Bowl, Purdue's first Rose Bowl in three decades. He left for Texas A&M to serve as the offensive coordinator and assistant head coach for two seasons before joining the University of Oklahoma.

In his final year with the Oklahoma Sooners, Sumlin's offense was one of the best in the country, averaging 44 points per game.

=== Head coaching career ===
In December 2007, Sumlin was hired as the head coach of the University of Houston. In December 2009, Sumlin was announced as a finalist for the Paul "Bear" Bryant Award. In 2011, Sumlin coached Houston to a 12–0 start before losing the Conference USA Championship Game to the Southern Miss Golden Eagles.

On December 10, 2011, Sumlin told his players he was leaving Houston, effective immediately, to accept a job at another school. KRIV in Houston and ESPN's Joe Schad both reported that Sumlin was to become the new coach at Texas A&M University. Special-teams coordinator Tony Levine coached Houston in the 2012 TicketCity Bowl.

In 2012, Sumlin named quarterback Johnny Manziel his starter. Manziel went on to win the Heisman Trophy and Sumlin took Texas A&M, in their first year in the Southeastern Conference, to an 11–2 record, including victories over then No. 1 Alabama in Tuscaloosa, and No. 11 Oklahoma in the AT&T Cotton Bowl. The Aggies finished the 2012 season ranked in the top five of both the Coaches Poll and the AP Poll for the first time since 1956. Texas A&M also led the SEC in total offense, total scoring offense, and total rushing yards, and led the nation in third down conversion percentage. Sumlin and the Aggies became the first SEC team in history to amass over 7,000 yards in total offense. Coach Sumlin was the first head coach to win more than eight games in his first season as head coach.

On November 30, 2013, Sumlin agreed to a new six-year contract as head coach at Texas A&M. The contract, valued at $30 million over six years, was guaranteed. If Texas A&M had fired him after the 2015 and 2016 seasons, the buyout amounts ($20 million and $15 million, respectively) would have had to be paid out within 60 days of termination.

On November 21, 2017, news outlets reported that Sumlin would be fired following the 2017 season finale against LSU. On November 26, 2017, Sumlin was fired after six seasons. He compiled a 51–26 record during his tenure. Despite never posting a losing record as the coach of A&M, he only won more than nine games once, and only had one winning record in SEC play. Sumlin received a $10.4 million buyout under the terms of his contract, and was replaced by Jimbo Fisher for the 2018 season.

On January 14, 2018, Sumlin was hired as the University of Arizona's head coach. Sumlin suffered perhaps the worst defeat of his coaching career when his University of Arizona team lost to their traditional in-state rival Arizona State on December 11, 2020, by a score of 70–7. The following day, Sumlin was fired.

On January 6, 2022, Sumlin was named the head coach and general manager for the Houston Gamblers of the United States Football League. Sumlin's Gamblers finished 3–7 in his lone season and did not qualify for the postseason.

=== Return to college coaching ===
On February 14, 2023, Sumlin was hired as the University of Maryland's associate head coach, co-offensive coordinator, and tight ends coach. At the conclusion of the 2024 season, Sumlin was fired by Maryland for an off field incident regarding Sumlin facing DUI charges.

== Head coaching record ==
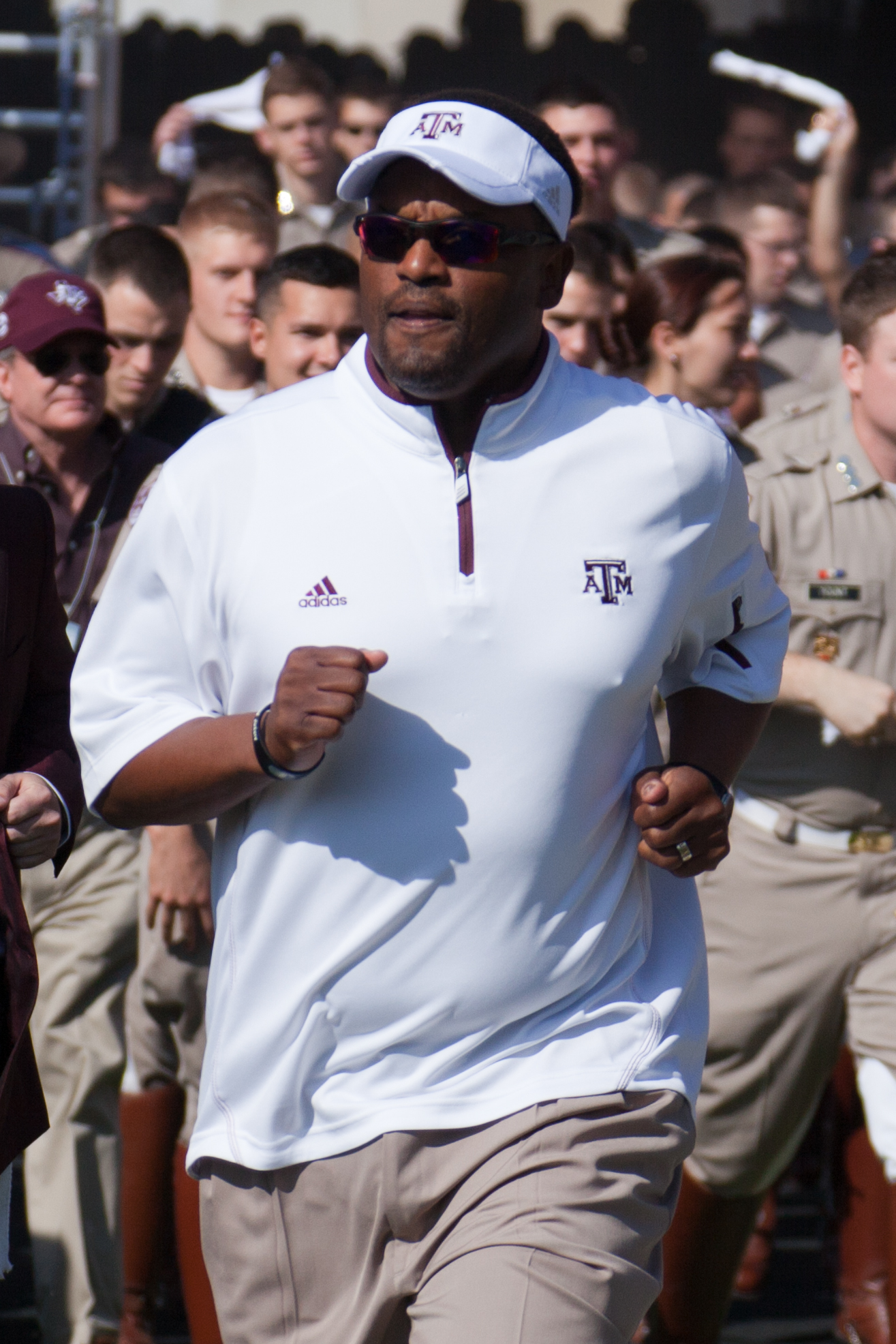
Kevin Sumlin as Texas A&M Coach – October 2012 against LSU

=== College ===
Year	Team	Overall	Conference	Standing	Bowl/playoffs	Coaches^{#}	AP^{°}
Houston Cougars (Conference USA) (2008–2011)
2008	Houston	8–5	6–2	3rd (West)	W Armed Forces		
2009	Houston	10–4	6–2	1st (West)	L Armed Forces		
2010	Houston	5–7	4–4	3rd (West)			
2011	Houston	12–1 (Note: Sumlin left for Texas A&M University following the regular season. Tony Levine served as interim head coach for the Cougars in the TicketCity Bowl. Houston finished the season with an overall record of 13–1.)	8–0	1st (West)	TicketCity	14	18
Houston:		35–17	24–8				
Texas A&M Aggies (Southeastern Conference) (2012–2017)
2012	Texas A&M	11–2	6–2	T–2nd (West)	W Cotton	5	5
2013	Texas A&M	9–4	4–4	4th (West)	W Chick-fil-A	18	18
2014	Texas A&M	8–5	3–5	5th (West)	W Liberty		
2015	Texas A&M	8–5	4–4	T–5th (West)	L Music City		
2016	Texas A&M	8–5	4–4	4th (West)	L Texas		
2017	Texas A&M	7–5 (Note: Sumlin was fired after the regular season. Jeff Banks served as interim head coach for the Aggies in the Belk Bowl. Texas A&M finished the season with an overall record of 7–6.)	4–4	T–4th (West)	Belk		
Texas A&M:		51–26	25–23				
Arizona Wildcats (Pac-12 Conference) (2018–2020)
2018	Arizona	5–7	4–5	T–3rd (South)			
2019	Arizona	4–8	2–7	6th (South)			
2020	Arizona	0–5	0–5	6th (South)			
Arizona:		9–20	6–17				
Total:		95–63					
National championship Conference title Conference division title or championship game berth
^{#}Rankings from final Coaches Poll.; ^{°}Rankings from final AP Poll.

=== USFL/UFL ===
Team	Year	Regular season					Postseason			
Team	Year	Won	Lost	Ties	Win %	Finish	Won	Lost	Win %	Result
HOU	2022	3	7	0	.300	4th (South Division)	—	—	—	—
HOU	2026	4	6	0	.400	7th	—	—	—	—
Total		7	13	0	.350		—	—	—	—
