= Jeff Banks (American football) =

American football player and coach (born 1975)

Current position
- Title: Assistant head coach/special teams coordinator/tight ends coach
- Team: Texas
- Conference: SEC

Biographical details
- Born: April 8, 1975 (age 51)

Playing career
- 1993: San Diego State
- 1994–1995: Citrus
- 1996–1997: Washington State
- Position: Punter

Coaching career (HC unless noted)
- 1999–2000: Washington State (GA/K)
- 2001–2003: Idaho State (RB/ST)
- 2004–2012: UTEP (RB/ST)
- 2013–2017: Texas A&M (TE/ST)
- 2017: Texas A&M (interim HC)
- 2018–2020: Alabama (TE/ST)
- 2021–present: Texas (AHC/TE/ST)

Head coaching record
- Overall: 0–1
- Bowls: 0–1

Accomplishments and honors

Championships
- As an Assistant: CFP National Champion (2020)

Awards
- Second-team All-Pac-10 (1997)

Jeff Banks (born April 8, 1975) is an American football coach and former player. He is the assistant head coach, tight ends coach, and special teams coordinator at the University of Texas, a position he has held since 2021. Banks served as the interim head coach at Texas A&M University at the end of the 2017 season coach in the Aggies in the 2017 Belk Bowl, following the firing of Kevin Sumlin. Following that, Banks became the special teams coordinator and tight end coach at the University of Alabama from 2018–2021 until being hired by new head coach at the University of Texas, Steve Sarkisian.

== Playing career ==
Banks played football at Bishop Amat Memorial High School, graduating in 1993. He started his college career at San Diego State University, where he redshirted for the 1993 season. Following the season, SDSU fired head coach Al Luginbill, and Banks transferred to Citrus College, a community college in Glendora, California. Banks played in the 1994 and 1995 seasons as a punter and then transferred to Washington State University.

== Coaching career ==
Following his graduation from Washington State, Banks joined Mike Price's staff as a graduate assistant. He spent the 1999 and 2000 seasons there before moving on to Idaho State. He spent the next three seasons at Idaho State before reuniting with Price at the University of Texas at El Paso in 2004. Banks departed UTEP after the 2012 season to become the running backs coach/special teams coordinator at Virginia, but resigned after nine days to take the same job at Texas A&M. Larry Lewis, who had coached Banks during his playing days at Washington State, replaced him.

== Head coaching record ==
Year	Team	Overall	Conference	Standing	Bowl/playoffs
Texas A&M Aggies (Southeastern Conference) (2017)
2017	Texas A&M	0–1 (Note: Banks served as interim head coach for the Belk Bowl, following the firing of Kevin Sumlin. Texas A&M finished the season with an overall record of 7–6 and tied for fourth place the Southeastern Conference's West Division with a conference mark of 4–4.)	0–0		L Belk
Texas A&M:		0–1	0–0		
Total:		0–1			
