= 2017 Belk Bowl =

- 16th Belk Bowl
Wake Forest Demon Deacons	Texas A&M Aggies
(7–5)	(7–5)
ACC	SEC
55	52
Head coach: Dave Clawson	Head coach: Jeff Banks (interim)
	1	2	3	4	Total
Wake Forest	17	21	3	14	55
Texas A&M	14	14	14	10	52
- Date: December 29, 2017
- Season: 2017
- Stadium: Bank of America Stadium
- Location: Charlotte, North Carolina
- MVP: John Wolford (QB, Wake Forest)
- Referee: Steve Strimling (Pac-12)
- Attendance: 32,784

United States TV coverage
- Network: ESPN
- Announcers: TV: Jason Benetti, Kelly Stouffer, Kris Budden; Radio: Matt Schick, Mike Golic Jr., TBD

The 2017 Belk Bowl was a postseason college football bowl game played at Bank of America Stadium in Charlotte, North Carolina on December 29, 2017. The game was the 16th edition of the Belk Bowl and featured the Wake Forest Demon Deacons of the Atlantic Coast Conference and the Texas A&M Aggies of the Southeastern Conference. It was one of the 2017–18 bowl games concluding the 2017 FBS football season. The game was sponsored by department store chain Belk.

== Teams ==
=== Wake Forest ===
The Wake Forest Demon Deacons finished the 2017 regular season with a 7–5 record. The game was the team's second appearance in the bowl; they made their first appearance in 2007, when the game was known as the Meineke Car Care Bowl.

=== Texas A&M ===
The Texas A&M Aggies finished the 2017 regular season with a 7–5 record. The game was the team's first appearance in the bowl.

== Game summary ==
=== Scoring summary ===
Scoring summary

Quarter	Time	Drive			Team	Scoring information	Score	
Quarter	Time	Plays	Yards	TOP	Team	Scoring information	WF	A&M
1	12:48	–	–	–	A&M	Charles Oliver 0-yard blocked punt return for a touchdown	0	7
1	11:04	3	55	0:31	A&M	Trayveon Williams 2-yard touchdown run, Daniel LaCamera kick good	0	14
1	8:47	6	69	2:17	WF	Scotty Washington 50-yard touchdown reception from John Wolford, Mike Weaver kick good	7	14
1	5:47	5	50	1:07	WF	Tabari Hines 7-yard touchdown reception from John Wolford, Mike Weaver kick good	14	14
1	1:33	5	70	0:56	WF	28-yard field goal by Mike Weaver	17	14
2	13:25	9	83	2:13	WF	Tabari Hines 7-yard touchdown reception from John Wolford, Mike Weaver kick good	24	14
2	12:21	–	–	–	WF	Jessie Bates 59-yard punt return for a touchdown	31	14
2	7:31	3	75	0:50	A&M	Christian Kirk 52-yard touchdown reception from Nick Starkel, Daniel LaCamera kick good	31	21
2	4:33	3	47	0:53	WF	Cam Serigne 37-yard touchdown reception from John Wolford, Mike Weaver kick good	38	21
2	0:18	9	80	1:59	A&M	Christian Kirk 10-yard touchdown reception from Nick Starkel, Daniel LaCamera kick good	38	28
3	12:51	4	64	0:58	A&M	Christian Kirk 9-yard touchdown reception from Nick Starkel, Daniel LaCamera kick good	38	35
3	5:55	10	75	2:19	WF	27-yard field goal by Mike Weaver	41	35
3	1:59	7	67	1:57	A&M	Keith Ford 1-yard touchdown run, Daniel LaCamera kick good	41	42
4	12:39	7	35	2:50	A&M	19-yard field goal by Daniel LaCamera	41	45
4	9:06	11	69	3:33	WF	Cade Carney 1-yard touchdown run, Mike Weaver kick good	48	45
4	5:52	10	72	3:14	A&M	Jhamon Ausbon 13-yard touchdown reception from Nick Starkel, Daniel LaCamera kick good	48	52
4	2:18	13	69	3:34	WF	Matt Colburn 1-yard touchdown run, Mike Weaver kick good	55	52
"TOP" = time of possession. For other American football terms, see Glossary of American football.							55	52

=== Statistics ===
	1	2	3	4	Total
Demon Deacons	17	21	3	14	55
Aggies	14	14	14	10	52

Statistics	WF	A&M
First downs	31	32
Plays–yards	97–646	94–614
Rushes–yards	48–246	31–115
Passing yards	400	499
Passing: Comp–Att–Int	32–49	42–63–1
Time of possession	30:10	29:50

Team	Category	Player	Statistics
WF	Passing	John Wolford	32–49, 400 yards, 4 TDs
WF	Rushing	Matt Colburn	21 rushes, 150 yards, 1 TD
WF	Receiving	Scotty Washington	9 receptions, 138 yards, 1 TD
A&M	Passing	Nick Starkel	42–63, 499 yards, 4 TDs, 1 INT
A&M	Rushing	Trayveon Williams	7 rushes, 65 yards, 1 TD
A&M	Receiving	Christian Kirk	13 receptions, 189 yards, 3 TDs
