= Scotty Washington =

American football player (born 1997)

Profile
- Position: Tight end

Personal information
- Born: July 26, 1997 (age 29); Washington, D.C., U.S.
- Listed height: 6 ft 5 in (1.96 m)
- Listed weight: 242 lb (110 kg)

Career information
- High school: St. John's (Washington, D.C.)
- College: Wake Forest
- NFL draft: 2020: undrafted

Career history
- Cincinnati Bengals (2020–2021)*; New England Patriots (2022); Pittsburgh Steelers (2023)*; Baltimore Ravens (2023–2025)
- * Offseason or practice squad member only
- Stats at Pro Football Reference

Anthony "Scotty" Washington (born July 26, 1997) is an American professional football tight end. After playing college football for the Wake Forest Demon Deacons, he signed with the Cincinnati Bengals as an undrafted free agent in 2020.

== College career ==
Washington played college football at Wake Forest from 2015 to 2019. After redshirting his first year in 2015, he didn't see the field until 2016. Washington finished 2016 with 155 yards in 10 receptions and no touchdowns. In 2017, Washington had his best season, finishing with 45 receptions, 711 yards and three touchdowns. In 2018, Washington finished with 243 yards on 20 receptions and three touchdowns. In his senior season, Washington finished with 607 yards on 35 receptions and seven touchdowns in only eight games played.

== Professional career ==
Pre-draft measurables
| Height | Weight | Arm length | Hand span |
|---|---|---|---|
| 6 ft 5 3/8 in (1.97 m) | 217 lb (98 kg) | 33 7/8 in (0.86 m) | 9 1/2 in (0.24 m) |
All values from Pro Day

=== Cincinnati Bengals ===
Washington signed with the Cincinnati Bengals as an undrafted free agent following the 2020 NFL draft on April 27, 2020. Washington was waived by the Bengals on September 5, 2020, and signed to the practice squad the next day. Washington spent all of the 2020 and 2021 seasons on the team's practice squad. He was waived on August 22, 2022.

=== New England Patriots ===
On September 20, 2022, Washington was signed to the New England Patriots practice squad. On a Christmas Eve game against his former team, the Bengals, Washington was involved in a trick play, on a 3rd and 29, Patriots quarterback Mac Jones targeted Washington in the end zone and batted the ball back to Jakobi Meyers for a touchdown. He signed a reserve/future contract on January 10, 2023. He was waived on August 27, 2023.

=== Pittsburgh Steelers ===
On October 24, 2023, Washington was signed to the Pittsburgh Steelers practice squad. He was released on November 14, 2023.

=== Baltimore Ravens ===
On November 20, 2023, Washington was signed to the Baltimore Ravens practice squad. He signed a reserve/future contract on January 29, 2024. He was waived on August 20, 2024. Washington was re-signed to the practice squad on November 27, 2024.

On August 2, 2025, Washington signed with the Baltimore Ravens. He was waived on August 26, as part of final roster cuts. On November 4, he re-signed with the Ravens practice squad.
