= Keith Ford =

American football player (born 1994)

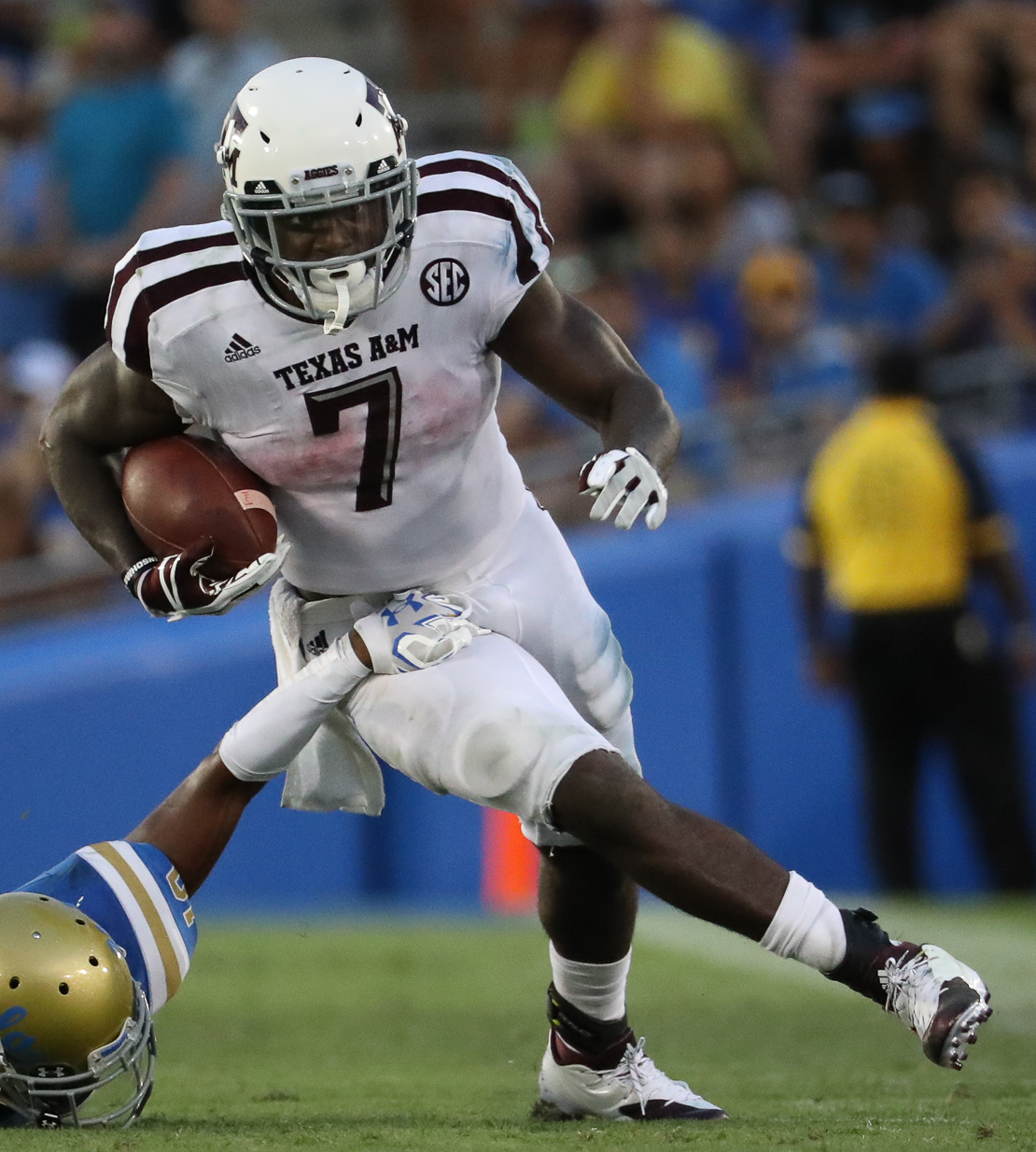
- Ford with Texas A&M in 2017

Profile
- Position: Running back

Personal information
- Born: April 18, 1994 (age 32); Houston, Texas, U.S.
- Listed height: 5 ft 10 in (1.78 m)
- Listed weight: 219 lb (99 kg)

Career information
- High school: Cypress Ranch (Cypress, Texas)
- College: Texas A&M
- NFL draft: 2018: undrafted

Career history
- Buffalo Bills (2018); Indianapolis Colts (2019)*; Green Bay Packers (2019)*; St. Louis BattleHawks (2020); Arlington Renegades (2023)
- * Offseason or practice squad member only

Career NFL statistics
- Rushing attempts: 21
- Rushing yards: 79
- Receptions: 3
- Receiving yards: 21
- Stats at Pro Football Reference

Keith Ford (born April 18, 1994) is an American professional football running back. He played college football for the Oklahoma Sooners and Texas A&M Aggies. He was originally signed by the Buffalo Bills as an undrafted free agent in 2018, and was also a member of the Indianapolis Colts and Green Bay Packers.

== Early life ==
Growing up, Ford's family moved often as his father, Keith Ford Sr., served in the United States Marine Corps. This included a seven-year stay in Okinawa, Japan until his father retired and the family moved to Cypress, Texas. Ford attended Cypress Ranch High School, where he played football, basketball, and ran track. As a senior, Ford rushed for 1,868 yards on 280 carries, scoring 24 touchdowns and participated in the Under Armour All-America Game. Ford led his Mustang team to a regional final playoff appearance, where they were defeated by the eventual state champion, Katy High School, by a score of 70-21. A five-star recruit, he was the third-ranked running back prospect in the nation and ultimately committed to the University of Oklahoma.

== College career ==
=== Oklahoma ===
As a freshman Ford appeared in ten games, rushing for 134 yards and one touchdown on 23 carries. He rushed 71 times for 392 yards (third most on the team) and scored six total touchdowns in eight games as a sophomore, but lost his starting job to true freshman Samaje Perine while out due to injury. Ford was suspended indefinitely from the football team due to academic and team rules violations. Nine days later, Ford announced that he would be transferring and ultimately decided to move on to Texas A&M.

=== Texas A&M ===
After sitting out one season due to NCAA transfer rules, Ford was the Aggies second-leading rusher with 669 yards as a redshirt junior. As a senior, he rushed for 548 yards and led the team with 12 rushing touchdowns. Over the course of his collegiate career, Ford rushed for 1,743 yards on 359 carries (4.9 yards per carry) and 24 touchdowns in 44 games.

== Professional career ==
=== Buffalo Bills ===
Ford signed with the Buffalo Bills as an undrafted free agent on April 28, 2018. He was cut by the Bills at the end of the preseason and subsequently re-signed to the team's practice squad on September 2, 2018. Ford was promoted to the Bills' active roster on December 12, 2018 after an injury to starting running back LeSean McCoy.

Ford made his NFL debut on December 16, 2018 in a 14–13 win against the Detroit Lions, rushing for a team-high 46 yards on 14 carries and catching a pass for seven yards. He made his first career start the next week on December 23, 2018 in a 24–12 loss to the New England Patriots, again leading the team in rushing with 33 yards on seven carries and catching two passes for 14 yards. As a rookie, Ford appeared in two games (one start) with 79 yards rushing on 21 carries and three receptions for 21 yards.

On May 13, 2019, Ford was waived by the Bills.

=== Indianapolis Colts ===
Ford was signed by the Indianapolis Colts on July 28, 2019. He was waived on August 5, 2019.

=== Green Bay Packers ===
On August 6, 2019, Ford was claimed off waivers by the Green Bay Packers. He was released on August 31, 2019.

=== St. Louis BattleHawks ===
Ford signed with the St. Louis BattleHawks of the XFL on January 9, 2020. Ford rushed ten times for 52 yards and two touchdowns before the 2020 XFL season was cancelled following growing concerns about the COVID-19 virus. He had his contract terminated when the league suspended operations on April 10, 2020.

=== Arlington Renegades ===
Ford was selected by the Arlington Renegades in the 2023 XFL draft.
