= Duke Ejiofor =

American football player (born 1995)

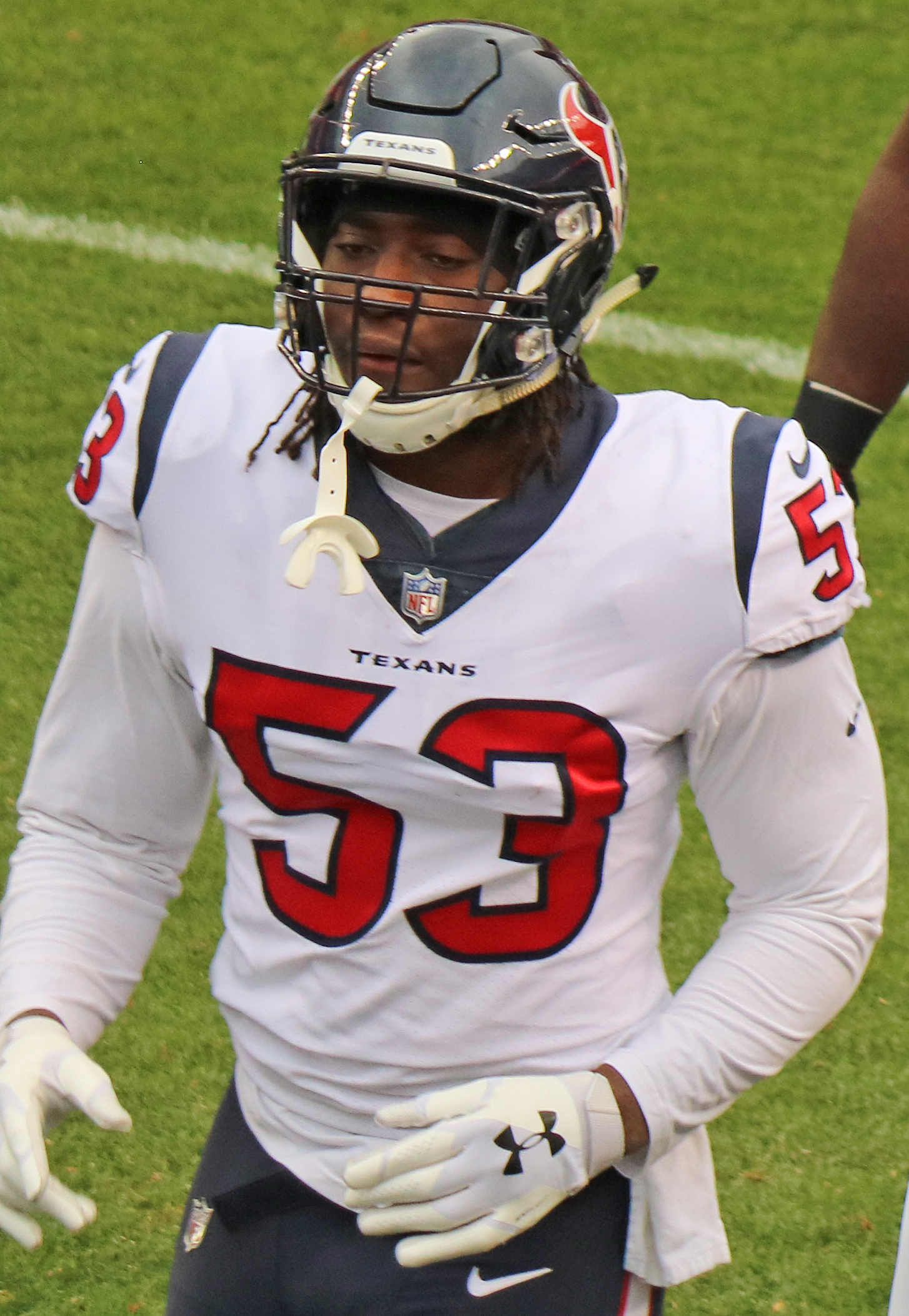
- Ejiofor with the Houston Texans in 2018

No. 53
- Position: Linebacker

Personal information
- Born: April 24, 1995 (age 31); Houston, Texas, U.S.
- Listed height: 6 ft 4 in (1.93 m)
- Listed weight: 255 lb (116 kg)

Career information
- High school: Alief Taylor (Houston)
- College: Wake Forest
- NFL draft: 2018: 6th round, 177th overall pick

Career history
- Houston Texans (2018–2021); Atlanta Falcons (2022)*; Houston Roughnecks (2023)
- * Offseason or practice squad member only

Awards and highlights
- Second-team All-ACC (2017)

Career NFL statistics
- Total tackles: 9
- Sacks: 1
- Fumble recoveries: 1
- Stats at Pro Football Reference

Duke Ejiofor (born April 24, 1995) is an American former professional football player who was a linebacker in the National Football League (NFL). He played college football for the Wake Forest Demon Deacons, and was selected by the Houston Texans in the sixth round of the 2018 NFL draft.

== College career ==
As a junior at Wake Forest, Ejiofor had 50 tackles, 17 for losses, 10.5 sacks, one interception and two forced fumbles. He recorded 47 tackles including 15 for losses, eight sacks and six pass breakups as a senior.

== Professional career ==
Pre-draft measurables
Height	Weight	Arm length	Hand span
6 ft 3 3/8 in (1.91 m)	264 lb (120 kg)	34 7/8 in (0.89 m)	9 3/4 in (0.25 m)
All values from NFL Combine

=== Houston Texans ===
Ejiofor was selected by the Houston Texans in the sixth round, 177th overall, of the 2018 NFL draft. In Week 2, against the Tennessee Titans, he recorded his first career sack in his NFL debut.

On May 10, 2019, Ejiofor was placed on injured reserve after suffering a season-ending torn Achilles.

On August 21, 2020, Ejiofor was placed on injured reserve for a second consecutive season after suffering a torn ACL. On June 9, 2021, Ejiofor was waived with a failed physical designation.

=== Atlanta Falcons ===
On January 13, 2022, Ejiofor signed a reserve/future contract with the Atlanta Falcons. He was released on March 9, 2022.

=== Houston Roughnecks ===
On November 17, 2022, Ejiofor was selected by the Houston Roughnecks of the XFL. He was placed on the reserve list by the team on February 20, 2023. He was released on June 21, 2023.

== Personal life ==
Ejiofor is descended from Nigerian royalty.
