= Ocean Lakes High School =

Public high school in Virginia Beach, Virginia

Location
- 885 Schumann Drive; Virginia Beach, Virginia 23454; United States; 36°46′17.6″N 75°58′53.4″W

Information
- School type: Public, high school
- Founded: 1994
- Locale: City, Large
- School district: Virginia Beach City Public Schools
- NCES District ID: 5103840
- Superintendent: Donald Robertson
- NCES School ID: 510384001046
- Principal: Leslie Ittner
- Teaching staff: 106.40 (on an FTE basis)
- Grades: 9–12
- Enrollment: 1,834 (2024–25)
- Student to teacher ratio: 17.24
- Language: English
- Colors: Blue, Bre Gray, White, and Gold
- Athletics conference: Virginia High School League; Beach District; VHSL Group 5A South Region
- Nickname: Dolphins
- Rival: Kellam High School
- Communities served: Oceana
- Website: Official site

Ocean Lakes High School (OLHS) is a public high school in Virginia Beach, Virginia, and is located in Virginia Beach City Public Schools.

== Math and Science Academy ==
A notable feature of Ocean Lakes high school is the Math and Science Academy, started in 1996 as the first of several magnet programs in Virginia Beach. Students throughout Virginia Beach who are interested in a math and science education can apply for admission to the academy. Admission is based on an essay, testing, and teacher recommendations. Students can enter the program in either 9th or 10th grade. Students enrolled in the academy take advanced courses in math, science, and English. By graduation, seniors in the Math and Science Academy must take at least calculus in math, and complete a "senior project". The senior project requires the student to either conduct a mentorship or research project in a math or science field. The student must then write either three case studies or a research paper and give a PowerPoint presentation on the work accomplished. Entry in the program requires completion of Algebra I prior to enrollment, positive instructor recommendations, above average grades, and excellent performance on an aptitude test.

== Ranking and critical response ==
Ocean Lakes was one of five Virginia Beach high schools ranked in the top 1,200 in Newsweek's 2006 ranking of American high schools.

== Sports ==
Ocean Lakes students participate in the following sports:

- Fall – cheerleading, cross country, field hockey, football, golf, volleyball, marching band
- Winter – cheerleading, basketball, gymnastics, wrestling, indoor track, swimming/diving
- Spring – baseball, soccer, tennis, track, softball, lacrosse

Eligibility requirements

- Must currently be enrolled in not fewer than five subjects.
- Must have passed five subjects the year/semester preceding participation.
- Must have a 2.0 GPA the semester preceding participation.
- Must have not reached the age of 19 on or before the first day of August of the current year.
- Must have a current school athletic physical form dated after May 1, 2025. Physicals should be turned in prior to tryout day on a VHSL form.

== Cheerleading ==
In 2006, the competition cheerleading team won the Beach District and regional competitions and were competitors in the state competition. In 2007, the competition cheerleading team placed 2nd in the Beach District, 4th in the Eastern Region, and 6th in the state competitions. In 2008, the competition cheerleading team placed 1st in Beach District and finished in 5th in Eastern Region.

== Scholastic Bowl ==
The 1999–2000 team was Ocean Lakes' most successful team to that point, placing fourth in the VHSL tournament. Today, Ocean Lakes remains successful in Scholastic Bowl, placing second to Thomas Jefferson High School for Science and Technology in the Group AAA state Tournament for the 2005–06 season. The 2023–24 team competed in the NAQT HSNCT where they placed 65th out of 320.

== Wrestling ==
The 2011–12 Dolphins team placed first in the Beach District and Eastern Regional Tournaments. They later proceeded to place 6th in the AAA State Tournament. They have also won the Virginia Duals American High School Division.

== Football ==
In 2012, the Dolphins football team advanced to the VHSL State Championship game but lost to L.C. Bird, 14–10. In 2014, Ocean Lakes returned to the championship game and defeated Centerville in overtime, 30–24.

== Swimming/Diving ==
The 2020–21 boys team became the fourth state champion team in Ocean Lakes history defeating second-place W. T. Woodson High School by 11.5 points. This marked the first win by a Beach District team since 2012.

== Gymnastics ==
In 2024, the Dolphins gymnastics team won the VHSL Class 5A state championship. This comes after going undefeated in their regular season.

== Notable alumni ==
- Mike Ballard – baseball player
- Bill Bray – baseball player
- Marcus Davis – football player
- Corey Fonville - drummer for Butcher Brown
- Teesha Green- actor
- Eli Harold – football player
- Helen Hou-Sandí – software engineer with significant contributions to WordPress and GitHub; accomplished pianist
- Justin Hunter – football player
- Scotty McGee – football player
- Shawn Morimando – Former MLB pitcher for the Cleveland Guardians
- Derrick Nnadi – football player, Super Bowl LIV Champion
- Levonta Taylor – football player
- Shamarko Thomas – football player
- Larry Vickers – college basketball coach and former player

== See also ==
- AAA Eastern Region
- AAA Beach District
