= 2017 Atlantic Coast Conference football season =

2017 ACC Football season
- League: NCAA Division I Football Bowl Subdivision
- Sport: Football
- Duration: August 31, 2017 to January 1, 2018
- Teams: 14

2018 NFL Draft
- Top draft pick: Bradley Chubb (NC State)
- Picked by: Denver Broncos, 5th overall

Regular Season
- Season MVP: Lamar Jackson
- Top scorer: Mike Weaver & Lamar Jackson (102 points)
- Atlantic champions: Clemson Tigers
- Atlantic runners-up: NC State Wolfpack
- Coastal champions: Miami Hurricanes
- Coastal runners-up: Virginia Tech Hokies

ACC Championship Game
- Champions: Clemson
- Runners-up: Miami
- Finals MVP: Kelly Bryant - QB, Clemson

Seasons
- ← 2016 2018 →

2017 Atlantic Coast Conference football standings
	Conf.			Overall
Team	W		L	W		L
Atlantic Division
No. 4 Clemson xy$^	7	–	1	12	–	2
No. 23 NC State	6	–	2	9	–	4
Wake Forest	4	–	4	8	–	5
Louisville	4	–	4	8	–	5
Boston College	4	–	4	7	–	6
Florida State	3	–	5	7	–	6
Syracuse	2	–	6	4	–	8
Coastal Division
No. 13 Miami (FL) xy	7	–	1	10	–	3
No. 24 Virginia Tech	5	–	3	9	–	4
Georgia Tech	4	–	4	5	–	6
Virginia	3	–	5	6	–	7
Pittsburgh	3	–	5	5	–	7
Duke	3	–	5	7	–	6
North Carolina	1	–	7	3	–	9
Championship: Clemson 38, Miami 3
^ – College Football Playoff participant; $ – Conference champion; x – Division champion/co-champions; y – Championship game participant; Rankings from AP Poll

The 2017 Atlantic Coast Conference football season was the 65th season of College Football play for the Atlantic Coast Conference (ACC). It was played from August 31, 2017, to January 1, 2018. The Atlantic Coast Conference consisted of 14 members in two divisions. It was part of the 2017 NCAA Division I FBS football season. The entire 2017 schedule was released on January 24, 2017. The defending ACC Champions were the Clemson Tigers. The Atlantic Division regular season champions were Clemson, and the Coastal Division regular season champions were Miami. The 2017 ACC Championship Game was played on December 2, 2017, in Charlotte, North Carolina. Clemson defeated Miami by a score of 38–3.

== Preseason ==
=== ACC Media days ===
==== Preseason Poll ====
The 2017 ACC Preseason Poll was announced following the ACC Football Kickoff meetings in Charlotte, North Carolina on July 13–14. Florida State and Miami were selected to win the Atlantic Division and Coastal Division, respectively. Lamar Jackson of Louisville was voted the Preseason ACC Player of the Year. It was voted on by 167 media members, all of which were in attendance for the ACC Football Kickoff.

ACC Championship Votes

1. Florida State – 118
2. Clemson – 35
3. Louisville – 7
4. Virginia Tech – 3
5. Miami – 3
6. Duke – 1

Atlantic Division
1. Florida State – 1,108 (121 First place votes)
2. Clemson – 1,007 (37)
3. Louisville – 843 (9)
4. NC State – 658
5. Wake Forest – 415
6. Syracuse – 362
7. Boston College – 283
Coastal Division
1. Miami – 1,065 (103)
2. Virginia Tech – 932 (40)
3. Georgia Tech – 708 (9)
4. Pittsburgh – 673 (7)
5. North Carolina – 606 (4)
6. Duke – 473 (4)
7. Virginia – 219

==== Preseason ACC Player of the year ====
1. Lamar Jackson, LOU – 113
2. Deondre Francois, FSU – 23
3. Christian Wilkins, CLEM – 11
4. Harold Landry, BC – 8
5. Jaylen Samuels, NCST – 7
6. Eric Dungey, CUSE–- 2
7. Shaquille Quarterman MIA, Ahmmon Richards MIA, Daniel Jones, DUKE – 1

==== Preseason All Conference Teams ====
===== Offense =====
Position	Player	Class	School
Wide receiver	Deon Cain	Junior	Clemson
Wide receiver	Ahmmon Richards	Sophomore	Miami
Wide receiver	Cam Phillips	Senior	Virginia Tech
Tight end	Cam Serigne	Senior (redshirt)	Wake Forest
Tackle	Mitch Hyatt	Junior	Clemson
Tackle	Brian O'Neill	Junior (redshirt)	Pittsburgh
Guard	Tyrone Crowder	Senior (redshirt)	Clemson
Guard	Wyatt Teller	Senior (redshirt)	Virginia Tech
Center	Alec Eberle	Junior (redshirt)	Florida State
Quarterback	Lamar Jackson	Junior	Louisville
Running back	Mark Walton	Junior	Miami
Running back	Dedrick Mills	Sophomore	Georgia Tech

===== Defense =====
Position	Player	Class	School
Defensive end	Harold Landry	Senior	Boston College
Defensive end	Bradley Chubb	Senior	NC State
Defensive tackle	Dexter Lawrence	Sophomore	Clemson
Defensive tackle	Christian Wilkins	Junior	Clemson
Linebacker	Micah Kiser	Senior (redshirt)	Virginia
Linebacker	Shaquille Quarterman	Sophomore	Miami
Linebacker	Tremaine Edmunds	Junior	Virginia Tech
Cornerback	Tarvarus McFadden	Junior	Florida State
Cornerback	Jaire Alexander	Junior	Louisville
Safety	Derwin James	Sophomore (redshirt)	Florida State
Safety	Quin Blanding	Senior	Virginia

===== Specialist =====
Position	Player	Class	School
Placekicker	Michael Badgley	Junior	Miami
Punter	A. J. Cole III	Junior	NC State
Specialist	Quadree Henderson	Junior	Pittsburgh

=== Recruiting classes ===
Rankings
Team	ESPN	Rivals	Scout	24/7	Signees
Boston College	63	66	68	66	21
Clemson	10	22	26	16	14
Duke	34	46	55	48	22
Florida State	4	5	8	6	23
Georgia Tech	43	41	52	47	24
Louisville	29	29	31	33	24
Miami	12	11	13	13	24
North Carolina	28	30	32	30	20
NC State	51	53	61	52	20
Pittsburgh	31	38	43	37	24
Syracuse	49	57	54	54	24
Virginia	48	57	57	54	25
Virginia Tech	25	28	18	25	26
Wake Forest	65	74	73	67	20

== Coaches ==
Note: Stats shown are before the beginning of the season

Team	Head coach	Years at school	Overall record	Record at school	ACC record
Boston College	Steve Addazio	5	34-29	21-18	10-22
Clemson	Dabo Swinney	10	75-35	75-35	55-15
Duke	David Cutcliffe	10	88-85	44-56	25-47
Florida State	Jimbo Fisher	7	68-14	68-14	45-11
Georgia Tech	Paul Johnson	10	175-78	67-39	42-30
Louisville	Bobby Petrino	8	113-43	71-22	19-7
Miami	Mark Richt	2	154-55	9-4	5-3
North Carolina	Larry Fedora	6	63-41	29-22	26-14
NC State	Dave Doeren	5	41-24	18-20	9-23
Pittsburgh	Pat Narduzzi	3	16-10	16-10	11-5
Syracuse	Dino Babers	2	41-20	4-8	2-6
Virginia	Bronco Mendenhall	2	101-53	2-10	1-7
Virginia Tech	Justin Fuente	2	36-27	10-4	6-2
Wake Forest	Dave Clawson	4	100-94	10-15	5-19

== Rankings ==
Legend
	Improvement in ranking
	Drop in ranking
	Not ranked previous week
RV	Received votes but were not ranked in Top 25 of poll

		Pre	Wk 1	Wk 2	Wk 3	Wk 4	Wk 5	Wk 6	Wk 7	Wk 8	Wk 9	Wk 10	Wk 11	Wk 12	Wk 13	Wk 14	Final
Boston College	AP																
Boston College	C																
Boston College	CFP	Not released															
Clemson	AP	5	3	3 (1)	2 (15)	2 (8)	2 (17)	2 (18)	7	7	6	4	4	4	1 (27)	1 (43)	4
Clemson	C	5 (7)	3 (3)	2 (2)	2 (6)	2 (4)	2 (6)	2 (8)	8	7	5	4	3	3	1 (25)	1 (49)	4
Clemson	CFP	Not released									4	4	2	3	1	1	
Duke	AP				RV	RV											
Duke	C			RV	RV	RV											
Duke	CFP	Not released															
Florida State	AP	3 (4)	10	11	12	RV	RV		RV								
Florida State	C	3 (4)	9	10	11	25	RV										
Florida State	CFP	Not released															
Georgia Tech	AP						RV	RV	RV	RV			RV				
Georgia Tech	C	RV	RV			RV	RV	RV	RV	RV							
Georgia Tech	CFP	Not released															
Louisville	AP	16	17	14	19	17	17	RV							RV	RV	
Louisville	C	17	16	14	20	18	17	RV							RV	RV	
Louisville	CFP	Not released															
Miami	AP	18	16	17	14	14	13	11	8	8	9	7	2	2	7	11	13
Miami	C	18	17	15	14	13	12	10	7	8	6	6	2	2	7	11	13
Miami	CFP	Not released									10	7	3	2	7	10	
North Carolina	AP																
North Carolina	C	RV															
North Carolina	CFP	Not released															
NC State	AP	RV				RV	24	20	16	14	20	RV	25	RV	RV	RV	23
NC State	C	RV	RV	RV	RV	RV	24	20	17	15	19	24	22	RV	RV	RV	23
NC State	CFP	Not released									20	23	19		24	24	
Pittsburgh	AP	RV	RV														
Pittsburgh	C	RV	RV														
Pittsburgh	CFP	Not released															
Syracuse	AP																
Syracuse	C	RV	RV														
Syracuse	CFP	Not released															
Virginia	AP							RV	RV								
Virginia	C								RV								
Virginia	CFP	Not released															
Virginia Tech	AP	21	18	16	13	12	16	15	14	13	13	17	RV	24	22	22	24
Virginia Tech	C	22	18	16	13	12	19	17	14	13	13	17	RV	25	21	22	25
Virginia Tech	CFP	Not released									13	17		25	22	22	
Wake Forest	AP				RV	RV								RV			
Wake Forest	C				RV	RV								RV			RV
Wake Forest	CFP	Not released															

== Schedule ==
Index to colors and formatting
ACC member won
ACC member lost
ACC teams in **bold**

† denotes Homecoming game

=== Regular season ===
==== Week 1 ====
Date	Time	Visiting team	Home team	Site	TV	Result	Attendance	Ref.
August 31	7:00 p.m.	Presbyterian	**Wake Forest**	BB&T Field • Winston-Salem, NC	ACCN Extra	**W** 51-7	22,643	
September 1	7:00 p.m.	Central Connecticut	**Syracuse**	Carrier Dome • Syracuse, NY	ACCN Extra	**W** 50-7	30,273	
September 1	9:30 p.m.	**Boston College**	Northern Illinois	Huskie Stadium • DeKalb, IL	CBSSN	**W** 23-20	16,421	
September 2	12:00 p.m.	Kent State	No. 5 **Clemson**	Memorial Stadium • Clemson, SC	ESPN	**W** 56-3	80,121	
September 2	12:20 p.m.	California	**North Carolina**	Kenan Memorial Stadium • Chapel Hill, NC	ACCN	**L** 30-35	49,500	
September 2	12:30 p.m.	Bethune–Cookman	No. 18 **Miami**	Hard Rock Stadium • Miami Gardens, FL	ACCRSN	**W** 41-13	50,454	
September 2	1:00 p.m.	Youngstown State	**Pittsburgh**	Heinz Field • Pittsburgh, PA	ACCN Extra	**W** 28-21 ^{OT}	40,012	
September 2	3:00 p.m.	South Carolina	**NC State**	Bank of America Stadium • Charlotte, NC (Belk Kickoff Game/Rivalry)	ESPN	**L** 28-35	50,367	
September 2	3:00 p.m.	William & Mary	**Virginia**	Scott Stadium • Charlottesville, VA	ACCN Extra	**W** 28-10	38,828	
September 2	6:00 p.m.	North Carolina Central	**Duke**	Wallace Wade Stadium • Durham, NC	ACCN Extra	**W** 60-7	30,477	
September 2	7:30 p.m.	Purdue	No. 16 **Louisville**	Lucas Oil Stadium • Indianapolis, IN	FOX	**W** 35-28	37,394	
September 2	8:00 p.m.	No. 1 Alabama	No. 3 **Florida State**	Mercedes-Benz Stadium • Atlanta, GA (Chick-fil-A Kickoff)	ABC	**L** 7-24	76,330	
September 3	7:20 p.m.	No. 22 West Virginia	No. 21 **Virginia Tech**	FedExField • Landover, MD (Black Diamond Trophy)	ABC	**W** 31-24	67,489	
September 4	8:00 p.m.	No. 25 Tennessee	**Georgia Tech**	Mercedes-Benz Stadium • Atlanta, GA (Chick-fil-A Kickoff)	ESPN	**L** 41-42 ^{2OT}	75,107	
^{#}Rankings from AP Poll released prior to game. All times are in Eastern Time.

==== Week 2 ====
Date	Time	Visiting team	Home team	Site	TV	Result	Attendance	Ref.
September 9	12:00 p.m.	Northwestern	**Duke**	Wallace Wade Stadium • Durham, NC	ESPNU	**W** 17-41	20,241	
September 9	12:00 p.m.	No. 17 **Louisville**	**North Carolina**	Kenan Memorial Stadium • Chapel Hill, NC	ESPN	**LOU** 47-35	47,000	
September 9	12:30 p.m.	Jacksonville State	**Georgia Tech**	Bobby Dodd Stadium • Atlanta, GA	ACCRSN	**W** 10-37	50,161	
September 9	1:00 p.m.	**Wake Forest**	**Boston College**	Alumni Stadium • Chestnut Hill, MA	ACCN Extra	**WAKE** 34-10	38,082	
September 9	3:30 p.m.	Delaware	No. 18 **Virginia Tech**	Lane Stadium • Blacksburg, VA	ACCN Extra	**W** 0-27	62,526	
September 9	3:30 p.m.	Indiana	**Virginia**	Scott Stadium • Charlottesville, VA	ACCN Extra	**L** 34-17	38,993	
September 9^{[a]}	2:30 p.m.	#16 **Miami**	Arkansas State	Centennial Bank Stadium • Jonesboro, AR		**Canceled**^{[a]}		
September 9	3:30 p.m.	Middle Tennessee	**Syracuse**	Carrier Dome • Syracuse, NY	ACCN Extra	**L** 23-30	29,731	
September 9	3:30 p.m.	**Pittsburgh**	No. 4 Penn State	Beaver Stadium • University Park, PA (Rivalry)	ABC	**L** 14-33	100,898	
September 9	6:00 p.m.	Marshall	**NC State**	Carter–Finley Stadium • Raleigh, NC	ACCN Extra	**W** 37-20	57,430	
September 9	7:00 p.m.	No. 13 Auburn	No. 3 **Clemson**	Memorial Stadium • Clemson, SC (Rivalry)	ESPN	**W** 14-6	81,799	
December 2^{[b]}	12:00 p.m.	Louisiana–Monroe	**Florida State**	Doak Campbell Stadium • Tallahassee, FL	ACCN	**W** 42-10	58,780	
^{#}Rankings from AP Poll released prior to game. All times are in Eastern Time.

^{^[a]}The game between Arkansas State and Miami was canceled due to the wake of Hurricane Irma due to travel concerns for the Hurricanes.
^{^[b]}The game between Florida State and Louisiana-Monroe, originally scheduled for 7:00 p.m., was moved up to 12:00 p.m. in advance of the arrival of Hurricane Irma, and later cancelled due to inclement weather.

==== Week 3 ====
Date	Time	Visiting team	Home team	Site	TV	Result	Attendance	Ref.
September 16	12:00 p.m.	Notre Dame	**Boston College**	Alumni Stadium • Chestnut Hill, MA (Holy War)	ESPN	**L** 20-49	44,500	
September 16	12:00 p.m.	Connecticut	**Virginia**	Scott Stadium • Charlottesville, VA	ESPNU	**W** 38-18	33,056	
September 16	12:00 p.m.	#9 Oklahoma State	**Pittsburgh**	Heinz Field • Pittsburgh, PA	ESPN	**L** 21-59	38,952	
September 16	12:20 p.m.	Furman	**NC State**	Carter–Finley Stadium • Raleigh, NC	ACCN	**W** 49-16	56,166	
September 16	12:30 p.m.	Baylor	**Duke**	Wallace Wade Stadium • Durham, NC	ACCRSN	**W** 34-20	26,714	
September 16	3:00 p.m.	Utah State	**Wake Forest**	BB&T Field • Winston-Salem, NC	ACCN Extra	**W** 46-10	27,971	
September 16	3:30 p.m.	Central Michigan	**Syracuse**	Carrier Dome • Syracuse, NY	ACCN Extra	**W** 41-17	33,004	
September 16	3:30 p.m.	**North Carolina**	Old Dominion	Foreman Field • Norfolk, VA	STADIUM	**W** 53-23	20,118	
September 16	3:30 p.m.	#16 **Virginia Tech**	East Carolina	Dowdy–Ficklen Stadium • Greenville, NC	CBSSN	**W** 64-17	43,776	
September 16^{[c]}		**Georgia Tech**	UCF	Spectrum Stadium • Orlando, FL		**Canceled**^{[c]}		
September 16	8:00 p.m.	#3 **Clemson**	#14 **Louisville**	Papa John's Cardinal Stadium • Louisville, KY	ABC	**CLEM** 47-21	55,588	
^{#}Rankings from AP Poll released prior to game. All times are in Eastern Time.

^{^[c]}The game between Georgia Tech and UCF was canceled due to the wake of Hurricane Irma due to UCF using their stadium for recovery efforts.

==== Week 4 ====
Date	Time	Visiting team	Home team	Site	TV	Result	Attendance	Ref.
September 22	8:00 p.m.	**Virginia**	Boise State	Albertsons Stadium • Boise, ID	ESPN2	**W** 42–23	33,947	
September 23	12:00 p.m.	Kent State	No. 19 **Louisville**	Papa John's Cardinal Stadium • Louisville, KY	RSN	**W** 42–3	47,812	
September 23	12:00 p.m.	**NC State**	No. 12 **Florida State**	Doak Campbell Stadium • Tallahassee, FL	ABC/ESPN2	**NCST** 27–21	73,541	
September 23	12:20 p.m.	**Pittsburgh**	**Georgia Tech**	Bobby Dodd Stadium • Atlanta, GA	ACC Network	**GT** 35–17	40,211	
September 23	2:00 p.m.	Old Dominion	No. 13 **Virginia Tech**	Lane Stadium • Blacksburg, VA	ACC Network Extra	**W** 38–0	65,632	
September 23	3:30 p.m.	**Boston College**	No. 2 **Clemson**	Memorial Stadium • Clemson, SC (Rivalry)	ESPN2	**CLEM** 34–7	80,525	
September 23	3:30 p.m.	**Duke**	**North Carolina**	Kenan Memorial Stadium • Chapel Hill, NC (Victory Bell)	ESPNU	**DUKE** 21–17	59,000	
September 23	3:30 p.m.	Toledo	No. 14 **Miami**	Hard Rock Stadium • Miami Gardens, FL	RSN	**W** 52–30	49,361	
September 23	3:30 p.m.	**Wake Forest**	Appalachian State	Kidd Brewer Stadium • Boone, NC	ESPN 3	**W** 20–19	35,126	
September 23	7:00 p.m.	**Syracuse**	No. 25 LSU	Tiger Stadium • Baton Rouge, LA	SECN	**L** 26–35	96,044	
^{#}Rankings from AP Poll released prior to game. All times are in Eastern Time.

==== Week 5 ====
Date	Time	Visiting team	Home team	Site	TV	Result	Attendance	Ref.
September 29	7:00 p.m.	No. 14 **Miami**	**Duke**	Wallace Wade Stadium • Durham, NC	ESPN2	**MIA** 31–6	36,314	
September 30	12:00 p.m.	**North Carolina**	**Georgia Tech**	Bobby Dodd Stadium • Atlanta, GA	ESPN2	**GT** 33–7	42,805	
September 30	12:00 p.m.	Rice	**Pittsburgh**	Heinz Field • Pittsburgh, PA	RSN	**W** 42–10	33,051	
September 30	12:20 p.m.	**Syracuse**	**NC State**	Carter–Finley Stadium • Raleigh, NC	ACCN	**NCST** 33–25	56,197	
September 30	1:00 p.m.	Central Michigan	**Boston College**	Alumni Stadium • Chestnut Hill, MA	ACCN Extra	**W** 28–8	27,036	
September 30	3:30 p.m.	**Florida State**	**Wake Forest**	BB&T Field • Winston-Salem, NC	ABC	**FSU** 26–19	31,588	
September 30	3:30 p.m.	Murray State	No. 17 **Louisville**	Papa John's Cardinal Stadium • Louisville, KY	RSN	**W** 55–10	47,826	
September 30	8:00 p.m.	No. 2 **Clemson**	No. 12 **Virginia Tech**	Lane Stadium • Blacksburg, VA	ABC	**CLEM** 31–17	65,632	
^{#}Rankings from AP Poll released prior to game. All times are in Eastern Time.

==== Week 6 ====
Date	Time	Visiting team	Home team	Site	TV	Result	Attendance	Ref.
October 5	8:00 p.m.	No. 17 **Louisville**	No. 24 **NC State**	Carter-Finley Stadium • Raleigh, NC	ESPN	**NCST** 39–25	56,107	
October 7	12:00 p.m.	**Wake Forest**	No. 2 **Clemson**†	Memorial Stadium • Clemson, SC	ESPN2	**CLEM** 28–14	80,567	
October 7	12:20 p.m.	**Duke**	**Virginia**	Scott Stadium • Charlottesville, VA	ACCN	**UVA** 28–21	38,638	
October 7	12:30 p.m.	**Pittsburgh**	**Syracuse**	Carrier Dome • Syracuse, NY (Rivalry)	RSN	**CUSE** 27–24	33,290	
October 7	3:30 p.m.	No. 21 Notre Dame	**North Carolina**	Kenan Memorial Stadium • Chapel Hill, NC	ABC	**L** 10–33	57,000	
October 7^{[b]}	3:30 p.m.	No. 13 **Miami**	**Florida State**	Doak Campbell Stadium • Tallahassee, FL (Rivalry)	ESPN	**MIA** 24–20	78,169	
October 7	7:15 p.m.	No. 16 **Virginia Tech**	**Boston College**	Alumni Stadium • Chestnut Hill, MA (Rivalry)	ESPN2	**VT** 23–10	32,057	
^{#}Rankings from AP Poll released prior to game. All times are in Eastern Time.

^{^[b]}The game between Florida State and Miami, originally scheduled to be played on September 16, was moved to October 7 due to the effects of Hurricane Irma.

==== Week 7 ====
Date	Time	Visiting team	Home team	Site	TV	Result	Attendance	Ref.
October 13	7:00 p.m.	No. 2 **Clemson**	**Syracuse**	Carrier Dome • Syracuse, NY	ESPN	**CUSE** 27–24	42,475	
October 14	12:00 p.m.	**Florida State**	**Duke**	Wallace Wade Stadium • Durham, NC	ESPN2	**FSU** 17–10	31,073	
October 14	12:00 p.m.	No. 20 **NC State**	**Pittsburgh**	Heinz Field • Pittsburgh, PA	RSN	**NCST** 35–17	41,124	
October 14	12:20 p.m.	**Boston College**	**Louisville**†	Papa John's Cardinal Stadium • Louisville, KY	ACC Network	**BC** 45–42	44,679	
October 14	3:30 p.m.	**Georgia Tech**	No. 11 **Miami**	Hard Rock Stadium • Miami, FL	ESPN	**MIA** 25–24	55,799	
October 14	3:30 p.m.	**Virginia**	**North Carolina**	Kenan Memorial Stadium • Chapel Hill, NC (South's Oldest Rivalry)	RSN	**UVA** 20–14	50,000	
^{#}Rankings from AP Poll released prior to game. All times are in Eastern Time.

==== Week 8 ====
Date	Time	Visiting team	Home team	Site	TV	Result	Attendance	Ref.
October 21	12:00 p.m.	Louisville	**Florida State**	Doak Campbell Stadium • Tallahassee, FL	ESPN	**LOU** 31–28	72,764	
October 21	12:20 p.m.	Pittsburgh	**Duke**	Wallace Wade Stadium • Durham, NC	ACCN	**PITT** 24–17	22,621	
October 21	12:30 p.m.	Boston College	**Virginia**	Scott Stadium • Charlottesville, VA	RSN	**BC** 41–10	39,216	
October 21	3:30 p.m.	Syracuse	No. 8 **Miami**	Hard Rock Stadium • Miami Gardens, FL	ESPN	**MIA** 27–19	56,158	
October 21	3:30 p.m.	North Carolina	No. 14 **Virginia Tech**	Lane Stadium • Blacksburg, VA	ESPN2	**VT** 59–7	65,632	
October 21	7:30 p.m.	Wake Forest	**Georgia Tech**†	Bobby Dodd Stadium • Atlanta, GA	ESPNU	**GT** 38–24	45,224	
^{#}Rankings from AP Poll released prior to game. All times are in Eastern Time.

==== Week 9 ====
Date	Time	Visiting team	Home team	Site	TV	Result	Attendance	Ref.
October 27	8:00 p.m.	**Florida State**	**Boston College**	Alumni Stadium • Chestnut Hill, MA	ESPN	**BC** 35–3	40,629	
October 28	12:00 p.m.	No. 8 **Miami**	**North Carolina**	Kenan Memorial Stadium • Chapel Hill, NC	ESPN2	**MIA** 24–19	45,000	
October 28	12:20 p.m.	**Louisville**	**Wake Forest**	BB&T Field • Winston-Salem, NC	ACC Network	**WAKE** 42–32	29,593	
October 28	12:30 p.m.	**Virginia**	**Pittsburgh**	Heinz Field • Pittsburgh, PA	RSN	**PITT** 31–14	30,889	
October 28	3:30 p.m.	No. 14 **NC State**	No. 9 Notre Dame	Notre Dame Stadium • South Bend, IN	NBC	**L** **ND** 35–14	77,622	
October 28	7:20 p.m.	**Duke**	No. 13 **Virginia Tech**	Lane Stadium • Blacksburg, VA	ACC Network	**VT** 24–3	60,914	
October 28	8:00 p.m.	**Georgia Tech**	No. 7 **Clemson**	Memorial Stadium • Clemson, SC (Rivalry)	ABC	**CLEM** 24–10	80,346	
^{#}Rankings from AP Poll released prior to game. All times are in Eastern Time.

==== Week 10 ====
Date	Time	Visiting team	Home team	Site	TV	Result	Attendance	Ref.
November 4	12:20 p.m.	**Syracuse**	**Florida State**	Doak Campbell Stadium • Tallahassee, FL	ACC Network	**FSU** 27–24	71,805	
November 4	3:00 p.m.	**Georgia Tech**	**Virginia**	Scott Stadium • Charlottesville, VA	RSN	**UVA** 40–36	38,448	
November 4	3:30 p.m.	No. 6 **Clemson**	No. 20 **NC State**†	Carter-Finley Stadium • Raleigh, NC (Textile Bowl)	ABC	**CLEM** 38–31	57,600	
November 4	3:30 p.m.	**Wake Forest**	No. 5 Notre Dame	Notre Dame Stadium • Notre Dame, IN	NBC	**L** 48–37	77,622	
November 4	8:00 p.m.	No. 13 **Virginia Tech**	No. 9 **Miami**	Hard Rock Stadium • Miami Gardens, FL (Rivalry)	ABC	**MIA** 28–10	63,932	
^{#}Rankings from AP Poll released prior to game. All times are in Eastern Time.

==== Week 11 ====
Date	Time	Visiting team	Home team	Site	TV	Result	Attendance	Ref.
November 9	7:30 p.m.	**North Carolina**	**Pittsburgh**	Heinz Field • Pittsburgh, PA	ESPN	**UNC** 34–31	34,056	
November 11	12:00 p.m.	**Duke**	Army	Michie Stadium • West Point, NY	CBSSN	**L** 16–21	38,851	
November 11	12:00 p.m.	**NC State**	**Boston College**	Alumni Stadium • Chestnut Hill, MA	ABC/ESPN2	**NCST** 17–14	33,242	
November 11	12:20 p.m.	No. 17 **Virginia Tech**	**Georgia Tech**	Bobby Dodd Stadium • Atlanta, GA (Rivalry)	ACCN	**GT** 28–22	47,909	
November 11	3:00 p.m.	**Wake Forest**	**Syracuse**	Carrier Dome • Syracuse, NY	RSN	**WAKE** 64–43	38,539	
November 11	3:30 p.m.	**Florida State**	No. 4 **Clemson**	Memorial Stadium • Clemson, SC (Rivalry)	ESPN	**CLEM** 31–14	81,436	
November 11	3:30 p.m.	**Virginia**	**Louisville**	Papa John's Cardinal Stadium • Louisville, KY	ESPNU	**LOU** 38–21	46,787	
November 11	8:00 p.m.	No. 3 Notre Dame	No. 7 **Miami**	Hard Rock Stadium • Miami Gardens, FL (Rivalry)	ABC	**W** 41–8	65,303	
^{#}Rankings from AP Poll released prior to game. All times are in Eastern Time.

==== Week 12 ====
Date	Time	Visiting team	Home team	Site	TV	Result	Attendance	Ref.
November 18	12:00 p.m.	Delaware State	**Florida State**†	Doak Campbell Stadium • Tallahassee, FL	RSN	**W** 77–6	70,599	
November 18	12:00 p.m.	**Virginia**	**Miami**	Hard Rock Stadium • Miami Gardens, FL	ABC or ESPN	**MIA** 44–28	63,415	
November 18	12:20 p.m.	The Citadel	**Clemson**	Memorial Stadium • Clemson, SC	ACCN	**W** 61–3	80,618	
November 18	12:20 p.m.	**Pittsburgh**	**Virginia Tech**	Lane Stadium • Blacksburg, VA	ACCN	**VT** 20–14	58,948	
November 18	3:00 p.m.	Western Carolina	**North Carolina**	Kenan Memorial Stadium • Chapel Hill, NC	ACCN Extra	**W** 65–10	43,000	
November 18	3:30 p.m.	**Georgia Tech**	**Duke**	Wallace Wade Stadium • Durham, NC	RSN	**DUKE** 43–20	20,141	
November 18	3:00 p.m.	**Syracuse**	**Louisville**	Papa John's Cardinal Stadium • Louisville, KY	ESPNU	**LOU** 56–10	34,265	
November 18	7:00 p.m.	**Boston College**	Connecticut	Fenway Park • Boston, MA	CBSSN	**W** 39–16	20,133	
November 18	7:30 p.m.	**NC State**	**Wake Forest**	BB&T Field • Winston-Salem, NC	ESPNU	**WAKE** 30–24	31,803	
^{#}Rankings from AP Poll released prior to game. All times are in Eastern Time.

==== Week 13 ====
Date	Time	Visiting team	Home team	Site	TV	Result	Attendance	Ref.
November 24	12:00 p.m.	No. 2 **Miami**	**Pittsburgh**	Heinz Field • Pittsburgh, PA	ABC	**PITT** 24–14	35,978	
November 24	8:00 p.m.	No. 24 **Virginia Tech**	**Virginia**	Scott Stadium • Charlottesville, VA (Commonwealth Cup)	ESPN	**VT** 10–0	48,609	
November 25	12:00 p.m.	**Florida State**	Florida	Ben Hill Griffin Stadium • Gainesville, FL (Rivalry)	ESPN	**W** 38–22	89,066	
November 25	12:00 p.m.	**Louisville**	Kentucky	Kroger Field • Lexington, KY (Rivalry)	SEC Network	**W** 44–17	56,186	
November 25	12:20 p.m.	**Boston College**	**Syracuse**	Carrier Dome • Syracuse, NY (Rivalry)	ACCN	**BC** 42–14	30,202	
November 25	12:30 p.m.	**Duke**	**Wake Forest**	BB&T Field • Winston-Salem, NC	RSN	**DUKE** 31–23	27,016	
November 25	3:30 p.m.	**North Carolina**	**NC State**	Carter–Finley Stadium • Raleigh, NC (Rivalry)	ESPNU	**NCST** 33–21	57,600	
November 25	7:30 p.m.	No. 4 **Clemson**	South Carolina	Williams-Brice Stadium • Columbia, SC (Palmetto Bowl)	ESPN	**W** 34–10	82,908	
November 25	12:00 p.m.	No. 7 Georgia	**Georgia Tech**	Bobby Dodd Stadium • Atlanta, GA (Rivalry)	ABC	**L** 7–38	55,000	
^{#}Rankings from AP Poll released prior to game. All times are in Eastern Time.

=== Championship game ===
==== Week 14 (2017 ACC Championship Game) ====
Date	Time	Visiting team	Home team	Site	Broadcast	Result	Attendance	Reference
December 2	8:00 p.m.	#7 **Miami**	#1 **Clemson**	Bank of America Stadium • Charlotte, NC	ABC	**CLEM** 38–3	74,372	

== ACC vs other conferences ==
=== ACC vs Power 5 matchups ===
This is a list of the power conference teams (Big 10, Big 12, Pac-12, Notre Dame and SEC). Although the NCAA does not consider BYU a "Power Five" school, the ACC considers games against BYU as satisfying its "Power Five" scheduling requirement. The ACC plays in the non-conference games. All rankings are from the current AP Poll at the time of the game.

Date	Visitor	Home	Site	Significance	Score
September 2	NC State	South Carolina	Bank of America Stadium • Charlotte, NC	Belk Kickoff Game	L 28–35
September 2	California	North Carolina	Kenan Memorial Stadium • Chapel Hill, NC		L 30–35
September 2	#1 Alabama	#3 Florida State	Mercedes Benz Stadium • Atlanta, GA	Chick-fil-A Kickoff Game	L 7–24
September 2	Purdue	#16 Louisville	Lucas Oil Stadium • Indianapolis, IN		W 35–28
September 3	#22 West Virginia	#21 Virginia Tech	FedEx Field • Landover, MD	Virginia Tech–West Virginia football rivalry	W 31–24
September 4	#25 Tennessee	Georgia Tech	Mercedes Benz Stadium • Atlanta, GA	Chick-fil-A Kickoff Game	L 41–42 (2OT)
September 9	Indiana	Virginia	Scott Stadium • Charlottesville, VA		L 17–34
September 9	Pittsburgh	#4 Penn State	Beaver Stadium • University Park, PA	Penn State–Pittsburgh football rivalry	L 14–33
September 9	#13 Auburn	#3 Clemson	Memorial Stadium • Clemson, SC	Auburn–Clemson football rivalry	W 14–6
September 16	Notre Dame	Boston College	Alumni Stadium • Chestnut Hill, MA		L 20–49
September 16	#9 Oklahoma State	Pittsburgh	Heinz Field • Pittsburgh, PA		L 21–59
September 16	Baylor	Duke	Wallace Wade Stadium • Durham, NC		W 34–20
September 23	Syracuse	LSU	Tiger Stadium • Baton Rouge, LA		L 26–35
October 7	#21 Notre Dame	North Carolina	Kenan Memorial Stadium • Chapel Hill, NC		L 10–30
October 28	# 14 North Carolina State	#9 Notre Dame	Notre Dame Stadium • South Bend, IN		L 14–35
November 4	Wake Forest	#5 Notre Dame	Notre Dame Stadium • South Bend, IN		L 37–48
November 11	#3 Notre Dame	#7 Miami	Hard Rock Stadium • Miami Gardens, FL	Catholics vs. Convicts rivalry	W 41–8
November 25	#7 Georgia	Georgia Tech	Bobby Dodd Stadium • Atlanta, GA	Clean, Old-Fashioned Hate	L 7–38
November 25	Louisville	Kentucky	Commonwealth Stadium • Lexington, KY	Governor's Cup	W 44–17
November 25	#4 Clemson	South Carolina	Williams-Brice Stadium • Columbia, SC	Battle of the Palmetto State	W 34–10
November 25	Florida State	Florida	Ben Hill Griffin Stadium • Gainesville, FL	Florida–Florida State football rivalry	W 38–22

=== Records against other conferences ===
2017 records against non-conference foes (as of January 2, 2018):

Regular Season

Power 5 Conferences	Record
Big Ten	1–2
Big 12	2–1
Notre Dame	1–4
Pac-12	0–1
SEC	4–5
Power 5 Total	8–13
Other FBS Conferences	Record
American	3–0
C-USA	3–1
MAC	6–0
Mountain West	2–0
Independents (Excluding Notre Dame)	0–1
Sun Belt	2–0
Other FBS Total	16–2
FCS Opponents	Record
Football Championship Subdivision	11–0
Total Non-Conference Record	35–15

Post Season

Power Conferences 5	Record
Big Ten	0–2
Big 12	0–1
Notre Dame	0–0
Pac-12	1–0
SEC	1–2
Power 5 Total	2–5
Other FBS Conferences	Record
American	0–1
C–USA	1–0
MAC	1–0
Other FBS Total	2–1
Total Bowl Record	4–6

== Postseason ==
=== Bowl games ===
Legend
ACC win
ACC loss

Bowl game	Date	Site	Television	Time (EST)	ACC team	Opponent	Score	Attendance
2017 Quick Lane Bowl	December 26	Ford Field • Detroit, MI	ESPN	5:15 p.m.	Duke	Northern Illinois	**W** 36–14	20,211
2017 Independence Bowl	December 27	Independence Stadium • Shreveport, LA	ESPN	1:30 p.m.	Florida State	Southern Miss	**W** 42–13	33,601
2017 Pinstripe Bowl	December 27	Yankee Stadium • New York, NY	ESPN	5:15 p.m.	Boston College	Iowa	**L** 20–27	37,667
2017 Military Bowl	December 28	Navy–Marine Corps Memorial Stadium • Annapolis, MD	ESPN	1:30 p.m.	Virginia	Navy	**L** 7–49	35,921
2017 Camping World Bowl	December 28	Camping World Stadium • Orlando, FL	ESPN	5:15 p.m.	#22 Virginia Tech	#19 Oklahoma State	**L** 21–30	39,610
2017 Belk Bowl	December 29	Bank of America Stadium • Charlotte, NC	ESPN	1:00 p.m.	Wake Forest	Texas A&M	**W** 55-52	32,784
2017 Sun Bowl	December 29	Sun Bowl • El Paso, TX	CBS	3:00 p.m.	#24 NC State	Arizona State	**W** 52-31	39,897
2017 TaxSlayer Bowl	December 30	EverBank Field • Jacksonville, FL	ESPN	12:00 p.m.	Louisville	#23 Mississippi	**L** 27–31	41,310
**New Year's Six Bowls**
2017 Orange Bowl	December 30	Hard Rock Stadium • Miami Gardens, FL	ESPN	8:00 p.m.	#10 Miami	#6 Wisconsin	**L** 24–34	65,326
Sugar Bowl (Semifinal)	January 1	Mercedes-Benz Superdome • New Orleans, LA	ESPN	8:45 p.m.	#1 Clemson	#4 Alabama	**L** 6–24	72,360

Rankings are from CFP rankings. All times Eastern Time Zone. ACC teams shown in bold.

== Awards and honors ==
=== Player of the week honors ===
Week	Offensive Back			Offensive Line			Receiver			Defensive Line			Linebacker			Defensive Back			Specialist			Rookie		
Week	Player	Team	Position	Player	Team	Position	Player	Team	Position	Player	Team	Position	Player	Team	Position	Player	Team	Position	Player	Team	Position	Player	Team	Position
Week 1 (Sept. 1)	TaQuon Marshall	Georgia Tech	QB	Tony Adams	NC State	G	Cam Phillips	Virginia Tech	WR	Josh Sweat	Florida State	DE	Andrew Motuapuaka	Virginia Tech	LB	Derwin James	Florida State	S	Colton Lichtenberg	Boston College	PK	Josh Jackson	Virginia Tech	QB
Week 2 (Sept. 9)	Lamar Jackson	Louisville	QB	Evan Lisle	Duke	OT	Jaylen Smith	Louisville	WR	Austin Bryant	Clemson	DE	Dorian O'Daniel	Clemson	LB	Essang Bassey	Wake Forest	CB	Anthony Ratliff-Williams	North Carolina	KR	Chazz Surratt	North Carolina	QB
Week 3 (Sept. 16)	Kelly Bryant	Clemson	QB	Taylor Hearn	Clemson	OG	Cam Phillips	Virginia Tech	WR	Mike Ramsay	Duke	DT	Micah Kiser	Virginia	ILB	Cameron Glenn	Wake Forest	FS	Will Spiers	Clemson	P	Josh Jackson	Virginia Tech	QB
Week 4 (Sept. 22)	Kurt Benkert	Virginia	QB	Parker Braun	Georgia Tech	OG	Andrew Levrone	Virginia	WR	Bradley Chubb	NC State	DE	Parris Bennett	Syracuse	WLB	Byron Fields Jr.	Duke	CB	Quadree Henderson	Pittsburgh	KR	Travis Etienne	Clemson	RB
Week 5 (Sept. 29)	Max Browne	Pittsburgh	QB	Kenny Cooper	Georgia Tech	C	Ervin Philips	Syracuse	WR	Bradley Chubb	NC State	DE	Dorian O'Daniel	Clemson	LB	A.J. Gray	Georgia Tech	S	Ricky Aguayo	Florida State	PK	Greg Dortch	Wake Forest	WR
Week 6 (Oct. 6)	Ryan Finley	NC State	QB	Will Richardson	NC State	OT	Braxton Berrios	Miami	WR	Zach Allen	Boston College	DE	Joe Giles-Harris	Duke	LB	Quin Blanding	Virginia	FS	Alex Kessman	Pittsburgh	PK	Sean Savoy	Virginia Tech	WR
Week 7 (Oct. 13)	A. J. Dillon & Eric Dungey	Boston College & Syracuse	RB; QB	Chris Lindstrom	Boston College	RT	Ervin Philips & Darrell Langham	Syracuse & Miami	WR	Clelin Ferrell	Clemson	DE	Parris Bennett	Syracuse	WLB	Quin Blanding	Virginia	FS	Michael Badgley	Miami	PK	A. J. Dillon	Boston College	RB
Week 8 (Oct. 20)	Darrin Hall	Pittsburgh	RB	Shamire Devine	Georgia Tech	OG	Christopher Herndon IV	Miami	TE	Ricky Walker	Virginia Tech	DT	Michael Pinckney	Miami	MLB	Jordan Whitehead & Reggie Floyd	Pittsburgh & Virginia Tech	SS; S	Greg Stroman	Virginia Tech	KR	Anthony Brown	Boston College	QB
Week 9 (Oct. 27)	John Wolford	Wake Forest	QB	Mitch Hyatt	Clemson	OT	Greg Dortch	Wake Forest	WR	R. J. McIntosh	Miami	DT	Ty Schwab	Boston College	WLB	Terrell Edumnds	Virginia Tech	S	Quadree Henderson	Pittsburgh	KR	Greg Dortch	Wake Forest	WR
Week 10 (Nov. 4)	Cam Akers	Florida State	RB	Mitch Hyatt	Clemson	OT	Steve Ishmael	Syracuse	WR	Clelin Ferrell	Clemson	DE	Micah Kiser	Virginia	ILB	Jaquan Johnson	Miami	S	Joe Reed	Virginia	KR	Cam Akers	Florida State	RB
Week 11 (Nov. 9)	John Wolford	Wake Forest	QB	Navaugh Donaldson	Miami	RG	Cam Serigne	Wake Forest	TE	Bradley Chubb	NC State	DE	Brant Mitchell & Zach McCloud	Georgia Tech & Miami	LB	Jaquan Johnson	Miami	S	Anthony Ratliff-Williams	North Carolina	WR	Travis Etienne	Clemson	RB
Week 12 (Nov. 18)	Lamar Jackson	Louisville	QB	Ryan Anderson	Wake Forest	C	Tabari Hines	Wake Forest	WR	Trent Harris & Joshua Kaindoh	Miami & Florida State	DE	Demetrius Kemp	Wake Forest	LB	Jaquan Johnson	Miami	S	Ryan Winslow	Pittsburgh	P	A. J. Dillon	Boston College	RB
Week 13 (Nov. 24)	Lamar Jackson	Louisville	QB	Garrett Bradbury & Mitch Hyatt	NC State & Clemson	C & LT	Steve Ishmael	Syracuse	WR	Brian Burns	Florida State	DE	Tremaine Edmunds	Virginia Tech	LB	Will Harris & Avonte Maddox	Boston College & Pittsburgh	S & CB	Dom Maggio	Wake Forest	P	Kenny Pickett	Pittsburgh	QB

=== All-conference teams ===
First Team

Position	Player	Class	Team
First Team Offense
QB	Lamar Jackson	Jr.	Louisville
RB	A. J. Dillon	Fr.	Boston College
RB	Nyheim Hines	Jr.	NC State
WR	Steve Ishmael	Sr.	Syracuse
WR	Cam Phillips	Sr.	Virginia Tech
WR	Jaylen Smith	Jr.	Louisville
TE	Cam Serigne	Sr.	Wake Forest
T	Mitch Hyatt	Jr.	Clemson
T	Brian O'Neill	Jr.	Pittsburgh
G	Tyrone Crowder	Sr.	Clemson
G	Wyatt Teller	Sr.	Virginia Tech
C	Justin Falcinelli	Jr.	Clemson
All Purpose Back	Jaylen Samuels	Sr.	NC State
First Team Defense
DE	Bradley Chubb	Sr.	NC State
DE	Clelin Ferrell	So.	Clemson
DT	Christian Wilkins	Jr.	Clemson
DT	Dexter Lawrence	So.	Clemson
LB	Micah Kiser	Sr.	Virginia
LB	Tremaine Edmunds	Jr	Virginia Tech
LB	Joe Giles-Harris	So.	Duke
CB	Mark Gilbert	So.	Duke
CB	Greg Stroman	Sr.	Virginia Tech
S	Quin Blanding	Sr.	Virginia
S	Derwin James	So.	Florida State
First Team Special Teams
PK	Michael Badgley	Sr.	Miami
P	Ryan Winslow	Sr.	Pittsburgh
SP	Anthony Ratliff-Williams	So.	North Carolina

Second Team

Position	Player	Class	Team
Second Team Offense
QB	John Wolford	Sr.	Wake Forest
RB	KirVonte Benson	So.	Georgia Tech
RB	Travis Homer	So.	Miami
WR	Kelvin Harmon	So.	NC State
WR	Olamide Zaccheaus	Jr.	Virginia
WR	Ervin Philips	Sr.	Syracuse
TE	Christopher Herndon IV	Sr.	Miami
T	Will Richardson	Jr.	NC State
T	Chris Lindstrom	Jr.	Boston College
G	Tony Adams	Sr.	NC State
G	Parker Braun	So.	Georgia Tech
C	Alec Eberle	Jr.	Florida State
All Purpose Back	Greg Dortch	Fr.	Wake Forest
Second Team Defense
DE	Austin Bryant	Jr.	Clemson
DE	Duke Ejiofor	Sr.	Wake Forest
DT	Tim Settle	So.	Virginia Tech
DT	R. J. McIntosh	Jr.	Miami
LB	Dorian O'Daniel	Sr.	Clemson
LB	Shaquille Quarterman	So.	Miami
LB	Parris Bennett	Sr.	Syracuse
CB	Michael Jackson	Jr.	Miami
CB	Tarvarus McFadden	Jr.	Florida State
S	Jaquan Johnson	Jr.	Miami
S	Lukas Denis	Jr.	Boston College
Second Team Special Teams
PK	Mike Weaver	Sr.	Wake Forest
P	Lester Coleman	Jr.	Virginia
SP	Quadree Henderson	Jr.	Pittsburgh

Third Team

Position	Player	Class	Team
Third Team Offense
QB	Ryan Finley	Jr.	NC State
RB	Travis Etienne	Fr.	Clemson
RB	Cam Akers	Fr.	Florida State
WR	Braxton Berrios	Sr.	Miami
WR	Hunter Renfrow	Jr.	Clemson
WR	Deon Cain	Jr.	Clemson
TE	Tommy Sweeney	Jr.	Boston College
T	K. C. McDermott	Sr.	Miami
T	Justin Herron	Jr.	Wake Forest
G	Taylor Hearn	Jr.	Clemson
G	Phil Haynes	Jr.	Wake Forest
C	Austin Davis	Sr.	Duke
All Purpose Back	Anthony Ratliff-Williams	So.	North Carolina
Third Team Defense
DE	Harold Landry	Sr.	Boston College
DE	Trent Harris	Sr.	Miami
DT	Derrick Nnadi	Sr.	Florida State
DT	Mike Ramsay	Sr.	Duke
LB	Kendall Joseph	Jr.	Clemson
LB	Ty Schwab	Sr.	Boston College
LB	Andrew Motuapuaka	Sr.	Virginia Tech
CB	Avonte Maddox	Sr.	Pittsburgh
CB	Juan Thornhill	Jr.	Virginia
S	Terrell Edmunds	Jr.	Virginia Tech
S	Jeremy McDuffie	Jr.	Duke
Third Team Special Teams
PK	Cole Murphy	Sr.	Syracuse
P	Pressley Harvin III	Fr.	Georgia Tech
SP	Nyheim Hines	Jr.	NC State
SP	Michael Walker	Jr.	Boston College

=== ACC Individual Awards ===
ACC Player of the Year

Lamar Jackson, Louisville

ACC Rookie of the Year

A. J. Dillon, Boston College

ACC Coach of the Year

Mark Richt, Miami

ACC Offensive Player of the Year

Lamar Jackson, Louisville

ACC Offensive Rookie of the Year

A. J. Dillon, Boston College

Jacobs Blocking Trophy

Mitch Hyatt, Clemson

ACC Defensive Player of the Year

Bradley Chubb, NC State

ACC Defensive Rookie of the Year

Brenton Nelson, Virginia

==== All-Americans ====
===== Consensus =====
Unanimous selection: Bradley Chubb - NC State

===== Associated Press =====
- AP First Team:

Bradley Chubb - NC State, Clelin Ferrell - Clemson,

- AP Second Team:

Lamar Jackson - Louisville, Mitch Hyatt - Clemson, Christian Wilkins - Clemson, Dorian O'Daniel - Clemson, Derwin James - Florida State,

- AP Third Team:

Tyrone Crowder - Clemson, Jaylen Samuels - NC State, Steve Ishmael - Syracuse, Austin Bryant - Clemson, Micah Kiser - Virginia, Tremaine Edmunds - Virginia Tech, Quin Blanding - Virginia,

===== Walter Camp =====
- Walter Camp First Team:

Bradley Chubb - NC State

- Walter Camp Second Team:

Steve Ishmael - Syracuse, Mitch Hyatt - Clemson, Lamar Jackson - Louisville, Austin Bryant - Clemson, Christian Wilkins - Clemson, Micah Kiser - Virginia, Joe Giles-Harris - Duke, Derwin James - Florida State, Quin Blanding - Virginia, Lukas Denis - Boston College

===== FWAA =====
- FWAA First Team:

Bradley Chubb - NC State, Austin Bryant - Clemson, Derwin James - Florida State,

- FWAA Second Team:

Lamar Jackson - Louisville, Steve Ishmael - Syracuse, Mitch Hyatt - Clemson, Clelin Ferrell - Clemson, Micah Kiser - Virginia, Quin Blanding - Virginia,

==== National Award Winners ====
- Bronko Nagurski Trophy – Bradley Chubb - Defensive End, NC State
- Broyles Award - Tony Elliott - Co-Offensive Coordinator, Clemson
- Walter Camp Coach of the Year Award - Mark Richt - Head Coach, Miami
- Campbell Trophy - Micah Kiser - Linebacker, Virginia

== Home game attendance ==
Team	Stadium	Capacity	Game 1	Game 2	Game 3	Game 4	Game 5	Game 6	Game 7	Total	Average	% of Capacity
Boston College	Alumni Stadium	44,500	38,082	44,500†	27,036	32,057	40,629	33,242		215,546	35,924	80.73%
Clemson	Memorial Stadium	81,500	80,121	**81,799**†	80,525	80,567	80,346	81,436	80,618	565,412	80,773	99.11%
Duke	Wallace Wade Stadium	40,000	30,477	20,241	26,714	36,314†	31,073	22,621	20,141	187,518	26,797	66.99%
Florida State	Doak Campbell Stadium	79,560	73,541	78,169†	72,764	71,805	70,599	58,780		425,658	70,943	89.17%
Georgia Tech	Bobby Dodd Stadium	55,000	50,161	40,211	42,805	45,224	47,909	55,000†		281,310	46,885	85.25%
Louisville	Papa John's Cardinal Stadium	55,000	**55,588**†	47,812	47,826	44,679	46,787	34,265		276,957	46,160	84.75%
Miami	Hard Rock Stadium	65,326	50,454	49,361	55,799	56,158	63,932	65,326†	63,415	404,444	57,778	88.45%
North Carolina	Kenan Memorial Stadium	63,000	49,500	47,000	59,000†	57,000	50,000	45,000	43,000	350,500	50,071	76.65%
NC State	Carter–Finley Stadium	57,583	57,430	56,166	56,197	56,107	**57,600**†	**57,600**†		341,100	56,850	98.73%
Pittsburgh	Heinz Field	68,400	40,012	38,952	33,051	41,124†	30,889	34,056	35,978	254,062	36,295	53.06%
Syracuse	Carrier Dome	49,262	30,273	29,731	33,004	33,290	42,475†	38,539	30,202	237,514	33,931	68.88%
Virginia	Scott Stadium	61,500	38,828	38,993	33,056	38,638	39,216	38,448	48,609†	275,788	39,398	64.06%
Virginia Tech	Lane Stadium	66,233	62,526	65,632†	65,632†	65,632†	60,914	58,948		379,284	63,214	96.77%
Wake Forest	BB&T Field	31,500	22,643	27,971	**31,588**†	29,593	31,803	27,016		170,614	28,436	90.27%

Bold – Exceeded capacity
†Season High

== NFL draft ==
There were a total of 45 athletes from the Atlantic Coast Conference selected in the 2018 NFL Draft. This was the second most from a single conference in the draft, and the third most from the ACC all–time. Georgia Tech was the only member university to not have a player drafted.

Round #	Pick #	NFL team	Player	Position	College
1	5	Denver Broncos	Bradley Chubb	Defensive end	NC State
1	16	Buffalo Bills ^{(from Baltimore)}	Tremaine Edmunds	Linebacker	Virginia Tech
1	17	Los Angeles Chargers	Derwin James	Safety	Florida State
1	18	Green Bay Packers ^{(from Seattle)}	Jaire Alexander	Cornerback	Louisville
1	28	Pittsburgh Steelers	Terrell Edmunds	Safety	Virginia Tech
1	32	Baltimore Ravens ^{(from Philadelphia)}	Lamar Jackson	Quarterback	Louisville
2	41	Tennessee Titans ^{(from Oakland)}	Harold Landry	Linebacker	Boston College
2	54	Cincinnati Bengals ^{(from Kansas City)}	Jessie Bates	Safety	Wake Forest
2	62	Minnesota Vikings	Brian O'Neill	Tackle	Pittsburgh
3	67	Indianapolis Colts	Chad Thomas	Defensive end	Miami
3	69	New York Giants^{(from Tampa Bay)}	B.J. Hill	Defensive tackle	NC State
3	74	Washington Redskins^{(from San Francisco)}	Geron Christian	Offensive tackle	Louisville
3	75	Kansas City Chiefs^{(from Baltimore through Oakland)}	Derrick Nnadi	Defensive tackle	Florida State
3	84	Los Angeles Chargers	Justin Jones	Defensive tackle	NC State
3	99	Denver Broncos	Isaac Yiadom	Cornerback	Boston College
3	100	Kansas City Chiefs^{(from Cincinnati)}	Dorian O'Daniel	Linebacker	Clemson
4	104	Indianapolis Colts	Nyheim Hines	Running back	NC State
4	107	New York Jets	Chris Herndon	Tight end	Miami
4	112	Cincinnati Bengals	Mark Walton	Running back	Miami
4	117	Tampa Bay Buccaneers^{(from Detroit via New England)}	Jordan Whitehead	Safety	Pittsburgh
4	125	Philadelphia Eagles^{(from Baltimore via Tennessee)}	Avonte Maddox	Cornerback	Pittsburgh
4	127	New Orleans Saints	Rick Leonard	Tackle	Florida State
4	128	San Francisco 49ers^{(from Pittsburgh)}	Kentavius Street	Defensive end	NC State
4	129	Jacksonville Jaguars	Will Richardson	Tackle	NC State
4	130	Philadelphia Eagles^{(from Minnesota)}	Josh Sweat	Defensive end	Florida State
5	139	New York Giants	R. J. McIntosh	Defensive tackle	Miami
5	147	Los Angeles Rams^{(from Miami via New Orleans and Green Bay)}	Micah Kiser	Linebacker	Virginia
5	158	Cincinnati Bengals^{(from Buffalo)}	Andrew Brown	Defensive end	Virginia
5	163	Washington Redskins^{(from Atlanta via Denver)}	Tim Settle	Defensive tackle	Virginia Tech
5	165	Pittsburgh Steelers	Jaylen Samuels	Fullback	NC State
5	166	Buffalo Bills^{(from Jacksonville)}	Wyatt Teller	Guard	Virginia Tech
6	177	Houston Texans	Duke Ejiofor	Defensive end	Wake Forest
6	185	Indianapolis Colts^{(from Oakland)}	Deon Cain	Wide receiver	Clemson
6	187	Buffalo Bills^{(from Cincinnati)}	Ray-Ray McCloud	Wide receiver	Clemson
6	189	New Orleans Saints^{(from Arizona)}	Kamrin Moore	Cornerback	Boston College
6	205	Los Angeles Rams^{(from New England via Cleveland and Washington)}	Trevon Young	Defensive end	Louisville
6	210	New England Patriots^{(from Oakland)}	Braxton Berrios	Wide receiver	Miami
7	234	Carolina Panthers^{(from LA Chargers via Buffalo)}	Andre Smith	Linebacker	North Carolina
7	235	Indianapolis Colts^{(from Seattle via NY Jets)}	Zaire Franklin	Linebacker	Syracuse
7	241	Washington Redskins^{(from LA Rams)}	Greg Stroman	Cornerback	Virginia Tech
7	242	Carolina Panthers	Kendrick Norton	Defensive tackle	Miami
7	250	New England Patriots^{(from Philadelphia via Seattle, New England, Seattle, and Philadelphia)}	Ryan Izzo	Tight end	Florida State
7	253	Cincinnati Bengals	Auden Tate	Wide receiver	Florida State
7	255	Buffalo Bills^{(from Tampa Bay)}	Austin Proehl	Wide receiver	North Carolina
