= Shamarko Thomas =

American gridiron football player (born 1991)

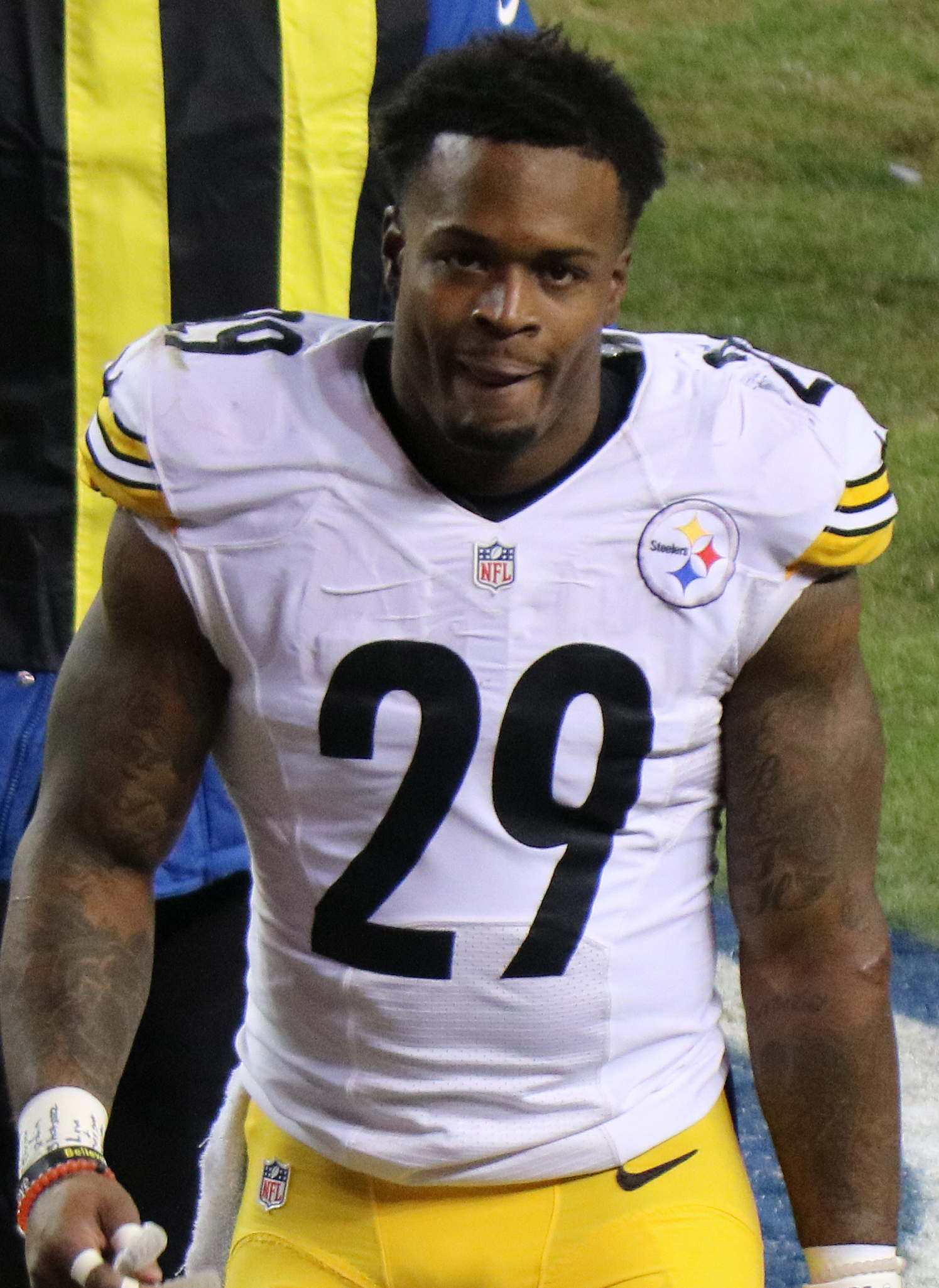
- Thomas with the Pittsburgh Steelers in 2015

No. 29, 38
- Position: Safety

Personal information
- Born: February 23, 1991 (age 35); Virginia Beach, Virginia, U.S.
- Listed height: 5 ft 9 in (1.75 m)
- Listed weight: 205 lb (93 kg)

Career information
- High school: Ocean Lakes (Virginia Beach)
- College: Syracuse
- NFL draft: 2013: 4th round, 111th overall pick

Career history
- Pittsburgh Steelers (2013–2016); New York Jets (2017)*; Buffalo Bills (2017); Indianapolis Colts (2018)*; Denver Broncos (2018); New York Guardians (2020)*; DC Defenders (2020); Ottawa Redblacks (2021)*
- * Offseason or practice squad member only

Awards and highlights
- First-team All-Big East (2012)

Career NFL statistics
- Total tackles: 69
- Forced fumbles: 1
- Fumble recoveries: 1
- Stats at Pro Football Reference

Shamarko Lanell Thomas (born February 23, 1991) is an American former professional football player who was a safety in the National Football League (NFL). He played college football for the Syracuse Orange, and was selected by the Pittsburgh Steelers in the fourth round of the 2013 NFL draft. Thomas was also a member of the New York Jets, Buffalo Bills, Indianapolis Colts, Denver Broncos, New York Guardians, DC Defenders, and the Ottawa Redblacks.

== Early life ==
Thomas was born in Virginia Beach, Virginia. He attended Ocean Lakes High School in Virginia Beach, and he played for the Ocean Lakes Dolphins high school football team. He was named 2008 first-team all-state, all-region and All-Tidewater, and was a two-time first-team all-district selection. He set school records in career tackles, interceptions and defensive touchdowns. In 2008, he recorded a team-high 102 tackles, six interceptions, 11 pass breakups, and one blocked field goal as a team captain, leading the squad to a 12–1 record, while earning 2008 team defensive MVP honors. He led the team in tackles as a junior.

Thomas was also a track star at Ocean Lakes High School. He earned all-state honors competing in the 100 meters, and as the anchor of the 4 × 100 meter relay that placed seventh in Virginia. At the 2009 Beach District Championships, he placed first in the 100 meters (10.76s) and third in the 200 meters (21.78s).

== College career ==
Thomas attended Syracuse University, where he was a member of the Syracuse Orange football team from 2009 to 2012. During his career, he started 43 of 48 games in which he played, recording 263 tackles, two interceptions and four quarterback sacks. As a senior in 2012, he was a first-team All-Big East Conference selection.

== Professional career ==
=== Pre-draft ===
Thomas was projected by many analysts to be a mid-round selection, likely going in the third or fourth rounds. Although he had good coverage skills and was thought to be really tough, many scouts thought his lack of height would be an issue when covering tight ends. He was invited to the NFL Combine and performed well, but during his 40 yard dash, he fell. He was unable to perform the three-cone drill due to a hamstring injury but did make it up at Syracuse's Pro Day. Thomas was comfortable enough with his combine performance that he chose not to do any exercises, besides three-cone drill, at his Pro Day. He was also rated fourth among 177 qualifying strong safeties by NFLDraftScout.com.

Pre-draft measurables
Height	Weight	40-yard dash	10-yard split	20-yard split	20-yard shuttle	Three-cone drill	Vertical jump	Broad jump	Bench press
5 ft 9 in (1.75 m)	213 lb (97 kg)	4.42 s	1.52 s	2.49 s	4.26 s	6.84 s	40.5 in (1.03 m)	11 ft 1 in (3.38 m)	28 reps
All values from NFL Combine

=== Pittsburgh Steelers ===
==== 2013 season ====
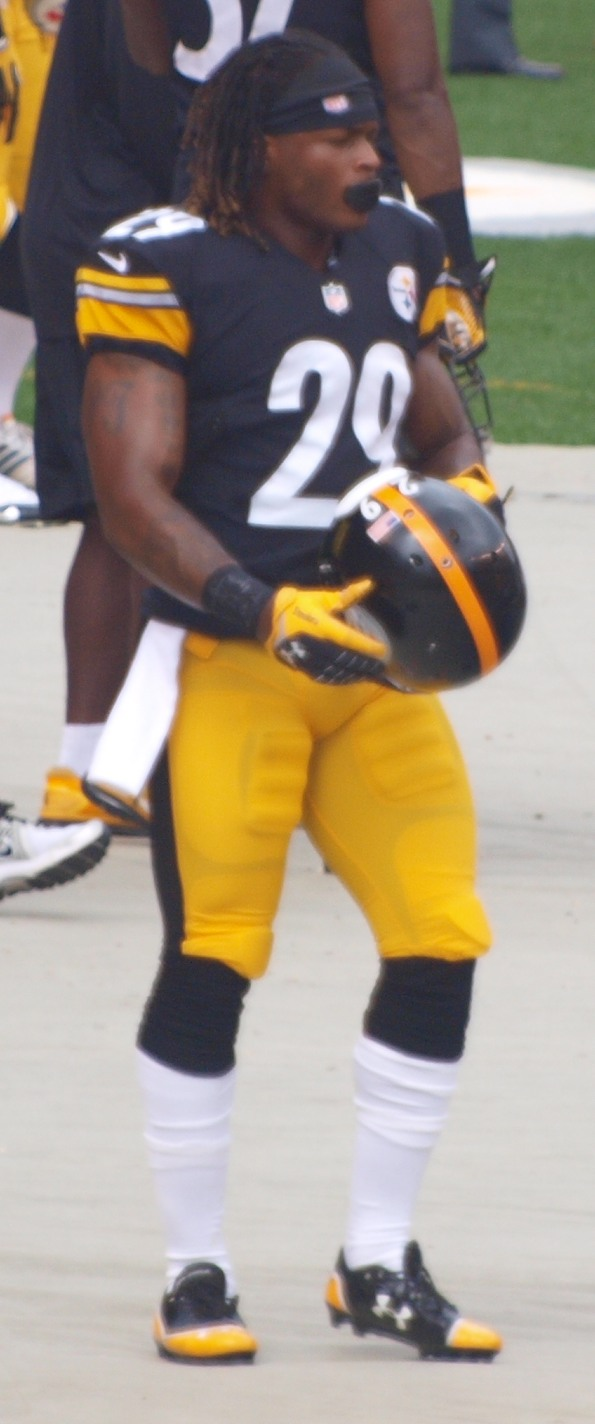
Thomas with the Steelers in 2013

The Pittsburgh Steelers selected Thomas in the fourth round (111th overall) of the 2013 NFL draft. The Steelers traded their third round pick in the 2014 NFL draft to the Cleveland Browns in order to acquire their fourth round pick (111th overall) in the draft to select Thomas.

On May 16, 2013, Thomas signed a four-year, $2.61 million contract that includes a signing bonus of $453,152.

He entered his rookie season as the third-string backup to Pro-bowl veteran Troy Polamalu and Damon Cromartie-Smith. He made his professional debut in the Steelers' season opener against the Tennessee Titans and finished with two tackles. On September 22, 2013, Thomas had his first career start and finished the loss with one tackle against the Chicago Bears. On November 3, 2013, he had his best game of the season after he made a season-high 8 total tackles during the Steelers' 31–55 loss to the New England Patriots. During a Week 10 matchup against the Buffalo Bills, he suffered an ankle injury that sidelined him for the next two games. Before the injury, Thomas had been able to earn the backup strong safety position and mainly played the primary safety in the defense's sub packages. Veteran Will Allen was signed by the Steelers to substitute for Thomas while he recovered from his injury and when he returned he was unable to win his former position from Allen.

He finished his rookie season with a total of 29 tackles in 14 games and two starts.

==== 2014 season ====
During the offseason, Thomas was invited by Troy Polamalu to train with him in California under Polamalu's trainer Marv Marinovich. He was the first player Polamalu ever invited. They used iso-kinetic training to focused on fast-twitch muscle fibers. He entered training camp battling Will Allen for the backup position behind Polamalu, and won the backup position after Allen was moved to the backup free safety position behind Mike Mitchell. In his second season with the Steelers, he was unable to receive prominent playing time and was mainly used as a gunner on special teams. During the 2014 season, Thomas played in 11 games, none as a starter, recording 5 solo tackles and his first career forced fumble at Carolina Panthers in Week 3.

==== 2015 season ====
On April 9, 2015, Polamalu announced his retirement from the NFL, and Thomas was assumed to be the heir apparent. After a rough preseason, it was determined that Thomas would be the backup behind Will Allen. Thomas played sparsely during the season, registering just 12 tackles in 15 games.

==== 2016 season ====
Thomas entered the offseason with an opportunity to regain the starting position after the Pittsburgh Steelers decided to overhaul their pass defense after ranking 28th in 2015. With former starting strong safety Will Allen gone, Thomas battled rookie Sean Davis and veteran Robert Golden for the starting strong safety position. He lost the job to Golden and was slated to be his backup to begin the regular season. He was placed on injured reserve on December 24, 2016.

=== New York Jets ===
On June 2, 2017, Thomas signed with the New York Jets. On September 2, 2017, he was released by the Jets.

=== Buffalo Bills ===
On October 3, 2017, Thomas was signed by the Buffalo Bills.

=== Indianapolis Colts ===
On July 26, 2018, Thomas signed with the Indianapolis Colts. Thomas was released by the Colts on August 11, 2018.

=== Denver Broncos ===
On August 13, 2018, Thomas signed with the Denver Broncos. He was released on September 1, 2018. He was re-signed on September 11, 2018. He was released on December 10, 2018. On January 2, 2019, Thomas was re-signed to reserve/future contract. He was released on August 31, 2019.

=== New York Guardians ===
Thomas was signed by the New York Guardians of the XFL in January 2020.

=== DC Defenders ===
Thomas was traded to the DC Defenders in a three-team trade on January 20, 2020. He had his contract terminated when the league suspended operations on April 10, 2020.

=== Ottawa Redblacks ===
Thomas signed with the Ottawa Redblacks of the CFL on April 19, 2021. He was placed on the suspended list on July 9, 2021.

== Personal life ==
While attending Syracuse University in 2010, Thomas lost his mother and father in a span of nine months. His mother, Ebeth Shabazz, died from a heart condition and his father died after being involved in a motorcycle accident. As the oldest child in his family, Thomas questioned whether or not to enter the 2012 NFL draft so he could have an income to help his siblings. He has four brothers and one sister.
