= Eli Harold =

American gridiron football player (born 1994)

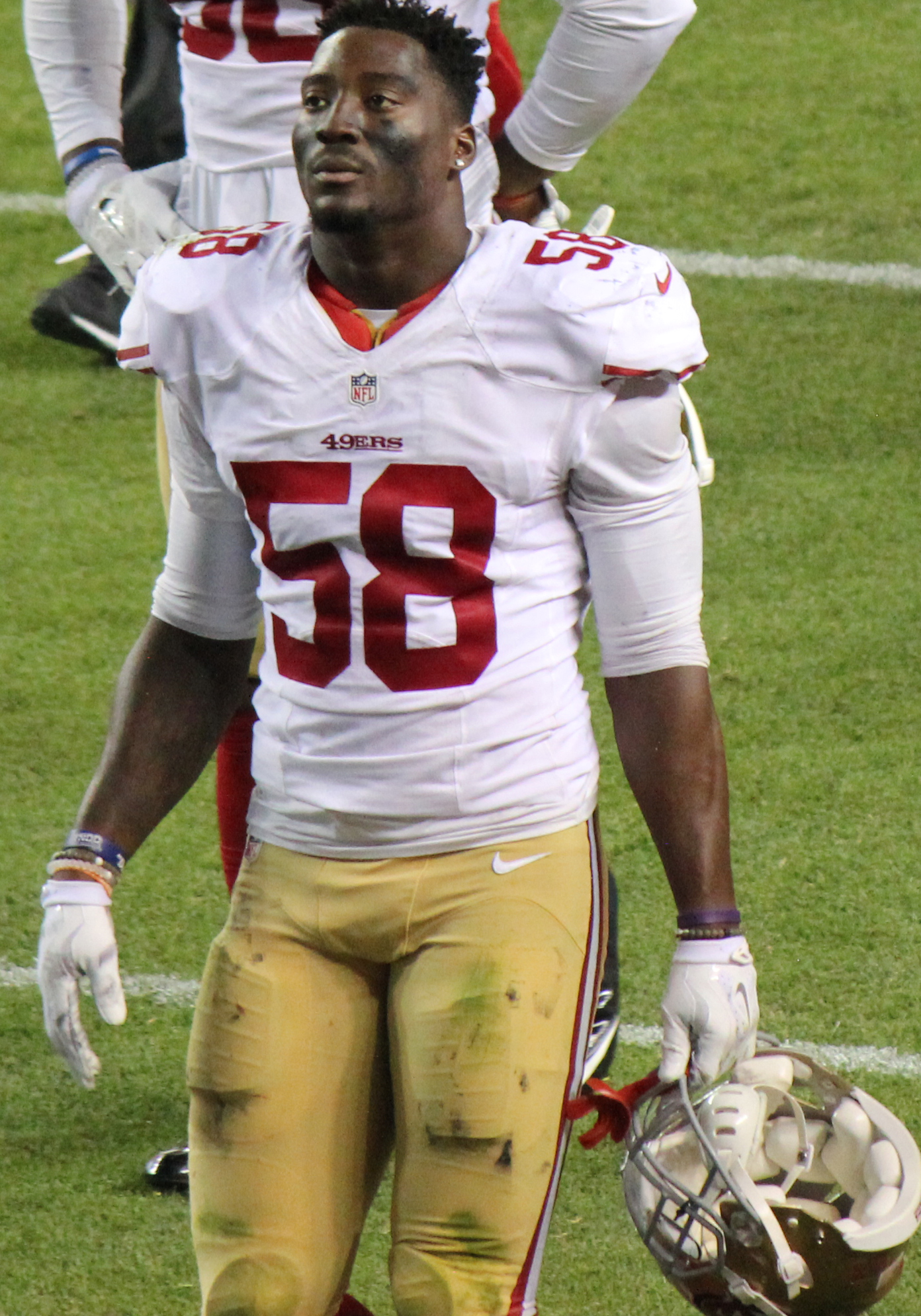
- Harold with the San Francisco 49ers in 2015

No. 58, 57
- Position: Defensive end

Personal information
- Born: January 20, 1994 (age 32); Virginia Beach, Virginia, U.S.
- Listed height: 6 ft 3 in (1.91 m)
- Listed weight: 243 lb (110 kg)

Career information
- High school: Ocean Lakes (Virginia Beach)
- College: Virginia (2012-2014)
- NFL draft: 2015: 3rd round, 79th overall pick

Career history
- San Francisco 49ers (2015–2017); Detroit Lions (2018); Buffalo Bills (2019)*; Philadelphia Eagles (2019)*; Toronto Argonauts (2021)
- * Offseason or practice squad member only

Awards and highlights
- Second-team All-ACC (2014)

Career NFL statistics
- Total tackles: 95
- Sacks: 9.0
- Forced fumbles: 1
- Fumble recoveries: 2
- Stats at Pro Football Reference
- Stats at CFL.ca

Medgar Elisha Harold (born January 20, 1994) is an American former professional football player who was a defensive end in the National Football League (NFL). He played college football for the Virginia Cavaliers.

== Early life ==
Harold attended Ocean Lakes High School in Virginia Beach, Virginia, where he was a two-sport star in both football and track. He played as a defensive end, quarterback, running back and wide receiver for the Ocean Lakes Dolphins football team. He was a SI.com honorable mention All-American. As a senior, he totalled 78 tackles and 16 sacks on defense and had 1,146 total yards and 20 touchdowns on wildcat offense. He led the Dolphins with 41 receptions for 723 yards. He was a first-team All-Tidewater pick. He was named the Beach District Defensive Player of the Year and a first-team All-district selection at wide receiver and defensive end. He also played in the 2012 U.S. Army All-American Bowl, where he served as a team captain for the East squad.

Also a standout track & field athlete, Harold was a state qualifier in the jumping events. At the 2009 Beach District Outdoor Track Championship, he placed 3rd in the triple jump event with a leap of 13.40 meters (43-10). He earned a second-place finish in the shot put at the 2012 Tallwood Team Challenge, recording a career-best throw of 14.01 meters (45-8). He also posted a personal-best leap of 6.68 meters (21-8.5) in the long jump at the 2012 District Meet, where he took first.

Regarded as a four-star recruit by both Rivals.com and ESPN, Harold was ranked as the No. 1 overall player in the state of Virginia, the No. 5 defensive end nationally and the No. 50 overall prospect by Rivals, and the No. 15 defensive end in the nation by ESPN. He also earned a scouts grade of 80 from ESPN. He was regarded as a five-star recruit by Scout.com, and was ranked the No. 1 outside linebacker prospect in the nation. In August 2011, Harold committed to the University of Virginia to play college football.

== College career ==
Harold played in all 12 games as a true freshman in 2012. He finished the year with 36 tackles two sacks and an interception. Harold took over as a starter in 2013. He finished the year with 51 tackles and 8.5 sacks. Harold returned as a starter his junior season in 2014. He finished the year with 54 tackles seven sacks and one interception.

Harold announced on December 10, 2014, that he would forgo his senior season and enter the 2015 NFL draft. He finished his career with 141 tackles 17.5 sacks and two interceptions.

== Professional career ==
Pre-draft measurables
Height	Weight	Arm length	Hand span	Wingspan	40-yard dash	10-yard split	20-yard split	20-yard shuttle	Three-cone drill	Vertical jump	Broad jump	Bench press
6 ft 3 1/8 in (1.91 m)	247 lb (112 kg)	33 in (0.84 m)	9 3/8 in (0.24 m)	6 ft 7 1/2 in (2.02 m)	4.60 s	1.61 s	2.69 s	4.16 s	7.07 s	35.0 in (0.89 m)	10 ft 3 in (3.12 m)	24 reps
All values from NFL Combine/Pro Day

=== San Francisco 49ers ===
On May 2, 2015, Harold was selected by the San Francisco 49ers in the third round with the 79th overall pick of the 2015 NFL draft. As a rookie in 2015, he played in 16 games making 13 tackles and 1 fumble recovery.

=== Detroit Lions ===
On August 23, 2018, Harold was traded from San Francisco to the Detroit Lions for a conditional 2020 draft pick. Conditions were met and the Lions' 2020 7th round pick transferred to the 49ers.

=== Buffalo Bills ===
On April 10, 2019, Harold signed a one-year deal with the Buffalo Bills.

=== Philadelphia Eagles ===
On August 9, 2019, Harold was traded to the Philadelphia Eagles for offensive lineman Ryan Bates. He was released during final roster cuts on August 30, 2019.

=== Toronto Argonauts ===
On December 10, 2020, it was announced that Harold had signed with the Toronto Argonauts of the Canadian Football League. He was released on October 18, 2021.

== NFL career statistics ==
Legend
**Bold**	Career high

Year	Team	Games		Tackles					Interceptions					Fumbles			
Year	Team	GP	GS	Cmb	Solo	Ast	Sck	TFL	Int	Yds	TD	Lng	PD	FF	FR	Yds	TD
2015	SFO	**16**	1	14	8	6	0.0	4	0	0	0	0	0	0	**1**	8	0
2016	SFO	**16**	**13**	**37**	23	**14**	3.0	3	0	0	0	0	0	**1**	**1**	**19**	0
2017	SFO	**16**	10	34	**26**	8	2.0	**5**	0	0	0	0	0	0	0	0	0
2018	DET	13	0	10	8	2	**4.0**	4	0	0	0	0	**1**	0	0	0	0
		61	24	95	65	30	9.0	16	0	0	0	0	1	1	2	27	0

== Personal life ==
Eli Harold was born in Virginia Beach, Virginia, in 1994. He identifies himself as a Christian and was raised in the Church of God in Christ as a Pentecostal during his childhood. His older brother, Walter Ray Harold, Jr., is a Pentecostal minister and pastor in Norfolk, VA. Harold's nephew, Forrest Ray Harold, son of his brother Walter Ray, Jr., died on November 13, 2010, at the age of 20. Harold's mother died from pancreatic cancer at the age of 56 on January 2, 2011. His other nephew, Walter Harold III, was a quarterback at Virginia State University. He is married to Kelsey Harold (née Pendleton). They have one daughter named Zuri and one son named Eli Jr.
