= R. J. McIntosh =

American football player (born 1996)

Profile
- Position: Defensive end

Personal information
- Born: June 2, 1996 (age 30); Fort Lauderdale, Florida, U.S.
- Listed height: 6 ft 4 in (1.93 m)
- Listed weight: 283 lb (128 kg)

Career information
- High school: Cardinal Gibbons (Fort Lauderdale, Florida)
- College: Miami (FL)
- NFL draft: 2018: 5th round, 139th overall pick

Career history
- New York Giants (2018–2020); New Orleans Saints (2021)*; Green Bay Packers (2021)*; Indianapolis Colts (2022)*; Miami Dolphins (2022)*; Saskatchewan Roughriders (2024)*
- * Offseason or practice squad member only

Awards and highlights
- Second-team All-ACC (2017)

Career NFL statistics
- Total tackles: 18
- Sacks: 2.0
- Stats at Pro Football Reference

R. J. McIntosh (born June 2, 1996) is an American professional football defensive end. He played college football at Miami (FL).

== College career ==
McIntosh played at the University of Miami from 2015 to 2017, recording 5.5 sacks. After his junior season in 2017, he decided to forgo his senior year to enter the 2018 NFL draft.

== Professional career ==
Pre-draft measurables
Height	Weight	Arm length	Hand span	Wingspan	40-yard dash	10-yard split	20-yard split	20-yard shuttle	Three-cone drill	Vertical jump	Broad jump
6 ft 4 1/2 in (1.94 m)	286 lb (130 kg)	33 7/8 in (0.86 m)	9 3/8 in (0.24 m)	6 ft 10 3/4 in (2.10 m)	5.12 s	1.80 s	2.93 s	5.09 s	7.78 s	27.0 in (0.69 m)	8 ft 3 in (2.51 m)
All values from NFL Combine/Pro Day

McIntosh was drafted by the New York Giants in the fifth round (139th overall) of the 2018 NFL draft. He was placed on the reserve/non-football illness (NFI) list on September 1, 2018, after being diagnosed with a thyroid condition at the NFL Combine. He was activated off NFI to the active roster on November 6, 2018. He was cut by the Giants on August 11, 2021.

On August 12, 2021, McIntosh was claimed off waivers by the New Orleans Saints. He was released on August 31, 2021.

On September 21, 2021, McIntosh signed with the practice squad of the Green Bay Packers.

On February 8, 2022, the Indianapolis Colts signed McIntosh to a one-year deal. He was waived on August 30, 2022.

On November 21, 2022, McIntosh was signed to the Miami Dolphins practice squad.

On March 12, 2024, Mcintosh signed with the Saskatchewan Roughriders of the Canadian Football League (CFL). He was released on June 1, 2024.

== Personal life ==
McIntosh is the brother of Deon McIntosh, who played running back for Notre Dame and Washington State. The brothers played each other on November 11, 2017. McIntosh is also the brother of running back Kenny McIntosh.
