= Mike Ballard =

American baseball player (born 1984)

- Pitcher
- Born: February 6, 1984 (age 41); Norfolk, Virginia, U.S.
- Batted: Right Threw: Left

CPBL debut
- March 27, 2013, for the Brother Elephants

Last CPBL appearance
- April 10, 2013, for the Brother Elephants

CPBL statistics
- Win–loss record: 1–1
- Earned run average: 5.79
- Strikeouts: 8
- Stats at Baseball Reference

Teams
- Brother Elephants (2013)

Michael Aaron Ballard (born February 6, 1984) is an American former professional baseball pitcher. He played in the Chinese Professional Baseball League (CPBL) for the Brother Elephants. He is a phantom ballplayer, having spent a day on the active roster of the Baltimore Orioles without making an appearance.

== Amateur career ==
Ballard went to Ocean Lakes High School, where he led the team to a second-place finish in the 2001 Virginia AAA State Tournament, setting a school record in ERA with a 0.69 ERA. He was drafted in the 50th round, 1474th overall, in the 2002 MLB Draft by the Minnesota Twins, but he decided to go to the University of Virginia. His 2003 season was cut short due to injury, where, in his seven starts, he had a 1.93 ERA in 7 starts. He missed all of 2004 due to injury. He was solid in 2005, where he went 8–3 with a 3.54 ERA over 15 starts. In 2005, he played collegiate summer baseball with the Orleans Cardinals of the Cape Cod Baseball League. Ballard was drafted again by the Minnesota Twins, in the 47th round, 1415th overall, of the 2005 Draft, but decided to stay for his senior year. His senior year was less impressive, with a 4.09 ERA, despite having a 9–3 record and two complete games.

== Professional career ==
=== Texas Rangers ===
Ballard was drafted in the 14th round, 418th overall, by the Texas Rangers in the 2006 Major League Baseball draft, and decided to sign. He started 2006 with the Low–A Spokane Indians, where he went 2–7 with a 5.68 ERA and 41 strikeouts across 63 1/3 innings pitched.

Ballard started 2007 with the Single–A Clinton LumberKings, where he went 9–4 with a 3.93 ERA and 59 strikeouts before earning a promotion to the High–A Bakersfield Blaze. He started 2008 with the Double–A Frisco RoughRiders, where he went 8–3 with a 4.02 ERA and 72 strikeouts before earning a promotion to Triple-A Oklahoma RedHawks. Ballard split the 2009 campaign between Frisco and the newly renamed Oklahoma City RedHawks. He spent all of 2010 with Oklahoma City after earning a spring training visit.

=== Baltimore Orioles ===
On January 17, 2011, Ballard signed a minor league contract with the Baltimore Orioles organization. He started the season with the Triple–A Norfolk Tides, but was demoted to the Double–A Bowie Baysox after posting a 4.91 ERA with 38 strikeouts over 10 games.

On July 31, 2011, Ballard was called up to the major leagues to replace the struggling Jason Berken. He went unused out of the bullpen and was optioned back to Bowie the next day, becoming a phantom ballplayer. On August 31, Ballard was removed from the 40-man roster and sent outright to Bowie. On November 2, he elected free agency.

=== Washington Nationals ===
On December 27, 2011, Ballard signed a minor league contract with the Washington Nationals that included an invitation to spring training. He spent 2012 with the Double-A Harrisburg Senators, posting a 1-5 record and 4.31 ERA with 56 strikeouts in 64 2/3 innings pitched across 12 starts. Ballard elected free agency following the season on November 2, 2012.

=== Brother Elephants ===
On January 6, 2013, Ballard signed with the Brother Elephants of the Chinese Professional Baseball League. In 3 starts for the Elephants, he struggled to a 1-1 record and 5.79 ERA with 8 strikeouts across 9 1/3 innings pitched. Ballard was released by the team on April 12.

=== Southern Maryland Blue Crabs ===
On May 1, 2013, Ballard signed with the Southern Maryland Blue Crabs of the Atlantic League of Professional Baseball. In 17 starts for the Blue Crabs, he compiled a 7-7 record and 4.89 ERA with 60 strikeouts across 92 innings of work. Ballard became a free agent following the season.
