= Derrick Nnadi =

American football player (born 1996)

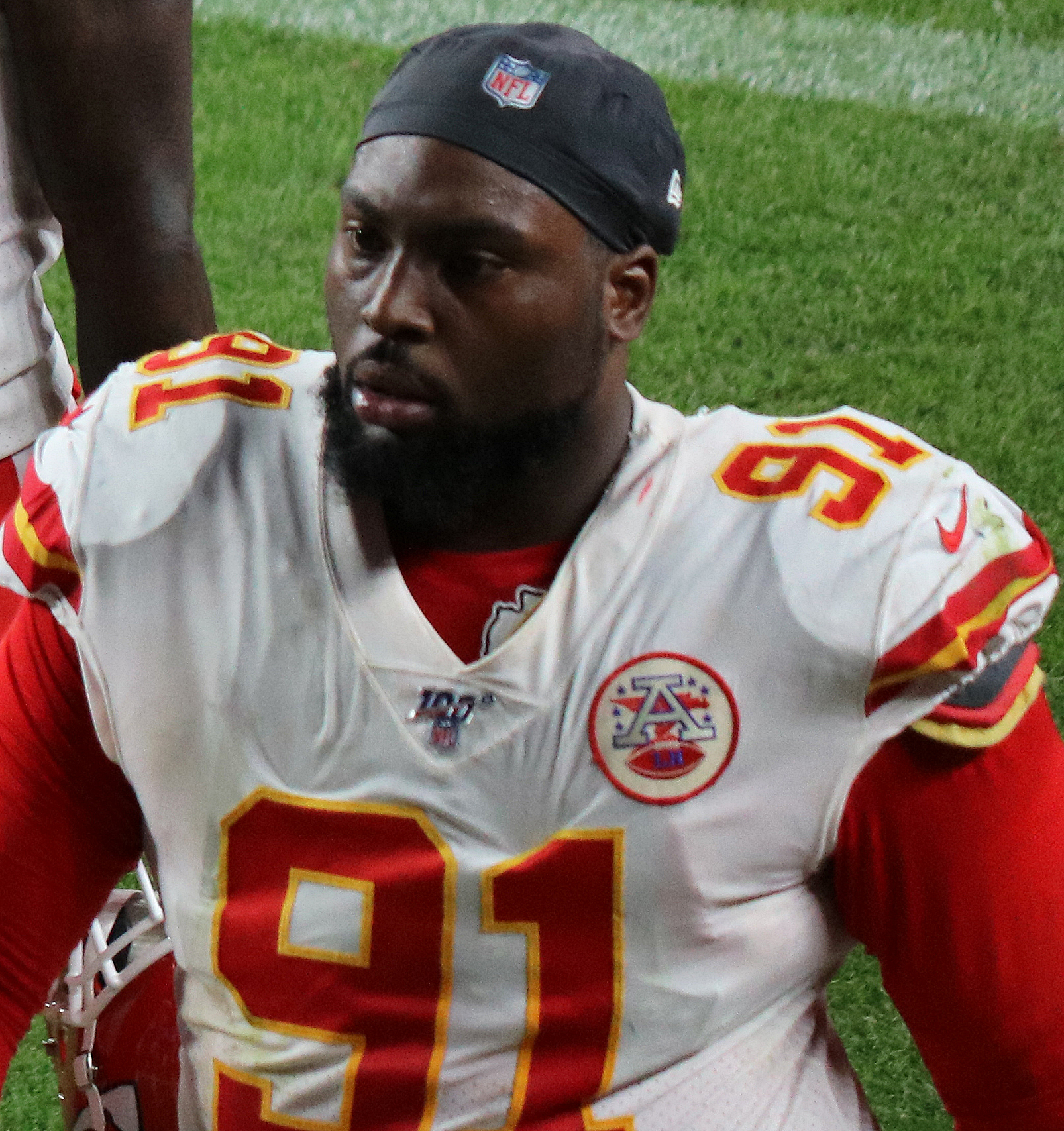
- Nnadi with the Kansas City Chiefs in 2019

Profile
- Position: Defensive tackle

Personal information
- Born: May 9, 1996 (age 30); Virginia Beach, Virginia, U.S.
- Listed height: 6 ft 1 in (1.85 m)
- Listed weight: 317 lb (144 kg)

Career information
- High school: Ocean Lakes (Virginia Beach)
- College: Florida State (2014–2017)
- NFL draft: 2018: 3rd round, 75th overall pick

Career history
- Kansas City Chiefs (2018–2024); New York Jets (2025)*; Kansas City Chiefs (2025); Indianapolis Colts (2026)*
- * Offseason or practice squad member only

Awards and highlights
- 3× Super Bowl champion (LIV, LVII, LVIII); Third-team All-ACC (2017)

Career NFL statistics as of 2025
- Tackles: 249
- Sacks: 5
- Forced fumbles: 1
- Pass deflections: 2
- Interceptions: 1
- Stats at Pro Football Reference

Derrick Nnadi (born May 9, 1996) is an American professional football defensive tackle. He played college football for the Florida State Seminoles.

== Professional career ==
On December 9, 2017, it was announced that Nnadi had accepted his invitation to play in the 2018 Senior Bowl. On January 19, 2018, it was reported that he would not be participating in the Senior Bowl due to an unspecified injury. He attended the NFL Scouting Combine in Indianapolis and completed all of the combine and positional drills. His overall performance was described as poor and was a detriment to his draft stock. On March 20, 2018, he participated in Florida State's pro day and chose to perform the short shuttle (4.97s) and vertical jump (25.5"). He attended a private workout with the New York Jets. At the conclusion of the pre-draft process, Nnadi was projected to be a third or fourth round pick by NFL draft experts and scouts. He was ranked as the seventh best defensive tackle in the draft by Scouts Inc. and was ranked the 11th best defensive tackle prospect by DraftScout.com.

External videos
- Derrick Nnadi's NFL Combine Workout
- NFL Draft Profile: Derrick Nnadi

Pre-draft measurables
Height	Weight	Arm length	Hand span	Wingspan	40-yard dash	10-yard split	20-yard split	20-yard shuttle	Three-cone drill	Vertical jump	Broad jump	Bench press
6 ft 1 in (1.85 m)	317 lb (144 kg)	33 1/2 in (0.85 m)	9 7/8 in (0.25 m)	6 ft 7 3/4 in (2.03 m)	5.38 s	1.81 s	3.04 s	4.97 s	8.15 s	27.0 in (0.69 m)	8 ft 0 in (2.44 m)	25 reps
All values from NFL Combine/Pro Day

=== Kansas City Chiefs (first stint) ===
The Kansas City Chiefs selected Nnadi in the third round with the 75th overall pick in the 2018 NFL draft. The Chiefs traded their third (86th overall) and fourth round (122nd overall) picks to the Baltimore Ravens in exchange for the Ravens' third round pick (75th overall) in order to draft Nnadi.

External videos
- Chiefs draft Derrick Nnadi 75th overall

On June 15, 2018, the Kansas City Chiefs signed him to a four-year, $3.74 million contract featuring a signing bonus of $959,400.

In Week 11 of the 2019 season against the Los Angeles Chargers on Monday Night Football, Nnadi recorded his first career interception off Philip Rivers in the 24–17 win. The Chiefs went on to win Super Bowl LIV over the San Francisco 49ers, their first championship in 50 years.

On March 20, 2022, Nnadi re-signed with the Chiefs. He won his second Super Bowl when the Chiefs defeated the Philadelphia Eagles in Super Bowl LVII.

He re-signed with the Chiefs on March 23, 2023. He won his third Super Bowl when the Chiefs defeated the San Francisco 49ers in Super Bowl LVIII.

Nnadi re-signed with the Chiefs on March 19, 2024. On July 17, he was placed on the Active/Physically Unable to Perform (PUP) list. On August 6, the Chiefs activated Nnadi off of the PUP list.

=== New York Jets ===
On March 16, 2025, Nnadi signed with the New York Jets.

=== Kansas City Chiefs (second stint) ===
On August 25, 2025, Nnadi was traded to the Kansas City Chiefs with a conditional 2027 seventh-round pick in exchange for a conditional 2027 sixth-round selection, reuniting Nnadi with his former team.

=== Indianapolis Colts ===
On March 13, 2026, Nnadi signed a one-year $1,487,500 contract with the Indianapolis Colts. He was released by Indianapolis as a part of final roster cuts on August 30.

== NFL career statistics ==
Legend
	Won the Super Bowl
**Bold**	Career high

=== Regular season ===
Year	Team	Games		Tackles						Interceptions						Fumbles	
Year	Team	GP	GS	Cmb	Solo	Ast	Sck	TFL	Sfty	PD	Int	Yds	Avg	Lng	TD	FF	FR
2018	KC	16	11	35	17	18	0.0	0	0	0	0	0	0.0	0	0	0	0
2019	KC	16	16	**48**	18	**30**	1.0	**3**	0	**1**	**1**	0	0.0	0	0	**1**	0
2020	KC	15	15	47	**23**	24	0.0	0	0	0	0	0	0.0	0	0	0	0
2021	KC	**17**	10	38	21	17	**3.0**	2	0	0	0	0	0.0	0	0	0	0
2022	KC	**17**	**17**	25	11	14	0.0	1	0	0	0	0	0.0	0	0	0	0
2023	KC	**17**	**17**	29	16	13	1.0	1	0	**1**	0	0	0.0	0	0	0	0
2024	KC	**17**	1	11	3	8	0.0	0	0	0	0	0	0.0	0	0	0	0
2025	KC	15	11	16	10	6	0.0	0	0	0	0	0	0.0	0	0	0	0
Career		130	98	249	119	130	5.0	7	0	2	1	0	0.0	0	0	1	0

=== Postseason ===
Year	Team	Games		Tackles						Interceptions						Fumbles	
Year	Team	GP	GS	Cmb	Solo	Ast	Sck	TFL	Sfty	PD	Int	Yds	Avg	Lng	TD	FF	FR
2018	KC	2	2	8	1	7	0.0	**1**	0	0	0	0	0.0	0	0	0	0
2019	KC	**3**	**3**	7	**4**	3	0.0	**1**	0	0	0	0	0.0	0	0	0	0
2020	KC	**3**	**3**	**11**	3	**8**	0.0	0	0	0	0	0	0.0	0	0	0	0
2021	KC	**3**	0	4	2	2	0.0	0	0	0	0	0	0.0	0	0	0	0
2022	KC	**3**	**3**	3	1	2	**1.0**	**1**	0	0	0	0	0.0	0	0	0	0
2023	KC	1	1	1	0	1	0.0	0	0	0	0	0	0.0	0	0	0	0
2024	KC	3	0	4	3	1	0.0	0	0	0	0	0	0.0	0	0	0	0
Career		18	12	38	14	24	1.0	3	0	0	0	0	0.0	0	0	0	0

== Personal life ==
Nnadi is of Nigerian descent. He attended Ocean Lakes High School in Virginia Beach, Virginia.

Nnadi has celebrated each Chiefs win during the 2019 season by paying the adoption fee for a dog at a local Kansas City shelter. He celebrated winning Super Bowl LIV by paying the adoption fees for all adoptable dogs at the shelter.
