= Bradley Chubb =

American football player (born 1996)

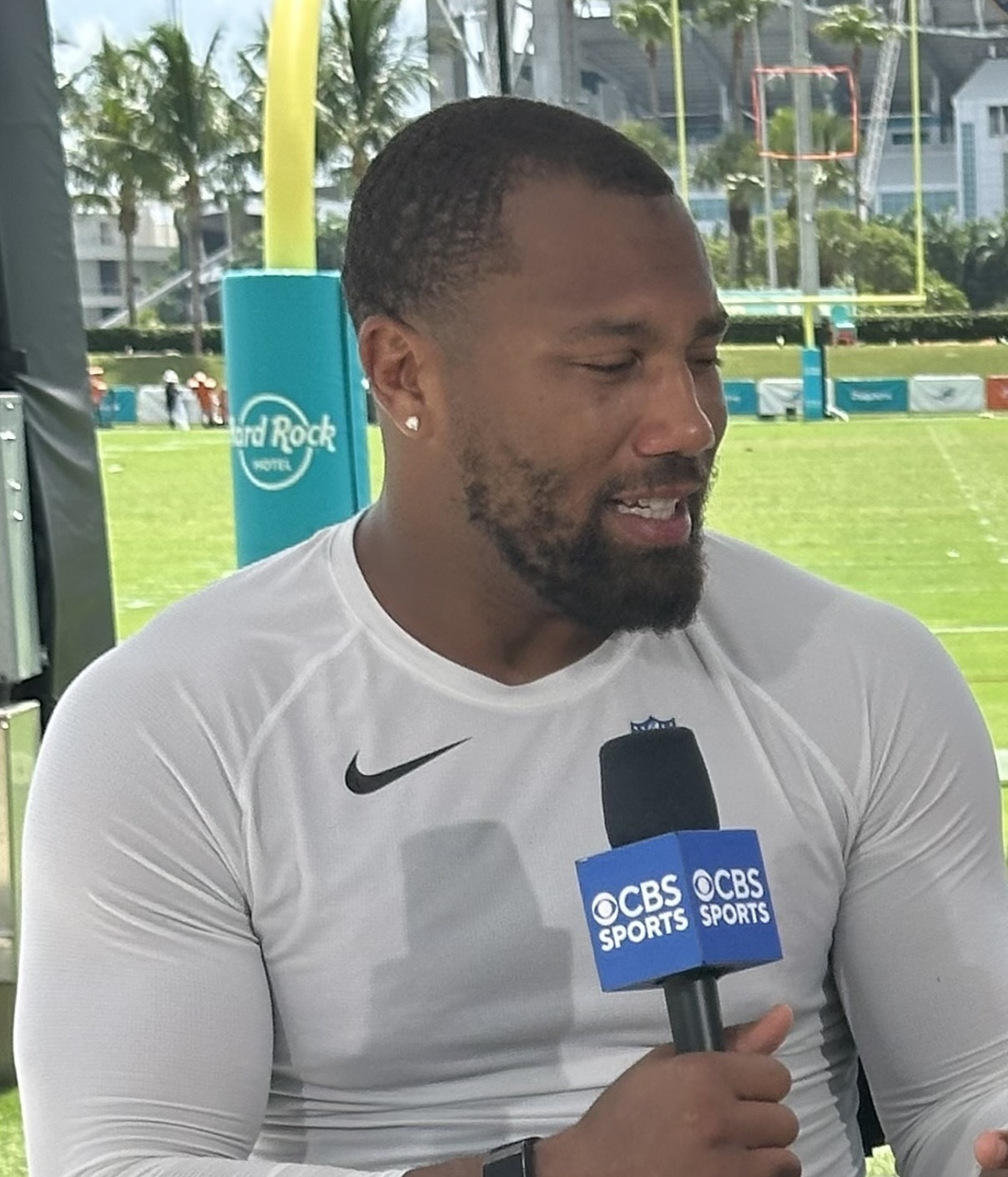
- Chubb in 2025

No. 9 – Buffalo Bills
- Position: Outside linebacker

Personal information
- Born: June 24, 1996 (age 30); Austell, Georgia, U.S.
- Listed height: 6 ft 4 in (1.93 m)
- Listed weight: 268 lb (122 kg)

Career information
- High school: Hillgrove (Powder Springs, Georgia)
- College: NC State (2014–2017)
- NFL draft: 2018: 1st round, 5th overall pick

Career history
- Denver Broncos (2018–2022); Miami Dolphins (2022–2025); Buffalo Bills (2026–present)

Awards and highlights
- 2× Pro Bowl (2020, 2022); NFL forced fumbles co-leader (2023); PFWA All-Rookie Team (2018); Bronko Nagurski Trophy (2017); Ted Hendricks Award (2017); ACC Defensive Player of the Year (2017); Unanimous All-American (2017); First-team All-ACC (2017); NC State Wolfpack Jersey No. 9 honored

Career NFL statistics as of Week 11, 2026
- Total tackles: 325
- Sacks: 49.5
- Forced fumbles: 15
- Fumble recoveries: 4
- Pass deflections: 8
- Interceptions: 1
- Stats at Pro Football Reference

Bradley Austin Chubb (born June 24, 1996) is an American professional football outside linebacker for the Buffalo Bills of the National Football League (NFL). He played college football for the NC State Wolfpack, and was selected by the Denver Broncos in the first round of the 2018 NFL draft. Chubb was traded to the Miami Dolphins in 2022, and played for them until he was released in 2026.

== Early life ==
Chubb was a hybrid linebacker-defensive end at Hillgrove High School, where he helped the Hawks advance to the Georgia 6A quarterfinals as a senior. He officially committed to North Carolina State University on June 24, 2013. Chubb also had offers from Duke, West Virginia, Wake Forest, East Carolina, and others.

== College career ==
As a freshman, Chubb received marginal playing time, mostly on special teams. He switched from outside linebacker to defensive end before his sophomore season and broke the starting lineup by the beginning of the season.

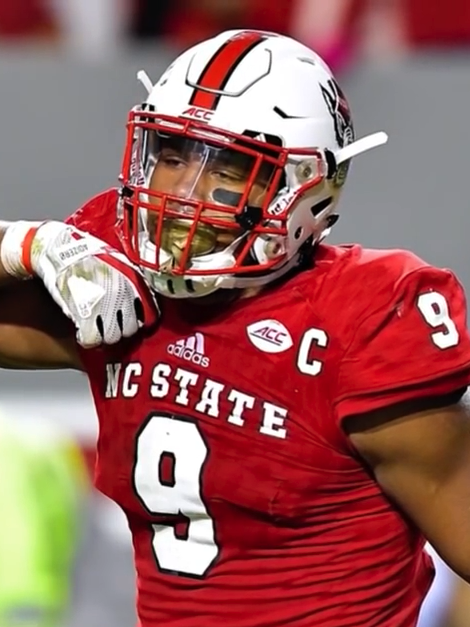
Chubb with the NC State Wolfpack in 2017

As a junior, he continued to start and became a team leader off the field. He finished third in the Atlantic Coast Conference in tackles for loss. During the 2016 Independence Bowl, Chubb sacked Vanderbilt quarterback Kyle Shurmur, which made a favorable impression on Kyle's father Pat Shurmur, who scouted Chubb extensively in early 2018.

In his senior season, Chubb, after winning a game against then-No. 12 Florida State, ran to midfield at FSU's Doak Campbell Stadium and spat on the Seminole logo in an apparent act of disrespect. He later apologized for the incident. As for a cause, he alluded to a February 2017 Instagram post on which some Florida State players negatively commented. On November 4, 2017, playing Clemson, Chubb took opposing quarterback Kelly Bryant's towel three times. After not eliciting a reaction after the first two, a Clemson offensive lineman held Chubb after the third time until he gave the towel back. Chubb met with officials after the incident but was not penalized. A week later in a game against Boston College, Chubb recorded two and a half sacks to pass Mario Williams as the all-time sack leader in NC State Wolfpack history. In the same game, he also passed Williams to become the Wolfpack leader in tackles for loss.

During his senior season at NC State, Chubb recorded ten sacks and had almost a third of his 72 total tackles go for a loss. The 23 tackles for loss put him second among NCAA Division I players in 2017. His postseason accolades included being named ACC Defensive Player of the Year, first-team All ACC, first-team All-America, the Bronko Nagurski Trophy, and the Ted Hendricks Award.

=== College statistics ===
| Season | Team | GP | Defense | | | | |
| Season | Team | GP | Cmb | TfL | Sck | Int | FF |
|---|---|---|---|---|---|---|---|
| 2014 | NC State | 2 | 4 | 0 | 0.0 | 0 | 0 |
| 2015 | NC State | 13 | 66 | 10.5 | 5.0 | 1 | 2 |
| 2016 | NC State | 13 | 56 | 21 | 10.0 | 0 | 3 |
| 2017 | NC State | 12 | 72 | 23 | 10.0 | 0 | 1 |
| Total | | 40 | 198 | 54.5 | 25.0 | 1 | 6 |

== Professional career ==
Chubb was projected to go in the first round of the 2018 NFL draft. Different projections pegged him as going within the top five (as high as first to the Cleveland Browns) or to the Indianapolis Colts at the sixth pick. During the 2018 NFL Scouting Combine, Chubb named Von Miller and Khalil Mack as players whom he models his play after.

Pre-draft measurables
| Height | Weight | Arm length | Hand span | Wingspan | 40-yard dash | 10-yard split | 20-yard split | 20-yard shuttle | Three-cone drill | Vertical jump | Broad jump | Bench press |
|---|---|---|---|---|---|---|---|---|---|---|---|---|
| 6 ft 4 3/8 in (1.94 m) | 269 lb (122 kg) | 34 in (0.86 m) | 9 7/8 in (0.25 m) | 6 ft 7 in (2.01 m) | 4.65 s | 1.63 s | 2.72 s | 4.34 s | 7.37 s | 36.0 in (0.91 m) | 10 ft 1 in (3.07 m) | 24 reps |
All values from NFL Combine/Pro Day

=== Denver Broncos ===
==== 2018 ====
External videos
- Broncos draft Bradley Chubb 5th overall
- Chubb receives a message from his mom and dad

The Denver Broncos selected Chubb in the first round with the fifth overall pick in the 2018 NFL Draft. Chubb was the first defensive end drafted in 2018. On June 21, 2018, the Broncos signed Chubb to a fully guaranteed four-year, $27.27 million contract that includes a signing bonus of $17.91 million.

Chubb entered training camp slated as a starting outside linebacker. Head coach Vance Joseph named Chubb and Von Miller the starting outside linebackers to begin the regular season. They started alongside inside linebackers Todd Davis and Brandon Marshall.

He made his professional regular season debut and first career start in the Broncos' season-opener against the Seattle Seahawks and recorded three combined tackles and was credited with half a sack during a 27–24 victory. He made his first career sack with teammate Darian Stewart on Seahawks' quarterback Russell Wilson for a six-yard loss during the first quarter. In Week 3, he recorded two solo tackles and made his first career solo sack on Ravens' quarterback Joe Flacco during a 27–14 loss at the Baltimore Ravens. On October 14, 2018, Chubb recorded five combined tackles and made a season-high three sacks on quarterback Jared Goff as the Broncos lost 23–20 against the Los Angeles Rams. The following week, he made three solo tackles, two sacks, and made one forced fumble by quarterback Josh Rosen during a 45–10 win at the Arizona Cardinals in Week 7. For his efforts, Chubb was named NFL Defensive Rookie of the Month for October. In Week 11, he collected season-high seven combined tackles and made one sack during a 23–22 win at the Los Angeles Chargers. He started in all 16 games in 2018 and recorded 60 combined tackles (41 solo), 12 sacks, two forced fumbles, and one pass deflection. He was named to the PFWA All-Rookie Team. He was ranked 82nd by his fellow players on the NFL Top 100 Players of 2019.

==== 2019 ====
During Week 4 against the Jacksonville Jaguars, Chubb recorded his first sack of the season on Gardner Minshew in the 26–24 loss. At one point, Chubb left the game due to an injury but briefly returned. Later on, it was reported that Chubb had suffered a partial tear of the ACL in his left knee, which prematurely ended his 2019 season.

==== 2020 ====
In Week 4 against the New York Jets, Chubb recorded his first 2.5 sacks of the season on Sam Darnold during the 37–28 win.

On December 21, 2020, Chubb was voted to the 2021 Pro Bowl. In the 2020 season, Chubb appeared in and started 14 games, he finished with 7.5 sacks, 42 total tackles (26 solo), and one forced fumble. He was ranked 40th by his fellow players on the NFL Top 100 Players of 2021.

==== 2021 ====
The Broncos exercised the fifth-year option on Chubb's contract on April 30, 2021, with a guarantee salary of $12.72 million for the 2022 season. He was placed on injured reserve on September 22, 2021, after undergoing ankle surgery. He was activated on November 27. He appeared in and started seven games and had 21 total tackles (nine solo), one interception, and two passes defended.

=== Miami Dolphins ===
On November 1, 2022, the Broncos traded Chubb along with a 2025 fifth-round pick to the Miami Dolphins in exchange for running back Chase Edmonds, a 2023 first-round pick (pick from San Francisco), and a 2024 fourth-round pick. He then signed a five-year, $110 million extension with $63.2 million guaranteed. Chubb finished the 2022 season with eight sacks, 39 total tackles (20 solo), one pass defended, and three fumble recoveries.

On January 30, 2023, Chubb was named to his second Pro Bowl, this time as a replacement to Khalil Mack.

In Week 15 of the 2023 season, Chubb recorded seven tackles, three sacks, two forced fumbles and a recovery in a 30–0 win over the New York Jets, earning AFC Defensive Player of the Week. He suffered a torn ACL in Miami's loss to the Baltimore Ravens in Week 17 and was ruled out for the season.

On July 18, 2024, Chubb was placed on the active/physically unable to perform (PUP) list, and placed on reserves to begin the season.

In Week 17 of the 2025 season, Chubb had three pressures, two tackles for loss, two QB hits, and two sacks, including a fourth-quarter strip sack of Baker Mayfield in a 20-17 win over the Tampa Bay Buccaneers, earning AFC Defensive Player of the Week. Chubb started all 17 games for Miami during the regular season, recording 8.5 sacks, 47 total tackles, and two forced fumbles.

On March 11, 2026, Chubb was released by the Dolphins in order to save $7.3 million in cap space.

=== Buffalo Bills ===
On March 12, 2026, Chubb signed a three-year contract with the Buffalo Bills worth up to $52 million, of which $29 million was guaranteed.

== NFL career statistics ==
Legend
| | Led the league |
| **Bold** | Career high |

=== Regular season ===
| Year | Team | Games | | Tackles | | | | | | Interceptions | | | | | | Fumbles | |
| Year | Team | GP | GS | Cmb | Solo | Ast | Sck | TfL | QBH | PD | Int | Yds | Avg | Lng | TD | FF | FR |
|---|---|---|---|---|---|---|---|---|---|---|---|---|---|---|---|---|---|
| 2018 | DEN | 16 | 16 | 60 | 41 | 19 | **12.0** | **14** | 21 | 1 | 0 | 0 | 0.0 | 0 | 0 | 2 | 1 |
| 2019 | DEN | 4 | 4 | 21 | 16 | 5 | 1.0 | 5 | 6 | 1 | 0 | 0 | 0.0 | 0 | 0 | 1 | 0 |
| 2020 | DEN | 14 | 14 | 42 | 26 | 16 | 7.5 | 9 | 19 | 0 | 0 | 0 | 0.0 | 0 | 0 | 1 | 0 |
| 2021 | DEN | 7 | 7 | 21 | 9 | 12 | 0.0 | 1 | 4 | **2** | **1** | **21** | **21.0** | **21** | 0 | 0 | 0 |
| 2022 | DEN | 8 | 8 | 26 | 15 | 11 | 5.5 | 4 | 8 | 1 | 0 | 0 | 0.0 | 0 | 0 | 2 | 0 |
| 2022 | MIA | 8 | 7 | 13 | 5 | 8 | 2.5 | 1 | 12 | 0 | 0 | 0 | 0.0 | 0 | 0 | 1 | 0 |
| 2023 | MIA | 16 | 16 | **73** | **45** | **28** | 11.0 | 11 | **22** | **2** | 0 | 0 | 0.0 | 0 | 0 | **6** | **2** |
| 2024 | MIA | 0 | 0 | Did not play due to injury | | | | | | | | | | | | | |
| 2025 | MIA | 17 | 17 | 47 | 24 | 23 | 8.5 | 8 | 20 | 0 | 0 | 0 | 0.0 | 0 | 0 | 2 | 1 |
| 2026 | BUF | 10 | 10 | 23 | 8 | 15 | 1.5 | 2 | 9 | 1 | 0 | 0 | 0.0 | 0 | 0 | 0 | 0 |
| Career | | 99 | 98 | 325 | 186 | 139 | 49.5 | 55 | 121 | 8 | 1 | 21 | 21.0 | 21 | 0 | 15 | 4 |

=== Postseason ===
| Year | Team | Games | | Tackles | | | | | | Interceptions | | | | | | Fumbles | |
| Year | Team | GP | GS | Cmb | Solo | Ast | Sck | TfL | QBH | PD | Int | Yds | Avg | Lng | TD | FF | FR |
|---|---|---|---|---|---|---|---|---|---|---|---|---|---|---|---|---|---|
| 2022 | MIA | 1 | 0 | 1 | 1 | 0 | 1.0 | 0 | 0 | 0 | 0 | 0 | 0.0 | 0 | 0 | 1 | 0 |
| 2023 | MIA | 0 | 0 | | Did not play due to injury | | | | | | | | | | | | |
| Career | | 1 | 0 | 1 | 1 | 0 | 1.0 | 0 | 0 | 0 | 0 | 0 | 0.0 | 0 | 0 | 1 | 0 |

== Personal life ==
Chubb's brother, Brandon Chubb, played college football at Wake Forest, and signed as an undrafted free agent with the Los Angeles Rams in 2016. Their father, Aaron, was a late-round draft pick of the New England Patriots in 1989. Chubb is the cousin of Nick Chubb, who played for the Georgia Bulldogs, and was selected by the Cleveland Browns thirty picks after Bradley was drafted, with the thirty-fifth overall pick in the second round of the 2018 NFL draft.
