= Marcus Davis (gridiron football) =

American gridiron football player (born 1989)

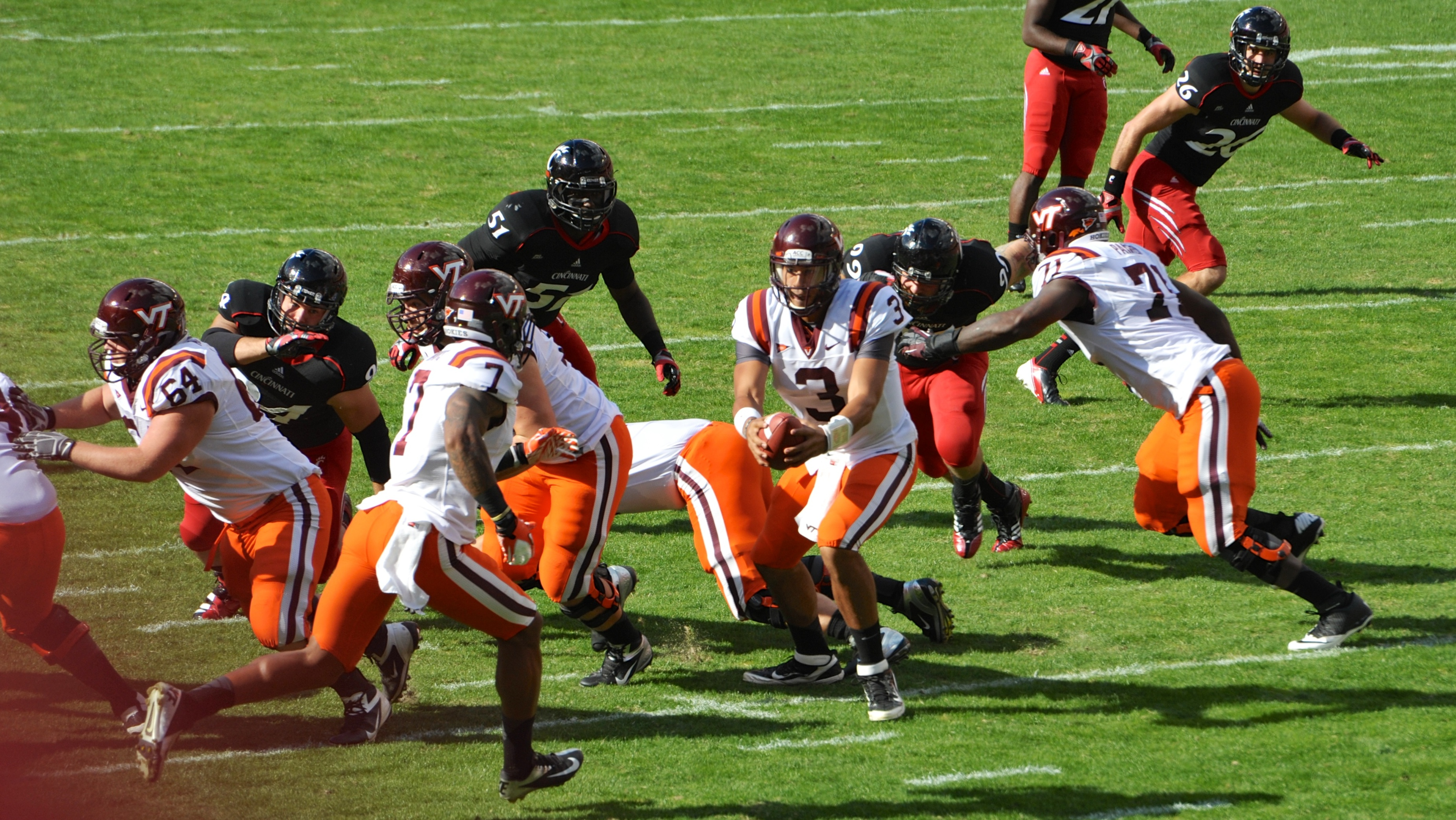
- Marcus Davis (#7) with Virginia Tech in 2012

No. 7
- Position: Wide receiver

Personal information
- Born: December 21, 1989 (age 36); Virginia Beach, Virginia, U.S.
- Listed height: 6 ft 4 in (1.93 m)
- Listed weight: 232 lb (105 kg)

Career information
- High school: Ocean Lakes (Virginia Beach)
- College: Virginia Tech
- NFL draft: 2013: undrafted

Career history
- New York Giants (2013)*; New York Jets (2013)*; Saskatchewan Roughriders (2015)
- * Offseason or practice squad member only
- Stats at Pro Football Reference

Marcus Darnell Davis (born December 21, 1989) is an American former football wide receiver. He was signed as an undrafted free agent by the New York Giants in 2013. He played college football at Virginia Tech.

== Early life ==
He attended Ocean Lakes High School in Virginia Beach, Virginia. He was named first-team All-Tidewater as a quarterback by The Virginian Pilot and also was selected to the First-team All-Beach District. He was ranked as the 9th best prospect in the state of Virginia by The Roanoke Times. He was ranked as the 112th best wide receiver prospect in the country by SuperPrep.

== College career ==
=== Virginia Tech ===
==== Freshman season ====
In his freshman year, he only recorded five receptions, 125 receiving yards along with one receiving touchdown.

==== Sophomore season ====
In his sophomore year, he had 19 receptions, 239 receiving yards and two receiving touchdowns.

==== Junior season ====
In his junior year, he had 30 receptions, 510 receiving yards and five receiving touchdowns.

==== Senior season ====
In his senior year, he had a career-high 51 receptions, 953 receiving yards and five receiving touchdowns. On December 5, 2012, he was selected as a 2012 Coaches All-ACC Honorable Mention following the season.

== Professional career ==
=== 2013 NFL Combine ===
Pre-draft measurables
| Height | Weight | Arm length | Hand span | 40-yard dash | Three-cone drill | Vertical jump | Broad jump | Bench press |
|---|---|---|---|---|---|---|---|---|
| 6 ft 3 in (1.91 m) | 233 lb (106 kg) | 32 3/4 in (0.83 m) | 10 1/4 in (0.26 m) | 4.56 s | 7.15 s | 39.5 in (1.00 m) | 120 ft 0 in (36.58 m) | 19 reps |
All values from the NFL Combine

=== New York Giants ===
On April 27, 2013, he signed with the New York Giants as an undrafted free agent following the 2013 NFL draft.

=== New York Jets ===
On May 15, 2013, he was claimed off waivers by New York Jets. He was waived on August 4, 2013. Upon clearing waivers, he was placed on the Jets' injured reserve list. Davis was released with an injury settlement on August 23, 2013.

=== Kansas City Chiefs ===
Marcus Davis signed to a deal with the Kansas City Chiefs during the offseason.

=== Saskatchewan Roughriders ===
Davis signed with the Saskatchewan Roughriders on September 9, 2015 and played in his first and only CFL game on October 31, 2015 where he had two catches for 11 yards. He was re-signed after the 2015 season, but was released during 2016 training camp on June 6, 2016.
