= 2015 Florida State Seminoles football team =

American college football season

2015 Florida State Seminoles football

Peach Bowl, L 24–38 vs. Houston
- Conference: Atlantic Coast Conference
- Atlantic Division

Ranking
- Coaches: No. 14
- AP: No. 14
- Record: 10–3 (6–2 ACC)
- Head coach: Jimbo Fisher (6th season)
- Co-offensive coordinators: Lawrence Dawsey (2nd season); Randy Sanders (2nd season)
- Offensive scheme: Pro-style
- Defensive coordinator: Charles Kelly (2nd season)
- Base defense: 4–2–5
- Captain: Game Captains: Cason Beatty; Lamarcus Brutus; Dalvin Cook; Ro'Derrick Hoskins; Tyler Hunter; Roderick Johnson; Derrick Mitchell; Giorgio Newberry; Reggie Northrup; Jalen Mack; Terrance Smith; Nile Lawrence-Stample; Freddie Stevenson; DeMarcus Walker; Kermit Whitfield; Jesus Wilson
- Home stadium: Doak Campbell Stadium

Uniform
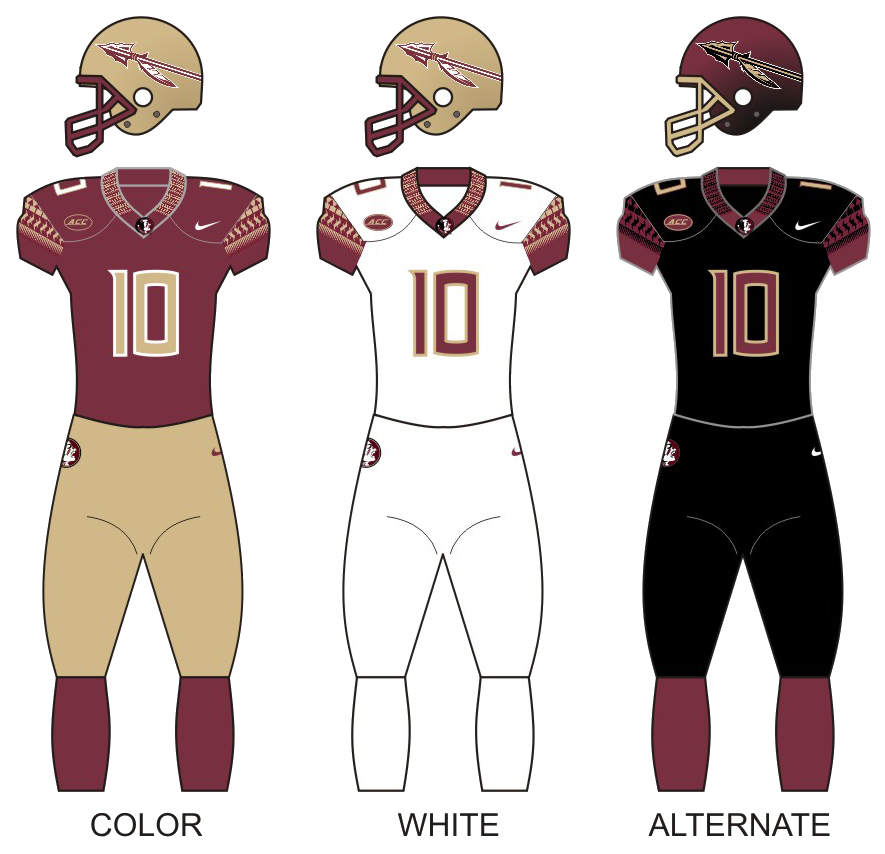

2015 Atlantic Coast Conference football standings
	Conf.			Overall
Team	W		L	W		L
Atlantic Division
No. 2 Clemson x$^	8	–	0	14	–	1
No. 14 Florida State	6	–	2	10	–	3
Louisville	5	–	3	8	–	5
NC State	3	–	5	7	–	6
Syracuse	2	–	6	4	–	8
Wake Forest	1	–	7	3	–	9
Boston College	0	–	8	3	–	9
Coastal Division
No. 15 North Carolina x	8	–	0	11	–	3
Pittsburgh	6	–	2	8	–	5
Miami (FL)	5	–	3	8	–	5
Duke	4	–	4	8	–	5
Virginia Tech	4	–	4	7	–	6
Virginia	3	–	5	4	–	8
Georgia Tech	1	–	7	3	–	9
Championship: Clemson 45, North Carolina 37
^ – College Football Playoff participant; $ – Conference champion; x – Division champion/co-champions; Rankings from AP Poll

The 2015 Florida State Seminoles football team, variously Florida State or FSU, represented Florida State University in the sport of American football during the 2015 NCAA Division I FBS college football season. Florida State competed in the Football Bowl Subdivision (FBS) of the National Collegiate Athletic Association (NCAA). The Seminoles were led by sixth-year head coach Jimbo Fisher and played their home games at Bobby Bowden Field at Doak Campbell Stadium in Tallahassee, Florida. They were members of the Atlantic Coast Conference, playing in the Atlantic Division. It was the Seminoles' 24th season as a member of the ACC and its 11th in the ACC Atlantic Division.

Florida State came into the season after a two-year run (2013 and 2014) in which the Seminoles won 27 games with a pair of ACC Championships, a BCS National Title, an appearance in the College Football Playoff, a Heisman Trophy winner, and eighteen NFL draft selections.

They finished the season 10–3, 6–2 in ACC play, to finish in second place in the Atlantic Division. They were invited to the Peach Bowl where they lost to Houston.

Florida State seniors – Giorgio Newberry, Derrick Mitchell, Nile Lawrence-Stample, Reggie Northrup, Terrance Smith, Tyler Hunter, Javien Elliott, Keelin Smith, Lamarcus Brutus and Cason Beatty – ended their college careers with 49 wins over the course of four seasons, becoming the winningest class in school history.

== Before the season ==
=== Returning ===
==== Offense ====
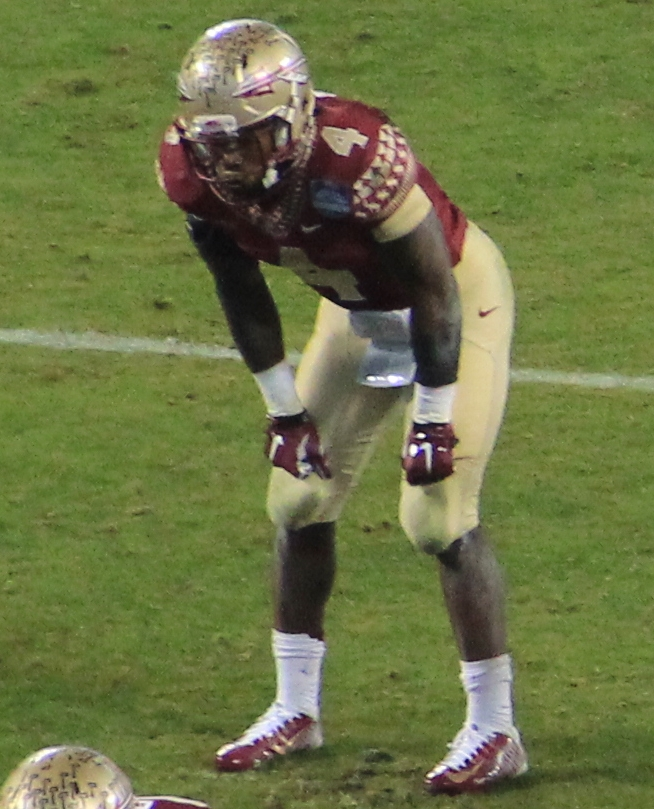
Running back Dalvin Cook returned for his sophomore season.

The Seminoles returned three starters on offense:

- Sean Maguire
- Dalvin Cook
- Mario Pender
- Travis Rudolph
- Ermon Lane
- Roderick Johnson
- Ryan Hoefield
- Freddie Stevenson
- Kermit Whitfield
- Jesus Wilson

==== Defense ====
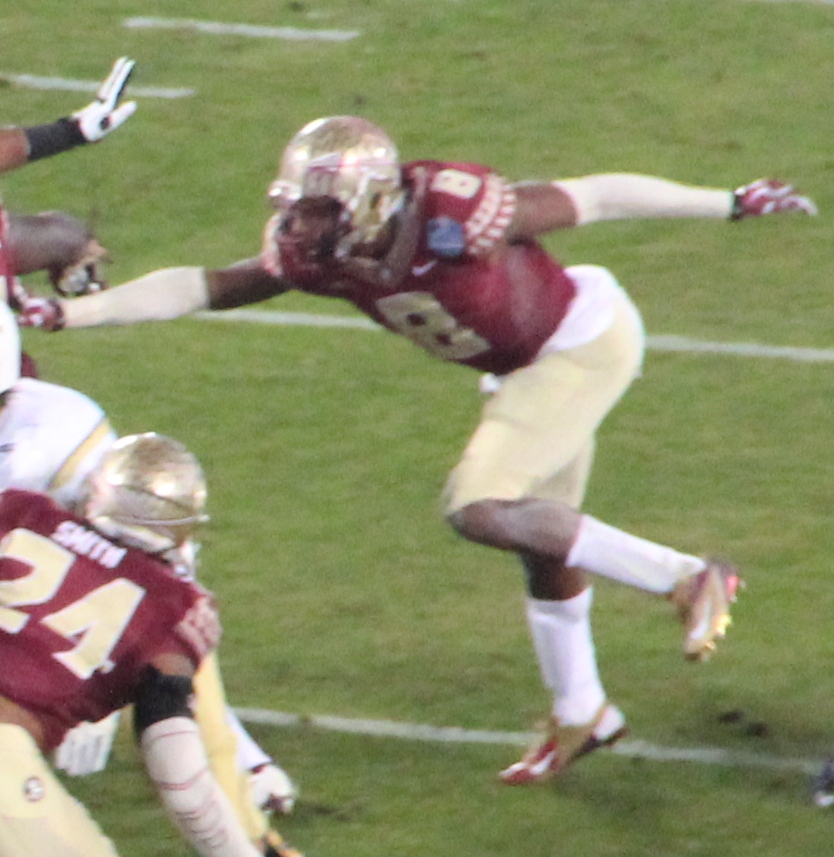
Jalen Ramsey returned for his junior season, switching positions from Safety to Cornerback.

The Seminoles returned seven starters on defense:

- Nile Lawrence-Stample
- Jalen Ramsey
- Lorenzo Featherston
- DeMarcus Walker
- Matthew Thomas
- Jacob Pugh
- Nate Andrews
- Trey Marshall
- Derrick Mitchell
- Reggie Northrup
- Terrance Smith
- Tyler Hunter
- Chris Casher
- Derrick Nnadi
- Marquez White
- Lamarcus Brutus

==== Special teams ====
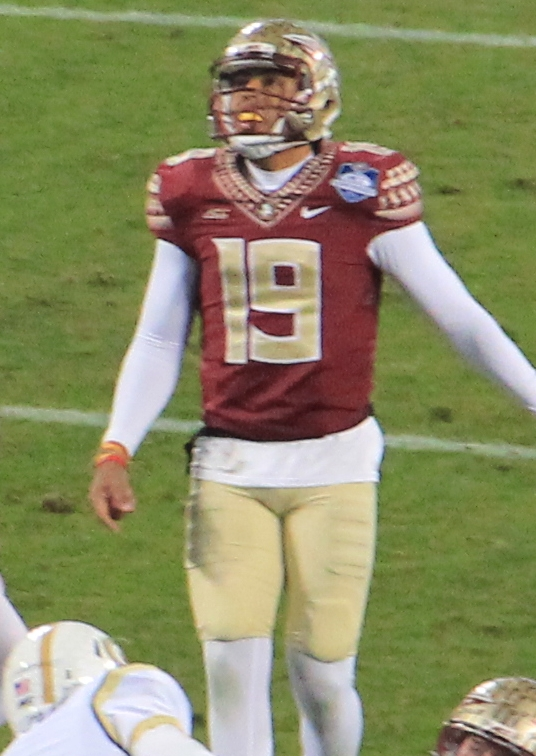
Kicker Roberto Aguayo returned for his redshirt junior season.

The Seminoles returned two starters on special teams:

- Roberto Aguayo
- Cason Beatty

=== Departures ===
==== Offense ====
- Jameis Winston
- Rashad Greene
- Nick O'Leary
- Karlos Williams
- Christian Green
- Josue Matias
- Cameron Erving
- Tre' Jackson
- Bobby Hart
- Austin Barron

==== Defense ====
- Desmond Hollin
- P. J. Williams
- Mario Edwards Jr.
- Ronald Darby
- Eddie Goldman

=== Transfers ===
- Everett Golson (from Notre Dame)

==== Offense ====
- Ruben Carter (to Toledo)
- John Franklin III (to East Mississippi CC/Auburn)
- Isaiah Jones (to East Mississippi CC)

==== Defense ====
- E.J. Levenberry (to Connecticut)

=== Recruiting class ===
Calvin Brewton, George Campbell, Derwin James, De'Andre Johnson, Jacques Patrick, Da'Vante Phillips and Josh Sweat were early enrollees.

College recruiting (2015)
Name	Hometown	School	Height	Weight	40^{‡}	Commit date
Abdul Bello; OL	Montverde, Florida	Montverde Academy	6 ft 5 in (1.96 m)	298 lb (135 kg)	N/A	Jul 22, 2014
Abdul Bello; OL	Recruit ratings: Scout: Rivals: 247Sports: ESPN:					
Calvin Brewton; DB (S)	Miami	Miami Central HS	6 ft 0 in (1.83 m)	175 lb (79 kg)	4.66	Jan 7, 2014
Calvin Brewton; DB (S)	Recruit ratings: Scout: Rivals: 247Sports: ESPN:					
George Campbell; ATH (WR)	Tarpon Springs, Florida	East Lake HS	6 ft 4 in (1.93 m)	190 lb (86 kg)	4.36	Sep 5, 2014
George Campbell; ATH (WR)	Recruit ratings: Scout: Rivals: 247Sports: ESPN:					
Deondre Francois; QB	Bradenton, Florida	IMG Academy	6 ft 0 in (1.83 m)	191 lb (87 kg)	N/A	Feb 4, 2015
Deondre Francois; QB	Recruit ratings: Scout: Rivals: 247Sports: ESPN:					
Ethan Frith; OL (OT/LQ)	Summit, Mississippi	North Pike HS	6 ft 7 in (2.01 m)	320 lb (150 kg)	N/A	Dec 4, 2014
Ethan Frith; OL (OT/LQ)	Recruit ratings: Scout:					
Derwin James; DB (S)	Haines City, Florida	Haines City HS	6 ft 1 in (1.85 m)	199 lb (90 kg)	4.50	Feb 25, 2012
Derwin James; DB (S)	Recruit ratings: Scout: Rivals: 247Sports: ESPN:					
De'Andre Johnson; QB	Jacksonville, Florida	First Coast HS	6 ft 2 in (1.88 m)	186 lb (84 kg)	4.67	Jul 20, 2012
De'Andre Johnson; QB	Recruit ratings: Scout: Rivals: 247Sports: ESPN:					
Sh'Mar Kilby-Lane; LB	Hallandale Beach, Florida	Hallandale HS	6 ft 2 in (1.88 m)	220 lb (100 kg)	N/A	Jun 7, 2014
Sh'Mar Kilby-Lane; LB	Recruit ratings: Scout: Rivals: 247Sports: ESPN:					
Marcus Lewis; DB (CB)	Washington, D.C.	Gonzaga College HS	6 ft 0 in (1.83 m)	194 lb (88 kg)	N/A	Feb 4, 2015
Marcus Lewis; DB (CB)	Recruit ratings: Scout: Rivals: 247Sports: ESPN:					
Tarvarus McFadden; DB (CB)	Plantation, Florida	American Heritage HS	6 ft 2 in (1.88 m)	195 lb (88 kg)	4.60	Oct 31, 2014
Tarvarus McFadden; DB (CB)	Recruit ratings: Scout: Rivals: 247Sports: ESPN:					
Cole Minshew; OL (OG)	Pridgen, Georgia	Coffee County HS	6 ft 4 in (1.93 m)	305 lb (138 kg)	N/A	Feb 22, 2014
Cole Minshew; OL (OG)	Recruit ratings: Scout: Rivals: 247Sports: ESPN:					
Nyqwan Murray; WR	Orlando, Florida	Oak Ridge HS	5 ft 11 in (1.80 m)	164 lb (74 kg)	N/A	May 17, 2014
Nyqwan Murray; WR	Recruit ratings: Scout: Rivals: 247Sports: ESPN:					
Jacques Patrick; RB	Orlando, Florida	Timber Creek HS	6 ft 1 in (1.85 m)	224 lb (102 kg)	4.66	Oct 27, 2014
Jacques Patrick; RB	Recruit ratings: Scout: Rivals: 247Sports: ESPN:					
Da'Vante Phillips; WR	Miami	Miami Central HS	6 ft 1 in (1.85 m)	206 lb (93 kg)	4.60	Dec 31, 2014
Da'Vante Phillips; WR	Recruit ratings: Scout: Rivals: 247Sports: ESPN:					
Lorenzo Phillips; LB (OLB)	Scooba, Mississippi	East Mississippi CC	6 ft 3 in (1.91 m)	220 lb (100 kg)	N/A	Jan 20, 2015
Lorenzo Phillips; LB (OLB)	Recruit ratings: Scout: Rivals: 247Sports: ESPN:					
David Robbins; OL (OG)	Glenelg, Maryland	Glenelg HS	6 ft 5 in (1.96 m)	305 lb (138 kg)	N/A	Apr 6, 2014
David Robbins; OL (OG)	Recruit ratings: Scout: Rivals: 247Sports: ESPN:					
Josh Sweat; DE	Chesapeake, Virginia	Oscar Smith HS	6 ft 5 in (1.96 m)	236 lb (107 kg)	4.46	Dec 10, 2014
Josh Sweat; DE	Recruit ratings: Scout: Rivals: 247Sports: ESPN:					
Auden Tate; WR	Tampa, Florida	Wharton HS	6 ft 4 in (1.93 m)	199 lb (90 kg)	4.60	Feb 4, 2015
Auden Tate; WR	Recruit ratings: Scout: Rivals: 247Sports: ESPN:					
Darvin Taylor II; DT	Chester, Virginia	Thomas Dale HS	6 ft 2 in (1.88 m)	311 lb (141 kg)	N/A	Aug 28, 2014
Darvin Taylor II; DT	Recruit ratings: Scout: Rivals: 247Sports: ESPN:					
Arthur "A.J." Westbrook; DB (S)	Daytona Beach, Florida	Mainland HS	6 ft 0 in (1.83 m)	180 lb (82 kg)	N/A	May 19, 2014
Arthur "A.J." Westbrook; DB (S)	Recruit ratings: Scout: Rivals: 247Sports: ESPN:					
Jalen Wilkerson; TE	Douglas, Georgia	Coffee County HS	6 ft 4 in (1.93 m)	230 lb (100 kg)	N/A	May 30, 2014
Jalen Wilkerson; TE	Recruit ratings: Scout: Rivals: 247Sports: ESPN:					
Overall recruit ranking: Scout: 11 Rivals: 3 247Sports: 3 ESPN: 2
‡ Refers to 40-yard dash; Note: In many cases, Scout, Rivals, 247Sports, On3, and ESPN may conflict in their listings of height, weight and 40 time.; In these cases, the average was taken. ESPN grades are on a 100-point scale.; Sources: "Florida State 2015 Football Commitments". Rivals.; "2015 Florida State Commits". Scout.; "2015 Player Commitments – Florida State". ESPN.; "Scout.com Team Recruiting Rankings". Scout.; "2015 Team Ranking". Rivals.com.

=== Coaching changes ===
After the 2014 season, defensive ends coach Sal Sunseri took a job with the Oakland Raiders. He was replaced by University of Florida assistant Brad Lawing.

=== Spring game ===
Florida State Spring Game

Quarter	1	2	3	4	Total
Gold	14	10	0	14	38
Garnet	3	14	0	0	17

at Doak Campbell Stadium • Tallahassee, Florida

- Date: April 11
- Game time: 2:00 p.m. EST
- Game weather: Temperature: 76 °F (24 °C) • Wind N 7 mph (11 km/h) • Weather: Rainy
- Game attendance: 17,250
- TV: ESPN3

Game information

First Quarter

- GOLD: Derwin James 41 yd interception return (Roberto Aguayo kick)
- GOLD: George Campbell 65 yd pass from J.J. Cosentino (Roberto Aguayo kick)
- GARNET: Roberto Aguayo 47 yd field goal

Second Quarter

- GOLD: Roberto Aguayo 56 yd field goal
- GARNET: Dalvin Cook 1 yd run (Roberto Aguayo kick)
- GARNET: Dalvin Cook 6 yd run (Roberto Aguayo kick)
- GOLD: Ermon Lane 42 yd pass from De'Andre Johnson (Roberto Aguayo kick)

Fourth Quarter

- GOLD: Jacques Patrick 11 yd run (Roberto Aguayo kick)
- GOLD: Mavin Saunders 17 yd pass from De'Andre Johnson (Ryan Feely kick)

Top Passers

- Garnet team – Sean Maguire; 22/44, 289 yards, 2 INT
- Gold team – J.J. Cosentino; 7/11, 177 yards, 1 TD

Top Rushers

- Garnet team – Mario Pender; 10 carries, 75 yards
- Gold team – Jacques Patrick; 16 carries, 83 yards, 1 TD

Top Receiving

- Garnet team – Jesus Wilson; 8 receptions, 114 yards
- Gold team – Mavin Saunders; 6 receptions, 91 yards, 1 TD

== Personnel ==
=== Coaching staff ===
Florida State Seminoles coaches

Head coach

- Jimbo Fisher

Assistant coaches

- Rick Trickett – Assistant head coach and offensive line coach
- Charles Kelly – Defensive coordinator and secondary coach
- Randy Sanders – Co-Offensive coordinator/quarterbacks coach
- Lawrence Dawsey – Co-Offensive coordinator/wide receivers coach
- Brad Lawing – Defensive head coach/defensive ends coach
- Odell Haggins – Associate coach/defensive line coach
- Jay Graham – Running backs coach/special teams coordinator
- Tim Brewster – Tight ends coach/recruiting coordinator
- Bill Miller – Linebackers coach
- Vic viloria – Head strength and conditioning coach

Support staff

- Addison Lynch
- Kurt Kennedy
- Jeremiah Wilson
- Brian Williams
- Jamie Mujeni
- Bert Biffani
- David Spurlock
- Matt McCutchan
- Andrew Priest
- Mike Warren
- Mario Edwards Sr.

=== Roster ===
Freshman quarterback De'Andre Johnson was dismissed from the team after being charged with a misdemeanor.

2015 Florida State Seminoles
Quarterback: 6 Everett Golson – (redshirt) senior (6'0, 199); 10 Sean Maguire – (redshirt) junior (6'3, 221); 12 Deondre Francois – freshman (6'1, 203); 16 J.J. Cosentino – (redshirt) freshman (6'4, 239); Running back: 4 Dalvin Cook – sophomore (5'11, 202); 7 Mario Pender – (redshirt) junior (5'10, 196); 9 Jacques Patrick – freshman (6'2, 235); 23 Freddie Stevenson – junior (6'1, 241) (FB); 26 Jonathan Vickers – sophomore (6'1, 226); Wide receiver: 1 Ermon Lane – sophomore (6'3, 205); 3 Jesus Wilson – junior (5'10, 185); 5 Da'Vante Phillips – freshman (6'1, 210); 8 Kermit Whitfield – junior (5'8, 184); 11 George Campbell – freshman (6'4, 202); 13 Ja'Vonn Harrison – sophomore (6'2, 202); 15 Travis Rudolph – sophomore (6'1, 186); 18 Auden Tate – freshman (6'5, 216); 80 Nyqwan Murray – freshman (5'11, 171); 87 Jared Jackson – (redshirt) sophomore (6'2, 196); Tight end: 81 Ryan Izzo – (redshirt) freshman (6'5, 241); 83 Jalen Wilkerson – freshman (6'4, 253); 85 Jeremy Kerr – (redshirt) sophomore (6'6, 266); 88 Mavin Saunders – (redshirt) freshman (6'5, 248)	Offensive line: 52 David Robbins – freshman (6'4, 322); 54 Alec Eberle – (redshirt) freshman (6'4, 294); 55 Chad Mavety – (redshirt) junior (6'5, 337); 57 Corey Martinez – (redshirt) freshman (6'4, 295); 59 Ryan Hoefield – (redshirt) sophomore (6'2, 299); 62 Ethan Frith – freshman (6'7, 299); 70 Cole Minshew – freshman (6'5, 340); 71 Brock Ruble – (redshirt) freshman (6'8, 307); 72 Kareem Are – (redshirt) junior (6'6, 334); 74 Derrick Kelly Jr. – (redshirt) freshman (6'5, 312); 75 Abdul Bello – freshman (6'6. 307); 77 Roderick Johnson – sophomore (6'7, 323); 78 Wilson Bell – (redshirt) sophomore (6'5, 316); Defensive line: 4 Giorgio Newberry – (redshirt) senior (6'6, 295); 9 Josh Sweat – freshman (6'5, 237); 11 Derrick Mitchell – (redshirt) senior (6'4, 305); 12 Arthur Williams – (redshirt) freshman (6'4, 318); 21 Chris Casher – (redshirt) junior (6'4, 256); 41 Lorenzo Featherston – sophomore (6'7, 229); 44 DeMarcus Walker – junior (6'3, 281); 55 Fredrick Jones – (redshirt) freshman (6'2, 304); 67 Adam Torres – (redshirt) freshman (6'4, 285); 86 Darvin Taylor – freshman (6'3, 308); 90 Demarcus Christmas – (redshirt) freshman (6'3, 301); 91 Derrick Nnadi – sophomore (6'1, 301); 92 Justin Shanks – (redshirt) junior (6'2 322); 95 Keith Bryant – (redshirt) sophomore (6'2, 294); 98 Rick Leonard – sophomore (6'7, 281); 99 Nile Lawrence-Stample – (redshirt) senior (6'1, 302)	Linebacker: 5 Reggie Northrup – senior (6'1, 231); 6 Matthew Thomas – (redshirt) sophomore (6'3, 225); 16 Jacob Pugh – sophomore (6'4, 239); 18 Ro'Derrick Hoskins – (redshirt) sophomore (6'2, 238); 22 Tyrell Lyons – (redshirt) sophomore (6'1, 219); 24 Terrance Smith – (redshirt) senior (6'4, 230); 30 Sh'Mar Kilby-Lane – freshman (6'1, 212); 35 Lorenzo Phillips – junior (6'2, 225); 45 Delvin Purifoy – (redshirt) freshman (6'2, 257); Defensive back: 1 Tyler Hunter – (redshirt) senior (5'11, 198); 3 Derwin James – freshman (6'3, 212); 7 Ryan Green – junior (5'11, 201); 8 Jalen Ramsey – junior (6'1, 202); 10 Calvin Brewton – freshman (6'0, 178); 13 Marcus Lewis – freshman (6'1, 192); 14 Javien Elliott – (redshirt) senior (5'11, 176); 15 Tarvarus McFadden – freshman (6'2, 197); 19 A.J. Westbrook – freshman (6'0, 184); 20 Trey Marshall – sophomore (6'0, 207); 27 Marquez White – (redshirt) sophomore (6'0, 184); 28 Malique Jackson – sophomore (6'0, 176); 29 Nate Andrews – junior (6'0, 206); 37 Keelin Smith – Senior (6'3, 190); 42 Lamarcus Brutus – (redshirt) senior (6'0, 207); Special teams: 19 Roberto Aguayo – (redshirt) junior (6'1, 204) (K); 38 Cason Beatty – senior (6'3, 215) (P) (H); 47 Stephen Gabbard – sophomore (6'3, 217) (LS)

==== Depth chart ====
(Depth Chart Notations: Name, Year at FSU/total years of eligibility, Games started in 2014)

Defense

STAR
Trey Marshall, 2/4, 0/11
Tyler Hunter, 5/5, 14/14
⋅

FS
Nate Andrews, 3/4, 13/14
Derwin James, 1/4, N/A
⋅

WILL	MIKE	BUCK
Terrance Smith, 5/5, 10/12	Reggie Northrup, 4/4, 14/14	Jacob Pugh, 2/4, 0/13
⋅	Tyrell Lyons, 3/5, 0/11	Lorenzo Featherston, 2/4, 3/11
⋅	Lorenzo Phillips, 1/2, N/A	Josh Sweat, 1/4, N/A

SS
Lamarcus Brutus, 5/5, 0/14
Trey Marshall, 2/4, 0/11
⋅

CB
Marquez White, 3/4, 0/12
Ryan Green, 3/4, 0/7
Tarvarus McFadden, 1/4, N/A

DE	NT	DE
DeMarcus Walker, 3/4, 11/14	Derrick Nnadi, 2/4, 0/9	Nile Lawrence-Stample, 5/5, 2/4
Rick Leonard, 2/4, 0/4	Demarcus Christmas, 2/5, 0/2	Derrick Mitchell, Jr., 5/5, 10/12
⋅	⋅	⋅

CB
Jalen Ramsey, 3/4, 14/14
Malique Jackson, 2/4, 0/3
Marcus Lewis, 1/4, N/A

Offense

WR
Travis Rudolph, 2/4, 6/13
Ja'Vonn "Pigg" Harrison, 2/4, 0/6
Da’Vante Phillips, 1/4, N/A

WR
Jesus Wilson, 3/4, 7/13
Kermit Whitfield, 3/4, 0/14
⋅

LT	LG	C	RG	RT
Roderick Johnson, 2/4, 5/8	Kareem Are, 2/3, N/A	Alec Eberle, 2/5, N/A or Corey Martinez, 2/5, N/A	Wilson Bell, 3/5, 0/2	Derrick Kelly, 2/5, N/A
Ethan Frith, 1/4, N/A	Cole Minshew, 1/4, N/A	Cole Minshew, 1/4, N/A	Keith Weeks, 4/5, 0/14	Chad Mavety, 2/3, N/A
Abdul Bello, 1/4, N/A	⋅	Ryan Hoefield, 3/5, 4/7	David Robbins, 1/4, N/A	Brock Ruble, 2/5, N/A

TE
Mavin Saunders, 2/5, N/A
Ryan Izzo, 2/5, N/A
Jeremy Kerr, 3/5, 0/14

WR
Ermon Lane, 2/4, 2/14
George Campbell, 1/4, NA
⋅

QB
Everett Golson, 1/5, N/A
Sean Maguire, 4/5, 1/4
J.J. Cosentino, 2/5, N/A, PA
Deondre Francois, 1/4, N/A

Special teams
PK Roberto Aguayo, 4/5, 14/14
P Cason Beatty, 4/4, 14/14
KR Kermit Whitfield, 3/4, 0/14
Jalen Ramsey, 3/4, 14/14
PR Jesus Wilson, 3/4, 7/13
Marquez White, 3/4, 0/12

RB
Mario Pender, 4/5, 1/9
Johnathan Vickers, 2/4, 0/13
Jacques Patrick, 1/4, N/A
Dalvin Cook, 2/4, 3/13

== Statistics ==
=== Scores by quarter (all opponents) ===
	1	2	3	4	Total
Florida State	93	90	113	116	412
All opponents	53	65	24	85	227

=== Scores by quarter (ACC opponents) ===
	1	2	3	4	Total
Florida State	62	56	52	47	217
ACC opponents	43	31	24	46	144

== Rankings ==
Ranking movements Legend: ██ Increase in ranking ██ Decrease in ranking
	Week															
Poll	Pre	1	2	3	4	5	6	7	8	9	10	11	12	13	14	Final
AP	10	11	9	10	11	12	11	9	17	17	19	16	14	10	9	14
Coaches	8	8	6	7	9	8	8	9	15	15	18	16	14	9	8	14
CFP	Not released									16	16	14	13	9	9	Not released

== Season ==
Florida State was picked to finish second in the ACC Atlantic. Roberto Aguayo, Roderick Johnson, Jalen Ramsey, and Terrance Smith were named to the preseason All-ACC team.

=== Schedule ===
Date	Time	Opponent	Rank	Site	TV	Result	Attendance
September 5	9:00 p.m.	Texas State*	No. 10	Doak Campbell Stadium; Tallahassee, FL	ESPNews	W 59–16	80,917
September 12	11:30 a.m.	South Florida*	No. 11	Doak Campbell Stadium; Tallahassee, FL	ESPN	W 34–14	72,811
September 18	8:00 p.m.	at Boston College	No. 9	Alumni Stadium; Chestnut Hill, MA	ESPN	W 14–0	39,111
October 3	3:30 p.m.	at Wake Forest	No. 11	BB&T Field; Winston-Salem, NC	ESPN	W 24–16	28,588
October 10	8:00 p.m.	Miami (FL)	No. 12	Doak Campbell Stadium; Tallahassee, FL (rivalry)	ABC	W 29–24	82,329
October 17	12:00 p.m.	Louisville	No. 11	Doak Campbell Stadium; Tallahassee, FL	ESPN	W 41–21	71,225
October 24	7:00 p.m.	at Georgia Tech	No. 9	Bobby Dodd Stadium; Atlanta, GA	ESPN2	L 16–22	55,000
October 31	12:00 p.m.	Syracuse	No. 17	Doak Campbell Stadium; Tallahassee, FL	ABC	W 45–21	67,630
November 7	3:30 p.m.	at No. 1 Clemson	No. 16	Memorial Stadium, Clemson; Clemson, SC (rivalry)	ABC	L 13–23	83,099
November 14	12:30 p.m.	NC State^{†}	No. 16	Doak Campbell Stadium; Tallahassee, FL	ACCN	W 34–17	71,210
November 21	3:00 p.m.	No. 9 (FCS) Chattanooga*	No. 14	Doak Campbell Stadium; Tallahassee, FL	ACCRSN	W 52–13	66,412
November 28	7:30 p.m.	at No. 12 Florida*	No. 13	Ben Hill Griffin Stadium; Gainesville, FL (rivalry)	ESPN	W 27–2	90,916
December 31	12:00 p.m.	vs. No. 18 Houston*	No. 9	Georgia Dome; Atlanta, GA (Peach Bowl)	ESPN	L 24–38	71,007
*Non-conference game; ^{†}Homecoming; Rankings from AP Poll and CFP Rankings after November 3 released prior to game; All times are in Eastern time

=== Game summaries ===
==== Texas State ====
Texas State vs. Florida State

Quarter	1	2	3	4	Total
Bobcats	0	10	0	6	16
#10 Seminoles	14	7	14	24	59

at Doak Campbell Stadium, Tallahassee, Florida

- Date: September 5
- Game time: 9:05 p.m. EST
- Game weather: Temperature: 78 °F (26 °C) • Wind E 5 mph (8.0 km/h) • Weather: Light Rain
- Game attendance: 80,917
- Referee: Pat Garvey
- TV announcers (ESPNews): Dave LaMont (play-by-play), Ray Bentley (analyst), Dawn Davenport (sideline reporter)

Game information

First Quarter

- FSU: Dalvin Cook 1 yd run TEX ST 0 FSU 7
- FSU: Dalvin Cook 28 yd run TEX ST 0 FSU 14

Second Quarter

- TEX ST: James Sherman 26 yd field goal TEX ST 3 FSU 14
- TEX ST: Chris Nutall 4 yd run TEX ST 10 FSU 14
- FSU: Mario Pender 1 yd run TEX ST

Third Quarter

- FSU: Travis Rudolph 5 yd pass from Everett Golson
- FSU: Ryan Izzo 13 yd pass from Everett Golson

Fourth Quarter

- FSU: Jesus Wilson 14 yd pass from Everett Golson
- FSU: Ja'Vonn Harrison 55 yd pass from Everett Golson
- TEX ST: Chris French 4 yd pass from Connor White
- FSU: Jonathan Vickers 24 yd pass from Sean Maguire
- FSU: Roberto Aguayo 22 yd field goal

Top Passers

- Texas state – Tyler Jones; 16/25, 100 yards
- Florida state – Everett Golson; 19/25, 302 yards, 4 TD

Top Rushers

- Texas state – Tyler Jones; 10 carries, 39 yards
- Florida state – Dalvin Cook; 19 carries, 156 yards, 2 TD

Top Receiving

- Texas state – C.J. Best; 6 receptions, 43 yards
- Florida state – Ja'Vonn Harrison; 2 receptions, 77 yards, 1 TD

==== South Florida ====
South Florida vs. Florida State

Quarter	1	2	3	4	Total
Bulls	0	7	0	7	14
#11 Seminoles	7	0	17	10	34

at Doak Campbell Stadium, Tallahassee, Florida

- Date: September 12
- Game time: 11:31 a.m. EST
- Game weather: Temperature: 73 °F (23 °C) • Wind: Calm • Weather: Light Rain
- Game attendance: 72,811
- Referee: Tracy Jones
- TV announcers (ESPN): Bob Wischusen (play-by-play), Brock Huard (analyst), Shannon Spake (sideline reporter)

Game information

First Quarter

- FSU: Dalvin Cook 74 yd run

Second Quarter

- USF: D'Ernest Johnson 1 yd pass from Quinton Flowers

Third Quarter

- FSU: Dalvin Cook 24 yd run
- FSU: Roberto Aguayo 30 yd field goal
- FSU: Jesus Wilson 23 yd pass from Everett Golson

Fourth Quarter

- USF: D'Ernest Johnson 71 yd pass from Quinton Flowers
- FSU: Roberto Aguayo 38 yd field goal
- FSU: Dalvin Cook 37 yd run

Top Passers

- South florida – Quinton Flowers; 12/24, 125 yards, 2 TD, 1 INT
- Florida state – Everett Golson; 14/26, 163 yards, 1 TD

Top Rushers

- South florida – Marlon Mack; 18 carries, 83 yards
- Florida state – Dalvin Cook; 30 carries, 266 yards, 3 TD

Top Receiving

- South florida – D'Ernest Johnson; 5 receptions, 89 yards, 2 TD
- Florida state – Travis Rudolph; 6 receptions, 55 yards

==== Boston College ====
Florida State vs. Boston College

Quarter	1	2	3	4	Total
#9 Seminoles	7	0	0	7	14
Eagles	0	0	0	0	0

at Alumni Stadium, Chestnut Hill, Massachusetts

- Date: September 18
- Game time: 8:02 p.m. EST
- Game weather: Temperature: 73 °F (23 °C) • Wind SSW 7 mph (11 km/h) • Weather: clear
- Game attendance: 39,111
- Referee: Ron Cherry
- TV announcers (ESPN): Dave Flemming (play-by-play), Mack Brown (analyst), Allison Williams (sideline reporter)

Game information

First Quarter

- FSU: Travis Rudolph 9 yd pass from Everett Golson

Fourth Quarter

- FSU: Jalen Ramsey 36 yd fumble return

Top Passers

- Florida state – Everett Golson; 15/24, 119 yards, 1 TD
- Boston college – Darius Wade; 4/12, 47 yards, 1 INT

Top Rushers

- Florida state – Dalvin Cook; 15 carries, 54 yards
- Boston college – Myles Willis; 8 carries, 40 yards

Top Receiving

- Florida state – Kermit Whitfield; 4 receptions, 52 yards
- Boston college – Bobby Wolford; 2 receptions, 26 yards

==== Wake Forest ====
Florida State vs. Wake Forest

Quarter	1	2	3	4	Total
#11 Seminoles	7	7	10	0	24
Demon Deacons	3	7	0	6	16

at BB&T Field, Winston-Salem, North Carolina

- Date: October 3
- Game time: 3:35 p.m. EST
- Game weather: Temperature: 56 °F (13 °C) • Wind NE 7 mph (11 km/h) • Weather: Rain
- Game attendance: 28,588
- Referee: Penn Wagers
- TV announcers (ESPN): Mark Neely (play-by-play), David Diaz-Infante (analyst), Dawn Davenport (sideline reporter)

Game information

First Quarter

- FSU: Dalvin Cook 94 yd run

Second Quarter

- FSU: Jonathan Vickers 9 yd run

WF: Cam Serigne 7 yd pass from Kendall Hinton
Third Quarter

- FSU: Kermit Whitfield 5 yd pass from Everett Golson
- FSU: Roberto Aguayo 25 yd field goal

Fourth Quarter

- WF: Mike Weaver 34 yd field goal
- WF: Mike Weaver 29 yd field goal

Top Passers

- Florida state – Everett Golson; 20/31, 202 yards, 1 TD
- Wake forest – Kendall Hinton; 27/42, 215 yards, 1 TD, 1 INT

Top Rushers

- Florida state – Dalvin Cook; 2 carries, 94 yards, 1 TD
- Wake forest – Matt Colburn; 11 carries, 51 yards

Top Receiving

- Florida state – Jesus Wilson; 5 receptions, 77 yards
- Wake forest – Cam Serigne; 10 receptions, 83 yards, 1 TD

==== Miami (FL) ====
Miami vs. Florida State

Quarter	1	2	3	4	Total
Hurricanes	3	7	7	7	24
#12 Seminoles	14	6	0	9	29

at Doak Campbell Stadium, Tallahassee, Florida

- Date: October 10
- Game time: 8:14 p.m. EST
- Game weather: Temperature: 81 °F (27 °C) • Wind NNW 9 mph (14 km/h) • Weather: Cloudy
- Game attendance: 82,329
- Referee: Jeff Flanagan
- TV announcers (ABC): Chris Fowler (play-by-play), Kirk Herbstreit (analyst), Heather Cox (sideline reporter)

Game information

First Quarter

- FSU: Dalvin Cook 72 yd run
- MIA: Michael Badgley 30 yd field goal
- FSU: Dalvin Cook 36 yd pass from Everett Golson

Second Quarter

- FSU: Roberto Aguayo 22 yd field goal
- MIA: Rashawn Scott 58 yd pass from Brad Kaaya
- FSU: Roberto Aguayo 32 yd field goal

Third Quarter

- MIA: Joseph Yearby 1 yd pass from Brad Kaaya

Fourth Quarter

- FSU: Roberto Aguayo 25 yd field goal
- MIA: Stacy Coley 29 yd pass from Brad Kaaya
- FSU: Dalvin Cook 23 yd run

Top Passers

- Miami – Brad Kaaya; 29/49, 405 yards, 3 TD
- Florida state – Everett Golson; 25/33, 291 yards, 1 TD

Top Rushers

- Miami – Joseph Yearby; 15 carries, 33 yards
- Florida state – Dalvin Cook; 22 carries, 222 yards, 2 TD

Top Receiving

- Miami – Stacy Coley; 7 receptions, 139 yards, 1 TD
- Florida state – Kermit Whitfield; 9 receptions, 95 yards

==== Louisville ====
Louisville vs. Florida State

Quarter	1	2	3	4	Total
Cardinals	7	0	7	7	21
#11 Seminoles	3	3	21	14	41

at Doak Campbell Stadium, Tallahassee, Florida

- Date: October 17
- Game time: 12:02 p.m. EST
- Game weather: Temperature: 71 °F (22 °C) • Wind NNW 9 mph (14 km/h) • Weather: clear
- Game attendance: 71,225
- Referee: Jerry Magallanes
- TV announcers (ESPN): Bob Wischusen (play-by-play), Brock Huard (analyst), Shannon Spake (sideline reporter)

Game information

First Quarter

- FSU: Roberto Aguayo 43 yd field goal
- LOU: James Quick 18 yd pass from Lamar Jackson

Second Quarter

- FSU: Roberto Aguayo 32 yd field goal

Third Quarter

- FSU: Dalvin Cook 54 yd run
- LOU: James Quick 19 yd pass from Lamar Jackson
- FSU: Kermit Whitfield 70 yd pass from Everett Golson
- FSU: Dalvin Cook 14 yd run

Fourth Quarter

- FSU: Travis Rudolph 13 yd pass from Everett Golson
- LOU: James Quick 39 yd pass from Lamar Jackson
- FSU: Ryan Izzo 2 yd pass from Everett Golson

Top Passers

- Louisville – Lamar Jackson; 20/35, 307 yards, 3 TD, 1 INT
- Florida state – Everett Golson; 26/38, 372 yards, 3 TD

Top Rushers

- Louisville – Lamar Jackson; 19 carries, 32 yards
- Florida state – Dalvin Cook; 22 carries, 163 yards, 2 TD

Top Receiving

- Louisville – James Quick; 5 receptions, 130 yards, 3 TD
- Florida state – Kermit Whitfield; 9 receptions, 172 yards, 1 TD

==== Georgia Tech ====
Florida State vs. Georgia Tech

Quarter	1	2	3	4	Total
#9 Seminoles	3	13	0	0	16
Yellow Jackets	3	7	3	9	22

at Bobby Dodd Stadium, Atlanta

- Date: October 24
- Game time: 7:05 p.m. EST
- Game weather: Temperature: 67 °F (19 °C) • Wind ESE 4 mph (6.4 km/h) • Weather: Partly Cloudy
- Game attendance: 55,000
- Referee: Jeff Heaser
- TV announcers (ESPN2): Mark Jones (play-by-play), Rod Gilmore (analyst), Quint Kessenich (sideline reporter)

Game information

First Quarter

- FSU: Roberto Aguayo 20 yd field goal
- GT: Harrison Butker 53 yd field goal

Second Quarter

- FSU: Dalvin Cook 2 yd run
- FSU: Roberto Aguayo 27 yd field goal
- GT: Justin Thomas 60 yd run
- FSU: Roberto Aguayo 38 yd field goal

Third Quarter

- GT: Harrison Butker 40 yd field goal

Fourth Quarter

- GT: Harrison Butker 35 yd field goal
- GT: Lance Austin 78 yd return

Top Passers

- Florida state – Everett Golson; 20/30, 210 yards, 1 INT
- Georgia tech – Justin Thomas; 4/10, 67 yards, 2 INT

Top Rushers

- Florida state – Dalvin Cook; 17 carries, 82 yards, 1 TD
- Georgia tech – Justin Thomas; 13 carries, 88 yards, 1 TD

Top Receiving

- Florida state – Kermit Whitfield; 6 receptions, 61 yards
- Georgia tech – Brad Stewart; 1 reception, 36 yards

==== Syracuse ====
Syracuse vs. Florida State

Quarter	1	2	3	4	Total
Orange	7	7	0	7	21
#17 Seminoles	14	14	7	10	45

at Doak Campbell Stadium, Tallahassee, Florida

- Date: October 31
- Game time: 12:05 p.m. EST
- Game weather: Temperature: 72 °F (22 °C) • Wind ESE 7 mph (11 km/h) • Weather: Cloudy
- Game attendance: 67,630
- Referee: Pat Garvey
- TV announcers (ABC): Sean McDonough (play-by-play), Chris Spielman (analyst), Todd McShay (sideline reporter)

Game information

First Quarter

- SYR: Eric Dungey 1 yd run
- FSU: Travis Rudolph 75 yd pass from Sean Maguire
- FSU: Travis Rudolph 45 yd pass from Sean Maguire

Second Quarter

- FSU: Jacques Patrick 2 yd run
- SYR: Eric Dungey 1 yd run
- FSU: Jacques Patrick 1 yd run

Third Quarter

- FSU: Travis Rudolph 19 yd pass from Sean Maguire

Fourth Quarter

- FSU: Jacques Patrick 28 yd run
- FSU: Roberto Aguayo 35 yd field goal
- SYR: Brisly Estime 59 yd punt return

Top Passers

- Syracuse – Eric Dungey; 11/24, 120 yards
- Florida state – Sean Maguire; 23/35, 348 yards, 3 TD

Top Rushers

- Syracuse – George Morris II; 6 carries, 55 yards
- Florida state – Jacques Patrick; 24 carries, 162 yards, 3 TD

Top Receiving

- Syracuse – Dontae Strickland; 1 reception, 62 yards
- Florida state – Travis Rudolph; 5 receptions, 191 yards, 3 TD

==== Clemson ====
Florida State vs. Clemson

Quarter	1	2	3	4	Total
#17 Seminoles	7	3	3	0	13
#3 Tigers	3	3	7	10	23

at Memorial Stadium, Clemson, South Carolina

- Date: November 7
- Game time: 3:40 p.m. EST
- Game weather: Temperature: 70 °F (21 °C) • Wind WNW 2–4 mph (3.2–6.4 km/h) • Weather: Cloudy
- Game attendance: 83,099
- Referee: Duane Heydt
- TV announcers (ABC): Chris Fowler (play-by-play), Kirk Herbstreit (analyst), Heather Cox (sideline reporter)

Game information

First Quarter

- FSU: Dalvin Cook 75 yd run
- CLEM: Greg Huegel 31 yd field goal

Second Quarter

- FSU: Roberto Aguayo 23 yd field goal
- CLEM: Greg Huegel 25 yd field goal

Third Quarter

- CLEM: Deon Cain 38 yd pass from Deshaun Watson
- FSU: Roberto Aguayo 41 yd field goal

Fourth Quarter

- CLEM: Greg Huegel 34 yd field goal
- CLEM: Wayne Gallman 25 yd run

Top Passers

- Florida state – Sean Maguire; 16/29, 164 yards, 1 INT
- Clemson – Deshaun Watson; 28/42, 297 yards, 1 TD

Top Rushers

- Florida state – Dalvin Cook; 21 carries, 194 yards, 1 TD
- Clemson – Deshaun Watson; 16 carries, 107 yards

Top Receiving

- Florida state – Travis Rudolph; 6 receptions, 86 yards
- Clemson – Jordan Leggett; 6 receptions, 101 yards

==== NC State ====
NC State vs. Florida State

Quarter	1	2	3	4	Total
Wolfpack	17	0	0	0	17
#19 Seminoles	7	10	10	7	34

at Doak Campbell Stadium, Tallahassee, Florida

- Date: November 14
- Game time: 12:32 p.m. EST
- Game weather: Temperature: 64 °F (18 °C) • Wind NE 9 mph (14 km/h) • Weather: clear
- Game attendance: 71,210
- Referee: Gary Patterson
- TV announcers (ACCN): Tim Brant (play-by-play), Dave Archer (analyst), Roddy Jones (sideline reporter)

Game information

First Quarter

- NC ST: Kyle Bambard 31 yd field goal
- FSU: Dalvin Cook 13 yd run
- NC ST: Jaylen Samuels 2 yd pass from Jacoby Brissett
- NC ST: Jacoby Brissett 2 yd run

Second Quarter

- FSU: Dalvin Cook 30 yd run
- FSU: Roberto Aguayo 40 yd field goal

Third Quarter

- FSU: Roberto Aguayo 26 yd field goal
- FSU: Kermit Whitfield 27 yd pass from Sean Maguire

Fourth Quarter

- FSU: Kermit Whitfield 45 yd pass from Sean Maguire

Top Passers

- NC state – Jacoby Brissett; 27/47, 209 yards, 1 TD
- Florida state – Sean Maguire; 18/28, 231 yards, 2 TD, 1 INT

Top Rushers

- NC state – Jacoby Brissett; 17 carries, 25 yards, 1 TD
- Florida state – Dalvin Cook; 22 carries, 138 yards, 2 TD

Top Receiving

- NC state – David Grinnage; 7 receptions, 63 yards
- Florida state – Kermit Whitfield; 6 receptions, 117 yards, 2 TD

==== Chattanooga ====
UT-Chattanooga vs. Florida State

Quarter	1	2	3	4	Total
#9 (FCS) Mocs	3	3	0	7	13
#16 Seminoles	7	17	21	7	52

at Doak Campbell Stadium, Tallahassee, Florida

- Date: November 21
- Game time: 3:04 p.m. EST
- Game weather: Temperature: 75 °F (24 °C) • Wind SSE 5 mph (8.0 km/h) • Weather: Cloudy
- Game attendance: 66,412
- Referee: Pat Garvey
- TV announcers (Fox Sun Sports): Wes Durham (play-by-play), James Bates (analyst), Hans Heiserer and Jenn Hildreth (sideline reporters)

Game information

First Quarter

- CHATT: Henrique Ribeiro 29 yd field goal
- FSU: Jacques Patrick 1 yd run

Second Quarter

- CHATT: Henrique Ribeiro 24 yd field goal
- FSU: Dalvin Cook 13 yd run
- FSU: Roberto Aguayo 18 yd field goal
- FSU: Kermit Whitfield 26 yd pass from Sean Maguire

Third Quarter

- FSU: Kermit Whitfield 13 yd pass from Sean Maguire
- FSU: Dalvin Cook 2 yd run
- FSU: Colton Plante 2 yd run

Fourth Quarter

- CHATT: Jacob Huesman 3 yd run
- FSU: Jacques Patrick 4 yd run

Top Passers

- Chattanooga – Jacob Huesman; 12/19, 94 yards, 1 INT
- Florida state – Sean Maguire; 12/17, 152 yards, 2 TD

Top Rushers

- Chattanooga – Derrick Craine; 12 carries, 36 yards
- Florida state – Dalvin Cook; 15 carries, 106 yards, 2 TD

Top Receiving

- Chattanooga – C.J. Board, James Stovall; 3 receptions, 29 yards
- Florida state – Kermit Whitfield; 5 receptions, 91 yards, 2 TD

==== Florida ====
Florida State vs. Florida

Quarter	1	2	3	4	Total
#14 Seminoles	0	10	3	14	27
#10 Gators	0	0	0	2	2

at Ben Hill Griffin Stadium, Gainesville, Florida

- Date: November 28
- Game time: 7:37 p.m. EST
- Game weather: Temperature: 68 °F (20 °C) • Wind ENE 5 mph (8.0 km/h) • Weather: Humid
- Game attendance: 90,916
- Referee: Hubert Owens
- TV announcers (ESPN): Mike Patrick (play-by-play), Ed Cunningham (analyst), Jerry Punch (sideline reporter)

Game information

Second Quarter

- FSU: Roberto Aguayo 45 yd field goal
- FSU: Jeremy Kerr 1 yd pass from Sean Maguire

Third Quarter

- FSU: Roberto Aguayo 51 yd field goal

Fourth Quarter

- UF: Safety
- FSU: Dalvin Cook 15 yd run
- FSU: Dalvin Cook 29 yd run

Top Passers

- Florida state – Sean Maguire; 14/28, 160 yards, 1 TD
- Florida – Treon Harris; 19/38, 134 yards

Top Rushers

- Florida state – Dalvin Cook; 26 carries, 183 yards, 2 TD
- Florida – Kelvin Taylor; 24 carries, 136 yards

Top Receiving

- Florida state – Kermit Whitfield; 2 receptions, 52 yards
- Florida – Jake McGee; 4 receptions, 34 yards

==== Peach Bowl: Houston ====
Houston vs. Florida State (Peach Bowl)

Quarter	1	2	3	4	Total
#14 Cougars	7	14	0	17	38
#9 Seminoles	3	0	7	14	24

at Georgia Dome, Atlanta, Georgia

- Date: December 31
- Game time: 12:05 p.m. EST
- Game weather: Indoor
- Game attendance: 71,007
- Referee: Tom Ritter
- TV announcers (ESPN): Dave Pasch (play-by-play), Brian Griese (analyst), Tom Luginbill (field analyst)
  ESPN Radio: Dave Flemming (play-by-play), Mike Bellotti (analyst), Allison Williams (sideline reporter)

Game information

First Quarter

- UH: Greg Ward Jr. 7 yd run
- FSU: Roberto Aguayo 20 yd field goal

Second Quarter

- UH: Chance Allen 20 yd pass from Demarcus Ayers
- UH: Greg Ward Jr. 6 yd run

Third Quarter

- FSU: Dalvin Cook 1 yd run

Fourth Quarter

- UH: Ty Cummings 39 yd field goal
- FSU: Travis Rudolph 65 yd pass from Sean Maguire
- UH: Chance Allen 17 yd pass from Greg Ward Jr.
- FSU: Jesus Wilson 14 yd pass from Sean Maguire
- UH: Ryan Jackson 2 yd run

Top Passers

- Houston – Greg Ward, Jr.; 25/41, 238 yards, 1 TD, 1 INT
- Florida state – Sean Maguire; 22/44, 392 yards, 2 TD, 4 INT

Top Rushers

- Houston – Greg Ward, Jr.; 20 carries, 67 yards, 2 TD
- Florida state – Dalvin Cook; 18 carries, 33 yards, 1 TD

Top Receiving

- Houston – Demarcus Ayers; 9 receptions, 82 yards
- Florida state – Travis Rudolph; 7 receptions, 201 yards, 1 TD

== Awards ==
- Jacobs Blocking Trophy

Roderick Johnson

- Jim Brown Award

Dalvin Cook

=== Watchlists ===
Players

- Johnny Unitas Award

Everett Golson

- Lott Trophy

Jalen Ramsey

- Maxwell Award

Dalvin Cook
Everett Golson

- Bednarik Award

Jalen Ramsey
Terrance Smith

- Lou Groza Award

Roberto Aguayo

- Outland Trophy

Roderick Johnson

- Nagurski Award

Jalen Ramsey
Terrance Smith

- Jim Thorpe Award

Jalen Ramsey

- Lombardi Award

Reggie Northrup
Terrance Smith
Roderick Johnson

- Butkus Award

Reggie Northrup
Terrance Smith

- Walter Camp Award

Everett Golson

- Wuerffel Trophy

Roberto Aguayo

- Doak Walker Award

Dalvin Cook

- Ray Guy Award

Cason Beatty

Coaches

- Dodd Trophy

Jimbo Fisher

- Bear Bryant Award

Jimbo Fisher

Pre-season All-Americans

- Roberto Aguayo (Lindy's, Athlon, Phil Steele, Sporting News, CBS Sports, ESPN, Sports Illustrated)
- Jalen Ramsey (Lindy's, Athlon, Phil Steele, Sporting News, Sports Illustrated)
- Dalvin Cook (Athlon)
- Terrance Smith (Phil Steele)

=== Finalists ===
Players

- Burlsworth Trophy

Javien Elliott

Coaches

- Broyles Award

Charles Kelly

Quarterfinalists

- Wuerffel Trophy

Cason Beatty

- Lott Trophy

Jalen Ramsey

Semifinalists

- Jim Thorpe Award

Jalen Ramsey

- Maxwell Award

Dalvin Cook

- Bednarik Award

Jalen Ramsey

- Lou Groza Award

Roberto Aguayo

- Lott Trophy

Jalen Ramsey

- Doak Walker Award

Dalvin Cook

- Walter Camp Award

Dalvin Cook

=== Honors ===
- ACC Player of the Week
  - Everett Golson (offensive back)
  - Dalvin Cook (offensive back)
  - Roderick Johnson (offensive lineman)
  - Jalen Ramsey (defensive back)
  - Roberto Aguayo (Specialist)
  - Terrance Smith (Linebacker)
  - Trey Marshall (defensive back)
  - DeMarcus Walker (defensive lineman)
  - Kermit Whitfield (Receiver)
  - Jacob Pugh (Linebacker)
  - Travis Rudolph (Receiver)
  - Jacques Patrick (rookie)
  - Derwin James (defensive back)
  - DeMarcus Walker (defensive lineman)

In addition to conference honors, Dalvin Cook has been recognized by the Walter Camp Foundation and the Football Writers Association.

==== All-ACC ====
Name	Selection
Roderick Johnson*	First Team (Offense)
Dalvin Cook*†	First Team (Offense)
Roberto Aguayo*	First Team (Offense)
Jalen Ramsey*	First Team (Defense)
Travis Rudolph*	Second Team/Honorable Mention (Offense)
Kermit Whitfield*	Second Team (Offense)
DeMarcus Walker*	Second Team/Third Team (Defense)
Nile Lawrence-Stample*	Second Team/First Team (Defense)
Reggie Northrup*	Second Team (Defense)
Kareem Are*	Third Team/Honorable Mention (Offense)
Derrick Nnadi	Third Team (Defense)
Derwin James	Third Team (Defense)
Chad Mavety	Honorable Mention (Offense)
Terrance Smith	Honorable Mention (Defense)
Lamarcus Brutus	Honorable Mention (Defense)
Kermit Whitfield*	Honorable Mention/Third Team (special teams)
Cason Beatty	Honorable Mention (special teams)
†denotes unanimous selection *indicates selection by media and coaches

=== All-Americans ===
Jalen Ramsey was named a consensus All-American.

Name	AP	AFCA	FWAA	TSN	WCFF	USA Today	Athlon	CBS	ESPN	SI
Roderick Johnson				2nd		2nd				Hon. Mention
Dalvin Cook	2nd		1st	2nd	2nd		1st	2nd		1st
Jalen Ramsey	2nd	1st	2nd	2nd	1st	2nd	1st	2nd	1st	2nd
Derwin James				Fresh.		Fresh.			Fresh.	Hon. Mention
Roberto Aguayo				1st		2nd		1st		Hon. Mention
†denotes unanimous selection. NCAA recognizes a selection to all five of the AP, AFCA, FWAA, SN and WCFF 1st teams for unanimous selections and three of five for consensus selections.

=== All-Star games ===
Game	Date	Site	Players
1st Tropic Bowl	January 17, 2016	North Miami Stadium, North Miami, Florida	Lamarcus Brutus, Giorgio Newberry
5th NFLPA Collegiate Bowl	January 23, 2016	StubHub Center, Carson, California	Reggie Northrup
91st East–West Shrine Game	January 23, 2016	Tropicana Field, St. Petersburg, Florida	Terrance Smith, Nile Lawrence-Stample
18th All-Star Football Challenge	February 5, 2016	AT&T Stadium, Dallas, Texas	Roberto Aguayo, Jalen Ramsey

== NFL draft ==
The following players were selected in the 2016 NFL draft:

Round	Pick	Overall	Name	Position	Team
1st	5th	5th	Jalen Ramsey	Cornerback	Jacksonville Jaguars
2nd	28th	59th	Roberto Aguayo	Kicker	Tampa Bay Buccaneers

The following players signed as undrafted free agents:

Name	Position	Team
Lamarcus Brutus	Safety	Tennessee Titans
Javien Elliott	Defensive back	Pittsburgh Steelers
Nile Lawrence-Stample	Defensive tackle	Cleveland Browns
Giorgio Newberry	Defensive lineman	Pittsburgh Steelers
Reggie Northrup	Linebacker	Washington Redskins
Terrance Smith	Linebacker	Kansas City Chiefs

Everett Golson joined the practice squad of the Hamilton Tiger-Cats in the Canadian Football League.
