= Everett Golson =

American football player (born 1993)

No. 5, 6, 13
- Position: Quarterback

Personal information
- Born: January 2, 1993 (age 33); Myrtle Beach, South Carolina, U.S.
- Listed height: 6 ft 0 in (1.83 m)
- Listed weight: 199 lb (90 kg)

Career information
- High school: Myrtle Beach
- College: Notre Dame (2011–2012, 2014); Florida State (2015)

Career history
- 2016–2017: Hamilton Tiger-Cats

Awards and highlights
- First-team All-Independent (2012)
- Stats at CFL.ca

Everett Demone Golson (born January 2, 1993) is an American former professional football player who was a quarterback for the Hamilton Tiger-Cats of the Canadian Football League (CFL). He played college football for the Notre Dame Fighting Irish from 2011 to the spring of 2015. Golson chose to transfer to the Florida State Seminoles after graduating from Notre Dame.

== Early life ==
Golson was born to Sherwin "Wayne" and Cynthia Golson and grew up in Myrtle Beach, South Carolina. At Myrtle Beach High School, Golson threw 151 career touchdown passes for the football team, leading them to the AAA state titles in both 2008 and 2010. In addition, he helped lead the basketball team to a state championship in 2008 as a point guard and was named to the all-state team.

Golson originally committed to North Carolina before changing his college choice to Notre Dame.

== College career ==
=== 2011 season ===
During the 2011 season, Golson was redshirted as sophomore quarterback Tommy Rees led the Notre Dame Fighting Irish to an 8–5 record.

=== 2012 season ===
During the 2012 season, Golson guided the Fighting Irish to the National Title game against the Alabama Crimson Tide.

=== Academic suspension from Notre Dame ===
In May 2013, it was reported that Golson was suspended from Notre Dame because of an academic violation and other reasons. Initially, Notre Dame's assistant vice president for public information and communications said in an email: "Everett is not enrolled at Notre Dame. Federal law and our own policies preclude us from discussing specifics."

After having sat out the entire 2013 season, Golson was readmitted to Notre Dame on December 13, 2013. He was not allowed to practice or travel with the team for the Pinstripe Bowl. In a conversation with Andy Staples of Sports Illustrated, Golson admitted to cheating on a test as the reason for his academic suspension.

=== 2014 season ===
The 2014 Fighting Irish began the year at 6–0 ranked No. 5 in the country by October 12. This fast start included victories over Rice (49–17), Michigan (31–0), Purdue (30–14), and Syracuse (31–15)—all in September.

Notre Dame ended the season with an 8–5 record.

In Notre Dame's October 4 matchup with No. 14 Stanford, the team prevailed after a 23-yard touchdown pass by Everett Golson to Ben Koyack on 4th down-and-11 with only 1:01 left in the game. Golson was 20-of-43 for 241 passing yards and a couple of scores that day.

Later, Notre Dame won a 50–43 shootout win over North Carolina (October 11) and lost to then-#2 ranked Florida State, 31–27, on October 18.

Afterwards, Notre Dame went 1–4 that month, culminating in a blowout loss to rival USC in which the Golson was benched early in favor of his backup Malik Zaire. Closing out the season in a bowl game, Golson's teammate Malik Zaire was named the starter in a time-splitting arrangement as the Irish defeated SEC powerhouse LSU (finished 8–5 in 2014) in the Franklin American Mortgage Music City Bowl in a close one, 31–28. Golson was 6 of 11 for 90 yards passing in the bowl game, while Zaire threw for 96 yards and rushed for 96 more to defeat Les Miles's Tigers.

He opened the 2014 season against Rice on August 30 by throwing for 295 yards (14 of 22 passing attempts) and for two touchdowns. The next weekend, he went 23-of-34 for 226 passing yards and 3 touchdowns versus the Michigan Wolverines. On September 13, Golson threw for 259 yards and 2 scores while leading the team in rushing with 56 yards against Purdue on the road.

Against Syracuse on September 27, Golson set a Notre Dame school record by completing 25 consecutive passes, one shy of tying the NCAA record. He threw for 362 yards and 4 touchdowns off 32-of-39 passing attempts against the Orangemen.

In Notre Dame's loss to Florida State (finished 13–1, ranked No. 5 in 2014), Golson finished the evening with 313 passing yards (31 of 52 passing attempts) and 3 scores in a game in which he received much praise from his coach, Coach Brian Kelly. "He was terrific," Kelly explained following a road matchup that involved much controversy over the officiating at the game's conclusion.

Other big games for Golson that year included a 315-yard passing effort at Navy as he finished 18 of 25 for 3 touchdowns on November 1 in a 49–39 win over the Midshipmen. He also had a big day on November 15 in a 43–40 overtime loss to Northwestern running with and throwing the football. Golson broke off on a 61-yard touchdown run out of the shotgun on the 4th play of the game. He finished with 10 rushes for 78 yards while going 21 of 40 passing the ball for 287 yards and 3 touchdowns against the Wildcats.

Golson fumbled 8 times and threw 14 interceptions, 4 of which were returned for defensive touchdowns. Not all of the blame was on Golson, however, as the Irish defense suffered multiple injuries at key positions early in the season and never recovered.

=== 2015 season ===
==== Transfer from Notre Dame to Florida State ====
On May 7, as many expected following his lackluster finish to 2014, Golson announced his intent to transfer from Notre Dame. Golson provided roughly 10 schools to the Notre Dame compliance office as to where he was interested in transferring. Among the schools on Golson's initial wish list were Florida State, Alabama, South Carolina, and UCLA. On May 19, he announced he would transfer to Florida State for his final season of eligibility.

==== Football season with Florida State ====
Golson took command as the quarterback of the Florida State Seminoles in his final season collegiately as a graduate student. He guided the Seminoles to a 6–0 start and an AP No. 9 ranking nationally by October 18, 2015. Golson and teammate Sean Maguire—both starters at quarterback—helped FSU to complete a solid 10–3 record and a No. 14 finish in the AP Poll at the season's end. Golson netted eight starts to a season that was reduced significantly from a concussion—which the Seminole signal caller suffered in the 22–16 loss to Georgia Tech on October 25.

He opened the season with a 59–16 win of Texas State on September 5 and was accurate passing the ball (19-of-25 for 302 yards and 4 touchdowns) in a game where he had no turnovers.

Florida State won in its second game of the season on September 12 convincingly, 34–14, over South Florida to get to 2–0. This game helped cement Golson's role as a game manager as Florida State's running back Dalvin Cook (1,691 rushing yards, 19 touchdowns in 2015) rushed South Florida for 266 rushing yards in the victory. Golson's numbers (14-of-26 passing for 163 yards and 1 touchdown) were modest, but his zero turnovers helped FSU to prevail past the Bulls.

The rest of the first half of the season resumed as Florida State glided past four opponents in five weeks with Golson at the helm. Three games—wins over Boston College (14–0), Wake Forest (24–16), and Miami-Fla. (29–24)—helped set up Florida State's confrontation with Louisville (finished 8–2 in the last 10 games after an 0–3 start in 2015) on October 17.

Golson's stats in the September 18 matchup with Boston College had him completing 15-of-24 passes for 110 yards which included a 9-yard touchdown pass to teammate Travis Rudolph in the first quarter against the Eagles. Golson's numbers at Wake Forest two weeks later were better as he finished with 202 passing yards (20 completions out of 31 attempts) and a touchdown—which was a five-yard pass thrown to FSU running back Kermit Whitfield in the 3rd quarter against the Demon Deacons.

Golson's signature win for the 2015 season came a week later against heated rival Miami (8–5 record in 2015) on October 3 as he threw for 291 yards off 25 of 33 passing attempts that included a 36-yard touchdown pass to running back Dalvin Cook in the first quarter of this contest. Miami's QB Brad Kaaya had been able to help Miami reclaim its lead at 24–22 late in the game with a touchdown pass, but it was FSU's Cook that sealed the 29–24 win for Golson's Seminoles in the fourth quarter as he broke loose on a 23-yard touchdown run with 6:44 left to play.

Golson took his Florida State team to its high-water mark at 6–0 for the year when the Seminoles dismantled Louisville at home, 41–21, on October 10, 2015. Louisville led the contest at 14–13 early in the 2nd half when Golson found Kermit Whitfield for a 70-yard touchdown pass with 8:05 left in the third quarter. This was his best game of the season as the graduate student threw for a season-high 372 yards (26-of-38 passing attempts) and for 3 touchdowns.

With National Championship hopes in the balance, Golson's season turned bitter when Florida State traveled to Atlanta to face the Georgia Tech Yellow Jackets on October 24. In a night game, he played well going 20 of 30 passing the ball for 210 yards but was unable to score any touchdowns. With 0:54 left in the game, Georgia Tech had tied the score at 16–16 after their kicker Harrison Butker made a 35-yard field goal. Golson quickly led Florida State on a drive from its own 25-yard line down to the Georgia Tech 38. Golson had key pass plays of 22- and 9-yards to sustain the drive. The 9-yard pass went to his wide receiver Jesus Wilson as this set up for a long 55-yard field goal try for kicker Roberto Aguayo-as the Seminoles had just 0:01 left in the game. Disaster struck however as the Seminoles had their kick blocked. The ball was then scooped up by Georgia Tech's Lance Austin who ran 78 yards for the game-winning score.

Golson had subsequently suffered from a concussion in the contest against the Georgia Tech Yellow Jackets (3–9 in 2015). Florida State's Coach Jimbo Fisher rested Golson for the next two weeks as the Seminoles had to face Syracuse and #2 Clemson (13–1 in 2015).

With Coach Fisher's team looking ahead to the 2016 season following their second loss of the year (a 23–13 road loss to Clemson on November 3), redshirt junior Sean Maguire took over as Florida State's primary quarterback for the remainder of the season.

After nearly three weeks of rest, Golson returned to the lineup healthy on November 14 as Coach Fisher gave him the start in Florida State's home matchup with North Carolina State. Things got off to a rocky start in Golson's final collegiate start as FSU fell behind 17–7 in the first quarter. Golson was only 5 of 9 passing for 52 yards and had two interceptions in his return. Maguire, who had the hot hand for Florida State and replaced Golson (512 yards and 3 touchdowns passing against Syracuse and Clemson), threw for 231 yards and two touchdowns in the comeback win. Golson's final start ended in a Florida State win, 34–17.

In Golson's remaining games, he only saw action in the lopsided win over the UTC Mocs. The game was played in Tallahassee, Florida where he threw for 67 yards off 3-of-3 passing attempts in mop-up duty. With Florida State's Peach Bowl invitation, Golson was unable to attend this matchup as he was dealing with a death in the family.

=== Statistics ===
Year	Team	Passing									Rushing				
Year	Team	Cmp	Att	Pct	Yds	Avg	Lng	TD	Int	Rtg	Att	Yds	Avg	Lng	TD
2011	Notre Dame	Redshirt													
2012	Notre Dame	187	318	58.8	2,405	7.6	50	12	6	131.8	94	298	3.2	27	6
2013	Not Enrolled														
2014	Notre Dame	256	427	60.0	3,445	8.1	78	29	14	143.6	114	283	2.5	61	8
2015	Florida State	147	219	67.1	1,778	8.1	70	11	3	149.2	47	−35	−0.7	17	0
Totals	590	964	61.9	7,628	7.9	78	52	23	141.5	255	546	1.6	61	14	

== Professional career ==
Pre-draft measurables
Height	Weight	Arm length	Hand span	40-yard dash	10-yard split	20-yard split	20-yard shuttle	Three-cone drill	Vertical jump	Broad jump
5 ft 11 1/8 in (1.81 m)	200 lb (91 kg)	31 in (0.79 m)	9 5/8 in (0.24 m)	4.85 s	1.74 s	2.77 s	4.35 s	7.25 s	32.0 in (0.81 m)	9 ft 6 in (2.90 m)
All values from Pro Day

Golson went undrafted in the 2016 NFL draft. He attended the Indianapolis Colts' rookie camp on a tryout basis, but was not offered a contract at the conclusion of the camp. The following week, he attended the Philadelphia Eagles' rookie camp as a tryout player. He was signed to the practice roster of the Hamilton Tiger-Cats of the CFL in June 2016. He was later signed to their active roster. He became a free agent after the 2017 CFL season.
