= 2015 Florida State vs. Georgia Tech football game =

- Conference game
Florida State Seminoles	Georgia Tech Yellow Jackets
(6–0)	(2–5)
16	22
Head coach: Jimbo Fisher	Head coach: Paul Johnson
AP / Coaches; 9 / 9
	1	2	3	4	Total
Florida State	3	13	0	0	16
Georgia Tech	3	7	3	9	22
- Date: October 24, 2015
- Season: 2015
- Stadium: Bobby Dodd Stadium
- Location: Atlanta, Georgia
- Favorite: Florida State by 6.5
- Referee: Jeff Heaser
- Attendance: 55,000

United States TV coverage
- Network: ESPN2
- Announcers: Mark Jones; Rod Gilmore

The 2015 Florida State vs. Georgia Tech football game was a regular season college football game played on October 24, 2015, between the Florida State Seminoles and the Georgia Tech Yellow Jackets. It was held at Bobby Dodd Stadium in Atlanta, Georgia. The Seminoles entered the game ranked No. 9 in both Football Bowl Subdivision (FBS) polls and were expected to win comfortably against the Yellow Jackets. On the final play, a blocked field goal returned for a touchdown by Georgia Tech's Lance Austin sealed the upset for the Yellow Jackets and created a memorable moment in college football history.

== Background ==
=== Florida State ===
The Seminoles started their season 6-0 entering the game against Georgia Tech and came off a dominant 41–21 victory the week prior against Louisville. They moved up 2 spots to No. 9 in the AP poll following week 7. They were considered early season favorites to reach a spot in the college football playoff and win the ACC.

=== Georgia Tech ===
The Yellow Jackets opened up their 2015 season with lopsided wins against Alcorn State and Tulane before losing 5 straight games and falling out of the FBS Top 25 rankings.

== Scoring summary ==
Team	1	2	3	4	Total
Seminoles	3	13	0	0	16
• Yellow Jackets	3	7	3	9	22

- Date: 2015-10-24
- Location: Bobby Dodd Stadium, Atlanta, Georgia
- Game attendance: 55,000
- Referee: Jeff Heaser
- TV announcers (ESPN2): Mark Jones and Rod Gilmore

Scoring summary
1	7:14	FSU	Roberto Aguayo 20-yard field goal	FSU 3-0
1	2:38	GT	Harrison Butker 53-yard field goal	Tie 3-3
2	11:46	FSU	Dalvin Cook 2-yard run (Roberto Aguayo kick)	FSU 10-3
2	4:18	FSU	Roberto Aguayo 27-yard field goal	FSU 13-3
2	2:22	GT	Justin Thomas 60-yard run (Harrison Butker kick)	FSU 13-10
2	0:00	FSU	Roberto Aguayo 38-yard field goal	FSU 16-10
3	8:27	GT	Harrison Butker 40-yard field goal	FSU 16-13
4	0:54	GT	Harrison Butker 35-yard field goal	Tie 16-16
4	0:00	GT	Lance Austin 78-yard blocked field goal return	GT 22-16

== Reaction ==
Lead play-by-play commentator Mark Jones called the game's final play on Roberto Aguayo's 56-yard game winning field goal attempt:

"From the left hash. To remain unbeaten. And perhaps a player in the college football playoff and the 29th consecutive conference win. Blocked! Snuffed! Robbed out! Erased!...And Georgia Tech with an opportunity! Austin, still on his feet! One man! You can't believe what just happened! What a time to be alive!"

Georgia Tech radio play-by-play announcer Brandon Gaudin coined the play as the Miracle on Techwood Drive as the heir to the 2008 Miracle on North Avenue which also took place at Bobby Dodd Stadium.

Following this defeat, Florida State dropped to No. 13 in the AP Poll and No. 15 in the Coaches poll. The team went on to finish the 2015 season 10–3, losing in the Peach Bowl against Houston.

== See also ==
- Kick Six
- List of nicknamed college football games and plays
