= List of 2018 NFL draft early entrants =

This list of 2018 NFL draft early entrants consists of college football players who forfeited remaining collegiate eligibility and were declared by the National Football League (NFL) as eligible to be selected in the 2018 NFL draft. This includes juniors and redshirt sophomores who completed high school at least three years prior to the draft. A player that meets these requirements can renounce his remaining NCAA eligibility and enter the draft. Players had until January 16, 2018, to declare their intention to forgo their remaining collegiate eligibility.

== Terminology ==
Year	Interpretation
(redshirt) Sophomore	"redshirt sophomore" – an academic junior in his second season of athletic participation
(redshirt) Junior	"redshirt junior" – an academic senior in his third season of athletic participation; also known as a "fourth-year junior"

== List of players ==
The following players had 2018 draft eligibility granted, or confirmed, by the NFL.

=== Players granted early eligibility ===
Name	Position	School	Year	Round	Pick	Team	Ref.
Josh Adams	RB	Notre Dame	Junior	Undrafted			
Olasunkanmi Adeniyi	DE	Toledo	(redshirt) Junior	Undrafted			
Jaire Alexander	CB	Louisville	Junior	1	18	Green Bay Packers	
Mark Andrews	TE	Oklahoma	(redshirt) Junior	3	86	Baltimore Ravens	
Dorance Armstrong	DE	Kansas	Junior	4	116	Dallas Cowboys	
Jerome Baker	LB	Ohio State	Junior	3	73	Miami Dolphins	
Saquon Barkley	RB	Penn State	Junior	1	2	New York Giants	
Jessie Bates	S	Wake Forest	(redshirt) Sophomore	2	54	Cincinnati Bengals	
Orlando Brown Jr.	OT	Oklahoma	(redshirt) Junior	3	83	Baltimore Ravens	
Taven Bryan	DT	Florida	(redshirt) Junior	1	29	Jacksonville Jaguars	
Deontay Burnett	WR	USC	Junior	Undrafted			
Deon Cain	WR	Clemson	(redshirt) Junior	6	185	Indianapolis Colts	
Antonio Callaway	WR	Florida	Junior	4	105	Cleveland Browns	
Geron Christian	OT	Louisville	Junior	3	74	Washington Redskins	
Simmie Cobbs Jr.	WR	Indiana	(redshirt) Junior	Undrafted			
Keke Coutee	WR	Texas Tech	Junior	4	103	Houston Texans	
Vosean Crumbie	DB	Nevada	Junior	Undrafted			
J. J. Dallas	DB	Louisiana-Monroe	Junior	Undrafted			
James Daniels	OC	Iowa	Junior	2	39	Chicago Bears	
Sam Darnold	QB	USC	(redshirt) Sophomore	1	3	New York Jets	
Carlton Davis	CB	Auburn	Junior	2	63	Tampa Bay Buccaneers	
Michael Dickson	P	Texas	Junior	5	149	Seattle Seahawks	
Tremaine Edmunds	LB	Virginia Tech	Junior	1	16	Buffalo Bills	
DeShon Elliott	S	Texas	Junior	6	190	Baltimore Ravens	
Minkah Fitzpatrick	DB	Alabama	Junior	1	11	Miami Dolphins	
Matt Fleming	WR	Benedictine	Junior	Undrafted			
Nick Gates	OT	Nebraska	Junior	Undrafted			
Rashaan Gaulden	CB	Tennessee	(redshirt) Junior	3	85	Carolina Panthers	
Frank Ginda	LB	San Jose State	Junior	Undrafted			
Rasheem Green	DT	USC	Junior	3	79	Seattle Seahawks	
Derrius Guice	RB	LSU	Junior	2	59	Washington Redskins	
Ronnie Harrison	S	Alabama	Junior	3	93	Jacksonville Jaguars	
Quadree Henderson	WR	Pittsburgh	Junior	Undrafted			
Holton Hill	CB	Texas	Junior	Undrafted			
Nyheim Hines	RB	NC State	Junior	4	104	Indianapolis Colts	
Jeff Holland	LB	Auburn	Junior	Undrafted			
Mike Hughes	CB	UCF	Junior	1	30	Minnesota Vikings	
Hayden Hurst	TE	South Carolina	Junior	1	25	Baltimore Ravens	
Joel Iyiegbuniwe	LB	Western Kentucky	(redshirt) Junior	4	115	Chicago Bears	
Ryan Izzo	TE	Florida State	(redshirt) Junior	7	250	New England Patriots	
Donte Jackson	CB	LSU	(redshirt) Junior	2	55	Carolina Panthers	
J. C. Jackson	CB	Maryland	(redshirt) Junior	Undrafted			
Josh Jackson	CB	Iowa	(redshirt) Junior	2	45	Green Bay Packers	
Lamar Jackson	QB	Louisville	Junior	1	32	Baltimore Ravens	
Derwin James	S	Florida State	Junior	1	17	Los Angeles Chargers	
Richie James	WR	Middle Tennessee	(redshirt) Junior	7	240	San Francisco 49ers	
Malik Jefferson	LB	Texas	Junior	3	78	Cincinnati Bengals	
Courtel Jenkins	DT	Miami (Florida)†	(redshirt) Junior	Undrafted			
Kerryon Johnson	RB	Auburn	Junior	2	43	Detroit Lions	
Ronald Jones II	RB	USC	Junior	2	38	Tampa Bay Buccaneers	
John Kelly	RB	Tennessee	Junior	6	176	Los Angeles Rams	
Arden Key	LB	LSU	Junior	3	87	Oakland Raiders	
Christian Kirk	WR	Texas A&M	Junior	2	47	Arizona Cardinals	
Du'Vonta Lampkin	DT	Oklahoma	(redshirt) Sophomore	Undrafted			
Jordan Lasley	WR	UCLA	(redshirt) Junior	5	162	Baltimore Ravens	
Chase Litton	QB	Marshall	Junior	Undrafted			
Tavares Martin	WR	Washington State	Junior	Undrafted			
Hercules Mata'afa	DT	Washington State	(redshirt) Junior	Undrafted			
Ray-Ray McCloud	WR	Clemson	Junior	6	187	Buffalo Bills	
Tarvarus McFadden	CB	Florida State	(redshirt) Junior	Undrafted			
R. J. McIntosh	DT	Miami (Florida)	Junior	5	139	New York Giants	
Kahlil McKenzie	DT	Tennessee	Junior	6	198	Kansas City Chiefs	
Quenton Meeks	DB	Stanford	Junior	Undrafted			
Kolton Miller	OT	UCLA	(redshirt) Junior	1	15	Oakland Raiders	
D. J. Moore	WR	Maryland	(redshirt) Junior	1	24	Oakland Raiders	
Ryan Nall	RB	Oregon State	(redshirt) Junior	Undrafted			
Nick Nelson	CB	Wisconsin	(redshirt) Junior	4	110	Oakland Raiders	
Kendrick Norton	DT	Miami (Florida)	Junior	7	242	Carolina Panthers	
Isaiah Oliver	CB	Colorado	Junior	2	58	Atlanta Falcons	
Dwayne Orso-Bacchus	OT	Oklahoma	(redshirt) Junior	Undrafted			
Daron Payne	DT	Alabama	Junior	1	13	Washington Redskins	
Kamryn Pettway	RB	Auburn	(redshirt) Junior	Undrafted			
Eddy Piñeiro	K	Florida	(redshirt) Junior	Undrafted			
Trey Quinn	WR	SMU	(redshirt) Junior	7	256	Washington Redskins	
D. J. Reed	CB	Kansas State	(redshirt) Junior	5	142	San Francisco 49ers	
Justin Reid	S	Stanford	Junior	3	68	Houston Texans	
Will Richardson	OT	NC State	(redshirt) Junior	4	129	Jacksonville Jaguars	
Calvin Ridley	WR	Alabama	Junior	1	26	Atlanta Falcons	
Austin Roberts	TE	UCLA	(redshirt) Junior	Undrafted			
Korey Robertson	WR	Southern Miss	(redshirt) Junior	Undrafted			
Josh Rosen	QB	UCLA	Junior	1	10	Arizona Cardinals	
Bo Scarbrough	RB	Alabama	Junior	7	236	Dallas Cowboys	
Dalton Schultz	TE	Stanford	(redshirt) Junior	4	137	Dallas Cowboys	
Tim Settle	DT	Virginia Tech	(redshirt) Sophomore	5	163	Washington Redskins	
Andre Smith	LB	North Carolina	Junior	7	234	Carolina Panthers	
Roquan Smith	LB	Georgia	Junior	1	8	Chicago Bears	
Van Smith	S	Clemson	Junior	Undrafted			
Breeland Speaks	DE	Ole Miss	(redshirt) Junior	2	46	Kansas City Chiefs	
Equanimeous St. Brown	WR	Notre Dame	Junior	6	207	Green Bay Packers	
Josh Sweat	DE	Florida State	Junior	4	130	Philadelphia Eagles	
Auden Tate	WR	Florida State	Junior	7	253	Cincinnati Bengals	
Maea Teuhema	OG	Southeastern Louisiana	Junior	Undrafted			
Trenton Thompson	DT	Georgia	Junior	Undrafted			
Kevin Toliver II	CB	LSU	Junior	Undrafted			
Travonte Valentine	NT	LSU	(redshirt) Junior	Undrafted			
Leighton Vander Esch	LB	Boise State	(redshirt) Junior	1	19	Dallas Cowboys	
Vita Vea	DT	Washington	(redshirt) Junior	1	12	Tampa Bay Buccaneers	
Mark Walton	RB	Miami (Florida)	Junior	4	112	Cincinnati Bengals	
Denzel Ward	CB	Ohio State	Junior	1	4	Cleveland Browns	
Chris Warren III	RB	Texas	Junior	Undrafted			
Toby Weathersby	OT	LSU	Junior	Undrafted			
Jordan Whitehead	DB	Pittsburgh	Junior	4	117	Tampa Bay Buccaneers	
JoJo Wicker	DT	Arizona State	Junior	Undrafted			
Jalen Wilkerson	DE	Florida State	(redshirt) Sophomore	Undrafted			
Connor Williams	OT	Texas	Junior	2	50	Dallas Cowboys	
Eddy Wilson	DT	Purdue	Junior	Undrafted			

† Courtel Jenkins transferred to Houston in 2017, but did not play for them.

=== Players who have successfully completed their college degrees and are draft eligible ===
Name	Position	School	Year	Round	Pick	Team	Ref.
Jordan Akins	TE	UCF	(redshirt) Junior	3	98	Houston Texans	
Josh Allen	QB	Wyoming	(redshirt) Junior	1	7	Buffalo Bills	
Kyle Allen	QB	Houston	(redshirt) Junior	Undrafted			
Baker Mayfield	QB	Oklahoma	Senior	1	1	Cleveland Browns	N/A
Will Clapp	OC	LSU	(redshirt) Junior	7	245	New Orleans Saints	
Terrell Edmunds	S	Virginia Tech	(redshirt) Junior	1	28	Pittsburgh Steelers	
Taylor Hearn	OG	Clemson	(redshirt) Junior	Undrafted			
Sam Hubbard	DE	Ohio State	(redshirt) Junior	3	77	Cincinnati Bengals	
Sam Jones	OG	Arizona State	(redshirt) Junior	6	183	Denver Broncos	
Quenton Nelson	OG	Notre Dame	(redshirt) Junior	1	6	Indianapolis Colts	
Brian O'Neill	OT	Pittsburgh	(redshirt) Junior	2	62	Minnesota Vikings	
Christian Sam	LB	Arizona State	(redshirt) Junior	6	178	New England Patriots	
Tre'Quan Smith	WR	UCF	(redshirt) Junior	3	91	New Orleans Saints	
Courtland Sutton	WR	SMU	(redshirt) Junior	2	40	Denver Broncos	

=== Players who can enter the draft without the need for special eligibility ===
Name	Position	School	Year	Round	Pick	Team	Ref.
Juante Baldwin	DB	Pittsburg State	Junior	Undrafted			
Tanner Lee	QB	Nebraska	(redshirt) Junior	6	203	Jacksonville Jaguars	
Harrison Phillips	DT	Stanford	(redshirt) Junior	3	96	Buffalo Bills	
Byron Pringle	WR	Kansas State	Junior	Undrafted			
