= 2015 Peach Bowl =

American college football game

2015 Chick-fil-A Peach Bowl
- CFP New Year’s Six; 48th Peach Bowl
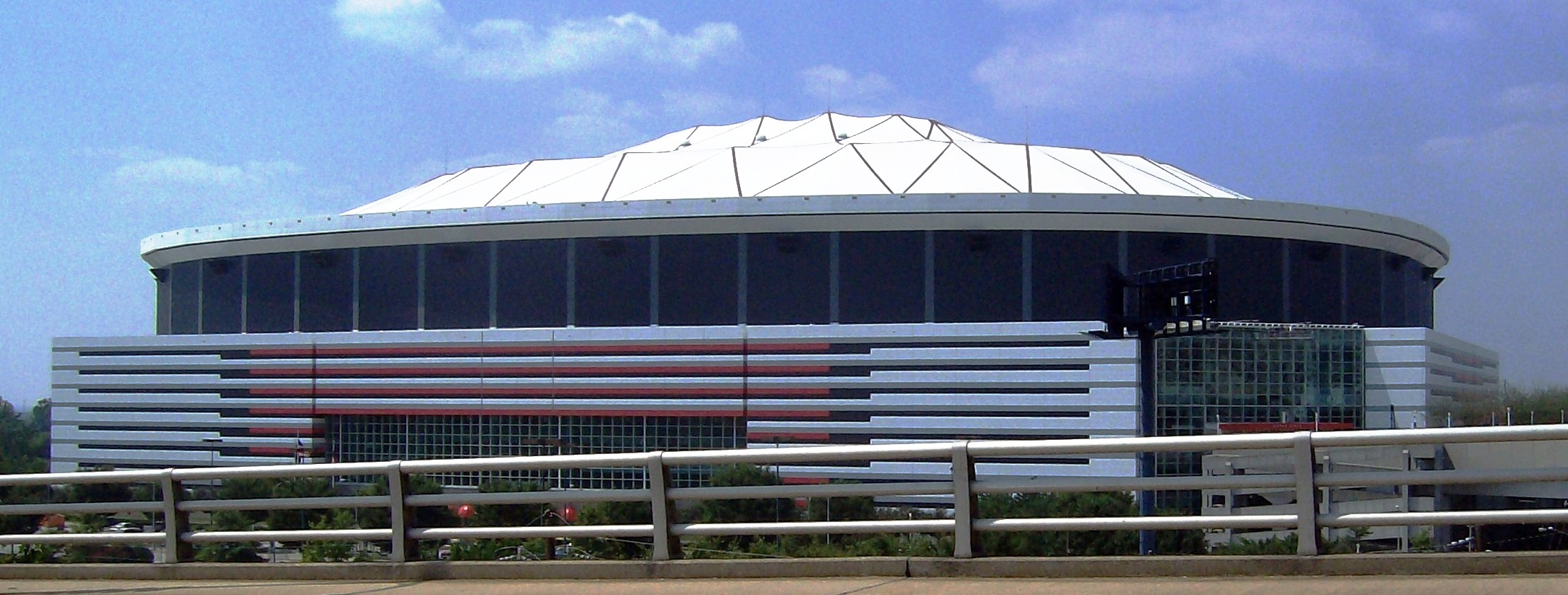
- The Georgia Dome in Atlanta, Georgia, hosted the Peach Bowl.
Houston Cougars	Florida State Seminoles
(12–1)	(10–2)
The American	ACC
38	24
Head coach: Tom Herman	Head coach: Jimbo Fisher
AP / Coaches / CFP; 14 / 16 / 18	AP / Coaches / CFP; 9 / 8 / 9
	1	2	3	4	Total
Houston	7	14	0	17	38
Florida State	3	0	7	14	24
- Date: December 31, 2015
- Season: 2015
- Stadium: Georgia Dome
- Location: Atlanta, Georgia
- Favorite: Florida State by 7
- Referee: Tom Ritter (SEC)
- Attendance: 71,007

United States TV coverage
- Network: ESPN/ESPN Radio
- Announcers: Dave Pasch, Brian Griese and Tom Luginbill (ESPN) Marc Kestecher, Mike Bellotti, & Allison Williams (ESPN Radio)

The 2015 Peach Bowl was a college football bowl game that was played on December 31, 2015, at the Georgia Dome in Atlanta, Georgia. The 48th Peach Bowl was one of the New Year's Eve bowl games. It was one of the 2015–16 bowl games that concluded the 2015 FBS football season. Sponsored by the Chick-fil-A restaurant franchise, the game is officially known as the Chick-fil-A Peach Bowl. The game started at 12:00 p.m. Eastern Time.

The game was televised on ESPN and ESPN Deportes, and broadcast on ESPN Radio and XM Satellite Radio.

== Background ==
Houston, in their first year under newly hired Tom Herman, raced off to a 10–0 start and a #13 ranking, but a loss to Connecticut opened up a chance for Navy to swoop in and win the division title. However, the Cougars beat the Midshipmen handily to win the West Division and qualify for the first-ever American Athletic Conference championship game. Their victory over Temple the following week gave Houston their first conference title since 2006. Since the Cougars were the highest ranked "Group of Five" ranked team, they were selected to play in the Peach Bowl. This was their first major bowl appearance since the 1985 Cotton Bowl Classic.

Florida State had started the season 6–0 before a loss to Georgia Tech on the final play of the game dropped them from #9 to #17 ranked. A loss to then #3-ranked Clemson curtailed Atlantic Division title hopes in the Atlantic Coast Conference. This was the Seminoles' first Peach Bowl since 2010.

== Game summary ==
=== Scoring summary ===
Scoring summary

Quarter	Time	Drive			Team	Scoring information	Score	
Quarter	Time	Plays	Yards	TOP	Team	Scoring information	HOU	FSU
1	5:17	11	64	3:33	HOU	Greg Ward Jr. 7-yard touchdown run, Ty Cummings kick good	7	0
1	0:37	10	88	4:40	FSU	20-yard field goal by Roberto Aguayo	7	3
2	6:11	7	75	2:07	HOU	Chance Allen 20-yard touchdown reception from Demarcus Ayers, Ty Cummings kick good	14	3
2	4:30	3	17	0:54	HOU	Greg Ward Jr. 6-yard touchdown run, Ty Cummings kick good	21	3
3	10:18	9	59	3:29	FSU	Dalvin Cook 1-yard touchdown run, Roberto Aguayo kick good	21	10
4	12:50	10	49	2:18	HOU	39-yard field goal by Ty Cummings	24	10
4	11:12	4	75	1:38	FSU	Travis Rudolph 65-yard touchdown reception from Sean Maguire, Roberto Aguayo kick good	24	17
4	6:08	12	75	5:04	HOU	Chance Allen 17-yard touchdown reception from Greg Ward Jr., Ty Cummings kick good	31	17
4	4:55	5	75	1:13	FSU	Bobo Wilson 14-yard touchdown reception from Sean Maguire, Roberto Aguayo kick good	31	24
4	1:59	7	45	2:56	HOU	Ryan Jackson 2-yard touchdown run, Ty Cummings kick good	38	24
"TOP" = time of possession. For other American football terms, see Glossary of American football.							38	24

=== Statistics ===
Statistics	HOU	FSU
First downs	27	17
Total offense, plays – yards	99–448	71–413
Rushes-yards (net)	53–187	23–16
Passing yards (net)	261	397
Passes, Comp-Att-Int	28–46–1	23–48–4
Time of Possession	34:27	25:33

== Game notes ==
- First loss by Jimbo Fisher to a non "Power 5" team at Florida State.
- Houston is 13–2–2 all time against Florida State
