= Sean Maguire (American football) =

American football player (born 1994)

Current position
- Title: Offensive Analyst
- Team: Purdue Boilermakers
- Conference: Big Ten

Biographical details
- Born: March 11, 1994 (age 32); Sparta Township, New Jersey, U.S.

Playing career
- 2013–2016: Florida State
- Position: Quarterback

Coaching career (HC unless noted)
- 2018–2019: Texas A&M (GA)
- 2020–2021: Texas A&M (OA)
- 2023: Buffalo (DA/QC)
- 2024: Kansas State (OA)
- 2025: Kansas State (Asst. QB)
- 2026–present: Purdue (OA)

Accomplishments and honors

Championships
- BCS national champion (2013)

Sean Maguire (born March 11, 1994) is an American former football quarterback who is currently an offensive analyst for Purdue. He played college football for the Florida State Seminoles. Maguire is a former graduate assistant at Texas A&M, where he was working under his FSU coach Jimbo Fisher.

== Early life ==
Maguire attended Seton Hall Preparatory School in West Orange, New Jersey. He was rated a four-star prospect by ESPN and a three-star quarterback by Rivals, Scout and 247Sports.com.

== College career ==
In 2013, as a redshirt freshman, Maguire appeared as a third-string backup to Jameis Winston and Jacob Coker. Maguire started one game in 2014 against Clemson Tigers after Winston was suspended due to an off-the-field incident. Maguire led FSU to a 23–17 overtime victory and passed for 304 yards and a touchdown on 21-of-39 pass attempts. His 74-yard touchdown pass to Rashad Greene tied that game at 17–17 with 6:04 left in the fourth quarter. Maguire also played in the fourth quarter of the 2015 Rose Bowl.

On November 16, 2015, Maguire was named Florida State's starting quarterback after the position was initially held at the start of the season by Notre Dame graduate transfer Everett Golson, who had beat Maguire out for the starting position. Maguire played in eight games in 2015, including five as the starting quarterback. He posted a 4–2 record and threw for 1,520 yards with 11 touchdowns and six interceptions, completing 59.3 percent of his passes on the year. Maguire broke his ankle early in the 2015 Peach Bowl, which the Seminoles would lose to the Houston Cougars, 38–24. The Seminoles were ranked No. 9 in the AP poll prior to the Peach Bowl and dropped to No. 14 in the post-bowl poll.

Maguire was expected to retain his positions as Florida State's starting quarterback in 2016, but he sustained a broken bone in his right foot in a preseason practice session. He had to undergo surgery to have a screw put into his foot. Maguire returned halfway through the season and was honored during Florida State's senior night in November 2016.

=== Statistics ===
Season	Team	Passing								Rushing			
Season	Team	Cmp	Att	Pct	Yds	Y/A	TD	Int	Rtg	Att	Yds	Avg	TD
2013	Florida State	13	21	61.9	116	5.5	2	2	120.7	2	-1	-0.5	0
2014	Florida State	25	49	51.0	339	6.9	1	2	107.7	8	-49	-6.1	0
2015	Florida State	112	189	59.3	1,520	8.0	11	6	139.7	7	-71	-10.1	0
2016	Florida State	7	12	58.3	64	5.3	2	1	141.5	1	-10	-10.0	0
Career		157	271	57.9	2,039	7.5	16	11	132.5	18	-131	-7.3	0

== Professional career ==
Maguire was rated as the 38th best quarterback in the 2017 NFL draft by NFLDraftScout.com.

Pre-draft measurables
Height	Weight	Arm length	Hand span	Wingspan	40-yard dash	10-yard split	20-yard split	20-yard shuttle	Three-cone drill	Vertical jump	Broad jump
6 ft 1 7/8 in (1.88 m)	219 lb (99 kg)	30 7/8 in (0.78 m)	8 7/8 in (0.23 m)	6 ft 4 1/8 in (1.93 m)	5.24 s	1.87 s	3.01 s	4.66 s	7.53 s	24.0 in (0.61 m)	8 ft 3 in (2.51 m)
All values from Florida State Pro Day

After going undrafted, he participated in rookie minicamp with the Tennessee Titans in May 2017.
