= Terrance Smith =

American football player (born 1993)

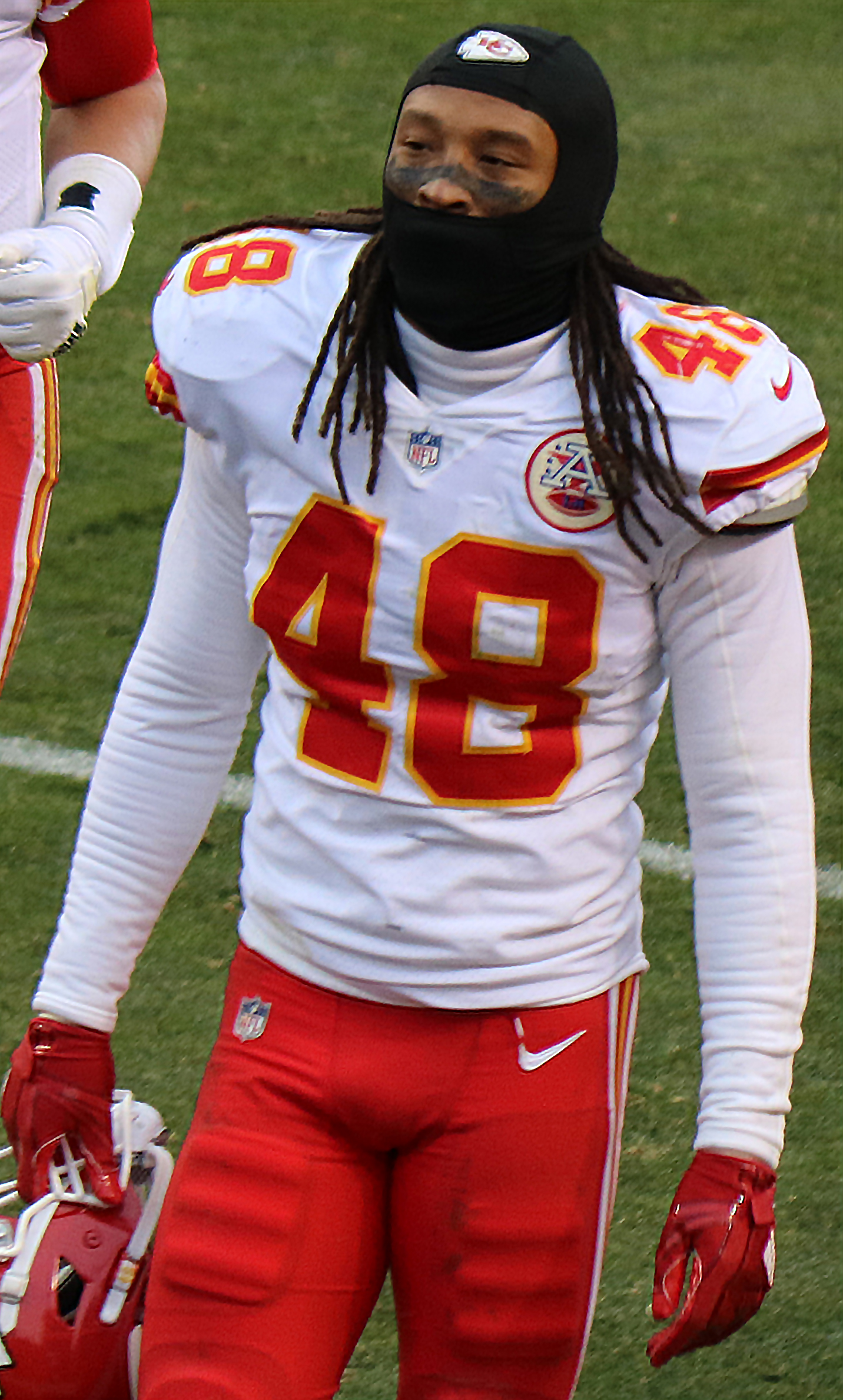
- Smith with the Kansas City Chiefs in 2017

No. 48, 54
- Position: Linebacker

Personal information
- Born: May 3, 1993 (age 33); Decatur, Georgia, U.S.
- Listed height: 6 ft 2 in (1.88 m)
- Listed weight: 235 lb (107 kg)

Career information
- High school: Southwest DeKalb (Decatur)
- College: Florida State
- NFL draft: 2016: undrafted

Career history
- Kansas City Chiefs (2016–2018); Miami Dolphins (2019)*; Arizona Cardinals (2020); Ottawa Redblacks (2022)*; Orlando Guardians (2023)
- * Offseason or practice squad member only

Awards and highlights
- BCS national champion (2013); Second-team All-ACC (2014)

Career NFL statistics
- Total tackles: 38
- Sacks: 1
- Interceptions: 1
- Stats at Pro Football Reference

Terrance Smith (born May 3, 1993) is an American former professional football player who was a linebacker in the National Football League (NFL). He played college football for the Florida State Seminoles. He was signed by the Kansas City Chiefs as an undrafted free agent after the 2016 NFL draft.

== Early life ==
Smith attended Southwest Dekalb High School in Decatur, Georgia. As a junior, he recorded 120+ tackles, 15 sacks and 15 tackles-for-loss. As a senior, he recorded 60 tackles and 10 sacks in just nine games. He was rated a three-star prospect by Rivals.com, their 18th overall outside linebacker. He was rated four-stars and ranked the 21st overall defensive end by Scout.com. 247Sports.com rated him a three-star recruit, he was also ranked the 26th overall outside linebacker by ESPN. He was #27 on the SuperPrep Georgia 83, #34 on The Atlanta Journal-Constitution's top 50 recruits list. While at Southwest Dekalb, he also was a sprinter/jumper on the school's track & field team.

== College career ==
Smith then attended Florida State University where he majored in social science. As a true freshman in 2011, he appeared in the first two games of the season, recording one tackle, before suffering an injury. He was given a medical redshirt. In 2012, as a redshirt freshman, he appeared mostly on special teams. He recorded nine tackles (eight solo.) and 1.5 tackles-for-loss. As a redshirt sophomore in 2013 he appeared in 13 games (10 starts). He recorded 59 tackles, 2.5 tackles-for-loss, two sacks, one interception and three passes defensed. For the season, he was named All-ACC honorable mention. In 2014 as a redshirt junior, he recorded 86 tackles (53 solo.), 4.5 tackles-for-loss, one sack, two interceptions, one pass defensed and one forced fumble. He was named Second-team All-ACC. During his injury shortened 2015 season, he started nine games, missing four due to an ankle injury. He recorded 64 tackles (33 solo.), 3.5 tackles-for-loss, and one sack. After the season, he appeared in the 2016 East–West Shrine Game.

=== Career statistics ===
Season				Defense					Interceptions			Fumbles	
Year	Team	GP	GS	Tack.	Solo.	Ass.	Sacks	TFL	INT	YDS	TD	FF	FR
2011	FSU	2	0	1	0	1	0	0	0	0	0	0	0
2012	FSU	--	--	9	8	1	0	1.5	0	0	0	0	0
2013	FSU	13	10	59	34	35	2	2.5	1	32	0	0	0
2014	FSU	12	12	86	53	33	1	4.5	2	97	1	1	0
2015	FSU	9	9	64	33	31	1	3.5	0	0	0	0	0
Career		36	31	219	128	91	4	12.0	3	122	1	1	0

== Professional career ==
Pre-draft measurables
Height	Weight	Arm length	Hand span	40-yard dash	10-yard split	20-yard split	20-yard shuttle	Three-cone drill	Vertical jump	Broad jump	Bench press
6 ft 2 in (1.88 m)	235 lb (107 kg)	33 3/4 in (0.86 m)	9 7/8 in (0.25 m)	4.77 s	1.65 s	2.77 s	4.49 s	7.14 s	34 1/2 in (0.88 m)	10 ft 00 in (3.05 m)	19 reps
All values from 2016 NFL Scouting Combine (except shuttle and cone, from Florida State pro day).

=== Kansas City Chiefs ===
After going undrafted in the 2016 NFL draft, Smith was signed by the Kansas City Chiefs on May 6, 2016. On September 3, he was waived during final cuts. On September 5, he was signed to the Chiefs' practice squad. On November 1, he was promoted to the Chiefs' active roster.

On October 23, 2018, Smith was placed on injured reserve with a knee injury.

=== Miami Dolphins ===
On August 11, 2019, Smith was signed by the Miami Dolphins. He was released on August 31, 2019.

=== Arizona Cardinals ===
On November 16, 2020, Smith was signed to the practice squad of the Arizona Cardinals. He was elevated to the active roster on December 19, December 25, and January 2, 2021, for the team's weeks 15, 16, and 17 games against the Philadelphia Eagles, San Francisco 49ers, and Los Angeles Rams, and reverted to the practice squad after each game. He signed a reserve/future contract on January 5, 2021. He was released on August 30, 2021.

=== Ottawa Redblacks ===
Smith signed with the Ottawa Redblacks of the Canadian Football League (CFL) on March 22, 2022. Smith was released as part of the team's final roster cuts on June 4, 2022.

=== Orlando Guardians ===
On November 17, 2022, Smith was drafted by the Orlando Guardians of the XFL. The Guardians folded when the XFL and USFL merged to create the United Football League (UFL).

== Personal life ==
Smith is the son of former Clemson wide receiver, Terry Smith.

Smith's cousin is current Tennessee Titans wide receiver DeAndre Hopkins.
