= Trey Marshall =

American football player (born 1996)

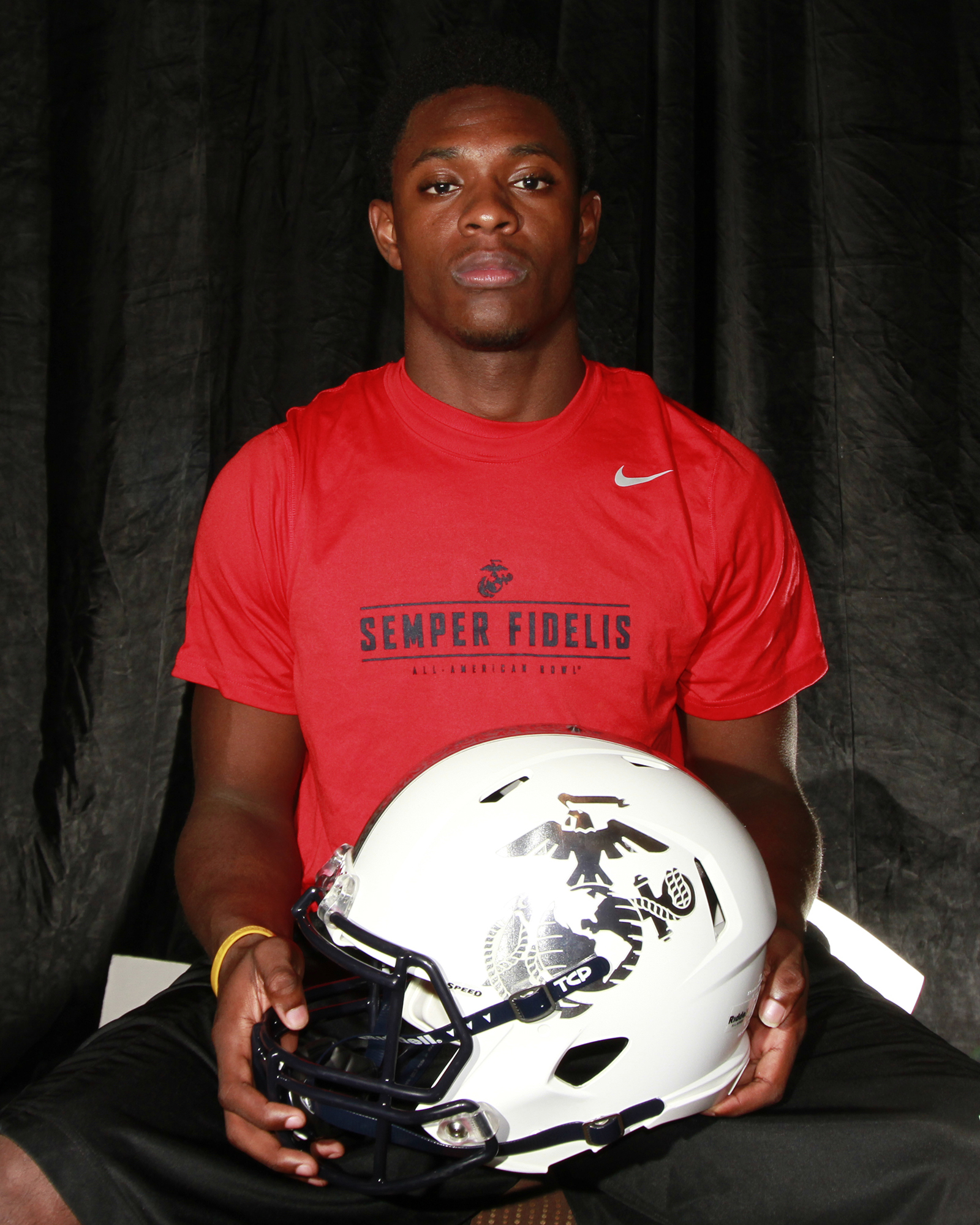
- Smith c. 2014

No. 36
- Position: Safety

Personal information
- Born: February 13, 1996 (age 30); Lake City, Florida, U.S.
- Listed height: 6 ft 0 in (1.83 m)
- Listed weight: 207 lb (94 kg)

Career information
- High school: Columbia (Lake City)
- College: Florida State
- NFL draft: 2018: undrafted

Career history
- Denver Broncos (2018–2020); Los Angeles Chargers (2021)

Career NFL statistics
- Total tackles: 50
- Forced fumbles: 1
- Fumble recoveries: 2
- Stats at Pro Football Reference

Trey Marshall (born February 13, 1996) is an American former professional football player who was a safety in the National Football League (NFL). He played college football for the Florida State Seminoles.

== Early life ==
Marshall was born and raised in Lake City, Florida, and attend Columbia High School. As a junior, Marshall earned first-team All-State honors and was considered to be "among the best safety prospects in the nation." He was then ultimately committed to Florida State over Ole Miss during the summer going into his senior year. Marshall missed most of his senior season due to injury when he ruptured his stomach due to a hit on kickoff coverage during the team's opening game against Lincoln High School. Through rehab, he was able to rejoin the team towards the end of the season and play for Columbia in the state playoffs.

== College career ==
Marshall attended Florida State University beginning in January 2014 as an early enrollee, and he played four seasons with the Seminoles, appearing in 31 games. Despite losing 50 pounds due to his stomach injury, Marshall was able to work his way back to shape and play as a true freshman, appearing mostly on special teams. His sophomore and senior years were both cut short due to injury. Over the course of his collegiate career he recorded 135 tackles, one sack and six passes defended.

== Professional career ==
=== Denver Broncos ===
Marshall signed with the Denver Broncos as an undrafted free agent on April 28, 2018. He was cut by the team at the end of training camp and subsequently re-signed to the team's practice squad on September 2, 2018. Marshall was promoted to the active roster on December 10, 2018 in order to prevent him from being signed by the Arizona Cardinals, releasing special teams regular Shamarko Thomas in the process. Marshall made his NFL debut on December 15, 2018, against the Cleveland Browns.

Marshall made the 53-man roster out of training camp in 2019 and played in all 16 of the Broncos games. He started the final two games on the season and finished the year with 25 tackles and one forced fumble. Marshall signed a one-year exclusive-rights free agent tender with the Broncos on April 18, 2020.

The Broncos placed another exclusive-rights free agent tender on Marshall on March 16, 2021. He signed the one-year contract on May 18. He was waived on August 31, 2021.

=== Los Angeles Chargers ===
On September 1, 2021, Marshall was claimed off waivers by the Los Angeles Chargers.
