= Marcus Lewis (gridiron football) =

American football player (born 1996)

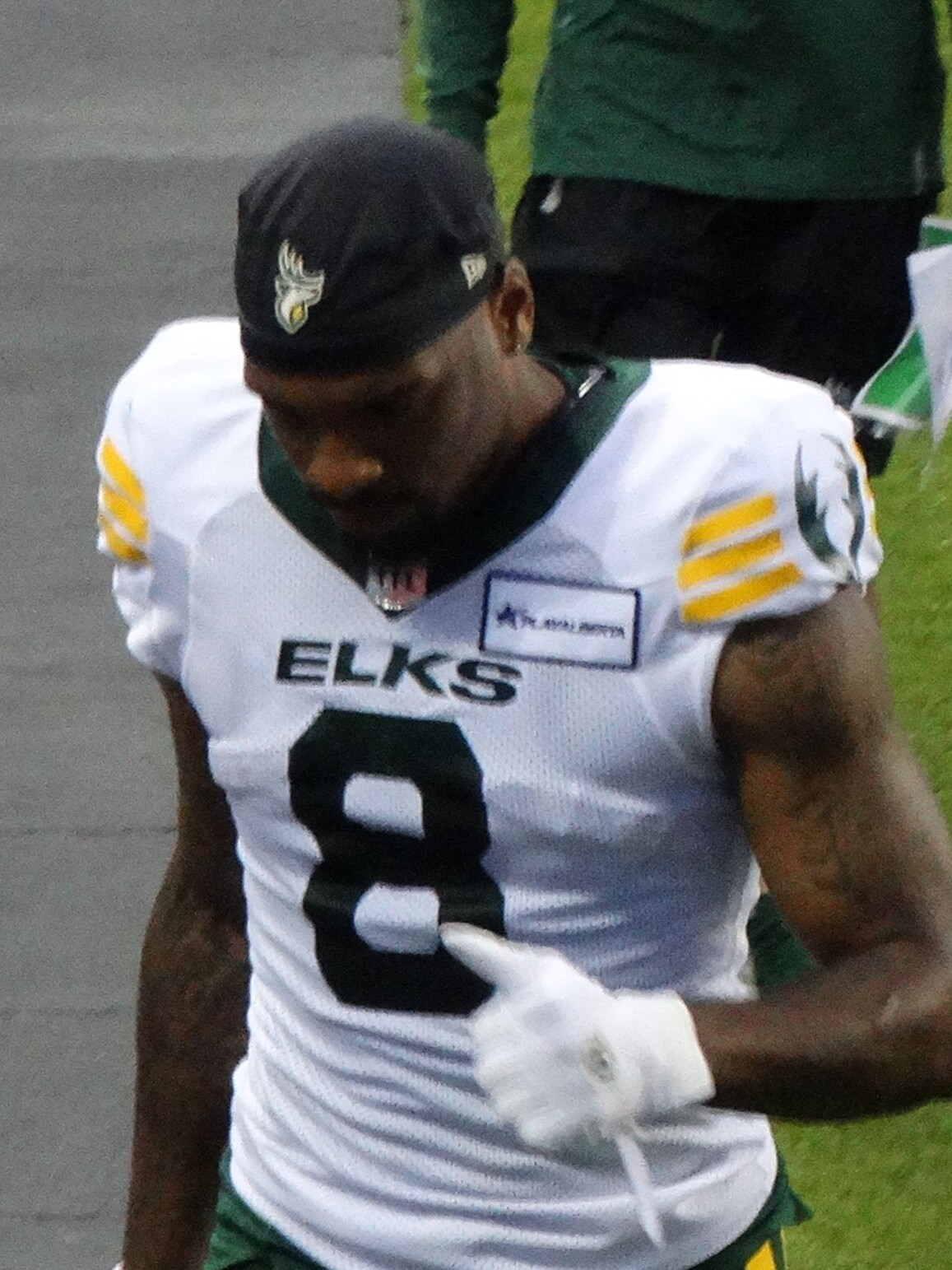
- Lewis with the Edmonton Elks in 2024

Profile
- Position: Defensive back

Personal information
- Born: July 29, 1996 (age 30); Washington, D.C., U.S.
- Listed height: 6 ft 0 in (1.83 m)
- Listed weight: 195 lb (88 kg)

Career information
- High school: Gonzaga (Washington, D.C.)
- College: Florida State, Maryland
- NFL draft: 2020: undrafted

Career history
- 2021: Ottawa Redblacks
- 2022: Edmonton Elks*
- 2022: Philadelphia Stars
- 2023: New Jersey Generals*
- 2023–2024: Edmonton Elks
- * Offseason or practice squad member only
- Stats at CFL.ca

Marcus Lewis (born July 29, 1996) is an American professional football defensive back. He played college football at Florida State and Maryland. He has been a member of the Ottawa Redblacks and Edmonton Elks of the Canadian Football League (CFL), and the Philadelphia Stars and New Jersey Generals of the United States Football League (USFL).

== Early life ==
Lewis played high school football at Gonzaga College High School in Washington, D.C. He played in the Under Armour All-America Game.

== College career ==
Lewis played college football at Florida State from 2015 to 2016. He played in four games in 2015. He appeared in eight games, starting five, in 2016, recording 21 tackles, two pass breakups, one interception and one fumble recovery.

Lewis transferred to play at Maryland from 2017 to 2019. He sat out the 2017 season due to NCAA transfer rules. He played in five games in 2018, totaling 11 tackles and two pass breakups. Lewis started in 10 games in 2019, accumulating 33 tackles and two interceptions.

== Professional career ==
=== Ottawa Redblacks ===
Lewis signed with the Ottawa Redblacks of the Canadian Football League (CFL) on December 14, 2020. He was placed on injured reserve on August 6, moved to the practice roster on August 20, promoted to the active roster on August 27, placed on injured reserve on September 27, moved to the practice roster on October 5, and released on October 10, 2021. Overall, he played in four games, all starts, in 2021, recording nine tackles on defense.

=== Edmonton Elks (first stint) ===
Lewis was signed by the Edmonton Elks of the CFL on February 2, 2022. He was released on February 11, 2022.

=== Philadelphia Stars ===
Lewis played in six games for the Philadelphia Stars of the United States Football League (USFL) in 2022, totaling 11 solo tackles, five assisted tackles and one reception for five yards. He was waived by the Stars on January 5, 2023.

=== New Jersey Generals ===
Lewis was claimed off waivers by the New Jersey Generals on January 5, 2023. He was released on April 10, 2023.

=== Edmonton Elks (second stint) ===
Lewis signed with the Elks on April 17, 2023, was released on May 16, and re-signed with the team on June 19, 2023. He was placed on injured reserve on October 5, 2023. Overall, he played in 13 games, all starts, for the Elks in 2023, recording 34 tackles on defense and four interceptions. Lewis dressed in 11 games, starting eight, during the 2024 season, posting 19 defensive tackles, one special teams tackle, and one interception. He was released on June 1, 2025.
