= Kermit Whitfield =

American gridiron football player (born 1993)

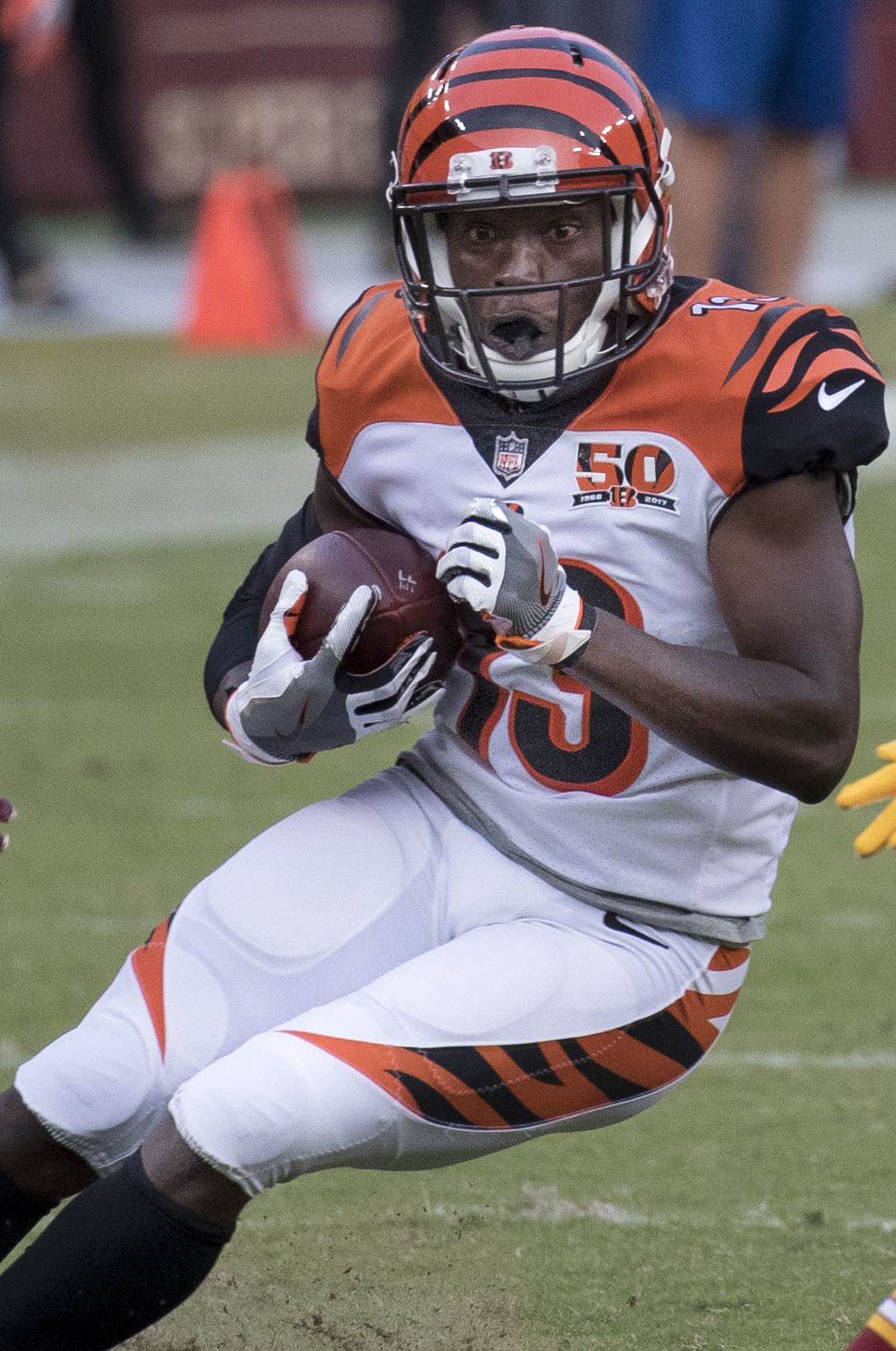
- Whitfield with the Cincinnati Bengals in 2017

No. 13
- Position: Wide receiver

Personal information
- Born: October 8, 1993 (age 33); Orlando, Florida, U.S.
- Listed height: 5 ft 8 in (1.73 m)
- Listed weight: 192 lb (87 kg)

Career information
- High school: Orlando (FL) Jones
- College: Florida State
- NFL draft: 2017: undrafted

Career history
- Chicago Bears (2017)*; Cincinnati Bengals (2017–2019)*; Los Angeles Wildcats (2020); Dallas Renegades (2020); Saskatchewan Roughriders (2021)*
- * Offseason or practice squad member only

Awards and highlights
- NCAA kickoff return leader (2013); BCS national champion (2013); Second-team All-ACC (2015); Atlantic Coast Conference record, yds/kickoff return (2013–2016)
- Stats at Pro Football Reference

Levonte "Kermit" Whitfield (born October 8, 1993) is an American former professional football wide receiver and return specialist. He played college football for the Florida State Seminoles.

== College career ==
As a freshman in 2013, he led all NCAA major college players with an average of 36.4 yards per kickoff return. Against the #2 Auburn Tigers in the 2014 BCS National Championship Game, with the Seminoles trailing 24-20, Whitfield returned a kickoff from Cody Parkey 100 yards for a go-ahead touchdown in the fourth quarter. His 36.4 yard average broke the Atlantic Coast Conference record and was the seventh best average in NCAA major college history. Through the first nine games of the 2015 season, Whitfield had caught 40 passes for 482 yards. He caught nine passes for 172 yards against Louisville on October 17, 2015.

== Professional career ==
Pre-draft measurables
Height	Weight	Arm length	Hand span	40-yard dash	20-yard shuttle	Three-cone drill	Vertical jump	Broad jump	Bench press
5 ft 7 3/4 in (1.72 m)	185 lb (84 kg)	30 in (0.76 m)	8 1/2 in (0.22 m)	4.44 s	4.37 s	7.17 s	32.5 in (0.83 m)	10 ft 0 in (3.05 m)	8 reps
All values from NFL Combine

=== Chicago Bears ===
Whitfield signed with the Chicago Bears as an undrafted free agent on May 11, 2017. On May 14, 2017, he was waived by the Bears.

=== Cincinnati Bengals ===
On July 29, 2017, Whitfield signed with the Cincinnati Bengals. He was waived on September 2, 2017 and was signed to the Bengals' practice squad the next day. He signed a reserve/future contract with the Bengals on January 1, 2018.

On September 1, 2018, Whitfield was waived by the Bengals and was signed to the practice squad the next day. He signed a reserve/future contract with the Bengals on December 31, 2018. He was waived on July 25, 2019.

=== Los Angeles Wildcats ===
In October 2019, Whitfield was selected by the Los Angeles Wildcats during the open phase of the 2020 XFL draft. He was waived on March 4, 2020.

=== Dallas Renegades ===
Whitfield signed with the Dallas Renegades on March 9, 2020. He had his contract terminated when the league suspended operations on April 10, 2020.

=== Saskatchewan Roughriders ===
Whitfield signed with the Saskatchewan Roughriders of the CFL on February 18, 2021. He was released on July 20, 2021.

== See also ==
- List of NCAA major college yearly punt and kickoff return leaders
