= Travis Rudolph =

American football player (born 1995)

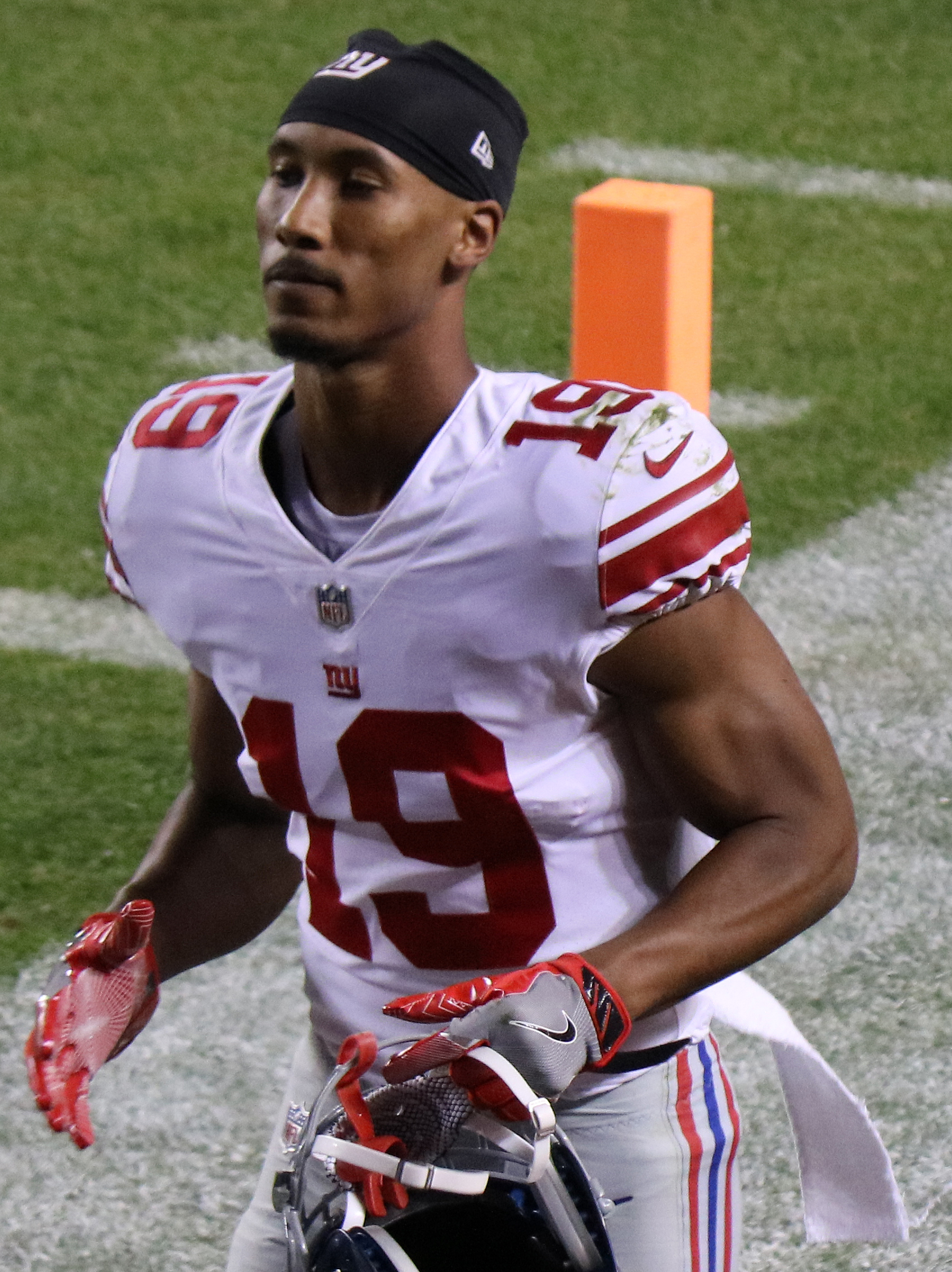
- Rudolph with the New York Giants in 2017

Profile
- Position: Wide receiver

Personal information
- Born: September 15, 1995 (age 31); West Palm Beach, Florida, U.S.
- Listed height: 6 ft 0 in (1.83 m)
- Listed weight: 187 lb (85 kg)

Career information
- High school: Cardinal Newman (West Palm Beach, Florida)
- College: Florida State (2014–2016)
- NFL draft: 2017: undrafted

Career history
- New York Giants (2017); Miami Dolphins (2018)*; Winnipeg Blue Bombers (2020); Edmonton Elks (2024)*
- * Offseason or practice squad member only

Awards and highlights
- 2× Second-team All-ACC (2015, 2016)

Career NFL statistics
- Receptions: 8
- Receiving yards: 101
- Stats at Pro Football Reference

Travis Deonte James Rudolph (born September 15, 1995) is an American professional football wide receiver. He played college football at Florida State, and has previously played for the New York Giants and Miami Dolphins of the National Football League (NFL).

== Early life ==
Rudolph attended Cardinal Newman High School in West Palm Beach, Florida. As a senior, he had 63 receptions for school records 1,237 yards and 15 touchdowns. Rudolph was rated by Rivals.com as a five-star recruit and was ranked as the number one receiver in his class. He committed to Florida State University to play college football.

== College career ==
As a true freshman at Florida State in 2014, Rudolph played in 13 games with six starts and had 38 receptions for 555 yards and four touchdowns. In his second season at Florida State, Rudolph played 13 games with 11 starts. He led the team in receptions (59), receiving yards (916), and touchdown receptions (7). In the 2015 Peach Bowl, he caught 7 receptions for 201 yards, both career-highs in catches and receiving yards. This performance also broke the record for most receiving yards by a Seminole in bowl history, breaking Javon Walker's record of 195 receiving yards set during the 2002 Gator Bowl. As a junior in 2016, Rudolph played 13 games with 840 receiving yards and seven touchdowns. After the season, Rudolph decided to forgo his senior year and enter the 2017 NFL draft.

== Professional career ==
Pre-draft measurables
Height	Weight	Arm length	Hand span	40-yard dash	20-yard shuttle	Three-cone drill	Vertical jump	Broad jump	Bench press
5 ft 11 3/4 in (1.82 m)	189 lb (86 kg)	31 7/8 in (0.81 m)	9 1/4 in (0.23 m)	4.65 s	4.46 s	6.93 s	31.5 in (0.80 m)	9 ft 6 in (2.90 m)	12 reps
All values from NFL Combine

=== New York Giants ===
Rudolph signed with the New York Giants as an undrafted free agent following the 2017 NFL draft. He was waived on September 2, 2017, and was signed to the Giants' practice squad the next day. He was promoted to the active roster on October 9, 2017, after injuries to multiple receivers on the team. Rudolph recorded his first NFL reception in a Week 7 game against the Seattle Seahawks on October 22, 2017. Rudolph finished the game with 3 receptions for 32 yards.

On September 1, 2018, Rudolph was waived by the Giants.

=== Miami Dolphins ===
Rudolph was signed to the Miami Dolphins practice squad on October 10, 2018, however he suffered a torn ACL in his first day of practice and was placed on the practice squad/injured list.

=== Winnipeg Blue Bombers ===
Rudolph signed with the Winnipeg Blue Bombers of the Canadian Football League on January 6, 2020. He was released on April 7, 2021 following his arrest on murder charges.

=== Orlando Guardians ===
Four months following his acquittal on murder charges, Rudolph signed with the Orlando Guardians of the XFL on October 24, 2023, ahead of the 2024 XFL season. The Guardians folded when the XFL and USFL merged to create the United Football League (UFL) and Rudolph went unclaimed in the 2024 UFL dispersal draft.

=== Edmonton Elks ===
On May 6, 2024, Rudolph signed with the Edmonton Elks of the Canadian Football League (CFL). He was released by Edmonton on June 2.

== Personal life ==
In August 2016, while visiting a middle school in Tallahassee with other FSU players, Rudolph made national headlines after he sat and ate lunch with Bo Paske, an autistic student who was eating by himself.

In April 2017, days before the 2017 NFL Draft, Rudolph's father, Darryl, was shot and killed while working as a maintenance worker at a strip club in West Palm Beach, Florida. Police said Darryl Rudolph was working in a back storage room when a coworker, in an adjacent room, accidentally discharged a rifle while moving it off a shelf. The bullet traveled through the wall and struck Darryl in the neck.

Rudolph is a cousin of former NFL wide receiver and return specialist Devin Hester.

== Murder charge ==
On April 7, 2021, Rudolph was arrested in Palm Beach County, Florida, and charged with one count of first degree murder and three counts of attempted first degree murder. According to investigators from the Palm Beach County Sheriff's Office, Rudolph allegedly opened fire on four people following a late night dispute at his mother's home in Lake Park. It is believed that the four people came to Rudolph's mother's home to confront Rudolph about domestic violence accusations. During the physical dispute, Rudolph armed himself with an AR-15–style pistol and fired 39 rounds. One person was killed and another was wounded as a result. Rudolph was initially held in jail without bond.

Rudolph's defense team filed a motion to dismiss all charges under Florida's Stand Your Ground Law. The motion was subsequently denied by a judge in March 2022.

Less than one month later, Rudolph's attorney negotiated his release from jail on $160,000 cash bond. The agreement required Rudolph to remain on house arrest. His trial for murder began in late May 2023.

During trial, Rudolph maintained that he fired the shots in self-defense. Rudolph claimed the four men came over to his house around midnight on April 7, 2021, to physically hurt or kill him. Text messages introduced into evidence by Rudolph's attorneys showed that Rudolph's ex-girlfriend sent text messages to her brother and another man telling them to go "shoot up" Rudolph's home because Rudolph had been with another woman.

Ultimately, on June 7, 2023, a jury unanimously acquitted Rudolph of all charges.
