= Jalen Wilkerson =

American football player (born 1995)

No. 64, 68
- Position: Defensive end

Personal information
- Born: December 21, 1995 (age 30); Douglas, Georgia
- Listed height: 6 ft 5 in (1.96 m)
- Listed weight: 283 lb (128 kg)

Career information
- High school: Coffee (GA)
- College: Florida State
- NFL draft: 2018: undrafted

Career history
- Houston Texans (2018)*; Washington Redskins (2018)*
- * Offseason or practice squad member only

Jalen Wilkerson (born December 21, 1995) is an American former football defensive end. He played college football at Florida State.

== Early life ==
Wilkerson attended Coffee High School in Douglas, Georgia. He committed to play football for the Florida State Seminoles in May 2014s.

== College career ==
Wilkerson attended Florida State from 2015 to 2017, redshirting the 2015 season. From 2016 to 2017, he played in 16 games for the Seminoles. After the 2017, season, he declared for the 2018 NFL draft.

== Professional career ==
=== Houston Texans ===
Wilkerson signed with the Houston Texans as an undrafted free agent on May 11, 2018, but was waived three days later.

=== Washington Redskins ===
Wilkerson signed with the Washington Redskins on August 11, 2018, but was waived on August 18.

On August 20, 2018, it was reported that Wilkerson's football career was over, with Wilkerson writing in a Facebook post, "Closing the football chapter of my life, marking off every goal I ever set, is beyond amazing. I'm so thankful for being able to walk away in peace and good health. I know this next chapter of my life will be exactly where God needs me most. No fame nor money is worth my life. I have a daughter who depends on and needs her father."
