= Roberto Aguayo =

American football player (born 1994)

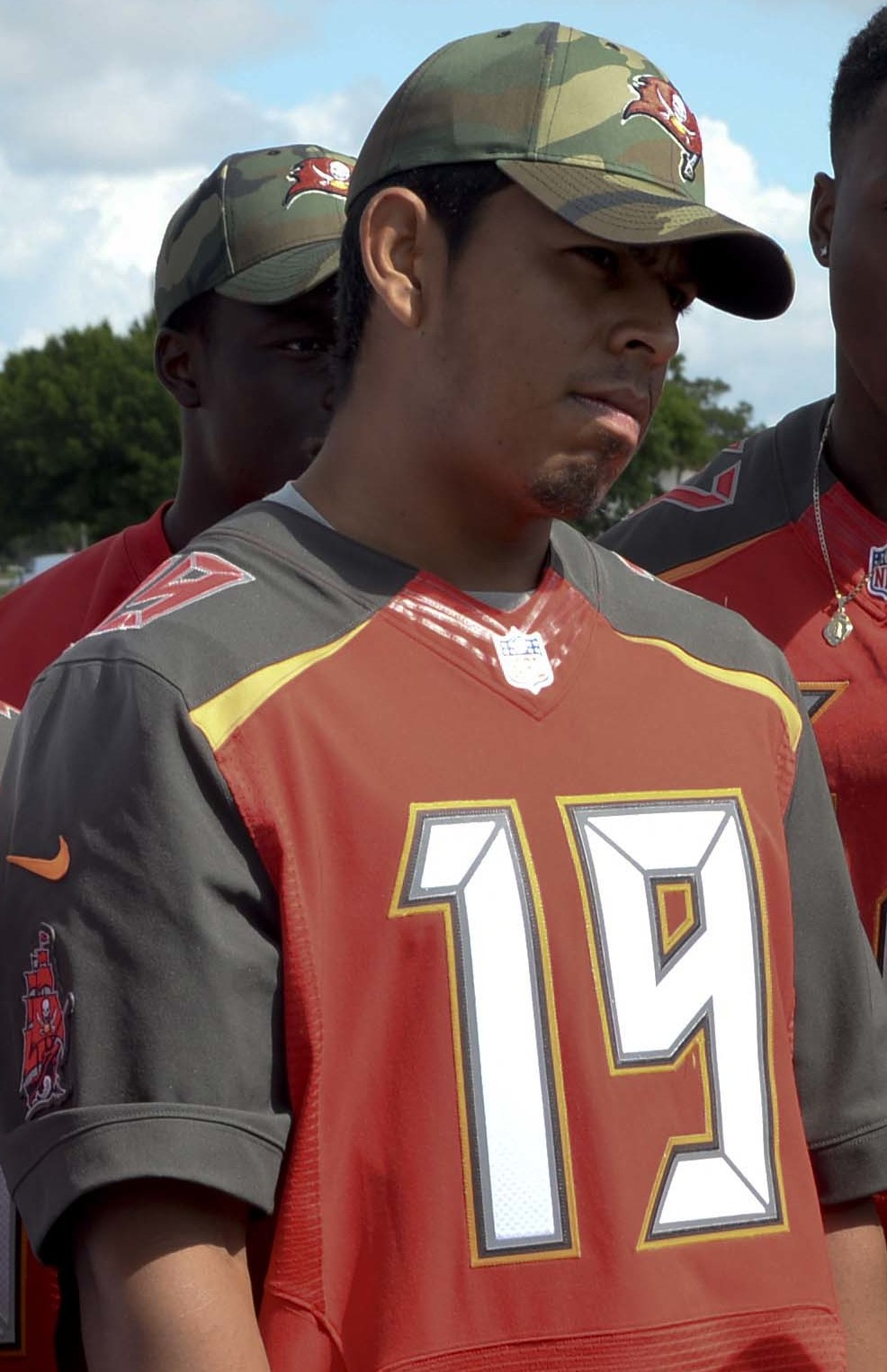
- Aguayo with the Tampa Bay Buccaneers in 2016

No. 19
- Position: Placekicker

Personal information
- Born: May 17, 1994 (age 32); Mascotte, Florida, U.S.
- Listed height: 6 ft 0 in (1.83 m)
- Listed weight: 207 lb (94 kg)

Career information
- High school: South Lake (Groveland, Florida)
- College: Florida State (2012–2015)
- NFL draft: 2016: 2nd round, 59th overall pick

Career history
- Tampa Bay Buccaneers (2016); Chicago Bears (2017)*; Carolina Panthers (2017)*; Los Angeles Chargers (2018)*; New England Patriots (2020–2021)*
- * Offseason or practice squad member only

Awards and highlights
- BCS national champion (2013); Lou Groza Award (2013); 2× Vlade Award (2013, 2014); Consensus All-American (2014); 2× First-team All-American (2013, 2015); 2× First-team All-ACC (2014, 2015); Second-team All-ACC (2013)

Career NFL statistics
- Field goals made: 22
- Field goals attempted: 31
- Field goal percentage: 71%
- Longest field goal: 43
- Extra points made: 32
- Extra points attempted: 34
- Extra points percentage: 94.1%
- Points scored: 98
- Stats at Pro Football Reference

Roberto Jose Aguayo Jr. (born May 17, 1994) is an American former professional football player who was a placekicker in the National Football League (NFL). He played college football for the Florida State Seminoles, where he was the most accurate kicker in Atlantic Coast Conference (ACC) history and third in NCAA history. He won the Lou Groza Award in 2013. He was selected by the Tampa Bay Buccaneers in the second round of the 2016 NFL draft, unusually high for a special teams player.

Despite an accomplished collegiate career at Florida State, Aguayo is considered to be among the biggest busts in recent NFL history. Aguayo served as the starting kicker for the Buccaneers for only the 2016 season. He then had stints with the Chicago Bears, the Carolina Panthers, the Los Angeles Chargers and the New England Patriots between 2017 and 2021 without seeing any regular season game action.

== College career ==
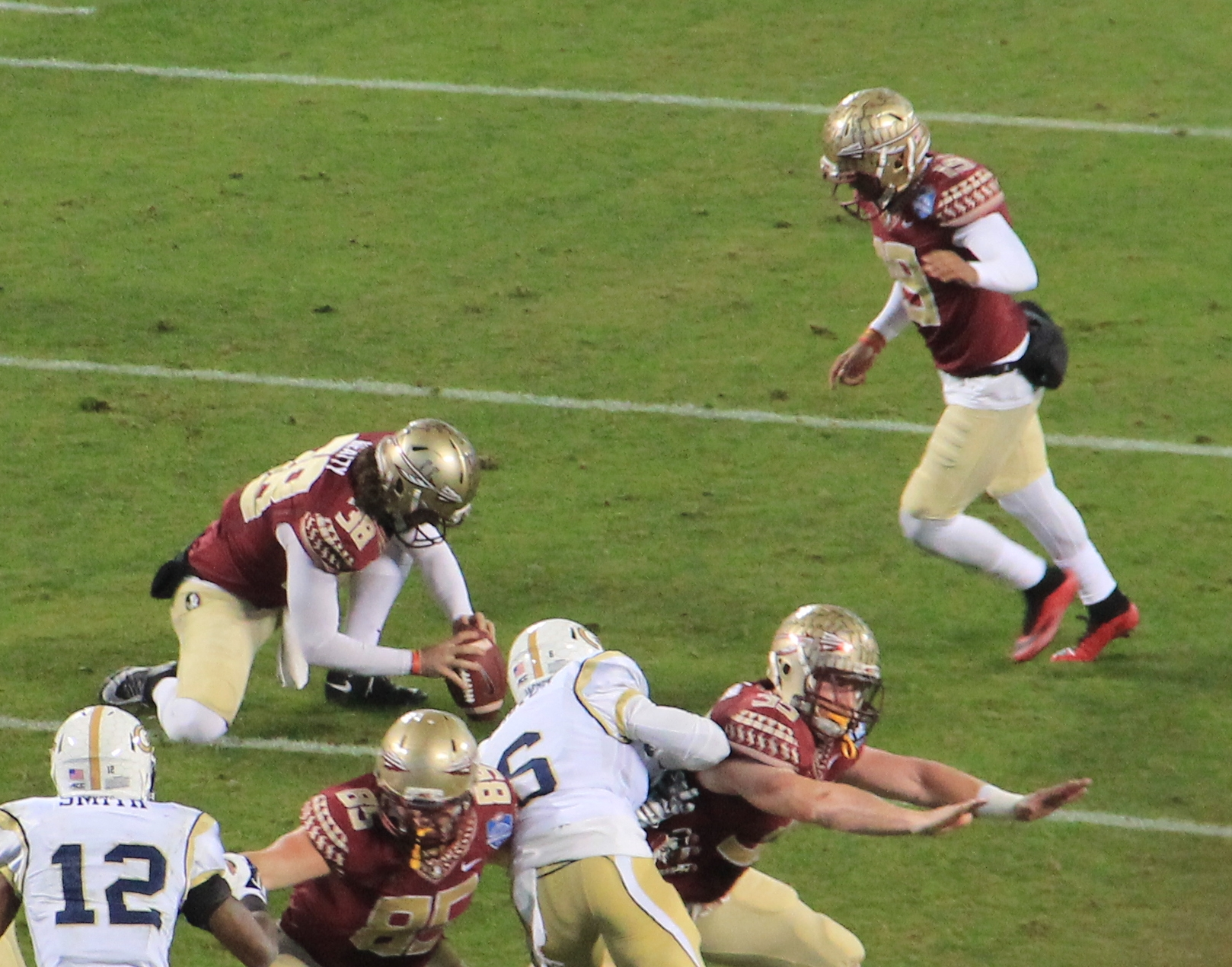
Aguayo kicking against Georgia Tech in 2014

Aguayo redshirted for the 2012 football season, his freshman season at Florida State. Aguayo led the Atlantic Coast Conference (ACC) in points with 157 and field goals converted with 21 in the 2013 season. On December 12, 2013, Aguayo won the 2013 Lou Groza Award. Aguayo led the ACC in field goals made with 27 in the 2014 season. Aguayo announced his intention to forgo his senior season on January 6, 2016, to enter the 2016 NFL draft. In his three years with Florida State, he successfully connected with 69 of 78 field goal attempts and on all 198 of his extra point attempts.

In July 2021, ESPN named Aguayo as part of their all-time collegiate "Special Teams Mount Rushmore", alongside Sebastian Janikowski, Shane Lechler, and Braden Mann.

== Professional career ==
Pre-draft measurables
| Height | Weight | Arm length | Hand span | Wingspan |
|---|---|---|---|---|
| 6 ft 0 in (1.83 m) | 207 lb (94 kg) | 31 3/4 in (0.81 m) | 9 7/8 in (0.25 m) | 6 ft 2 1/4 in (1.89 m) |
All values from NFL Combine

=== Tampa Bay Buccaneers ===
The Tampa Bay Buccaneers selected Aguayo with the 59th overall pick in the second round of the 2016 NFL draft. They acquired the pick in a trade with the Kansas City Chiefs, sending their third and fourth round selections. Aguayo was the first kicker selected in the second round since Mike Nugent, who was selected 47th overall in the 2005 NFL draft by the New York Jets. On June 7, 2016, Aguayo signed his rookie contract, which included a $1.15 million signing bonus. In Week 11, Aguayo went 4 for 4 on field goals and was named NFC Special Teams Player of the Week. However, Aguayo finished the 2016 season with the worst field goal percentage in the NFL among kickers attempting more than two field goals. He went 22 for 31 on field goals as a rookie, including 4 for 11 from 40 yards or longer.

In the 2017 offseason, the Buccaneers signed Nick Folk to compete with Aguayo; his $750,000 guarantee was more than Aguayo's 2017 salary. After missing a 47-yard field goal and an extra point in the Buccaneers' first preseason game, Aguayo was waived by the Buccaneers on August 12, 2017.

=== Chicago Bears ===
On August 13, 2017, Aguayo was claimed off waivers by the Chicago Bears. He was waived by the Bears on September 2.

=== Carolina Panthers ===
On October 25, 2017, Aguayo was signed to the practice squad of the Carolina Panthers. He was released on December 12.

=== Los Angeles Chargers ===
On January 10, 2018, Aguayo signed a reserve/future contract with the Los Angeles Chargers. He went perfect in the preseason (3-of-3 on field goals and 6-of-6 on extra points) and kicked the game winning field goal in the Chargers' final exhibition. Aguayo was waived on September 1, after losing the kicking job to Caleb Sturgis.

=== New England Patriots ===
Aguayo worked out for the New England Patriots on December 21, 2020. On December 26, Aguayo was signed to the Patriots' practice squad after spending nearly two full seasons as a free agent. He signed a reserve/future contract on January 4, 2021. The Patriots released Aguayo on June 17. Aguayo was competing with veteran Nick Folk once again and undrafted free agent Quinn Nordin.

== Personal life ==
Aguayo's younger brother, Ricky Aguayo, took over place kicking duties for Florida State in 2016.

Aguayo is of Mexican descent. He lived in Jupiter, Florida, with his wife Courtney as of 2019. In January 2021, Aguayo and Courtney got a divorce. He plays golf, and completed an internship with the PGA of America in 2019. In 2025, Aguayo welcomed a son.
