= 2017 Virginia Cavaliers football team =

American college football season

2017 Virginia Cavaliers football

Military Bowl, L 7–49 vs. Navy
- Conference: Atlantic Coast Conference
- Coastal Division
- Record: 6–7 (3–5 ACC)
- Head coach: Bronco Mendenhall (2nd season)
- Offensive coordinator: Robert Anae (2nd season)
- Offensive scheme: Multiple
- Defensive coordinator: Nick Howell (2nd season)
- Base defense: 3–4
- Home stadium: Scott Stadium

2017 Atlantic Coast Conference football standings
	Conf.			Overall
Team	W		L	W		L
Atlantic Division
No. 4 Clemson xy$^	7	–	1	12	–	2
No. 23 NC State	6	–	2	9	–	4
Wake Forest	4	–	4	8	–	5
Louisville	4	–	4	8	–	5
Boston College	4	–	4	7	–	6
Florida State	3	–	5	7	–	6
Syracuse	2	–	6	4	–	8
Coastal Division
No. 13 Miami (FL) xy	7	–	1	10	–	3
No. 24 Virginia Tech	5	–	3	9	–	4
Georgia Tech	4	–	4	5	–	6
Virginia	3	–	5	6	–	7
Pittsburgh	3	–	5	5	–	7
Duke	3	–	5	7	–	6
North Carolina	1	–	7	3	–	9
Championship: Clemson 38, Miami 3
^ – College Football Playoff participant; $ – Conference champion; x – Division champion/co-champions; y – Championship game participant; Rankings from AP Poll

The 2017 Virginia Cavaliers football team represented the University of Virginia during the 2017 NCAA Division I FBS football season. The Cavaliers were led by second-year head coach Bronco Mendenhall and played their home games at Scott Stadium. They competed as members of the Coastal Division in the Atlantic Coast Conference. They finished the season 6–7, 3–5 in ACC play to finish in a three-way tie for fourth place in the Coastal Division. They were invited to the Military Bowl where they lost to Navy.

== Roster ==
2017 Virginia Cavaliers football team roster
Players
Coaches
Offense

Pos.	#	Name	Class
C	72	Tyler Fannin	Fr
C	77	Jake Fieler	Jr
FB	27	Jamari Peacock	Fr
FB	49	Alec Shifflett	Sr
FB	85	Andrew Yavinsky	Fr
HB	4	Olamide Zaccheaus	Jr
G	65	Ben Knutson	RFr
G	70	Steven Moss	Jr
G	71	Jack McDonald	Sr
G	74	John Montelus	Sr
G	78	R.J. Proctor	So
OL		Ryan Swoboda	Fr
OL		Gerrik Vollmer	Fr
OT	54	Ryan Nelson	Fr
OT	55	Brandon Pertile	Sr
OT	64	Ben Trent	RFr
OT	67	Jack English	Sr
OT	69	Chris Glaser	Fr
OT	75	Osiris Crutchfield	RFr
OT	79	Dillon Reinkensmeyer	RFr
OT		Ryan Bischoff	So
QB	6	Kurt Benkert	Sr
QB, LS	11	Joe Spaziani	Jr
QB, WR	15	De'Vante Cross	RFr
QB	36	Lindell Stone	Fr
QB		Tristan Hillerich	Fr
QB		T.J. Kitts	Fr
QB		Matthew Merrick	So
RB	88	Justin Zollar	So
TB	1	Jordan Ellis	Jr
TB	22	Daniel Hamm	Sr
TB	25	Lamont Atkins	Fr
TB	26	PK Kier	Fr
TB	31	Chris Sharp	So
TE	16	Richard Burney	So
TE	44	Tanner Cowley	So
TE	46	Evan Butts	Jr
WR	2	Joe Reed	So
WR	5	Doni Dowling	Sr
WR	8	Hasise Dubois	So
WR	14	Andre Levrone	Sr
WR	18	Ben Hogg	Jr
WR	19	Chuck Davis	RFr
WR	23	Warren Craft	So
WR	80	Shawn Smith	Fr
WR	82	Braedon Urie	Jr
WR	84	Terrell Jana	Fr
WR	86	Ross Gardner	Jr
WR		Cole Blackman	So
WR		Ethan Blundin	RFr
WR		Shane Eilers	Fr
WR		Hayden Mitchell	Fr
WR		Darnell Pratt	Fr
WR		Davion Zeno	Fr

Defense

Pos.	#	Name	Class
CB	10	Kirk Garner	Sr
CB	20	Nick Grant	RFr
CB	34	Bryce Hall	So
CB	41	Germane Crowell	Fr
CB		Riah Burton	Fr
CB		Darious Latimore	Jr
CB		Tim Harris (injured)	Sr
DB	33	Darrius Bratton	Fr
DB		Donovan Rolle	Fr
DE	9	Andrew Brown	Sr
DE	90	Steven Wright	So
DE	93	Christian Baumgardner	RFr
DE		Christian Brooks	RFr
DL	91	Mandy Alonso	Fr
DL		Isaac Buell	Fr
DL		Tommy Christ	Fr
DL		Colin Dixon	Fr
DL	98	John Kirven	Fr
DT	57	James Trucilla	So
DT	58	Eli Hanback	So
DT	99	Juwan Moye	So
FS	3	Quin Blanding	Sr
FS	28	Brenton Nelson	RFr
FS	29	Joey Blount	Fr
ILB	30	Dominic Sheppard	So
ILB	37	Jordan Mack	So
ILB	40	C.J. Stalker	Jr
ILB	42	Jahvoni Simmons	So
ILB	45	Reed Kellam	So
ILB	53	Micah Kiser	Sr
ILB		Mikey McDonald	Jr
ILB		Christian Pluchino	Fr
ILB		Robert Snyder	RFr
LB	33	Zane Zandier	Fr
LB	38	Charles Snowden	Fr
LB	43	Elliott Brown	Fr
LB	56	Matt Gahm	Fr
OLB	13	Chris Peace	Jr
OLB	17	Malcolm Cook	Jr
OLB, FS	39	Chris Moore	So
OLB		Dre Bryant	RFr
OLB		Gladimir Paul	So
OLB		Harrison Turlington	Fr
SS	21	Juan Thornhill	Jr
SS		CJ Epps	So

Special teams

Pos.	#	Name	Class
K	89	Brian Delaney	Fr
K	95	A.J. Mejia	Fr
P	47	Lester Coleman	Jr
PK, P	81	Nash Griffin	RFr
PK	87	Andrew King	Jr

Head coach

- Bronco Mendenhall (Oregon State)

Coordinators/assistant coaches

- Robert Anae (BYU)
  Offensive coordinator, inside receivers
- Marques Hagans (Virginia)
  Wide receivers
- Mark Atuaia (BYU)
  Running backs
- Garett Tujague (BYU)
  Offensive line
- Jason Beck (BYU)
  Quarterbacks
- Vic So'oto (BYU)
  Assistant head coach, defensive line
- Nick Howell (Weber State)
  Defensive coordinator, secondary
- Kelly Poppinga (BYU)
  Special teams coordinator, outside linebackers
- Shane Hunter (BYU)
  Inside linebackers
- Patrick Hickman (BYU)
  Director of football operations
- Justin Anderson (BYU)
  Director of player personnel
- Frank Wintrich (BYU)
  Director of football training & player development

Legend

- (C) Team captain
- (S) Suspended
- (I) Ineligible
- Injured
- Redshirt

Roster
Last update: 2017-09-09

=== Coaching changes ===
- On June 21, 2017 Vic So'oto was hired as defensive line coach. So'oto replaces Ruffin McNeill who joined the University of Oklahoma coaching staff.

=== Depth chart ===
Defense

FS
Quin Blanding
Joey Blount
⋅

WLB	BLB	MLB	SLB
Chris Peace	Jordan Mack	Micah Kiser	Chris Moore
Elliot Brown	C.J. Stalker	Zane Zandier	Malcolm Cook
⋅	⋅	⋅	⋅

SABRE
Brenton Nelson
Nick Grant
⋅

CB
Juan Thornhill
De'Vante Cross
⋅

DE	NT	DE
Juwan Moye	Eli Hanback	Andrew Brown
Steven Wright	James Trucilla	Christian Baumgardner
⋅	⋅	⋅

CB
Bryce Hall
Darrius Bratton
⋅

Offense

WR (X)
Andrew Levrone
Terrell Jana
⋅

WR (Z)
Doni Dowling
De'Vante Cross
⋅

LT	LG	C	RG	RT
Jack English	John Montelus	Dillon Reinkensmeyer	Jake Fieler	Brandon Pertile
Ryan Nelson	Ben Knutson	Jake Fieler	RJ Proctor	Chris Glaser
Osiris Crutchfield	⋅	Tyler Fannin	Jack McDonald	⋅

TE
Evan Butts
Richard Burney
Tanner Cowley

WR (Y)
Joe Reed
Hasise Dubois
⋅

QB
Kurt Benkert
Lindell Stone
⋅

Key reserves
WR (H) Olamide Zaccheaus
BB Jordan Ellis
BB Jamari Peacock
KO Brian Delaney
KO Andrew King

RB
Daniel Hamm
Jordan Ellis
Chris Sharp

Special teams
PK A.J. Mejia
PK Andrew King
P Lester Coleman
KR Daniel Hamm
KR Joe Reed
PR Daniel Hamm
PR Chuck Davis
PR Juan Thornhill
LS Joe Spaziani
LS Richard Burney
H Nash Griffin
H Lester Coleman

== Schedule ==
Date	Time	Opponent	Site	TV	Result	Attendance
September 2	3:30 p.m.	William & Mary*	Scott Stadium; Charlottesville, VA	ACCN Extra	W 28–10	38,828
September 9	3:30 p.m.	Indiana*	Scott Stadium; Charlottesville, VA	ESPNU	L 17–34	38,993
September 16	12:00 p.m.	UConn*	Scott Stadium; Charlottesville, VA	ESPN2	W 38–18	33,056
September 22	8:00 p.m.	at Boise State*	Albertsons Stadium; Boise, ID	ESPN2	W 42–23	33,947
October 7	12:20 p.m.	Duke	Scott Stadium; Charlottesville, VA	ACCN	W 28–21	38,638
October 14	3:30 p.m.	at North Carolina	Kenan Memorial Stadium; Chapel Hill, NC (South's Oldest Rivalry)	ACCRSN	W 20–14	50,000
October 21	12:30 p.m.	Boston College^{†}	Scott Stadium; Charlottesville, VA	ACCRSN	L 10–41	39,216
October 28	12:30 p.m.	at Pittsburgh	Heinz Field; Pittsburgh, PA	ACCRSN	L 14–31	30,889
November 4	3:00 p.m.	Georgia Tech	Scott Stadium; Charlottesville, VA	ACCRSN	W 40–36	38,448
November 11	3:30 p.m.	at Louisville	Papa John's Cardinal Stadium; Louisville, KY	ESPNU	L 21–38	46,787
November 18	12:00 p.m.	at No. 2 Miami (FL)	Hard Rock Stadium; Miami Gardens, FL	ABC	L 28–44	63,415
November 24	8:00 p.m.	No. 24 Virginia Tech	Scott Stadium; Charlottesville, VA (Commonwealth Cup)	ESPN	L 0–10	48,609
December 28	1:30 p.m.	at Navy*	Navy–Marine Corps Memorial Stadium; Annapolis, MD (Military Bowl)	ESPN	L 7–49	35,921
*Non-conference game; ^{†}Homecoming; Rankings from AP Poll released prior to the game; All times are in Eastern time

== Game summaries ==
=== William & Mary ===
	1	2	3	4	Total
Tribe	0	0	3	7	10
Cavaliers	7	7	7	7	28

=== Indiana ===
	1	2	3	4	Total
Hoosiers	0	17	10	7	34
Cavaliers	0	3	7	7	17

=== UConn ===
	1	2	3	4	Total
Huskies	0	0	6	12	18
Cavaliers	7	17	7	7	38

=== At Boise State ===
	1	2	3	4	Total
Cavaliers	7	14	14	7	42
Broncos	7	7	0	9	23

The Cavaliers came in as thirteen point underdogs against the Broncos and quickly went down 7–0 within the first three minutes. After this shaky start, the Cavaliers took a 21–14 lead into halftime led by success in the passing game on offense. To start the second half, the Cavaliers took just 3 plays to score, stretching the lead to 28–14. Virginia pressed its advantage to 42–14 before Boise State made it 42–23 on a late safety and touchdown. The win has been hailed as Virginia's "most impressive win" so far under Coach Mendenhall.

=== Duke ===
	1	2	3	4	Total
Blue Devils	7	7	0	7	21
Cavaliers	7	7	7	7	28

=== At North Carolina ===
	1	2	3	4	Total
Cavaliers	0	10	7	3	20
Tar Heels	0	0	14	0	14

=== Boston College ===
	1	2	3	4	Total
Eagles	17	7	10	7	41
Cavaliers	0	7	0	3	10

=== At Pittsburgh ===
	1	2	3	4	Total
Cavaliers	0	7	0	7	14
Panthers	7	14	7	3	31

=== Georgia Tech ===
	1	2	3	4	Total
Yellow Jackets	7	7	14	8	36
Cavaliers	3	10	15	12	40

=== At Louisville ===
	1	2	3	4	Total
Cavaliers	7	7	0	7	21
Cardinals	7	10	14	7	38

=== At Miami (FL) ===
	1	2	3	4	Total
Cavaliers	14	7	7	0	28
No. 2 Hurricanes	7	7	17	13	44

=== Virginia Tech ===
	1	2	3	4	Total
No. 24 Hokies	0	3	7	0	10
Cavaliers	0	0	0	0	0

=== At Navy (Military Bowl) ===
	1	2	3	4	Total
Cavaliers	7	0	0	0	7
Midshipmen	14	14	14	7	49

== 2018 NFL draft ==
Player	Team	Round	Pick #	Position
Micah Kiser	Los Angeles Rams	5th	147	LB
Andrew Brown	Cincinnati Bengals	5th	158	DE
