= 2016 Virginia Cavaliers football team =

American college football season

2016 Virginia Cavaliers football
- Conference: Atlantic Coast Conference
- Coastal Division
- Record: 2–10 (1–7 ACC)
- Head coach: Bronco Mendenhall (1st season)
- Offensive coordinator: Robert Anae (1st season)
- Offensive scheme: Hurry-up spread
- Defensive coordinator: Nick Howell (1st season)
- Base defense: 3–4
- Captains: Micah Kiser; Jackson Matteo; Donte Wilkins
- Home stadium: Scott Stadium

2016 Atlantic Coast Conference football standings
	Conf.			Overall
Team	W		L	W		L
Atlantic Division
No. 1 Clemson xy$#	7	–	1	14	–	1
No. 21 Louisville x	7	–	1	9	–	4
No. 8 Florida State	5	–	3	10	–	3
NC State	3	–	5	7	–	6
Wake Forest	3	–	5	7	–	6
Boston College	2	–	6	7	–	6
Syracuse	2	–	6	4	–	8
Coastal Division
No. 16 Virginia Tech xy	6	–	2	10	–	4
North Carolina	5	–	3	8	–	5
No. 20 Miami (FL)	5	–	3	9	–	4
Pittsburgh	5	–	3	8	–	5
Georgia Tech	4	–	4	9	–	4
Duke	1	–	7	4	–	8
Virginia	1	–	7	2	–	10
Championship: Clemson 42, Virginia Tech 35
# – College Football Playoff champion; $ – Conference champion; x – Division champion/co-champions; y – Championship game participant; Rankings from AP Poll

The 2016 Virginia Cavaliers football team represented the University of Virginia in the 2016 NCAA Division I FBS football season. The Cavaliers were led by first-year head coach Bronco Mendenhall and played their home games at Scott Stadium. They were members of the Coastal Division of the Atlantic Coast Conference. They finished the season 2–10, 1–7 in ACC play to finish in a tie for sixth place in the Coastal Division.

== Schedule ==
Date	Time	Opponent	Site	TV	Result	Attendance
September 3	3:30 pm	No. 4 (FCS) Richmond*	Scott Stadium; Charlottesville, VA	ACCN+	L 20–37	49,270
September 10	10:30 pm	at No. 24 Oregon*	Autzen Stadium; Eugene, OR	ESPN	L 26–44	53,774
September 17	1:30 pm	at UConn*	Rentschler Field; East Hartford, CT	SNY/ESPN3	L 10–13	31,036
September 24	12:30 pm	Central Michigan*	Scott Stadium; Charlottesville, VA	ACCRSN	W 49–35	35,211
October 1	12:30 pm	at Duke	Wallace Wade Stadium; Durham, NC	ACC Network	W 34–20	25,201
October 15	12:30 pm	Pittsburgh	Scott Stadium; Charlottesville, VA	ACCN	L 31–45	39,522
October 22	3:00 pm	No. 22 North Carolina	Scott Stadium; Charlottesville, VA (South's Oldest Rivalry)	ACCRSN	L 14–35	40,882
October 29	12:00 pm	No. 5 Louisville	Scott Stadium; Charlottesville, VA	ABC/ESPN2	L 25–32	34,824
November 5	3:00 pm	at Wake Forest	BB&T Field; Winston Salem, NC	ACCRSN	L 20–27	25,334
November 12	2:00 pm	Miami (FL)	Scott Stadium; Charlottesville, VA	ACCRSN	L 14–34	39,867
November 19	12:30 pm	at Georgia Tech	Bobby Dodd Stadium; Atlanta, GA	ACCN	L 17–31	42,136
November 26	12:00 pm	at Virginia Tech	Lane Stadium; Blacksburg, VA (Battle for the Commonwealth)	ESPN2	L 10–52	63,120
*Non-conference game; Rankings from AP Poll released prior to the game; All times are in Eastern time

== Preseason ==
=== Coaching changes ===
- On December 4, Bronco Mendenhall was hired as head coach.
- On December 8, 2015, former BYU assistant coaches Robert Anae, Garett Tujague, Mark Atuaia, and Jason Beck, accepted coaching responsibilities at Virginia. On December 9, Nick Howell and Kelly Poppinga were announced to be joining the Virginia coaching staff. On December 12, the hirings of Anae, Tujague, Atuaia, Beck, Howell, and Poppinga were confirmed as well as new assistant head coach Ruffin McNeill. It was also announced that Marques Hagans would remain with Virginia's coaching staff as the wide receivers coach.
- On December 15, 2015, Shaun Nua was added as the defensive line coach leaving the same post at Navy. On December 18, Nua backed out of being the defensive line coach and decided to remain at Navy.
- On December 21, Shane Hunter was hired to be the new defensive line coach.
- On March 18, 2016, Mendenhall announced that Hunter and McNeill would switch position duties, with McNeill taking over the defensive line, and Hunter working with the inside linebackers.

== Game summaries ==
=== Richmond ===
#4 (FCS) Richmond Spiders vs Virginia Cavaliers

Quarter	1	2	3	4	Total
#4 (FCS) Richmond	6	10	7	14	37
Virginia	0	7	0	13	20

at Scott Stadium • Charlottesville, Virginia

- Date: September 3, 2016
- Game time: 3:30 p.m. EDT
- Game weather: Temperature: 76 °F (24 °C) • Wind: NNE 15 mph • Weather: Cloudy
- Game attendance: 49,270
- Referee: Jerry Magallanes • Umpire: Mark Shupe • Linesman: Tracy Lynch • Line judge: Jim Slayton • Back judge: Paul Vargo • Field judge: Jim Biddle • Side judge: M. McCarthy • Center judge: Sean Geraghty
- TV announcers (ACC Network Extra): Bob Picozzi and Tom O'Brien
- Richmond vs Virginia (Sep 3, 2016)

Game information

First Quarter

- Richmond – Griffin Trau 28-yard field goal
- Richmond – Trau 35-yard field goal

Second Quarter

- Richmond – Tyler Wilkins 11-yard pass from Kyle Lauletta (Trau kick)
- Virginia – Doni Dowling 20-yard pass from Kurt Benkert (Dylan Sims kick)
- Richmond – Ricky Segers 50-yard field goal

Third Quarter

- Richmond – Wilkins 5-yard pass from Lauletta (Trau kick)

Fourth Quarter

- Richmond – Brian Brown 11-yard pass from Lauletta (Trau kick)
- Virginia – Olamide Zaccheaus 25-yard pass from Benkert (Sims kick)
- Richmond – Gordon Collins 55-yard run (Trau kick)
- Virginia – Keeon Johnson 15-yard pass from Kurt Benkert (two-point conversion failed)

Top Passers

- Richmond – Kyle Lauletta, 24/35, 337 yards, 3 TD
- Virginia – Kurt Benkert, 26/34, 264 yards, 3 TD, 1 INT

Top Rushers

- Richmond – Gordon Collins, 13 carries / 114 yards, 1 TD
- Virginia – Albert Reid, 6 carries / 28 yards

Top Receiving

- Richmond – Brian Brown, 7 receptions / 88 yards, 1 TD
- Virginia – Olamide Zaccheaus, 5 receptions / 75 yards, 1 TD

Top Tackler

- Richmond – Omar Howard, 9 tackles
- Virginia – Micah Kiser, 14 tackles

=== At Oregon ===
Virginia Cavaliers vs #24 Oregon Ducks

Quarter	1	2	3	4	Total
Virginia	6	0	14	6	26
#24 Oregon	13	17	14	0	44

at Autzen Stadium • Eugene, Oregon

- Date: September 10, 2016
- Game time: 10:30 p.m. EDT
- Game weather: Temperature: 84 °F (29 °C) • Wind: N 10 mph • Weather: Mostly Sunny
- Game attendance: 53,774
- Referee: David Epperley • Umpire: Mike Morton • Linesman: Steve Clein • Line judge: Deon Lawrence • Back judge: Pay Ryan • Field judge: Chris Junjulas • Side judge: Angie Bartis • Center judge: Mike Webster
- TV announcers (ESPN): Allen Bestwick, Mike Belloti, and Kris Budden
- Virginia vs Oregon (Sep 10, 2016)

Game information

First Quarter

- Oregon – Royce Freeman 2-yard run (two-point conversion failed)
- Virginia – Albert Reid 7-yard run (Dylan Sims kick failed)
- Oregon – Tony Brooks-James 7-yard run (Aidan Schneider kick)

Second Quarter

- Oregon – Dwayne Stanford 2-yard pass from Dakota Prukop (Schneider kick)
- Oregon – Pharaoh Brown 11-yard pass from Prukop (Schneider kick)
- Oregon – Schneider 20-yard field goal

Third Quarter

- Virginia – Taquan Mizzell 4-yard run (Sims kick)
- Oregon – Devon Allen 77-yard pass from Dakota Prukop (Schneider kick)
- Oregon – Freeman 85-yard run (Schneider kick)
- Virginia – Warren Craft 6-yard pass from Kurt Benkert (Sims kick)

Fourth Quarter

- Virginia – Keeon Johnson 6-yard pass from Kurt Benkert (two-point conversion failed)

Top Passers

- Virginia – Kurt Benkert, 20/39, 193 yards, 2 TD, 2 INT
- Oregon – Dakota Prukop, 21/31, 331 yards, 3 TD

Top Rushers

- Virginia – Albert Reid, 15 carries / 126 yards, 1 TD
- Oregon – Royce Freeman, 21 carries / 207 yards, 2 TD

Top Receiving

- Virginia – Doni Dowling, 4 receptions / 54 yards
- Oregon – Devon Allen, 4 receptions / 141 yards, 1 TD

Top Tackler

- Virginia – Quin Blanding, 9 tackles
- Oregon – Tyree Robinson, 7 tackles

=== At UConn ===
Virginia Cavaliers vs UConn Huskies

Quarter	1	2	3	4	Total
Virginia	3	7	0	0	10
UConn	0	3	0	10	13

at Rentschler Field • East Hartford, Connecticut

- Date: September 17, 2016
- Game time: 1:30 p.m. EDT
- Game weather: Temperature: 76 °F (24 °C) • Wind: S 10 mph • Weather: Sunny
- Game attendance: 31,036
- Referee: Jeff Maconaghy • Umpire: Rich McMahan • Linesman: Matt Fitzgerald • Line judge: Hugh Campbell • Back judge: Keith Parham • Field judge: Kip Johnson • Side judge: Rich Street • Center judge: James Cole
- TV announcers (SNY/ESPN3): Eric Frede, Andy Gresh
- Virginia vs Connecticut (Sep 17, 2016)

Game information

First Quarter

- Virginia – Alex Furbank 23-yard field goal

Second Quarter

- Virginia – Albert Reid 9-yard run (Furbank kick)
- Connecticut – Bobby Puyol 21-yard field goal

Fourth Quarter

- Connecticut – Bryant Shirreffs 1-yard run (Puyol kick)
- Connecticut – Puyol 43-yard field goal

Top Passers

- Virginia – Kurt Benkert, 23/42, 241 yards, 1 INT
- Connecticut – Bryant Shirreffs, 13/24, 154 yards, 1 INT

Top Rushers

- Virginia – Albert Reid, 15 carries / 73 yards, 1 TD
- Connecticut –Arkeel Newsome, 13 carries / 77 yards

Top Receiving

- Virginia – Keeon Johnson, 6 receptions / 73 yards
- Connecticut – Noel Thomas, 6 receptions / 91 yards

Top Tackler

- Virginia – Micah Kiser, 11 tackles
- Connecticut – Nick Vitale, 11 tackles

=== Central Michigan ===
Central Michigan Chippewas vs Virginia Cavaliers

Quarter	1	2	3	4	Total
Central Michigan	0	14	7	14	35
Virginia	15	13	0	21	49

at Scott Stadium • Charlottesville, Virginia

- Date: September 24, 2016
- Game time: 12:30 p.m. EDT
- Game weather: Temperature: 89 °F (32 °C) • Wind: NE 4 mph • Weather: Sunny
- Game attendance: 35,211
- Referee: Stuart Mullins • Umpire: Johnnie Forte • Linesman: John Hoffmann • Line judge: Robert Zivkovic • Back judge: Robert Luklan • Field judge: Bill Dolbow • Side judge: George Liotus • Center judge: Larry Hayes
- TV announcers (ACCRSN): Wes Durham, James Bates, Jenn Hildreth
- Central Michigan vs Virginia (Sep 24, 2016)

Game information

First Quarter

- Virginia – Olamide Zaccheaus 15-yard pass from Kurt Benkert (Alex Furbank kick)
- Virginia – Albert Reid 4-yard run (Richard Burney run for two-point conversion)

Second Quarter

- Virginia – Keeon Johnson 13-yard pass from Benkert (Furbank kick failed)
- Virginia – Taquan Mizzell 4-yard run (Furbank kick)
- Central Michigan – Jonathan Ward 1-yard run (Brian Eavey kick)
- Central Michigan – Corey Willis 85-yard pass from Cooper Rush (Eavey kick)

Third Quarter

- Central Michigan – Amari Coleman 47-yard interception return (Eavey kick)

Fourth Quarter

- Central Michigan – Willis 14-yard pass from Cooper Rush (Eavey kick)
- Virginia – Zaccheaus 82-yard pass from Benkert (Furbank kick)
- Virginia – Reid 5-yard pass from Benkert (Furbank kick)
- Virginia – Mizzell 53-yard pass from Benkert (Furbank kick)
- Central Michigan – Jahray Hayes 5-yard run (Eavey kick)

Top Passers

- Central Michigan – Cooper Rush, 25/45, 402 yards, 2 TD, 1 INT
- Virginia – Kurt Benkert, 27/43, 421 yards, 5 TD, 1 INT

Top Rushers

- Central Michigan – Devon Spalding, 12 carries / 48 yards
- Virginia – Taquan Mizzell, 10 carries / 79 yards, 1 TD

Top Receiving

- Central Michigan – Corey Willis, 6 receptions / 145 yards, 2 TD
- Virginia – Olamide Zaccheaus, 8 receptions / 141 yards, 2 TD

Top Tackler

- Central Michigan – Malik Fountain, 8 tackles
- Virginia – Quin Blanding, 12 tackles

=== At Duke ===
Virginia Cavaliers vs Duke Blue Devils

Quarter	1	2	3	4	Total
Virginia	6	14	7	7	34
Duke	7	3	3	7	20

at Wallace Wade Stadium • Durham, North Carolina

- Date: October 1, 2016
- Game time: 12:30 p.m. EDT
- Game weather: Temperature: 77 °F (25 °C) • Wind: SSW 5 mph • Weather: Partly cloudy
- Game attendance: 25,201
- Referee: Jeff Flanagan • Umpire: Jim Eckl • Linesman: Arthur Hardin • Line judge: Colin Formulak • Back judge: Bryan Platt • Field judge: Wayne Rundell • Side judge: Richard Wilborn • Center judge: David Goodwin
- TV announcers (ACC Network): Tom Werme, Dave Archer, Roddy Jones
- Virginia vs Duke (Oct 1, 2016)

Game information

First Quarter

- Duke – T. J. Rahming 23-yard pass from Duncan Jones (A.J. Reed kick)
- Virginia – David Eldridge 28-yard pass from Kurt Benkert (two-point run conversion failed)

Second Quarter

- Duke – Reed 38-yard field goal
- Virginia – Albert Reid 1-yard run (Sam Hayward kick)
- Virginia – Olamide Zaccheaus 12-yard pass from Benkert (Hayward kick)

Third Quarter

- Duke – Reed 21-yard field goal
- Virginia – Richard Burney 3-yard pass from Benkert (Hayward kick)

Fourth Quarter

- Duke – Joseph Ajeigbe 4-yard run (Reed kick)
- Virginia – Eli Hanback 0-yard fumble return (Hayward kick)

Top Passers

- Virginia – Kurt Benkert, 23/41, 336 yards, 3 TD, 1 INT
- Duke – Duncan Jones, 33/54, 324 yards, 1 TD, 5 INT

Top Rushers

- Virginia – Taquan Mizzell, 14 carries / 46 yards
- Duke – Shaun Wilson, 16 carries / 55 yards

Top Receiving

- Virginia – David Eldridge, 2 receptions / 112 yards, 1 TD
- Duke – Quay Chambers, 5 receptions / 90 yards

Top Tackler

- Virginia – Micah Kiser, 18 tackles
- Duke – Ben Humphreys, 13 tackles

=== Pittsburgh (homecoming) ===
Pittsburgh Panthers vs Virginia Cavaliers

Quarter	1	2	3	4	Total
Pittsburgh	14	21	0	10	45
Virginia	21	7	0	3	31

at Scott Stadium • Charlottesville, Virginia

- Date: October 15, 2016
- Game time: 12:30 p.m. EDT
- Game attendance: 39,522
- Referee: Ron Cherry • Umpire: Tom Laverty • Linesman: Troy Gray • Line judge: Allen Andrick • Back judge: Delbert Bell • Field judge: Mark Furtado • Side judge: Richard Wilborn • Center judge: David Goodwin
- TV announcers (ACC Network): Tom Werme, Dave Archer, Roddy Jones
- Pittsburgh vs Virginia (Oct 15, 2016)

Game information

First Quarter

- Virginia – Albert Reid 5-yard run (Sam Hayward kick)
- Pittsburgh – Jester Weah 38-yard pass from Nathan Peterman (Chris Blewitt kick)
- Virginia – Taquan Mizzell 44-yard run (Hayward kick)
- Pittsburgh – Quadree Henderson 93-yard kickoff return (Blewitt kick)
- Virginia – Olamide Zaccheaus 74-yard pass from Kurt Benkert (Hayward kick)

Second Quarter

- Pittsburgh – James Conner 1-yard run (Blewitt kick)
- Virginia – Albert Reid 1-yard run (Hayward kick)
- Pittsburgh – Conner 1-yard run (Blewitt kick)
- Pittsburgh – Jordan Whitehead 59-yard interception return (Blewitt kick)

Fourth Quarter

- Pittsburgh – George Aston 5-yard pass from Peterman (Blewitt kick)
- Pittsburgh – Blewitt 25-yard field goal
- Virginia – Hayward 36-yard field goal

Top Passers

- Pittsburgh – Nathan Peterman, 11/21, 137 yards, 2 TD
- Virginia – Kurt Benkert, 20/44, 278 yards, 1 TD, 1 INT

Top Rushers

- Pittsburgh – James Conner, 20 carries / 90 yards, 2 TD
- Virginia – Taquan Mizzell, 12 carries / 95 yards, 1 TD

Top Receiving

- Pittsburgh – Scott Orndoff, 3 receptions / 25 yards
- Virginia – Keeon Johnson, 5 receptions / 41 yards

Top Tackler

- Pittsburgh – Matt Galambos, 7 tackles
- Virginia – Quin Blanding, 16 tackles

=== North Carolina ===
121st South's Oldest Rivalry Game: #22 North Carolina Tar Heels vs Virginia Cavaliers

Quarter	1	2	3	4	Total
#22 North Carolina	7	7	14	7	35
Virginia	0	7	0	7	14

at Scott Stadium • Charlottesville, Virginia

- Date: October 22, 2016
- Game time: 3:00 p.m. EST
- Game weather: Temperature: 59 °F (15 °C) • Wind: E 9 mph • Weather: Partly sunny
- Game attendance: 40,882
- Referee: Duane Heydt • Umpire: Marvin Wilson • Linesman: Kavin McGrath • Line judge: Danny Short • Back judge: Jacques Hooper • Field judge: C. Clougherty • Side judge: Tony Tarantini • Center judge: Steve Disangro
- TV announcers (ACCRSN): Wes Durham, James Bates, Jenn Hildreth
- North Carolina vs Virginia (Oct 22, 2016)

Game information

First Quarter

- North Carolina – Elijah Hood 4-yard run (Nick Weiler kick)

Second Quarter

- Virginia – Evan Butts 11-yard pass from Matt Johns (Sam Hayward kick)
- North Carolina – Bug Howard 40-yard pass from Mitchell Trubisky (Weiler kick)

Third Quarter

- North Carolina – Thomas Jackson 10-yard pass from Trubisky (Weiler kick)
- North Carolina – T. J. Logan 4-yard run (Weiler kick)

Fourth Quarter

- Virginia – Taquan Mizzell 1-yard run (Hayward kick)
- North Carolina – Austin Proehl 46-yard pass from Trubisky (Weiler kick)

Top Passers

- North Carolina – Mitch Trubisky, 24/31, 310 yards, 3 TD
- Virginia – Kurt Benkurt, 19/32, 126 yards

Top Rushers

- North Carolina – Elijah Hood, 16 carries / 107 yards, 1 TD
- Virginia – Taquan Mizzell, 19 carries / 106 yards, 1 TD

Top Receiving

- North Carolina – Ryan Switzer, 8 receptions / 72 yards
- Virginia – Taquan Mizzell, 7 receptions / 25 yards

Top Tackler

- North Carolina – Cole Holcomb, 10 tackles
- Virginia – Quin Blanding, 13 tackles

=== Louisville ===
Louisville Cardinals vs Virginia Cavaliers

Quarter	1	2	3	4	Total
#5 Louisville	7	0	7	18	32
Virginia	10	0	7	8	25

at Scott Stadium • Charlottesville, Virginia

- Date: October 29, 2016
- Game time: 12:00 p.m. EST
- Game weather: Temperature: 61 °F (16 °C) • Wind: S 7 mph • Weather: Sunny
- Game attendance: 34,824
- Referee: Jerry Magallanes • Umpire: Mark Shupe • Linesman: Tracy Lynch • Line judge: Jim Slayton • Back judge: H. Wittelsberger • Field judge: Jim Biddle • Side judge: Eddie Bonet • Center judge: Sean Geraghty
- TV announcers (ABC/ESPN2): Allen Bestwick, Mike Belloti, and Kris Budden
- Louisville vs Virginia (Oct 29, 2016)

Game information

First Quarter

- Virginia – Sam Hayward 27-yard field goal
- Louisville – Jamari Staples 15-yard pass from Lamar Jackson (Blanton Creque kick)
- Virginia – Doni Dowling 9-yard pass from Kurt Benkert (Hayward kick)

Third Quarter

- Virginia – Olamide Zaccheaus 9-yard pass from Benkert (Hayward kick)
- Louisville – Reggie Bonnafon 8-yard pass from Jackson (Creque kick)

Fourth Quarter

- Louisville – Bonnafon 10-yard pass from Jackson (Creque kick)
- Louisville – Creque 32-yard field goal
- Virginia – Dowling 4-yard pass from Kurt Benkert (Albert Reid two-point pass conv. from Benkert)
- Louisville – Jaylen Smith 29-yard pass from Lamar Jackson (Jaylen Smith two-point pass conv. from Jackson)

Top Passers

- Louisville – Lamar Jackson, 24/41, 361 yards, 4 TD, 1 INT
- Virginia – Kurt Benkert, 25/39, 238 yards, 3 TD, 2 INT

Top Rushers

- Louisville – Lamar Jackson, 17 carries / 88 yards
- Virginia – Taquan Mizzell, 20 carries / 66 yards

Top Receiving

- Louisville – Jamari Staples, 7 receptions / 120 yards, 1 TD
- Virginia – Doni Dowling, 5 receptions / 70 yards, 2 TD

Top Tackler

- Louisville – Chucky Williams, 8 tackles
- Virginia – Micah Kiser, 14 tackles

=== At Wake Forest ===
Virginia Cavaliers vs Wake Forest Demon Deacons

Quarter	1	2	3	4	Total
Virginia	6	0	14	0	20
Wake Forest	7	10	0	10	27

at BB&T Field • Winston-Salem, North Carolina

- Date: November 5, 2016
- Game time: 3:00 p.m. EST
- Game weather: Temperature: 63 °F (17 °C) • Wind: WNW 4 mph • Weather: Sunny
- Game attendance: 25,334
- Referee: Riley Johnson • Umpire: Michael Wooten • Linesman: Mike Pavese • Line judge: Tim Graham • Back judge: Scot Maslin • Field judge: Mike Cullin • Side judge: Jim Corpora • Center judge: Tom McCreesh
- TV announcers (ACCRSN): Wes Durham, James Bates, Niki Noto
- Virginia vs Wake Forest (Nov 5, 2016)

Game information

First Quarter

- Virginia – Jordan Ellis 6-yard run (two-point pass conv. failed)
- Wake Forest – John Wolford 64-yard run (Mike Weaver kick)

Second Quarter

- Wake Forest – Weaver 46-yard field goal
- Wake Forest – Cam Serigne 3-yard pass from Wolford (Weaver kick)

Third Quarter

- Virginia – Doni Dowling 2-yard pass from Kurt Benkert (Sam Hayward kick)
- Virginia – Taquan Mizzell 45-yard pass from Benkert (Hayward kick)

Fourth Quarter

- Wake Forest – Weaver 36-yard field goal
- Wake Forest – Jessie Bates 39-yard interception return (Weaver kick)

Top Passers

- Virginia – Kurt Benkert, 20/39, 190 yards, 2 TD, 2 INT
- Wake Forest – John Wolford, 9/10, 83 yards, 1 TD

Top Rushers

- Virginia – Taquan Mizzell, 16 carries / 80 yards
- Wake Forest – John Wolford, 16 carries / 94 yards, 1 TD

Top Receiving

- Virginia – Doni Dowling, 8 receptions / 76 yards, 1 TD
- Wake Forest – Cam Serigne, 2 receptions / 24 yards, 1 TD

Top Tackler

- Virginia – Micah Kiser, 11 tackles
- Wake Forest – Marquel Lee, 7 tackles

=== Miami (FL) ===
Miami Hurricanes vs Virginia Cavaliers

Quarter	1	2	3	4	Total
Miami (FL)	7	10	10	7	34
Virginia	7	7	0	0	14

at Scott Stadium • Charlottesville, Virginia

- Date: November 12, 2016
- Game time: 2:00 p.m. EST
- Game attendance: 39,867
- TV announcers (ACCRSN): Wes Durham, James Bates, Jenn Hildredth

Game information

First Quarter

- Virginia – Taquan Mizzell 2-yard run (Sam Hayward kick)
- Miami (FL) – Joseph Yearby 10-yard run (Michael Badgley kick)

Second Quarter

- Miami (FL) – Badgley 40-yard field goal
- Miami (FL) – David Njoku 7-yard pass from Brad Kaaya (Badgley kick)
- Virginia – David Eldridge 13-yard pass from Kurt Benkert (Hayward kick)

Third Quarter

- Miami (FL) – Badgley 44-yard field goal
- Miami (FL) – Ahmmon Richards 77-yard pass from Kaaya (Badgley kick)

Fourth Quarter

- Miami (FL) – Mark Walton 15-yard run (Badgley kick)

Top Passers

- Miami (FL) – Brad Kaaya 14/29, 228 yards, 2 TD, 1 INT
- Virginia – Kurt Benkert 16/27, 143 yards, 1 TD

Top Rushers

- Miami (FL) – Mark Walton, 16 carries / 111 yards, 1 TD
- Virginia – Taquan Mizzell, 22 carries / 89 yards, 1 TD

Top Receiving

- Miami (FL) – Ahmmon Richards, 3 receptions / 100 yards, 1 TD
- Virginia – Doni Dowling, 4 receptions / 77 yards

Top Tackler

- Miami (FL) – Jamal Carter Sr., 9 tackles
- Virginia – Micah Kiser, 12 tackles

=== At Georgia Tech ===
Virginia Cavaliers vs Georgia Tech Yellow Jackets

Quarter	1	2	3	4	Total
Virginia	0	10	0	7	17
Georgia Tech	0	7	14	10	31

at Bobby Dodd Stadium • Atlanta, Georgia

- Date: November 19, 2016
- Game time: 12:30 p.m. EST
- Game attendance: 42,136
- TV: ACC Network

Game information

Second Quarter

- Virginia – Daniel Hamm 4-yard run (Sam Hayward kick)
- Georgia Tech – Marcus Marshall 67-yard run (Harrison Butker kick)
- Virginia – Hayward 30-yard field goal

Third Quarter

- Georgia Tech – Clinton Lynch 54-yard pass from Thomas (Butker kick)
- Georgia Tech – Qua Searcy 60-yard run (Butker kick)

Fourth Quarter

- Georgia Tech – Butker 41-yard field goal
- Virginia – Ryan Santoro 1-yard pass from Johns (Hayward kick)
- Georgia Tech – Lance Austin 24-yard interception return (Butker kick)

Top Passers

- Virginia – Matt Johns, 27/44, 220 yards, 1 TD, 3 INT
- Georgia Tech – Justin Thomas, 5/10, 122 yards, 1 TD

Top Rushers

- Virginia – Taquan Mizzell, 24 carries / 131 yards
- Georgia Tech – Marcus Marshall, 16 carries / 127 yards, 1 TD

Top Receiving

- Virginia – Doni Dowling, 9 receptions / 68 yards
- Georgia Tech – Clinton Lynch, 3 receptions / 85 yards, 1 TD

Top Tackler

- Virginia – Quin Blanding, 6 tackles
- Georgia Tech – P.J. Davis, 13 tackles

=== At Virginia Tech ===
98th Battle for the Commonwealth Cup: Virginia Cavaliers vs Virginia Tech Hokies

Quarter	1	2	3	4	Total
Virginia	0	0	3	7	10
Virginia Tech	7	21	24	0	52

at Lane Stadium • Blacksburg, Virginia

- Date: November 26, 2016

Game information

First Quarter

- Virginia Tech – Sam Rogers 8-yard Rush (Slye Kick)

Second Quarter

- Virginia Tech – Cam Phillips 39-yard Pass From Jerod Evans (Slye Kick)
- Virginia Tech – Sam Rogers 32-yard Rush (Slye Kick)
- Virginia Tech – Jerod Evans 1-yard Rush (Slye Kick)

Third Quarter

- Virginia Tech – Bucky Hodges 42-yard Pass From Jerod Evans (Slye Kick)
- Virginia Tech – Joey Slye 24-yard field goal
- Virginia – Sam Hayward 29-yard field goal
- Virginia Tech – Andrew Motuapuaka 70-yard Fumble Return (Slye Kick)
- Virginia Tech – Travon McMillian 31-yard Pass From Brenden Motley (Slye Kick)

Fourth Quarter

- Virginia – Olamide Zaccheaus 39-yard Pass From Kurt Benkert (Hayward Kick)

Top Passers

- Virginia – Kurt Benkert, 9/26, 122 yards, 1 TD
- Virginia Tech – Jerod Evans, 16/27, 253 yards, 2 TD

Top Rushers

- Virginia – Taquan Mizzell, 22 carries / 113 yards
- Virginia Tech – Sam Rogers, 15 carries / 105 yards, 2 TD

Top Receiving

- Virginia – Doni Dowling, 3 receptions / 26 yards
- Virginia Tech – Cam Phillips, 6 receptions / 87 yards, 1 TD

Top Tackler

- Virginia – Micah Kiser, 14 tackles
- Virginia Tech – Andrew Motuapuaka, 6 tackles

== Personnel ==
=== Roster ===
2016 Virginia Cavaliers football team roster
Players
Coaches
Offense

Pos.	#	Name	Class
TB	2	Albert Reid	Sr
TB	4	Taquan Mizzell	Sr
QB	6	Kurt Benkert	Jr
WR	7	Doni Dowling	Jr
WR	8	Keeon Johnson	Sr
TB	10	Jordan Ellis	So
WR	11	David Eldridge	So
QB	15	Matt Johns	Sr
QB	16	Connor Brewer	Sr
WR	18	Ben Hogg	So
WR	19	Andre Levrone	Jr
TB	22	Daniel Hamm	Jr
WR	23	Warren Craft	RFr
WR	26	Anthony Calloway	Jr
WR	33	Olamide Zaccheaus	So
FB	41	Connor Wingo-Reeves	Sr
WR	44	Tanner Cowley	RFr
TE	46	Evan Butts	So
C	50	Jackson Matteo (C)	Sr
OT	61	Trenton Jenkins	RFr
G	62	Sean Karl	Sr
OT	64	Ben Trent	Fr
OL	65	Ben Knutson	Fr
OT	67	Jack English	Jr
G	70	Steven Moss	So
G	71	Jack McDonald	Jr
OT	72	Eric Smith	Sr
OT	74	Ryan Bischoff	RFr
WR	75	Rambert Tyree	So
OT	76	Michael Mooney	Sr
OT	77	Jake Fieler	So
C	78	R.J. Proctor	RFr
OL	79	Dillon Reinkensmeyer	Fr
WR	80	Hasise Dubois	Fr
WR	81	Joe Reed	Fr
WR	82	Braedon Urie	So
TE	83	Brendan Marshall	Jr
WR	85	Cole Blackman	Fr
TE	87	Richard Burney	RFr
WR	88	Ryan Santoro	Sr
WR	96	Dylan Le	So
QB	99	Joe Spaziani	So
QB		Sonny Abramson	Fr
WR		Ethan Blundin	Fr
QB		De'Vante Cross	Fr
WR		Ross Gardner	So
G		Patrick Kidd	So

Defense

Pos.	#	Name	Class
DT	1	Donte Wilkins (C)	Sr
FS	3	Quin Blanding	Jr
CB	5	Tim Harris	Sr
DE	9	Andrew Brown	Jr
OLB	13	Chris Peace	So
CB	14	Myles Robinson	So
OLB	17	Malcolm Cook	Jr
DE	20	Steven Wright	RFr
FS	21	Juan Thornhill	So
S	25	Chris Sharp	RFr
OLB	27	Cory Jones	So
SS	28	Wilfred Wahee	Sr
OLB	29	Eric Gallon	So
CB	31	Kareem Gibson	RFr
CB	32	Kirk Garner	Jr
DB	34	Bryce Hall	Fr
OLB	36	Gladimir Paul	RFr
DB	37	Jordan Mack	Fr
SS	38	Kelvin Rainey	Sr
DB	39	Chris Moore	Fr
ILB	40	C.J. Stalker	So
ILB	42	Jahvoni Simmons	RFr
OLB	43	Sean Fitzgerald	RFr
OLB	45	Reed Kellam	RFr
DL	49	Alec Shifflett	Jr
ILB	51	Zach Bradshaw	Sr
ILB	52	Robert Snyder	Fr
ILB	53	Micah Kiser (C)	Jr
OLB	54	Matt Terrell	Fr
DE	55	Naji Abdullah	RFr
DT	56	Andre Miles-Redmond	Sr
DT	57	James Trucilla	RFr
DE	58	Eli Hanback	RFr
DE	59	Mark Hall	Sr
S	60	C. J. Epps	RFr
CB	66	Chuck Davis	Fr
OLB	68	Dillon Davis	Fr
CB	69	Nick Grant	Fr
DE	90	Jack Powers	Jr
ILB	92	Dominic Sheppard	RFr
DE	93	Christian Baumgardner	Fr
ILB	94	Michael Guerci	So
OLB	95	Juwan Moye	Fr
ILB	98	Landan Word	Fr
DL		Christian Brooks	Fr
OLB		Dre Bryant	Fr
DL		Osiris Crutchfield	Fr
CB		Darious Latimore	So
FS		Brenton Nelson	Fr

Special teams

Pos.	#	Name	Class
P	30	Nicholas Conte	Sr
P	47	Lester Coleman	So
PK	84	Alex Furbank	So
PK	89	Sam Heyward	Jr
PK	91	Dylan Sims	Sr
PK		Nash Griffin	Fr
P		Trace Halpern	RFr
LS		Tyler Shirley	Jr

Head coach

- Bronco Mendenhall (Oregon State)

Coordinators/assistant coaches

- Robert Anae (BYU)
  Offensive coordinator, inside receivers
- Marques Hagans (Virginia)
  Wide receivers
- Mark Atuaia (BYU)
  Running backs
- Garett Tujague (BYU)
  Offensive line
- Jason Beck (BYU)
  Quarterbacks
- Ruffin McNeill (East Carolina)
  Assistant head coach, defensive line
- Nick Howell (Weber State)
  Defensive coordinator, secondary
- Kelly Poppinga (BYU)
  Special teams coordinator, outside linebackers
- Shane Hunter (BYU)
  Inside linebackers
- Patrick Hickman (BYU)
  Director of football operations
- Justin Anderson (BYU)
  Director of player personal
- Frank Wintrich (BYU)
  Director of football training & player development

Legend

- (C) Team captain
- (S) Suspended
- (I) Ineligible
- Injured
- Redshirt

Roster
Last update: August 28, 2016

=== Depth chart ===
Defense

FS
Quin Blanding
Wilfred Wahee
⋅

WLB	MLB	BLB	SLB
Chris Peace	Micah Kiser	Zach Bradshaw	Cory Jones
Gladimir Paul	C.J. Stalker	Jahvoni Simmons	Jordan Mack
⋅	⋅	⋅	Eric Gallon

SABRE
Kelvin Rainey
Chris Sharp
⋅

CB
Juan Thornhill
Bryce Hall
⋅

DE	NT	DE
Andrew Brown	Donte Wilkins	Steven Wright
Jack Powers	James Trucilla	Eli Hanback
⋅	⋅	⋅

CB
Myles Robinson
Tim Harris
⋅

Offense

WR (X)
Doni Dowling
David Eldridge
⋅

WR (H)
Olamide Zaccheaus
Ben Hogg
⋅

LT	LG	C	RG	RT
Jack English	Jake Fieler	Jackson Matteo	Jack McDonald	Eric Smith
Michael Mooney	Steven Moss	Jake Fieler	RJ Proctor	Michael Mooney
⋅	⋅	⋅	⋅	⋅

WR (Z)
Warren Craft
Ryan Santoro
⋅

WR (Y)
Keeon Johnson
Tanner Cowley
⋅

QB
Kurt Benkert
Matt Johns
Connor Brewer

Key reserves
TE Evan Butts
TE Richard Burney
TE Brendan Marshall
TB Albert Reid
FB Connor Wingo-Reeves
KOR Dylan Sims

RB
Taquan Mizzell
Daniel Hamm
Jordan Ellis

Special teams
PK Dylan Sims
P Nicholas Conte
KR Taquan Mizzell
KR Olamide Zacchaeus
PR Daniel Hamm
PR Taquan Mizzell
PR Olamide Zacchaeus
LS Zach Bradshaw
H Matt Johns
