= Taquan Mizzell =

American football player (born 1993)

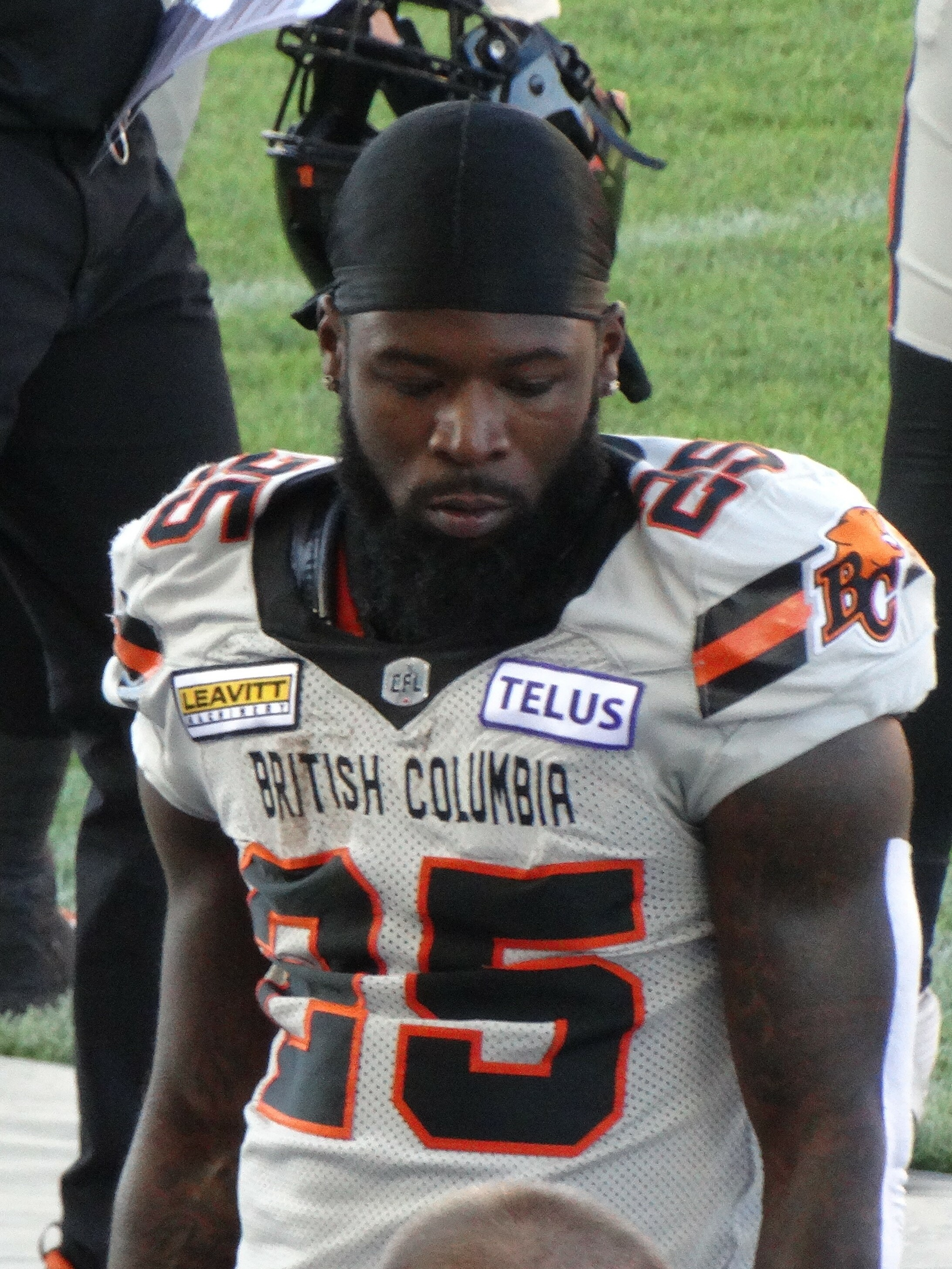
- Mizzell with the BC Lions in 2023

Profile
- Position: Running back

Personal information
- Born: October 21, 1993 (age 33); Virginia Beach, Virginia, U.S.
- Listed height: 5 ft 10 in (1.78 m)
- Listed weight: 185 lb (84 kg)

Career information
- High school: Bayside (Virginia Beach, Virginia)
- College: Virginia (2013–2016)
- NFL draft: 2017: undrafted

Career history
- Baltimore Ravens (2017)*; Chicago Bears (2017–2018); New Orleans Saints (2019–2020)*; New York Giants (2020–2021)*; BC Lions (2022–2023)
- * Offseason or practice squad member only

Career NFL statistics
- Rushing attempts: 9
- Rushing yards: 16
- Receptions: 8
- Receiving yards: 78
- Receiving touchdowns: 1
- Stats at Pro Football Reference

Taquan Mizzell Sr. (born October 21, 1993) is an American professional football running back. He played college football at the University of Virginia.

== Early life ==
Mizzell attended and played high school football at Bayside High School in Virginia Beach, Virginia.

== College career ==
Mizzell attended the University of Virginia, where he played running back. He is the only player in Atlantic Coast Conference history with 1,500+ career rushing and 1,500+ career receiving yards.

=== Collegiate statistics ===
Year	School	Conf	Class	Pos	G	Rushing				Receiving			
Year	School	Conf	Class	Pos	G	Att	Yds	Avg	TD	Rec	Yds	Avg	TD
2013	Virginia	ACC	FR	UT	10	45	184	4.1	1	29	164	5.7	1
2014	Virginia	ACC	SO	RB	12	64	280	4.4	2	39	271	6.9	0
2015	Virginia	ACC	JR	RB	12	164	664	4.0	4	75	721	9.6	4
2016	Virginia	ACC	SR	RB	12	187	940	5.0	5	52	404	7.8	2
Career	Virginia				46	460	2,068	4.5	12	195	1,560	8.0	7

== Professional career ==
Pre-draft measurables
Height	Weight	40-yard dash	10-yard split	20-yard split	20-yard shuttle	Three-cone drill	Vertical jump	Broad jump	Bench press
5 ft 9 3/4 in (1.77 m)	197 lb (89 kg)	4.55 s	1.51 s	2.67 s	4.25 s	7.00 s	34 in (0.86 m)	9 ft 6 in (2.90 m)	15 reps
All values from NFL Combine.

=== Baltimore Ravens ===
Mizzell signed with the Baltimore Ravens as an undrafted free agent on May 5, 2017. He was waived on September 2, 2017.

=== Chicago Bears ===
On September 3, 2017, Mizzell was claimed off waivers by the Chicago Bears.

On September 1, 2018, Mizzell was waived by the Bears and was signed to the practice squad the next day. He was promoted to the active roster on November 3, 2018. In his first game against the Buffalo Bills, Mizzell served as kick returner and also caught a pass for five yards. On Thanksgiving Day, Mizzell scored his first NFL touchdown on a ten-yard reception from Chase Daniel against the Detroit Lions. The following week against the New York Giants, Mizzell rushed three times for seven yards, caught two passes for sixteen yards, and returned two kicks for twenty-four yards. He ended the 2018 season with nine carries for 16 yards and eight receptions for 78 yards and a touchdown.

Before the 2019 season, Mizzell switched to wide receiver from running back; in conjunction with the position move, he changed his number from 33 to 11. He was released during final roster cuts on August 31.

=== New Orleans Saints ===
On September 1, 2019, Mizzell was signed to the New Orleans Saints practice squad. He signed a reserve/future contract with the Saints on January 7, 2020. He was waived on August 2, 2020.

=== New York Giants ===
On November 17, 2020, Mizzell was signed to the Giants' practice squad. He signed a reserve/future contract on January 4, 2021. He was placed on injured reserve on July 23, 2021, with a hamstring injury. He was later waived on July 29.

=== BC Lions ===
On April 18, 2022, Mizzell signed with the BC Lions of the Canadian Football League. In 2023, Mizzell rushed for 773 yards on 157 carries and three touchdowns for the Lions. He had an additional 291 yards and two scores on 41 pass receptions. After two years with the team, he was released on May 27, 2024.
