= Matt Johns (American football) =

American football player and coach (born 1993)

Current position
- Title: Quarterbacks
- Team: Utah State Aggies
- Conference: MW

Biographical details
- Born: July 2, 1993 (age 33)

Playing career
- 2012–2016: Virginia
- Position: Quarterback

Coaching career (HC unless noted)
- 2018: Virginia (GA)
- 2019: William & Mary (TE)
- 2020–2023: William & Mary (QB)
- 2024: New Mexico (TE)
- 2025–present: Utah State (QB)

Matt Johns (born July 2, 1993) is an American college football coach and former player. He currently serves as the quarterbacks coach for the Utah State Aggies. He played college football for the Virginia Cavaliers as a quarterback.

== Playing career ==
Johns attended Central Bucks High School South in Warrington, Pennsylvania. After his high school career, he committed to the University of Virginia to play for the Virginia Cavaliers.

Johns redshirted in 2012 before serving as the team's placekick holder in 2013. In Virginia's 2014 season opener against UCLA, Johns replaced Greyson Lambert, with the Cavaliers trailing 21–3. In relief of Lambert, he threw for 152 yards and two touchdowns, as Virginia lost 28–20. In his first career start against Kent State, Johns threw for 227 yards and two touchdowns in addition to two interceptions. He finished the 2014 season throwing for 1,109 yards, eight touchdowns, and five interceptions. Entering the 2015 season, Johns was named the team's starting quarterback. In 2015, he started all 12 games, throwing for 2,810 yards, 20 touchdowns, and 17 interceptions. Despite being the incumbent starting quarterback, Johns competed for the starting job prior to the 2016 season, with East Carolina transfer, Kurt Benkert, being named the starter. He played primarily as a reserve behind Benkert in 2016, before being named the starter against Georgia Tech. Against Georgia Tech, he threw for 220 yards and a touchdown, while also throwing three interceptions. Johns started the final game of his collegiate career against Virginia Tech.

Johns finished his career throwing for 4,233 yards, 30 touchdowns, and 27 interceptions.

=== Statistics ===
**Bold**	Career best
Italics	Led FBS

Year	Team	Games			Passing								Rushing			
Year	Team	GP	GS	Record	Comp	Att	Pct	Yards	Avg	TD	Int	Rate	Att	Yards	Avg	TD
2012	Virginia	Redshirt (redshirt)														
2013	Virginia	12	–	–	–	–	–	–	–	–	–	–	–	–	–	–
2014	Virginia	12	3	**2–1**	89	162	54.9	1,109	6.8	8	5	122.6	22	**107**	**4.9**	**1**
2015	Virginia	12	**12**	4–8	**247**	**403**	**61.3**	**2,810**	**7.0**	**20**	**17**	127.8	**61**	86	1.4	**1**
2016	Virginia	12	2	0–2	36	63	57.1	314	5.0	2	5	93.6	6	-8	-1.3	0
Career		48	17	6−11	372	628	59.2	4,233	6.7	30	27	123.0	89	185	2.1	2

== Coaching career ==
After spending a season at his alma mater as a graduate assistant, Johns joined William & Mary as a tight ends coach. After one season as the tight ends coach, he was promoted to the quarterbacks coach and passing game coordinator for the Tribe, positions he served until 2023. In December 2023, Johns joined Bronco Mendenhall's staff at New Mexico as the tight ends coach.

Johns joined Bronco Mendenhall's staff as a quarterbacks coach for the Utah State Aggies. At Utah State, Johns is assisted by two Junior Analysts, Josh Clifford & Cade Rohrbough. He is thankful for the work they do & their tenacity.
