= 2014 Virginia Cavaliers football team =

American college football season

2014 Virginia Cavaliers football
- Conference: Atlantic Coast Conference
- Coastal Division
- Record: 5–7 (3–5 ACC)
- Head coach: Mike London (5th season)
- Offensive coordinator: Steve Fairchild (2nd season)
- Offensive scheme: Pro-style
- Defensive coordinator: Jon Tenuta (2nd season)
- Base defense: 4–3
- Home stadium: Scott Stadium

2014 Atlantic Coast Conference football standings
| | Conf. | | | Overall |
| Team | W | | L | W | | L |
|---|---|---|---|---|---|---|
Atlantic Division
| No. T–5 Florida State x$^ | 8 | – | 0 | 13 | – | 1 |
| No. 15 Clemson | 6 | – | 2 | 10 | – | 3 |
| No. 24 Louisville | 5 | – | 3 | 9 | – | 4 |
| Boston College | 4 | – | 4 | 7 | – | 6 |
| NC State | 3 | – | 5 | 8 | – | 5 |
| Syracuse | 1 | – | 7 | 3 | – | 9 |
| Wake Forest | 1 | – | 7 | 3 | – | 9 |
Coastal Division
| No. 8 Georgia Tech x | 6 | – | 2 | 11 | – | 3 |
| Duke | 5 | – | 3 | 9 | – | 4 |
| North Carolina | 4 | – | 4 | 6 | – | 7 |
| Pittsburgh | 4 | – | 4 | 6 | – | 7 |
| Miami (FL) | 3 | – | 5 | 6 | – | 7 |
| Virginia Tech | 3 | – | 5 | 7 | – | 6 |
| Virginia | 3 | – | 5 | 5 | – | 7 |
Championship: Florida State 37, Georgia Tech 35
^ – College Football Playoff participant; $ – Conference champion; x – Division champion/co-champions; Rankings from AP Poll

The 2014 Virginia Cavaliers football team represented the University of Virginia in the 2014 NCAA Division I FBS football season. The Cavaliers were led by fifth year head coach Mike London and played their home games at Scott Stadium. They were members of the Coastal Division of the Atlantic Coast Conference.

Coming off of their worst season in over thirty years, Virginia attempted to rebound to bowl eligibility for the first time since 2011. Despite starting 4–2 in the front half of the season, including an upset Louisville, the Cavaliers suffered five in-conference losses, culminating in a loss to Virginia Tech. The season was the fourth losing record in Mike London's season at Virginia; however, athletic director Craig Littlepage announced prior to the final game that London would return for the 2015 season. They would finish the season 5–7, 3–5 in ACC play to finish in a three way tie for fifth place in the Coastal Division.

== Schedule ==
| Date | Time | Opponent | Site | TV | Result | Attendance |
|---|---|---|---|---|---|---|
| August 30 | 12:00 pm | No. 7 UCLA* | Scott Stadium; Charlottesville, VA | ESPN | L 20–28 | 44,749 |
| September 6 | 3:30 pm | No. 17 (FCS) Richmond* | Scott Stadium; Charlottesville, VA | ESPN3 | W 45–13 | 34,533 |
| September 13 | 12:30 pm | No. 21 Louisville | Scott Stadium; Charlottesville, VA | ACCN | W 23–21 | 34,816 |
| September 20 | 3:30 pm | at No. 21 BYU* | LaVell Edwards Stadium; Provo, UT | ESPN | L 33–41 | 59,023 |
| September 27 | 3:30 pm | Kent State* | Scott Stadium; Charlottesville, VA | ESPN3 | W 45–13 | 33,526 |
| October 4 | 7:30 pm | Pittsburgh | Scott Stadium; Charlottesville, VA | ACCRSN | W 24–19 | 43,307 |
| October 18 | 12:30 pm | at Duke | Wallace Wade Stadium; Durham, NC | ACCN | L 13–20 | 28,131 |
| October 25 | 12:30 pm | North Carolina^{†} | Scott Stadium; Charlottesville, VA (South's Oldest Rivalry) | ACCN | L 27–28 | 45,200 |
| November 1 | 3:30 pm | at Georgia Tech | Bobby Dodd Stadium; Atlanta, GA | ESPNU | L 10–35 | 46,657 |
| November 8 | 6:30 pm | at No. 2 Florida State | Doak Campbell Stadium; Tallahassee, FL (Jefferson-Eppes Trophy) | ESPN | L 20–34 | 82,325 |
| November 22 | 7:30 pm | Miami (FL) | Scott Stadium; Charlottesville, VA | ESPN2 | W 30–13 | 39,112 |
| November 28 | 8:00 pm | at Virginia Tech | Lane Stadium; Blacksburg, VA (Battle for the Commonwealth Cup) | ESPN | L 20–24 | 60,431 |
*Non-conference game; ^{†}Homecoming; Rankings from AP Poll released prior to game; All times are in Eastern time

Schedule source:

== Roster ==
2014 Virginia Cavaliers football team roster
Players
Coaches
Offense

| Pos. | # | Name | Class |
|---|---|---|---|
| C | 50 | Jackson Matteo (injured) | So |
| C | 60 | John Pond | Jr |
| C | 68 | Eric Tetlow | So |
| FB | 41 | Connor Wingo-Reeves | So |
| FB | 47 | Vincent Croce | Jr |
| G | 61 | Cody Wallace | Sr |
| G | 62 | Sean Karl | So |
| G | 63 | Ryan Doull (injured) | So |
| G | 65 | Ross Burbank | Jr |
| G | 66 | George Adeosun | RFr |
| G | 71 | Jack McDonald | RFr |
| G | 74 | Conner Davis | Sr |
| OL | 69 | Andrew Will | Fr |
| OL | 70 | Steven Moss | Fr |
| OT | 64 | Jake Fieler | Fr |
| OT | 67 | Jack English | RFr |
| OT | 72 | Eric Smith | So |
| OT | 75 | Sadiq Olanrewaju (injured) | So |
| OT | 76 | Michael Mooney | So |
| OT | 77 | Jeremiah Whitmire (injured) | Jr |
| QB | 3 | Corwin Cutler | Fr |
| QB, WR | 5 | David Watford | Jr |
| QB | 7 | Joe Spaziani | Fr |
| QB | 11 | Greyson Lambert (C) | So |
| QB | 15 | Matt Johns | So |
| QB | 16 | Brendan Marshall | RFr |
| QB | 18 | Andrew Mackay | RFr |
| RB | 4 | Taquan Mizzell | So |
| RB | 10 | Jordan Ellis | Fr |
| RB | 22 | Daniel Hamm | RFr |
| RB | 23 | Khalek Shepherd | Sr |
| RB | 25 | Kevin Parks (C) | Sr |
| RB | 26 | Anthony Calloway | RFr |
| RB | 30 | LaChaston Smith | So |
| TE | 45 | Evan Butts | Fr |
| TE | 49 | Zachary Swanson | Sr |
| TE | 82 | Mario Nixon | So |
| TE | 89 | Rob Burns | Jr |
| WR | 1 | Jamil Kamara | Fr |
| WR | 2 | Dominique Terrell | Sr |
| WR | 6 | Darius Jennings | Sr |
| WR | 8 | Ryan Santoro | RFr |
| WR | 9 | Canaan Severin | Jr |
| WR | 13 | Umar Muhammad-Wyatt | Fr |
| WR | 14 | Andre Levrone | RFr |
| WR | 17 | Miles Gooch | Sr |
| WR | 19 | Doni Dowling | Fr |
| WR | 80 | Tyler Lewris | Sr |
| WR | 81 | Jamall Brown | So |
| WR | 83 | Ben Hogg | Fr |
| WR | 85 | Keeon Johnson | So |
| WR | 87 | Kyle Dockins | So |

Defense

| Pos. | # | Name | Class |
|---|---|---|---|
| DB | 1 | Demetrious Nicholson (injured) | Sr |
| DB | 2 | Kirk Garner |
| DB | 5 | Tim Harris | So |
| DB | 11 | Divante Walker (injured) | So |
| DB | 22 | DreQuan Hoskey | Sr |
| DB | 26 | Maurice Canady | Jr |
| DB | 39 | Darious Latimore | Fr |
| DT | 9 | Andrew Brown | Fr |
| DT | 55 | David Dean | Jr |
| DT | 56 | Andre Miles-Redmond | So |
| DT | 58 | Chris Brathwaite | Sr |
| DT | 79 | Jack Babcock (injured) | RFr |
| DT | 92 | Greg Gallop | Sr |
| DT | 93 | Donte Wilkins | So |
| DE | 7 | Eli Harold | Jr |
| DE | 32 | Mike Moore | Jr |
| DE | 34 | Kwontie Moore | Jr |
| DE | 43 | Trent Corney | Jr |
| DE | 57 | Stephen Lawe | Sr |
| DE | 90 | Michael Biesemier | Fr |
| DE | 96 | Cameron Fitch | Sr |
| DL | 98 | Jordan Jackson | Fr |
| DL | 99 | Darrious Carter | Fr |
| FS | 21 | Brandon Phelps (injured) | Sr |
| FS | 25 | David Marrs | Sr |
| FS | 28 | Wilfred Wahee | So |
| S | 3 | Quin Blanding | Fr |
| S | 33 | Cordel Nelson | Fr |
| SS | 8 | Anthony Harris (C) | Sr |
| SS | 16 | Mason Thomas | Jr |
| SS | 27 | Malcolm Cook | RFr |
| SS | 38 | Kelvin Rainey (injured) | So |
| LB | 13 | Daquan Romero | Sr |
| LB | 29 | D.J. Hill | Sr |
| LB | 31 | Chris Peace | Fr |
| LB | 40 | Darius Lee | Jr |
| LB | 41 | Michael Guerci | Fr |
| LB | 44 | Henry Coley (C) | Sr |
| LB | 47 | Tucker Gamble | Fr |
| LB | 51 | Zach Bradshaw | So |
| LB | 52 | Caanan Brown | Fr |
| LB | 53 | Micah Kiser | RFr |
| LB | 54 | Cory Jones | Fr |
| LB | 59 | Mark Hall | So |
| LB | 88 | Max Valles | So |

Special teams

| Pos. | # | Name | Class |
|---|---|---|---|
| LS | 42 | Tyler Shirley | RFr |
| LS | 54 | Alex Foertsch | RFr |
| LS | 66 | Jeb Byrne | Jr |
| P | 32 | James Coleman | So |
| P | 38 | Nicholas Conte | So |
| P, PK | 30 | Alec Vozenilek (C) | Sr |
| PK | 14 | Ian Frye | Jr |
| PK | 28 | Willem van Reesema | So |
| PK | 91 | Dylan Sims | So |
| K | 92 | Andrew King | Fr |
| K | 93 | Lester Coleman | Fr |

Head coach

- Mike London (Richmond, 1982)

Coordinators/assistant coaches

- Tom O'Brien (Navy, 1970)
  Associate head coach for offense/tight ends
- Jon Tenuta (Virginia, 1982)
  Associate head coach for defense/defensive coordinator/linebackers
- Steve Fairchild (Colorado State, 1980)
  Offensive coordinator/quarterbacks
- Jappy Oliver (Purdue, 1978)
  Defensive line
- Mike Archer (Miami (FL), 1976)
  Safeties
- Larry Lewis (Boise State, 1980)
  Running Backs, Special Teams coordinator
- Marques Hagans (Virginia, 2005)
  Wide receivers
- Scott Wachenheim (Air Force, 1984)
  Offensive line
- Chip West (Livingstone College, 1993)
  Cornerbacks/recruiting coordinator
- Ryan Tedford (Sam Houston State, 1995)
  Dir. of Football Training & Player Development

Legend

- (C) Team captain
- (S) Suspended
- (I) Ineligible
- Injured
- Redshirt

Roster
Last update: September 14, 2014

=== Depth chart ===
Defense

FS
Quin Blanding
Wilfred Wahee
David Marrs

| WLB | MLB | SLB |
|---|---|---|
| Daquan Romero | Henry Coley | Max Valles |
| DJ Hill | Micah Kiser | Zach Bradshaw |
| ⋅ | ⋅ | ⋅ |

SS
Anthony Harris
Kelvin Rainey
⋅

CB
Tim Harris
DreQuan Hoskey
Brandon Phelps

| DE | DT | DT | DE |
|---|---|---|---|
| Eli Harold | Donte Wilkins | David Dean | Mike Moore |
| Trent Corney | Andrew Brown | Greg Gallop | Kwontie Moore |
| Cameron Fitch | Andre Miles-Redmond | ⋅ | ⋅ |

CB
Maurice Canady
DreQuan Hoskey
Divante Walker

Offense

X-Receiver
Darius Jennings
Andre Levrone
Doni Dowling

| LT | LG | C | RG | RT |
|---|---|---|---|---|
| Michael Mooney | Cody Wallace | Ross Burbank | Conner Davis | Eric Smith |
| Jack English | Sean Karl | Jack McDonald | Cody Wallace | Sean Karl |
| ⋅ | ⋅ | ⋅ | ⋅ | ⋅ |

TE
Zachary Swanson
Rob Burns

Z-Receiver
Canaan Severin
Keeon Johnson
Kyle Dockins

QB
Greyson Lambert
Matt Johns
David Watford

Key reserves
WR (Z) Jamil Kamara
RB Daniel Hamm
LS Alex Foertsch
PR Taquan Mizzell
KR Taquan Mizzell
KR Khalek Shepherd
KO Dylan Sims

RB
Kevin Parks
Taquan Mizzell
Khalek Shepherd

FB
Connor Wingo-Reeves
Vincent Croce
⋅

Special teams
PK Ian Frye
PK Alec Vozenilek
P Alec Vozenilek
P Nicholas Conte
KR Darius Jennings
PR Khalek Shepherd
LS Tyler Shirley
H Matt Johns

== Game summaries ==
=== UCLA ===
UCLA Bruins vs Virginia Cavaliers

| Quarter | 1 | 2 | 3 | 4 | Total |
|---|---|---|---|---|---|
| #7 UCLA | 0 | 21 | 7 | 0 | 28 |
| Virginia | 0 | 10 | 7 | 3 | 20 |

at Scott Stadium • Charlottesville, VA

- Date: August 30, 2014
- Game time: 12:00 PM EDT
- Game weather: Temperature: 77 °F (25 °C) • Wind: S 8 mph • Weather: Overcast
- Game attendance: 44,749
- Referee: Jack Folliard • Umpire: Doug Wilson • Linesman: Bob Day • Line judge: Jeff Robinson • Back judge: Steve Hudson • Field judge: Brad Glenn • Side judge: Aaron Santi
- TV announcers (ESPN): Bob Wischusen, Matt Millen, Quint Kessenich
- UCLA vs Virginia (Aug 30, 2014)

Game information

First Quarter

- No scoring.

Second Quarter

- UCLA – Ishmael Adams 20–yard interception of Greyson Lambert pass (Kaim Fairbairn kick)
- VIRGINIA – Ian Frye 35–yard field goal
- UCLA – Randall Goforth 75–yard fumble return (Fairbairn kick)
- UCLA – Eric Kendricks 37–yard interception return (Fairbairn kick)
- VIRGINIA – Andre Levrone 29–yard pass from Matt Johns (Frye kick)

Third Quarter

- VIRGINIA – Darius Jennings 23–yard pass from Johns (Frye kick)
- UCLA – Brett Hundley 6–yard run (Fairbairn kick)

Fourth Quarter

- VIRGINIA – Frye 27–yard field goal

Top Passers

- UCLA – Brett Hundley, 20/33, 242 yards
- VIRGINIA – Matt Johns, 13/22, 154 yards, 2 TD

Top Rushers

- UCLA – Paul Perkins, 16 carries / 80 yards
- VIRGINIA – Kevin Parks, 17 carries / 55 yards

Top Receiving

- UCLA – Jordan Payton, 8 receptions / 98 yards
- VIRGINIA – Andre Levrone, 3 receptions / 75 yards

Top Tackler

- UCLA – Eric Kendricks, 16 tackles
- VIRGINIA – Henry Coley, 14 tackles

=== Richmond ===
Richmond Spiders vs Virginia Cavaliers

| Quarter | 1 | 2 | 3 | 4 | Total |
|---|---|---|---|---|---|
| #17 (FCS) Richmond | 3 | 0 | 10 | 0 | 13 |
| Virginia | 7 | 7 | 17 | 14 | 45 |

at Scott Stadium • Charlottesville, VA

- Date: September 6, 2014
- Game time: 3:30 PM EDT
- Game weather: Temperature: 89 °F (32 °C) • Wind: Not reported • Weather: Hot and muggy
- Game attendance: 34,533
- Referee: Ron Cherry • Umpire: Tom Laverty • Linesman: Joseph Griesser • Line judge: Colin Formulak • Back judge: Brian McGready • Field judge: Mark Furtado • Side judge: Richard Wilborn
- TV announcers (ESPN3): Wayne Randazzo, John Gregory
- Richmond vs Virginia (Sep 06, 2014)

Game information

First Quarter

- RICHMOND – Peter Yoder 28–yard field goal
- VIRGINIA – Kevin Parks 3–yard run (Ian Frye kick)

Second Quarter

- VIRGINIA – Canaan Severin 4–yard pass from Matt Johns (Frye kick)

Third Quarter

- VIRGINIA – Taquan Mizzell 3–yard run (Frye kick)
- RICHMOND – Yoder 32–yard field goal
- VIRGINIA – Frye 22–yard field goal
- VIRGINIA – Eli Harold 22–yard fumble recovery (Frye kick)
- RICHMOND – Michael Rocco 6–yard run (Mac McCall kick)

Fourth Quarter

- VIRGINIA – Severin 29–yard pass from Greyson Lambert (Frye kick)
- VIRGINIA – Daniel Hamm 1–yard run (Frye kick)

Top Passers

- RICHMOND – Michael Strauss, 24/36, 266 yards
- VIRGINIA – Greyson Lambert, 13/15, 102 yards

Top Rushers

- RICHMOND – Jeremiah Hamlin, 6 carries / 46 yards
- VIRGINIA – Kevin Parks, 13 carries / 52 yards

Top Receiving

- RICHMOND – Stephen Barnette, 10 receptions / 124 yards
- VIRGINIA – Taquan Mizzell, 5 receptions / 26 yards

Top Tackler

- RICHMOND – Eric Wright, 12 tackles
- VIRGINIA – Daquan Romero, 12 tackles

=== Louisville ===
Louisville Cardinals vs Virginia Cavaliers

| Quarter | 1 | 2 | 3 | 4 | Total |
|---|---|---|---|---|---|
| #21 Louisville | 7 | 0 | 0 | 14 | 21 |
| Virginia | 7 | 3 | 10 | 3 | 23 |

at Scott Stadium • Charlottesville, VA

- Date: September 13, 2014
- Game time: 12:30 PM EDT
- Game weather: Temperature: 66 °F (19 °C) • Wind: WSW 3 mph • Weather: Cloudy, damp
- Game attendance: 34,816
- Referee: Dennis Hennigan • Umpire: David Goodwin • Linesman: John Hoffman • Line judge: Rick Page • Back judge: Gary Dancewicz • Field judge: Billy Beckett • Side judge: Watts Key
- TV announcers (ACCN): Tim Brant, David Archer, Rachel Baribeau
- Louisville vs Virginia (Sep 13, 2014)

Game information

First Quarter

- LOUISVILLE – Charles Standberry 9–yard pass from Will Gardner (John Wallace kick)
- VIRGINIA – Miles Gooch 15–yard pass from Greyson Lambert (Ian Frye kick)

Second Quarter

- VIRGINIA – Frye 35–yard field goal

Third Quarter

- VIRGINIA – Lambert 10–yard rush (Frye kick)
- VIRGINIA – Frye 47–yard field goal

Fourth Quarter

- LOUISVILLE – Dominique Brown 6–yard rush (Wallace kick)
- LOUISVILLE – James Quick 4–yard pass from Will Gardner (Wallace kick)
- VIRGINIA – Frye 42–yard field goal

Top Passers

- LOUISVILLE – Will Gardner, 14/34, 164 yards, 2 TDs, 2 INTs
- VIRGINIA – Greyson Lambert, 13/24, 162 yards, 1 TD, 1 INT

Top Rushers

- LOUISVILLE – Dominique Brown, 20 carries, 74 yards, 1 TD
- VIRGINIA – Kevin Parks, 22 carries, 66 yards

Top Receiving

- LOUISVILLE – James Quick, 5 receptions, 34 yards, 1 TD
- VIRGINIA – Miles Gooch, 4 receptions, 78 yards, 1 TD

Top Tackler

- LOUISVILLE – Keith Kelsey, 11 tackles
- VIRGINIA – Quin Blanding, 9 tackles

=== BYU ===
Virginia Cavaliers vs BYU Cougars

| Quarter | 1 | 2 | 3 | 4 | Total |
|---|---|---|---|---|---|
| Virginia | 7 | 9 | 0 | 17 | 33 |
| #21 BYU | 3 | 10 | 14 | 14 | 41 |

at LaVell Edwards Stadium • Provo, UT

- Date: September 20, 2014
- Game time: 3:30 PM EDT
- Game weather: Temperature: 73 °F (23 °C) • Wind: N 6 mph • Weather: Sunny and Clear
- Game attendance: 59,023
- Referee: Jerry Magallane • Umpire: Terrence Ramsey • Linesman: Kavin McGrath • Line judge: Tommy Giles • Back judge: Robert Luklan • Field judge: Bill Dolbow • Side judge: Michael McCarth
- TV announcers (ESPN; BYUtv): Bob Wischusen, Matt Millen, & Quint Kessenich (ESPN)
  Dave McCann, Blaine Fowler, Andy Boyce, & Lauren Francom (BYUtv)
- Virginia vs BYU (Sep 20, 2014)

Game information

First Quarter

- VIRGINIA – Greyson Lambert 1–yard rush (Ian Frye kick)
- BYU – Trevor Samson 28–yard field goal

Second Quarter

- VIRGINIA – Frye 23–yard field goal
- BYU – Jordan Leslie 8–yard pass from Taysom Hill (Samson kick)
- VIRGINIA – Frye 41–yard field goal
- BYU – Samson 37–yard field goal
- VIRGINIA – Ian Frye 22–yard field goal

Third Quarter

- BYU – Hill 15–yard rush (Samson kick)
- BYU – Jamaal Williams 2–yard rush (Samson kick)

Fourth Quarter

- VIRGINIA – Frye 46–yard field goal
- BYU – Mitchell Juergens 50–yard pass from Hill (Samson kick)
- VIRGINIA – Khalek Shepherd 9–yard rush (Frye kick)
- BYU – Adam Hine 99–yard kickoff return (Samson kick)
- VIRGINIA – Kyle Dockins 11–yard pass from Matt Johns (Frye kick)

Top Passers

- BYU – Taysom Hill, 13/23, 187 yards, 2 TD's
- VIRGINIA – Greyson Lambert, 21/35, 188 yards, 1 INT; Matt Johns, 14/23, 139 yards, 1 TD

Top Rushers

- BYU – Hill, 17 carries, 72 yards, 1 TD
- VIRGINIA – Khalek Shepherd, 14 carries, 73 yards, 1 TD

Top Receiving

- BYU – Devon Blackmon, 2 receptions, 55 yards
- VIRGINIA – Miles Gooch, 6 receptions, 65 yards

Top Tackler

- BYU – Craig Bills, 10 tackles
- VIRGINIA – Quinn Blanding & Daquan Romero, 8 tackles

=== Kent State ===
Kent State Golden Flashes vs Virginia Cavaliers

| Quarter | 1 | 2 | 3 | 4 | Total |
|---|---|---|---|---|---|
| Kent State | 10 | 0 | 0 | 3 | 13 |
| Virginia | 7 | 7 | 17 | 14 | 45 |

at Scott Stadium • Charlottesville, VA

- Date: September 27, 2014
- Game time: 3:30 PM
- Game weather: Temperature: 78 °F (26 °C) • Wind: ENE 5 mph • Weather: Sunny and clear
- Game attendance: 33,526
- Referee: Stuart Mullins • Umpire: Marvin Wilson • Linesman: Arthur Hardin • Line judge: Robert Bassett • Back judge: Paul Vargo • Field judge: Kip Johnson • Side judge: D. Harrison
- TV announcers (ESPN3): Sean Kenney, Al Groh
- Kent State vs Virginia (Sep 27, 2014)

Game information

First Quarter

- KENT STATE – James Brooks 45–yard pass from Colin Reardon (Anthony Melchiori kick)
- VIRGINIA – Maurice Canady 69–yard interception return (Ian Frye kick)
- KENT STATE – Melchiori 31–yard field goal

Second Quarter

- VIRGINIA – Khalek Shepherd 25–yard pass from Matt Johns (Frye kick)

Third Quarter

- VIRGINIA – Frye 22–yard field goal
- VIRGINIA – Kevin Parks 4–yard rush (Frye kick)
- VIRGINIA – Johns 1–yard rush (Frye kick)

Fourth Quarter

- VIRGINIA – Parks 11–yard pass from Johns (Frye kick)
- VIRGINIA – Mizzell 2–yard rush (Frye kick)
- KENT STATE – Melchiori 43–yard field goal

Top Passers

- KENT STATE – Colin Reardon, 15/32, 239 yards, 1 TD, 3 INTs
- VIRGINIA – Matt Johns, 17/28, 227 yards, 2 TDs, 1 INT

Top Rushers

- KENT STATE – Nick Holley, 14 carries, 36 yards
- VIRGINIA – Johns, 5 carries, 65 yards, 1 TD; Kevin Parks, 12 carries, 61 yards, 1 TD

Top Receiving

- KENT STATE – James Brooks, 3 receptions, 76 yards, 1 TD
- VIRGINIA – Canaan Severin, 5 receptions, 60 yards

Top Tackler

- KENT STATE – Nate Holley, 15 tackles
- VIRGINIA – Quin Blanding, 13 tackles

=== Pittsburgh ===
Pittsburgh Panthers vs Virginia Cavaliers

| Quarter | 1 | 2 | 3 | 4 | Total |
|---|---|---|---|---|---|
| Pittsburgh | 3 | 0 | 10 | 6 | 19 |
| Virginia | 3 | 21 | 0 | 0 | 24 |

at Scott Stadium • Charlottesville, VA

- Date: October 4, 2014
- Game time: 7:30 PM EDT
- Game weather: Temperature: 55 °F (13 °C) • Wind: NW 11 mph • Weather: Clear
- Game attendance: 43,307
- Referee: Walt Davenport • Umpire: David Goodwin • Linesman: Mike Pavese • Line judge: Robert Zivkovic • Back judge: Scot Maslin • Field judge: Tom Potts • Side judge: Jim Corpora
- TV announcers (ACCRSN): Wes Durham, James Bates, Jenn Hildreth
- Pitt vs Virginia (Oct 04, 2014)

Game information

First Quarter

- VIRGINIA – Ian Frye 33–yard field goal
- PITTSBURGH – Chris Blewitt 36–yard field goal

Second Quarter

- VIRGINIA – Kevin Parks 48–yard rush (Frye kick)
- VIRGINIA – Khalek Shepherd 3–yard pass from Matt Johns (Frye kick)
- VIRGINIA – Max Valles 35–yard interception return (Frye kick)

Third Quarter

- PITTSBURGH – Manasseh Garner 17–yard pass from Chad Voytik (Blewitt kick)
- PITTSBURGH – Blewitt 24–yard field goal

Fourth Quarter

- PITTSBURGH – J.P. Holtz 6–yard pass from Voytik (two-point conversion failed)

Top Passers

- PITTSBURGH – Chad Voytik, 16/30, 2 TDs, 1 INT
- VIRGINIA – Matt Johns, 9/16, 93 yards, 1 TD, 1 INT

Top Rushers

- PITTSBURGH – James Conner, 21 carries, 83 yards
- VIRGINIA – Kevin Parks, 29 carries, 169 yards, 1 TD

Top Receiving

- PITTSBURGH – J.P. Holtz, 4 receptions, 40 yards, 1 TD; Tyler Boyd, 3 receptions, 63 yards
- VIRGINIA – Miles Gooch, 3 receptions, 42 yards

Top Tackler

- PITTSBURGH – Todd Thomas, 12 tackles
- VIRGINIA – Quin Blanding, 15 tackles

=== Duke ===
Virginia Cavaliers vs Duke Blue Devils

| Quarter | 1 | 2 | 3 | 4 | Total |
|---|---|---|---|---|---|
| Virginia | 0 | 10 | 3 | 0 | 13 |
| Duke | 7 | 3 | 3 | 7 | 20 |

at Wallace Wade Stadium • Durham, NC

- Date: October 18, 2014
- Game time: 12:30 PM EDT
- Game weather: Temperature: 76 °F (24 °C) • Wind: WNW 10 mph • Weather: Sunny
- Game attendance: 28,131
- Referee: Jeff Heaser • Umpire: Danny Worrell • Linesman: Joseph Griesser • Line judge: Richard Misner • Back judge: Jacques Hooper • Field judge: Mike Cullin • Side judge: Jerry Hocker • Alternate: David Goodwin
- TV announcers (ACCN): Tim Brant, David Archer, Rachel Baribeau
- Virginia vs Duke (Oct 18, 2014)

Game information

First Quarter

- DUKE – Erich Schneider 1–yard pass from Anthony Boone (Ross Martin kick)

Second Quarter

- DUKE – Martin 19–yard field goal
- VIRGINIA – Khalek Shepherd 5–yard pass from Matt Johns (Ian Frye kick)
- VIRGINIA – Frye 21–yard field goal

Third Quarter

- DUKE – Martin 25–yard field goal
- VIRGINIA – Frye 30–yard field goal

Fourth Quarter

- DUKE – David Reeves 3–yard pass from Thomas Sirk (Martin kick)

Top Passers

- DUKE – Anthony Boone, 22/37, 176 yards, 1 TD
- VIRGINIA – Matt Johns, 22/45, 325 yards, 1 TD

Top Rushers

- DUKE – Shaquille Powell, 11 carries, 68 yards
- VIRGINIA – Kevin Parks, 16 carries, 75 yards

Top Receiving

- DUKE – Jamison Crowder, 8 receptions, 99 yards • David Reeves, 2 receptions, 11 yards, 1 TD
- VIRGINIA – Miles Gooch, 6 receptions, 129 yards • Khalek Shepherd, 1 reception, 5 yards, 1 TD

Top Tackler

- DUKE – David Helton, 14 tackles
- VIRGINIA – Anthony Harris, 14 tackles

=== North Carolina ===
119th South's Oldest Rivalry: North Carolina Tar Heels vs Virginia Cavaliers

| Quarter | 1 | 2 | 3 | 4 | Total |
|---|---|---|---|---|---|
| North Carolina | 14 | 7 | 0 | 7 | 28 |
| Virginia | 14 | 10 | 3 | 0 | 27 |

at Scott Stadium • Charlottesville, VA

- Date: October 25, 2014
- Game time: 12:30 PM EDT
- Game weather: Temperature: 68 °F (20 °C) • Wind: S 7 mph • Weather: Sunny
- Game attendance: 45,200
- Referee: Gary Patterson • Umpire: Rich McMahan • Linesman: Michael Kelley • Line judge: Deon Lawrence • Back judge: H.Wittelsberger • Field judge: Harry Tyson • Side judge: Tony Tarantini
- TV announcers (ACCN): Tim Brant, David Archer, Rachel Baribeau
- North Carolina vs Virginia (Oct 25, 2014)

Game information

First Quarter

- VIRGINIA – Canaan Severin 31–yard pass from Greyson Lambert (Ian Frye kick)
- VIRGINIA – Kevin Parks 2–yard rush (Frye kick)
- NORTH CAROLINA – Marquise Williams 52–yard rush (Nick Weiler kick)
- NORTH CAROLINA – Mack Hollins 57–yard pass from Williams (Weiler kick)

Second Quarter

- VIRGINIA – Parks 5–yard pass from Lambert (Frye kick)
- NORTH CAROLINA – Hollins 63–yard pass from Williams (Weiler kick)
- VIRGINIA – Frye 31–yard field goal

Third Quarter

- VIRGINIA – Frye 37–yard field goal

Fourth Quarter

- NORTH CAROLINA – T.J. Thorpe 16–yard pass from Mitch Trubisky (Weiler kick)

Top Passers

- NORTH CAROLINA – Marquise Williams, 15/29, 259 yards, 2 TDs, 1 INT
- VIRGINIA – Greyson Lambert, 20/40, 261 yards, 2 TDs, 2 INTs

Top Rushers

- NORTH CAROLINA – Marquise Williams, 17 carries, 49 yards, 1 TD
- VIRGINIA – Kevin Parks, 25 carries, 111 yards, 1 TD

Top Receiving

- NORTH CAROLINA – T.J. Logan, 3 receptions, 9 yards • Mack Hollins, 2 receptions, 120 yards, 2 TDs
- VIRGINIA – Kevin Parks, 4 receptions, 19 yards, 1 TD • Darius Jennings, 3 receptions, 82 yards

Top Tackler

- NORTH CAROLINA – Tim Scott, 9 tackles
- VIRGINIA – Henry Coley, 10 tackles

=== Georgia Tech ===
Virginia Cavaliers vs Georgia Tech Yellow Jackets

| Quarter | 1 | 2 | 3 | 4 | Total |
|---|---|---|---|---|---|
| Virginia | 7 | 3 | 0 | 0 | 10 |
| Georgia Tech | 14 | 7 | 7 | 7 | 35 |

at Bobby Dodd Stadium • Atlanta, GA

- Date: November 1, 2014
- Game time: 3:30 PM EDT
- Game weather: Temperature: 49 °F (9 °C) • Wind: NW 24 mph • Weather: Cloudy, windy
- Game attendance: 46,657
- Referee: David Epperley • Umpire: Michael Webster • Linesman: Steve Clein • Line judge: Richard Misner • Back judge: Pat Ryan • Field judge: Chris Junjulas • Side judge: Eddie Bonet • Alternate: S. Disangro
- TV announcers (ESPNU): Anish Shroff, Kelly Stouffer
- Virginia vs Georgia Tech (Nov 1, 2014)

Game information

First Quarter

- GEORGIA TECH – Deon Hill 14–yard rush (Harrison Butker kick)
- GEORGIA TECH – DeAndre Smelter 18–yard pass from Justin Thomas (Butker kick)
- VIRGINIA – Zachary Swanson 13–yard pass from Greyson Lambert (Ian Frye kick)

Second Quarter

- GEORGIA TECH – Darren Waller 11–yard pass from Thomas (Butker kick)
- VIRGINIA – Frye 22–yard field goal

Third Quarter

- GEORGIA TECH – Synjyn Days 4–yard rush (Butker kick)

Fourth Quarter

- GEORGIA TECH – Days 17–yard pass from Thomas (Butker kick)

Top Passers

- GEORGIA TECH – Justin Thomas, 7/13, 141 yards, 3 TDs, 1 INT
- VIRGINIA – Greyson Lambert, 19/32, 230 yards, 1 TD, 2 INTs

Top Rushers

- GEORGIA TECH – Synjyn Days, 24 carries, 147 yards, 1 TD
- VIRGINIA – Khalek Shepherd, 4 carries, 15 yards

Top Receiving

- GEORGIA TECH – DeAndre Smelter, 4 receptions, 107 yards, 1 TD
- VIRGINIA – Canaan Severin, 5 receptions, 64 yards

Top Tackler

- GEORGIA TECH – D.J. White, 6 tackles
- VIRGINIA – Quin Blanding, 13 tackles

=== Florida State ===
Virginia Cavaliers vs Florida State Seminoles

| Quarter | 1 | 2 | 3 | 4 | Total |
|---|---|---|---|---|---|
| Virginia | 13 | 0 | 7 | 0 | 20 |
| Florida State | 7 | 21 | 6 | 0 | 34 |

at Doak Campbell Stadium • Tallahassee, FL

- Date: November 8, 2014
- Game time: 6:30 PM EST
- Game weather: Temperature: 60 °F (16 °C) • Wind: Calm • Weather: Partly cloudy
- Game attendance: 82,325
- Referee: Jerry Magallane • Umpire: Terrance Ramsey • Linesman: Matt Fitzgerald • Line judge: Tommy Giles • Back judge: Robert Luklan • Field judge: Milton Britton • Side judge: Mike McCarthy
- TV announcers (ESPN): Joe Tessitore, Brock Huard, Shannon Spake
- Virginia vs Florida State (Nov 08, 2014)

Game information

First Quarter

- FLORIDA STATE – Karlos Williams 2–yard rush (Roberto Aguayo kick)
- VIRGINIA – Andre Levrone 16–yard pass from Greyson Lambert (Ian Frye kick)
- VIRGINIA – Darius Jennings 15–yard pass from Lambert (Frye kick no good)

Second Quarter

- FLORIDA STATE – Williams 3–yard rush (Aguayo kick)
- FLORIDA STATE – Rashad Greene 22–yard pass from Jameis Winston (Aguayo kick)
- FLORIDA STATE – Winston 5–yard rush (Aguayo kick)

Third Quarter

- VIRGINIA – Canaan Severin 23–yard pass from Lambert (Frye kick)
- FLORIDA STATE – Aguayo 43–yard field goal
- FLORIDA STATE – Aguayo 40–yard field goal

Fourth Quarter

- No scoring.

Top Passers

- FLORIDA STATE – Jameis Winston, 22/35, 261 yards, 1 TD, 2 INTs
- VIRGINIA – Greyson Lambert, 20/35, 220 yards, 3 TDs, 1 INT

Top Rushers

- FLORIDA STATE – Karlos Williams, 21 carries, 70 yards, 2 TDs
- VIRGINIA – Kevin Parks, 15 carries, 43 yards

Top Receiving

- FLORIDA STATE – Rashad Greene, 13 receptions, 136 yards, 1 TD
- VIRGINIA – Canaan Severin, 4 receptions, 56 yards, 1 TD

Top Tackler

- FLORIDA STATE – Mario Edwards Jr., 9 tackles
- VIRGINIA – Quin Blanding, 13 tackles

=== Miami (FL) ===
Miami Hurricanes vs Virginia Cavaliers

| Quarter | 1 | 2 | 3 | 4 | Total |
|---|---|---|---|---|---|
| Miami (FL) | 7 | 0 | 0 | 6 | 13 |
| Virginia | 0 | 13 | 7 | 10 | 30 |

at Scott Stadium • Charlottesville, VA

- Date: November 22, 2014
- Game time: 7:00 PM EST
- Game weather: Temperature: 42 °F (6 °C) • Wind: SSW 10 mph • Weather: Clear
- Game attendance: 39,112
- Referee: Dennis Hennigan • Umpire: Troy Riley • Linesman: John Hoffman • Line judge: Rick Page • Back judge: Gary Dancewicz • Field judge: Billy Beckett • Side judge: Watts Key
- TV announcers (ESPN2): Joe Tessitore, Brock Huard, Shannon Spake
- Miami (Fla.) vs Virginia (Nov 22, 2014)

Game information

First Quarter

- MIAMI (FL) – Phillip Dorsett 47–yard pass from Brad Kaaya (Michael Badgley kick)

Second Quarter

- VIRGINIA – Ian Frye 20–yard field goal
- VIRGINIA – Canaan Severin 23–yard pass from Greyson Lambert (Frye kick)
- VIRGINIA – Frye 18–yard field goal

Third Quarter

- VIRGINIA – Darius Jennings 1–yard rush (Frye kick)

Fourth Quarter

- VIRGINIA – Frye 22–yard field goal
- VIRGINIA – Khalek Shepherd 4–yard rush (Frye kick)
- MIAMI (FL) – Hugo Delepenha 13–yard blocked punt return (two-point conversion failed)

Top Passers

- MIAMI (FL) – Brad Kaaya, 20/33, 263 yards, 1 TD, 1 INT
- VIRGINIA – Greyson Lambert, 17/25, 146 yards, 1 TD, 1 INT

Top Rushers

- MIAMI (FL) – Duke Johnson, 15 carries, 88 yards
- VIRGINIA – Khalek Shepherd, 22 carries, 95 yards, 1 TD

Top Receiving

- MIAMI (FL) – Clive Walford, 7 receptions, 105 yards • Phillip Dorsett, 3 receptions, 61 yards, 1 TD
- VIRGINIA – Khalek Shepherd, 5 receptions, 16 yards • Canaan Severin, 4 receptions, 55 yards, 1 TD

Top Tackler

- MIAMI (FL) – Denzel Perryman, 15 tackles
- VIRGINIA – Anthony Harris, 10 tackles

=== Virginia Tech ===
96th Battle for the Commonwealth Cup: Virginia Cavaliers vs Virginia Tech Hokies

| Quarter | 1 | 2 | 3 | 4 | Total |
|---|---|---|---|---|---|
| Virginia | 3 | 10 | 0 | 7 | 20 |
| Virginia Tech | 3 | 7 | 7 | 7 | 24 |

at Lane Stadium • Blacksburg, VA

- Date: November 28, 2014
- Game time: 8:00 PM EST
- Game weather: Temperature: 27 °F (−3 °C) • Wind: W 2 mph • Weather: Cold, partly cloudy
- Game attendance: 60,431
- Referee: J. Magallanes • Umpire: Terrence Ramsey • Linesman: Troy Gray • Line judge: Tommy Giles • Back judge: Robert Luklan • Field judge: Bill Dolbow • Side judge: Angie Bartis • Alternate: Tom McCreesh
- TV announcers (ESPN): Dave Flemming, Danny Kanell, Allison Williams
- Virginia vs Virginia Tech (Nov 28, 2014)

Game information

First Quarter

- VIRGINIA TECH – Joey Slye 22–yard field goal
- VIRGINIA – Ian Frye 40–yard field goal

Second Quarter

- VIRGINIA TECH – Bucky Hodges punt recovery inside the Virginia end zone (Slye kick)
- VIRGINIA – Frye 21–yard field goal
- VIRGINIA – David Dean 3–yard interception return (Frye kick)

Third Quarter

- VIRGINIA TECH – Cam Phillips 36–yard pass from Michael Brewer (Slye kick)

Fourth Quarter

- VIRGINIA – Zachary Swanson 20–pass from Greyson Lambert (Frye kick)
- VIRGINIA TECH – Hodges 9–yard pass from Brewer (Slye kick)

Top Passers

- VIRGINIA TECH – Michael Brewer, 15/33, 235 yards, 2 TDs, 1 INT
- VIRGINIA – Greyson Lambert, 15/32, 211 yards, 1 TD, 1 INT

Top Rushers

- VIRGINIA TECH – J. C. Coleman, 18 carries, 118 yards
- VIRGINIA – Kevin Parks, 21 carries, 70 yards

Top Receiving

- VIRGINIA TECH – Cam Phillips, 5 receptions, 73 yards, 1 TD
- VIRGINIA – Canaan Severin, 4 receptions, 82 yards • Zachary Swanson, 3 receptions, 34 yards, 1 TD

Top Tackler

- VIRGINIA TECH – Chase Williams, 12 tackles
- VIRGINIA – Quin Blanding, 14 tackles
