= Olamide Zaccheaus =

American football player (born 1997)

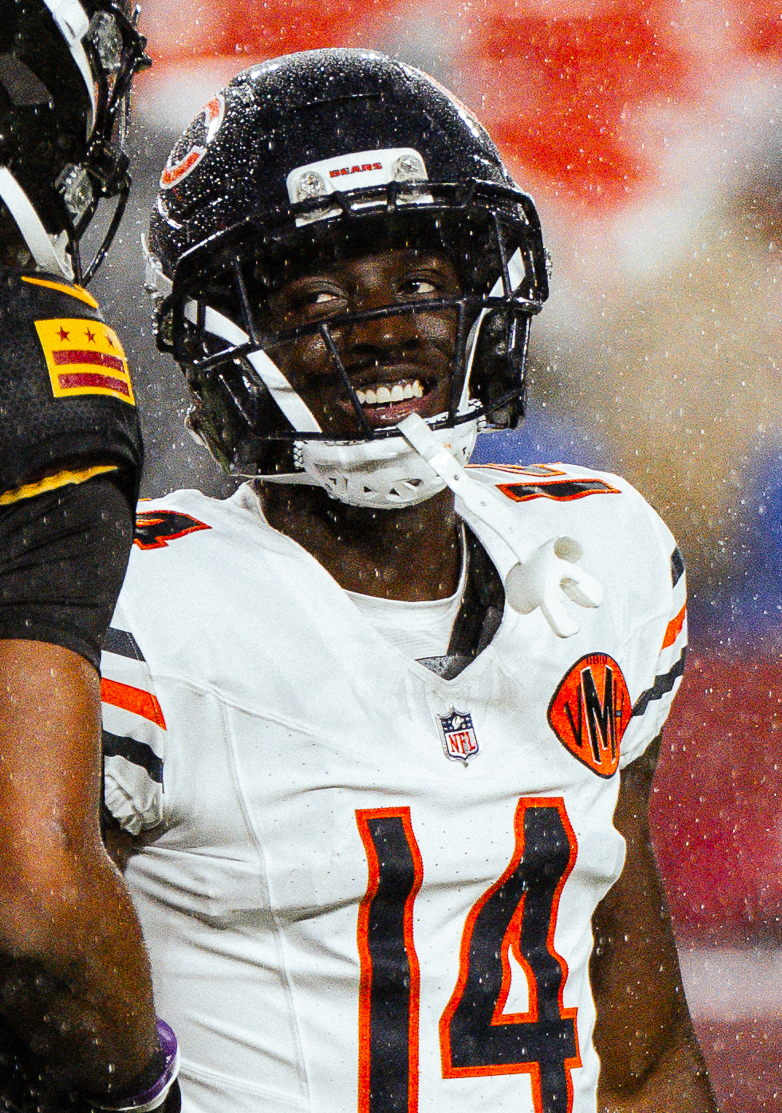
- Zaccheaus with the Chicago Bears in 2025

No. 14 – Atlanta Falcons
- Position: Wide receiver
- Roster status: Active

Personal information
- Born: July 23, 1997 (age 29); Plainfield, New Jersey, U.S.
- Listed height: 5 ft 8 in (1.73 m)
- Listed weight: 194 lb (88 kg)

Career information
- High school: St. Joseph's Preparatory (Philadelphia, Pennsylvania)
- College: Virginia (2015–2018)
- NFL draft: 2019: undrafted

Career history
- Atlanta Falcons (2019–2022); Philadelphia Eagles (2023); Washington Commanders (2024); Chicago Bears (2025); Atlanta Falcons (2026–present)

Awards and highlights
- First-team All-ACC (2018); Second-team All-ACC (2017)

Career NFL statistics as of Week 4, 2026
- Receptions: 192
- Receiving yards: 2,328
- Receiving touchdowns: 15
- Stats at Pro Football Reference

Olamide David Zaccheaus (/oʊˈlɑːmɪdeɪ zɑːˈkiːjʌs/ oh-LAH-mih-day zah-KEE-us; born July 23, 1997) is an American professional football wide receiver for the Atlanta Falcons of the National Football League (NFL). He played college football for the Virginia Cavaliers and has also played in the NFL for the Philadelphia Eagles, Washington Commanders, and Chicago Bears.

== Early life ==
Zaccheaus was born on July 23, 1997, in Plainfield, New Jersey. At age seven, he moved to Magnolia, New Jersey in Camden County, New Jersey. He played high school football at St. Joseph's Preparatory School in Philadelphia. Zaccheaus is of Nigerian descent.

== College career ==
Zaccheaus was a member of the Virginia Cavaliers for four seasons. He was named second team All-Atlantic Coast Conference (ACC) after catching 85 passes for 895 yards and five touchdowns as a junior.

As a senior, Zaccheaus led the ACC with 93 receptions for 1,058 yards and nine touchdowns and was named first team All-ACC.

He was named the Most Valuable Player of the 2018 Belk Bowl, his final game as a Cavalier, after making 12 receptions for 100 yards receiving and three touchdowns.

Zaccheaus finished his collegiate career with 250 receptions for 2,753 yards and 22 touchdowns while also rushing 79 times for 551 yards and two touchdowns in 50 games played.

=== Statistics ===
Year	Team	Games		Receiving				Rushing			
Year	Team	GP	GS	Rec	Yds	Avg	TD	Att	Yds	Avg	TD
2015	Virginia	12	4	21	216	10.3	1	33	262	7.9	1
2016	Virginia	12	7	51	584	11.5	7	3	24	8.0	0
2017	Virginia	13	2	85	895	10.5	5	27	182	6.7	1
2018	Virginia	13	12	93	1,058	11.4	9	16	83	5.2	0
Career		50	25	250	2,753	11.0	22	79	551	7.0	2

== Professional career ==
Pre-draft measurables
Height	Weight	Arm length	Hand span	Wingspan	40-yard dash	10-yard split	20-yard split	20-yard shuttle	Three-cone drill	Vertical jump	Broad jump	Bench press
5 ft 8 1/4 in (1.73 m)	188 lb (85 kg)	31 in (0.79 m)	8 3/4 in (0.22 m)	6 ft 1 1/4 in (1.86 m)	4.49 s	1.58 s	2.62 s	4.19 s	7.00 s	35.5 in (0.90 m)	10 ft 5 in (3.18 m)	12 reps
All values from Pro Day

=== Atlanta Falcons (first stint) ===
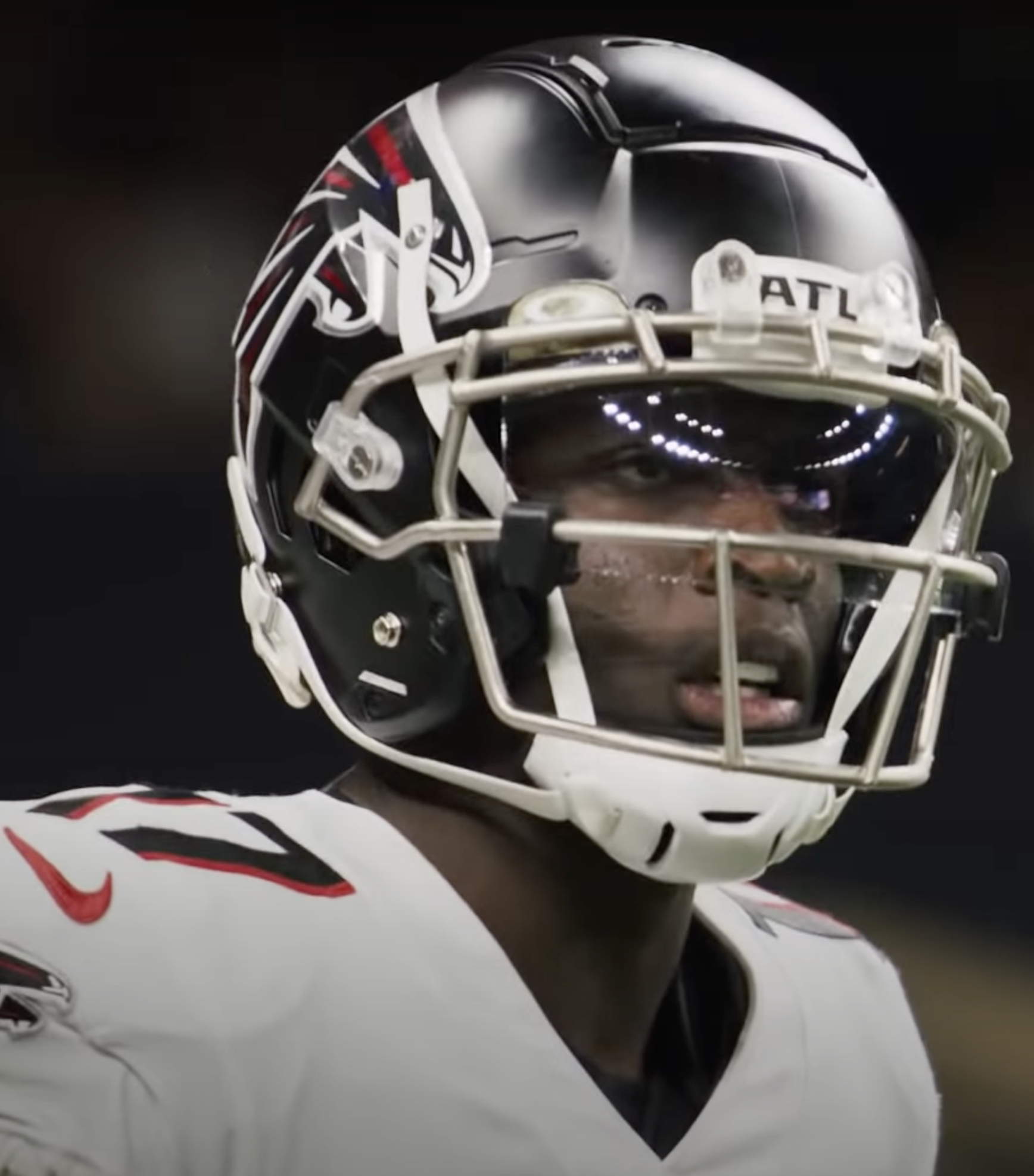
Zaccheaus with the Atlanta Falcons in 2021

Zaccheaus signed with the Atlanta Falcons as an undrafted free agent on April 27, 2019, and made the 53-man roster out of training camp. Zaccheaus made his NFL debut on October 13, 2019, against the Arizona Cardinals, making a tackle on special teams. In the Falcons' 40–20 victory against the Carolina Panthers on December 8, 2019, Zaccheaus recorded his first reception in the NFL, a 93-yard touchdown pass from Matt Ryan, which was the third-longest reception in franchise history, and set an NFL record for the longest first catch. In Week 15 against the San Francisco 49ers, Zaccheaus returned a fumble for a touchdown in the closing seconds of the 29–22 win. Zaccheaus finished his rookie season with three receptions for 115 yards and a touchdown on offense and two tackles and a fumble recovery for a touchdown on special teams.

In Week 9 of the 2020 season against the Denver Broncos, Zaccheaus had his first 100-yard game with four receptions for 103 receiving yards and a touchdown in the 34–27 victory. He was placed on injured reserve on December 1, 2020. Zaccheaus finished the season with 20 receptions for 274 yards and one touchdown in 11 games played.

In Week 8 of the 2021 season against the New Orleans Saints, Zaccheaus had three receptions for 58 yards and a career-high two touchdowns in the 27–25 win. Zaccheaus finished the season with 31 receptions for 406 yards and three touchdowns.

On March 15, 2022, the Falcons placed a restricted free agent tender on Zaccheaus. On April 19, 2022, Zaccheaus signed his right-of-refusal tender, ensuring his return to the Falcons. Zaccheaus played in all 17 games, of which he started 13. He finished with 40 receptions for 533 receiving yards and three receiving touchdowns.

=== Philadelphia Eagles ===
On April 20, 2023, Zaccheaus signed a one-year deal with the Philadelphia Eagles. He finished the season with 10 receptions for 164 receiving yards and 2 touchdowns.

=== Washington Commanders ===
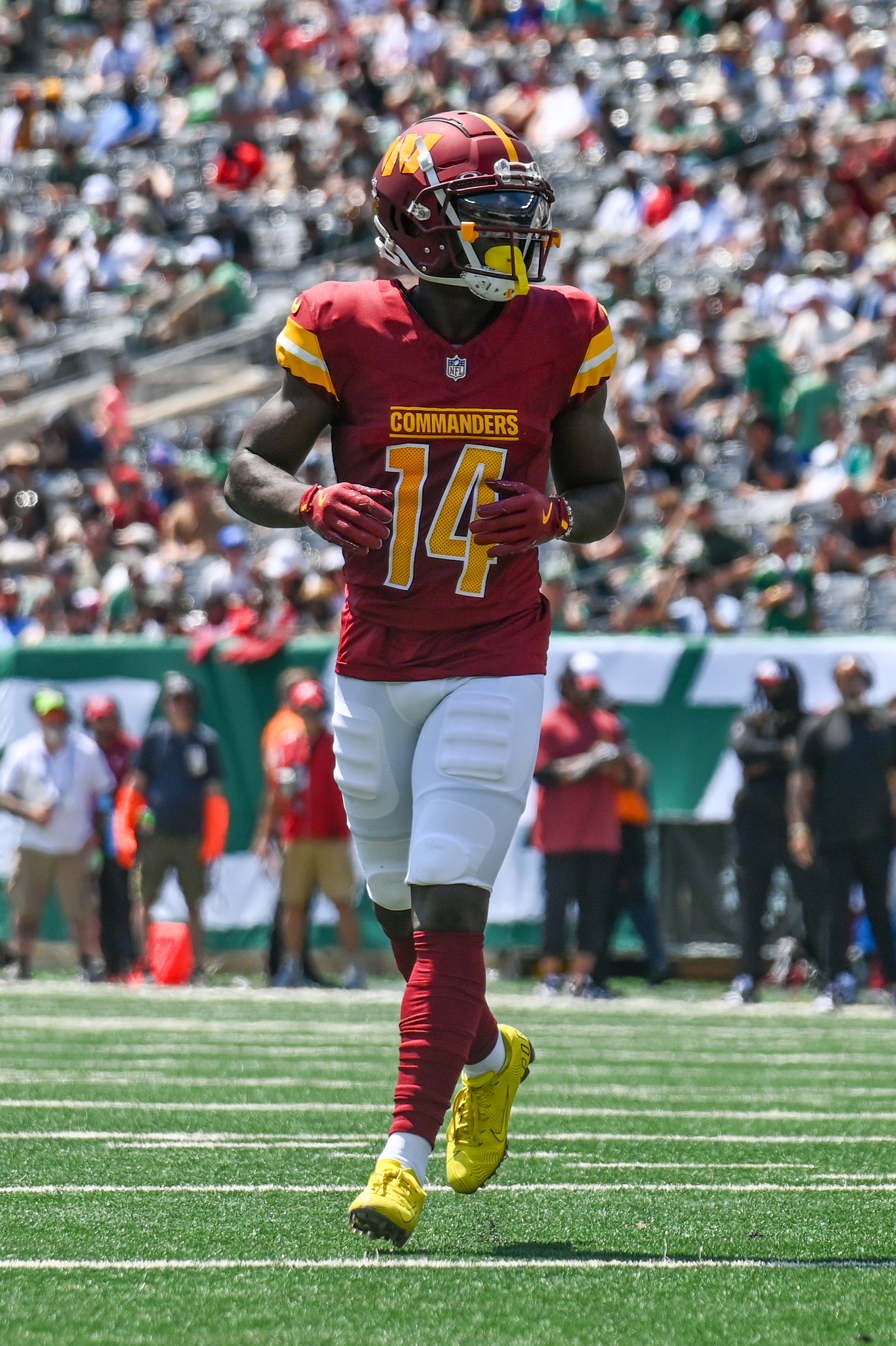
Zaccheaus playing for the Washington Commanders in 2024

On April 1, 2024, Zaccheaus signed with the Washington Commanders. This reunited him with head coach Dan Quinn, who was Zaccheaus' head coach for his first two seasons with the Falcons. In Week 16 of the 2024 season against his former team, the Eagles, Zaccheaus recorded five catches for 70 yards and two touchdowns in the 36-33 win. The following week's win against the Falcons, Zaccheaus led the Commanders in both receptions and receiving yards with eight catches for 85 yards along with scoring a touchdown.

=== Chicago Bears ===
On March 13, 2025, Zaccheaus signed a one-year contract with the Chicago Bears. He played in 16 games with five starts, recording 39 catches for 313 yards and two touchdowns.

=== Atlanta Falcons (second stint) ===
On March 17, 2026, Zaccheaus signed a two-year, $4.5 million contract with the Atlanta Falcons.
