= Chris Glaser (American football) =

American football player (born 1999)

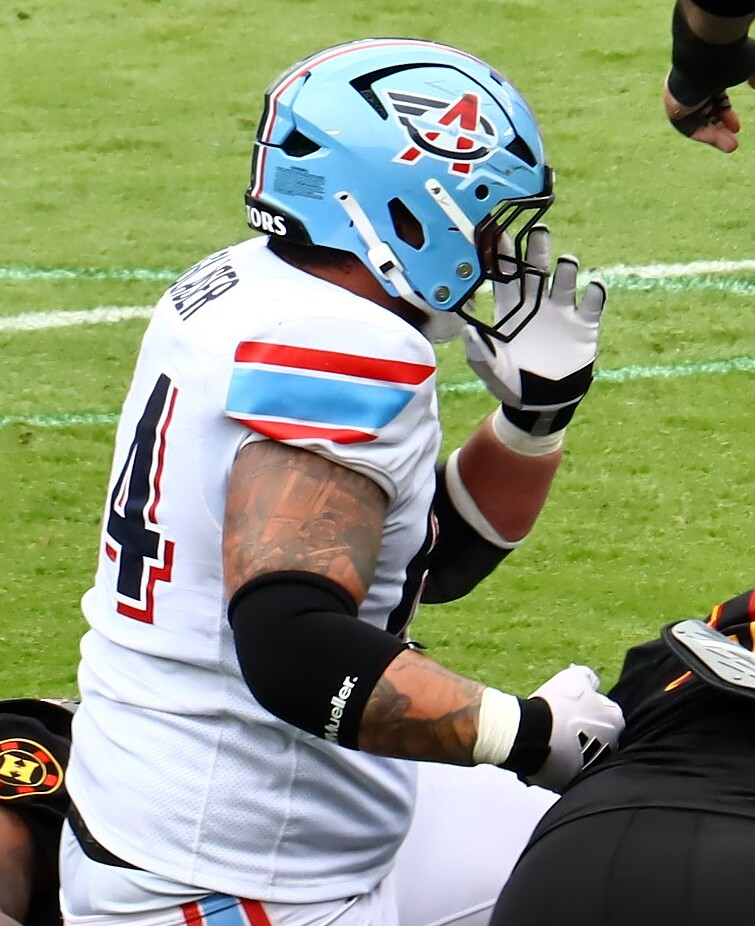
- Glaser with the Columbus Aviators in 2026

Profile
- Position: Offensive guard

Personal information
- Born: October 1, 1999 (age 27); Honolulu, Hawaii, U.S.
- Listed height: 6 ft 4 in (1.93 m)
- Listed weight: 306 lb (139 kg)

Career information
- High school: Solon (Solon, Ohio)
- College: Virginia (2017–2021)
- NFL draft: 2022: undrafted

Career history
- Kansas City Chiefs (2022)*; New York Jets (2022–2023); Dallas Cowboys (2023)*; New York Jets (2023); Chicago Bears (2024); Columbus Aviators (2026); Dallas Cowboys (2026)*
- * Offseason or practice squad member only

Career NFL statistics as of 2024
- Games played: 8
- Games started: 1
- Stats at Pro Football Reference

Chris Glaser (born October 1, 1999) is an American professional football offensive guard. He played college football for the Virginia Cavaliers from 2017 to 2021. Glaser was signed by the Kansas City Chiefs as an undrafted free agent in 2022. He has also spent time on the rosters of the New York Jets and Dallas Cowboys.

== Early life ==
Glaser was born on October 1, 1999, in Honolulu, Hawaii, before later moving to Ohio. He attended Solon High School in Solon, Ohio, where he was ranked a three-star recruit and received close to a dozen scholarship offers. Ranked by 247Sports as the 62nd-best player in the state, he initially committed to play college football for the Miami RedHawks before switching to the Virginia Cavaliers.

== College career ==
As a true freshman at Virginia in 2017, Glaser saw no action through the first eight games and decided to redshirt; however, that week, injuries allowed him to see action in practice on the first team and Glaser then decided against redshirting. He appeared in five late-season games and started two at right tackle, being one of 17 true freshman to see playing time and one of just two on the offensive line. The following season, Glaser played 13 games, seven as a starter, at left guard, additionally seeing action at right guard. In 2019, he played 14 games and started 13 of them. In 2020, he started all 10 games, being named honorable mention All-Atlantic Coast Conference (ACC), and helped Virginia's offensive line allow the least tackles-for-loss in the in ACC, a mark that placed 12th nationally; he also helped them rank second in the conference for fewest sacks allowed per game, while Glaser himself allowed only one sack with 20 pancake blocks in conference play. After being given an extra year of eligibility due to the COVID-19 pandemic, he returned for a final season in 2021. In his last year, Glaser started every game and was part of an offensive line that blocked for a Virginia offense setting school records for passing offense and total offense. Pro Football Network (PFN) named him honorable mention All-American. He finished his college career having appeared in 54 games, 44 as a starter.

== Professional career ==
Pre-draft measurables
Height	Weight	Arm length	Hand span	Wingspan	40-yard dash	10-yard split	20-yard split	20-yard shuttle	Three-cone drill	Vertical jump	Bench press
6 ft 4 in (1.93 m)	306 lb (139 kg)	32 in (0.81 m)	10 1/4 in (0.26 m)	6 ft 6 in (1.98 m)	5.21 s	1.80 s	2.87 s	4.64 s	7.37 s	27.5 in (0.70 m)	29 reps
All values from Pro Day

=== Kansas City Chiefs ===
After going unselected in the 2022 NFL draft, Glaser signed with the Kansas City Chiefs as an undrafted free agent following a successful mini-camp tryout. He was waived on August 2, 2022.

=== New York Jets (first stint) ===
On August 9, 2022, Glaser was signed by the New York Jets. He was released at the final roster cuts, on August 30, and re-signed to the practice squad the following day. He was released from the practice squad on September 21, re-signed on October 19, released again on November 26, and then re-signed on December 6. He signed a reserve/future contract on January 9, 2023.

Glaser was released at the final roster on August 29, 2023, later re-joining the team on the practice squad on September 22. He was elevated to the active roster for the team's Week 3 game against the New England Patriots, but saw no action in the loss. He was elevated for a second time for the team's Week 4 game against the Chiefs, but did not play in that game either. Glaser was released from the practice squad on October 3.

=== Dallas Cowboys ===
On October 24, 2023, Glaser was signed to the Dallas Cowboys' practice squad.

=== New York Jets (second stint) ===
Glaser was signed off the Cowboys practice squad to the Jets active roster on November 1, 2023. He made his NFL debut by appearing on one snap in the team's 27–6 loss against the Los Angeles Chargers, later earning his first start two games later in a loss to the Buffalo Bills. Glaser was released on November 23. He was re-signed to the practice squad on November 27. He was promoted to the active roster on January 6, 2024. He finished the season with five games played, one as a starter.

Glaser was waived on August 27, 2024.

=== Chicago Bears ===
On August 29, 2024, Glaser was signed to the Chicago Bears practice squad. He signed a reserve/future contract with Chicago on January 6, 2025.

On August 24, 2025, Glaser was waived by the Bears as part of final roster cuts.

=== Columbus Aviators ===
On January 14, 2026, Glaser was selected by the Columbus Aviators of the United Football League (UFL).

=== Dallas Cowboys (second stint) ===
On June 18, 2026, Glaser signed with the Dallas Cowboys. On August 30, he was waived by the Cowboys as a part of final roster cuts.
