= Kurt Benkert =

American football player (born 1995)

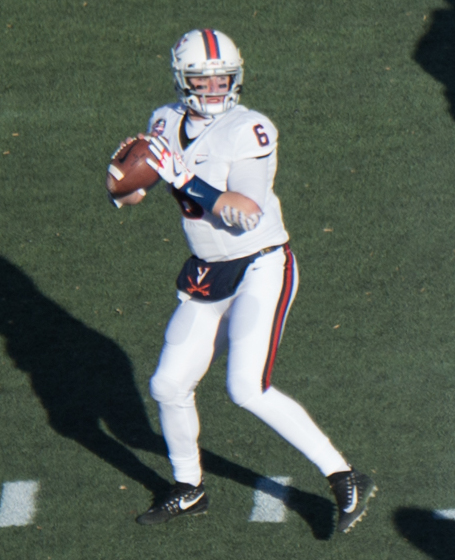
- Benkert with Virginia at the 2017 Military Bowl

No. 6, 14, 13
- Position: Quarterback

Personal information
- Born: July 17, 1995 (age 31); Baltimore, Maryland, U.S.
- Listed height: 6 ft 3 in (1.91 m)
- Listed weight: 218 lb (99 kg)

Career information
- High school: Island Coast (Cape Coral, Florida)
- College: East Carolina (2013–2015); Virginia (2016–2017)
- NFL draft: 2018: undrafted

Career history
- Atlanta Falcons (2018–2020); Green Bay Packers (2021); San Francisco 49ers (2022)*; San Antonio Brahmas (2023)
- * Offseason or practice squad member only

Career XFL statistics
- TD–INT: 1–2
- Passing yards: 181
- Completion percentage: 62.2
- Passer rating: 60.8
- Stats at Pro Football Reference

Kurt Benkert

Twitch information
- Channel: kurtbenkert
- Years active: 2019–present
- Followers: 53,641

YouTube information
- Channel: Kurt Benkert
- Years active: 2021–present
- Genres: Football; Gaming
- Subscribers: 444,000
- Views: 157 million
- Last updated: September 24, 2026

Kurt Benkert (born July 17, 1995) is an American former professional football player who was a quarterback in the National Football League (NFL). He played college football for the East Carolina Pirates and Virginia Cavaliers. He signed with the Atlanta Falcons of the National Football League (NFL) as an undrafted free agent following the 2018 NFL draft; he was also a member of the Green Bay Packers and San Francisco 49ers. After being assigned to the Houston Roughnecks, he announced he would not play for the league, but was traded to the San Antonio Brahmas midway through the season.

== Early life ==
Benkert attended Cape Coral High School in Cape Coral, Florida, and transferred to Island Coast High School in Cape Coral prior to his senior year. As a senior, he passed for 2,261 yards with 20 touchdowns. He committed to East Carolina University to play college football.

== College career ==
After redshirting his first year at East Carolina in 2013, Benkert appeared in three games in 2014, completing eight of 10 passes for 58 yards and an interception. He was named East Carolina's starting quarterback heading into 2015, however he suffered a torn ACL before the season. In May 2016, he transferred to the University of Virginia.

In his first year at Virginia, Benkert was named the starting quarterback. He completed 228 of 406 passes for 2,552 yards, 21 touchdowns and 11 interceptions. In the third game of his senior season in 2017, Benkert broke the school record for passing yards in a game with 455.

== Professional career ==
Pre-draft measurables
Height	Weight	Arm length	Hand span	40-yard dash	20-yard shuttle	Three-cone drill	Vertical jump	Broad jump	Bench press
6 ft 2 5/8 in (1.90 m)	218 lb (99 kg)	31 in (0.79 m)	9 1/2 in (0.24 m)	4.95 s	4.33 s	7.15 s	31.0 in (0.79 m)	9 ft 4 in (2.84 m)	16 reps
All values from NFL Combine

=== Atlanta Falcons ===
Benkert signed with the Atlanta Falcons as an undrafted free agent on May 1, 2018. He was waived on September 1, 2018, and was signed to the practice squad the next day. He signed a reserve/future contract with the Falcons on December 31, 2018.

On August 6, 2019, Benkert was placed on injured reserve after suffering a toe injury in the preseason.

On September 5, 2020, Benkert was waived by the Falcons and was signed to the practice squad the next day. He was elevated to the active roster on November 21 for the team's week 11 game against the New Orleans Saints, and reverted to the practice squad after the game. He signed a reserve/future contract on January 4, 2021, but was waived on February 18, 2021.

=== Green Bay Packers ===
On May 17, 2021, Benkert signed with the Green Bay Packers. On August 31, 2021, Packers released Benkert as part of their final roster cuts. He was signed to the practice squad the next day. Benkert was elevated to the active roster on December 7, 2021, to replace Jordan Love, who had been placed on the reserve/COVID-19 list the day before. He saw the field for the first time in his professional career on December 12, kneeling the ball twice in the closing seconds of a 45–30 win over the Chicago Bears.

On January 25, 2022, he signed a reserve/future contract with the Packers. On June 17, Benkert was released by the Packers.

=== San Francisco 49ers ===
On September 20, 2022, Benkert signed with the San Francisco 49ers practice squad. He was released on October 12. He re-signed to the team's practice squad on October 18, 2022. On November 15, 2022, Benkert was released from the team again.

=== San Antonio Brahmas ===
On December 12, 2022, Benkert was assigned to the Houston Roughnecks of the XFL. In a public statement, Benkert stated that, after initially seeking to join the league, he had chosen not to sign a contract, stating that it "no longer feels like the right (opportunity) to pursue" and that the decision was "the fault of no one" with Benkert stating he would instead spend spring 2023 out of football with his family. The Roughnecks retained his rights in the league.

On March 23, 2023, the Roughnecks traded Benkert's player rights to the San Antonio Brahmas following an injury to Reid Sinnett.

Benkert's debut in the XFL came in relief of starter Jawon Pass. Benkert completed one of his six attempts for two yards and an interception in the team's 15–9 win over the Arlington Renegades. He earned his first start for the team's following game against the Vegas Vipers. He started the game off by throwing a one-yard touchdown pass to Fred Brown. Late in the first half Benkert was hit following a throw and suffered three broken ribs, but did not leave the game. He was eventually taken out late in the fourth in favor of Pass. Benkert was placed on the Reserve List on April 4, 2023.

Benkert announced his retirement on August 26, 2023.

== Career statistics ==
=== NFL ===
Year	Team	Games		Passing								Rushing			
Year	Team	GP	GS	Cmp	Att	Pct	Yds	Y/A	TD	Int	Rtg	Att	Yds	Avg	TD
2018	ATL	Did not play													
2019	ATL	Did not play													
2020	ATL	Did not play													
2021	GB	1	0	0	0	0.0	0	0.0	0	0	0.0	2	-1	-0.5	0
2022	SF	Did not play													
Total		1	0	0	0	0	0	0	0	0	0	2	-1	-0.5	0

=== XFL ===
Year	League	Team	Games			Passing								Rushing			
Year	League	Team	GP	GS	Record	Cmp	Att	Pct	Yds	Avg	TD	Int	Rtg	Att	Yds	Avg	TD
2023	XFL	SA	2	1	0–1	23	37	62.2	181	4.9	1	2	60.8	4	12	3.0	0

=== College ===
Season	Team	Games			Passing								Rushing			
Season	Team	GP	GS	Record	Comp	Att	Pct	Yards	Avg	TD	Int	Rate	Att	Yards	Avg	TD
2013	East Carolina	Redshirt (redshirt)														
2014	East Carolina	3	0	0–0	8	10	80.0	58	5.8	0	1	108.7	5	23	4.6	2
2015	East Carolina	DNP (injury—knee)														
2016	Virginia	11	10	2–8	228	406	56.2	2,552	6.3	21	11	120.6	60	-94	-1.6	0
2017	Virginia	13	13	6–7	298	509	58.5	3,207	6.3	25	9	124.1	65	-63	-1.0	0
Career		27	23	8−15	534	925	57.7	5,817	6.3	46	21	122.4	130	-134	-1.0	2

== Esports career ==
Benkert signed with Spacestation Gaming. He is an alternate for the Spacestation Gaming Halo team.

== Personal life ==
Benkert married Samantha Morreal on July 2, 2016. The two have a daughter together.

== YouTube career ==
On April 1, 2017, Benkert started his YouTube channel. On April 8, 2021, he uploaded his first video Titled "Kurt Benkert 2017 College Highlights." As of June 27, 2026, he has over 408,000 subscribers and over 145,000,000 views. Benkert's content mostly focuses on playing or teaching the popular video game series Madden NFL.
