= Chris Peace (American football) =

American football player and coach (born 1996)

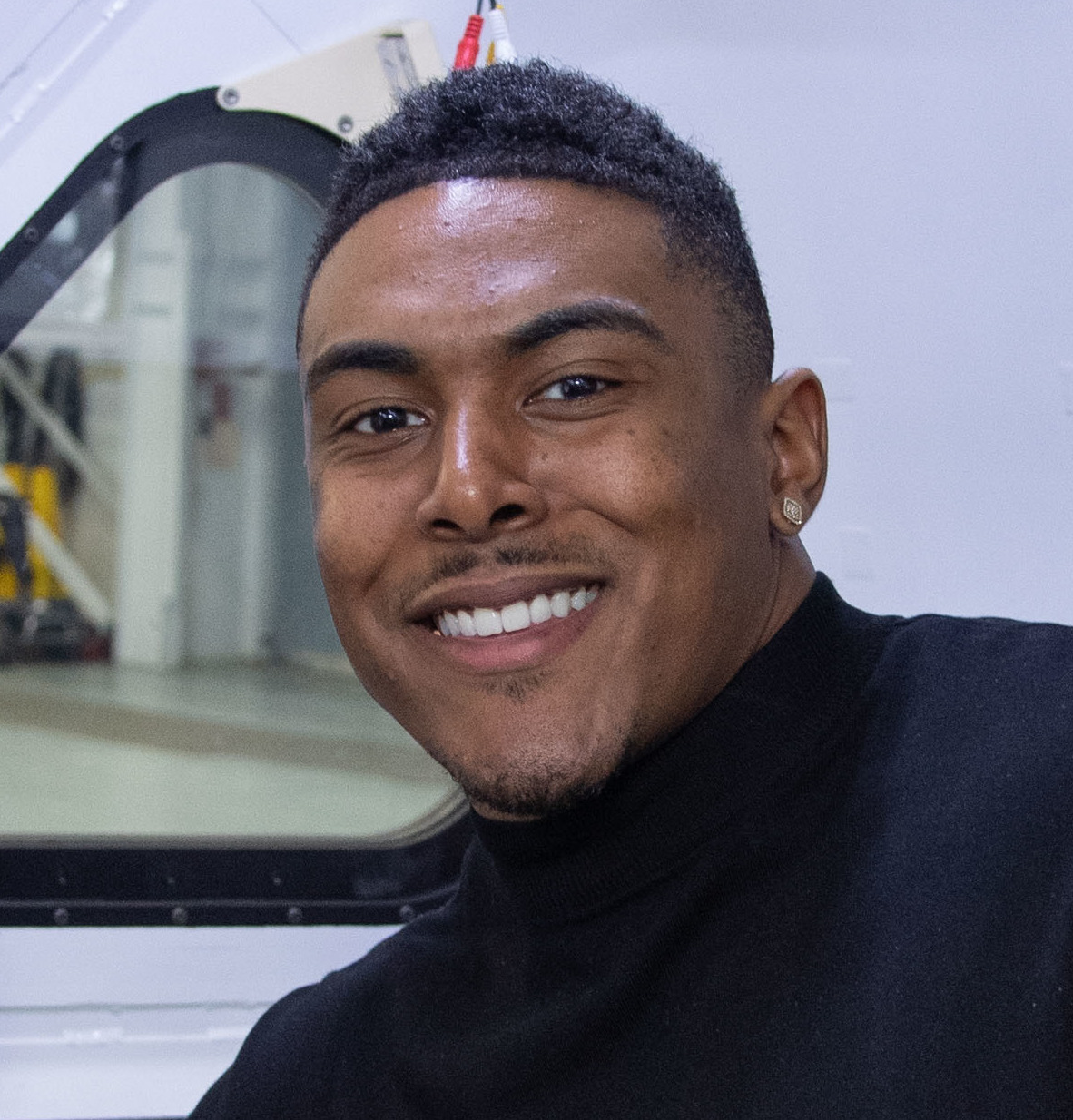
- Peace in 2020

Utah State Aggies
- Title: Junior defensive analyst

Personal information
- Born: February 8, 1996 (age 30); Norfolk, Virginia, U.S.
- Listed height: 6 ft 2 in (1.88 m)
- Listed weight: 250 lb (113 kg)

Career information
- High school: Denbigh High School (Newport News, Virginia)
- College: Virginia
- NFL draft: 2019: undrafted

Career history

Playing
- Los Angeles Chargers (2019); New York Giants (2019)

Coaching
- Virginia (2021) Graduate assistant; Utah State (2025–present) Junior defensive analyst

Awards and highlights
- Third-team All-ACC (2018)
- Stats at Pro Football Reference

Christopher Aziz Peace (born February 8, 1996) is an American former professional football player who was an outside linebacker in the National Football League (NFL). He played college football for the Virginia Cavaliers and in the NFL for the Los Angeles Chargers and New York Giants.

== Early life ==
Peace was born in Norfolk, Virginia and grew up mostly in Chesapeake, Virginia. He attended Indian River High School through his sophomore year before transferring Warwick High School after his family moved to Newport News, Virginia. He transferred again to Denbigh High School before his senior year and was moved to linebacker after playing wide receiver and safety and recorded 20 sacks.

== College career ==
Peace spent five seasons as a member of the Virginia Cavaliers, redshirting his freshman season. As a redshirt freshman he played in 12 in all 12 of the Cavaliers' games, mostly as a reserve linebacker except for one start. The next season, Peace became a starter at outside linebacker and finished 5th on the team with 53 tackles and third with 6.5 tackles for loss and 2.0 sacks. As a redshirt junior, Peace was named honorable mention All-Atlantic Coast Conference (ACC) after tallying 68 tackles, 7.5 sacks (5th-most in the conference and most by a linebacker), and 10.5 tackles for a loss. In his final season at Virginia, he made 65 tackles (11.5 for loss) and again led all ACC linebackers with 7.5 sacks and was named third-team All-ACC.

== Professional career ==
=== Los Angeles Chargers ===
Peace signed with the Los Angeles Chargers as an undrafted free agent on April 27, 2019. He made his NFL debut on September 8, 2019, in the Chargers' season opener against the Indianapolis Colts. He was waived on September 14, 2019, but was re-signed three days later. He was waived again on September 28, 2019.

=== New York Giants ===
On September 30, 2019, Peace was claimed off waivers by the New York Giants. He was placed on season ending injured reserve on December 7, 2019. Peace played in five games (one with the Chargers and four with the Giants) during his rookie season. He was waived on August 2, 2020.

Peace had a tryout with the Tennessee Titans on August 22, 2020.

== Coaching career ==
Peace returned to Virginia as a defensive graduate assistant prior to the team's 2021 season.
