= Micah Kiser =

American football player (born 1995)

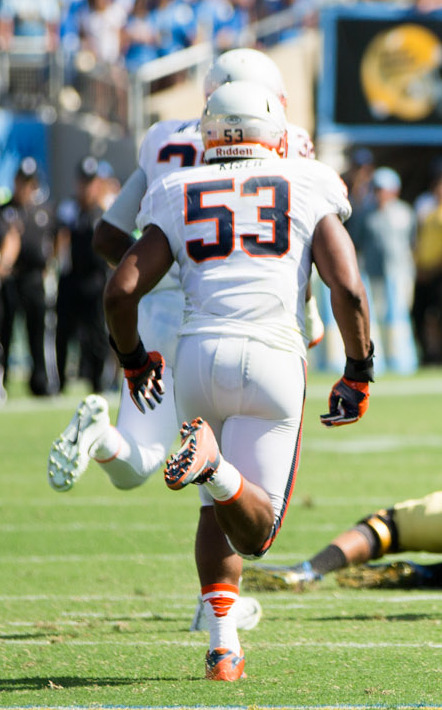
- Kiser with the Virginia Cavaliers in 2015

No. 59, 43
- Position: Linebacker

Personal information
- Born: January 25, 1995 (age 31); Baltimore, Maryland, U.S.
- Listed height: 6 ft 0 in (1.83 m)
- Listed weight: 244 lb (111 kg)

Career information
- High school: Gilman (Baltimore)
- College: Virginia
- NFL draft: 2018: 5th round, 147th overall pick

Career history
- Los Angeles Rams (2018–2021); Denver Broncos (2021); Las Vegas Raiders (2022)

Awards and highlights
- First-team All-American (2017); William V. Campbell Trophy (2017); 3× First-team All-ACC (2015, 2016, 2017)

Career NFL statistics
- Total tackles: 100
- Pass deflections: 3
- Forced fumbles: 1
- Stats at Pro Football Reference

Micah Kiser (born January 25, 1995) is an American former professional football player who was a linebacker in the National Football League (NFL). He played college football for the Virginia Cavaliers, and was selected by the Los Angeles Rams in the 2018 NFL draft. He has also played for the Denver Broncos.

== Early life ==
Kiser attended the Gilman School in Baltimore, Maryland. He committed to the University of Virginia to play college football.

== College career ==
Kiser played college football for Virginia from 2013 to 2017. As a senior, he won the William V. Campbell Trophy and was named an All-American by the Sporting News. During his career, he had 408 tackles, 19 sacks, and one interception.

== Professional career ==
Pre-draft measurables
Height	Weight	Arm length	Hand span	40-yard dash	10-yard split	20-yard split	20-yard shuttle	Three-cone drill	Vertical jump	Broad jump
6 ft 0 3/8 in (1.84 m)	238 lb (108 kg)	32 in (0.81 m)	9 3/8 in (0.24 m)	4.66 s	1.62 s	2.71 s	4.24 s	7.05 s	35 1/2 in (0.90 m)	10 ft 1 in (3.07 m)
All values from NFL Combine

=== Los Angeles Rams ===
Kiser was drafted by the Los Angeles Rams in the fifth round (147th overall) of the 2018 NFL draft.

Kiser was placed on injured reserve on August 31, 2019.

In Week 2 of the 2020 season against the Philadelphia Eagles, Kiser recorded a team high 16 tackles (11 solo) and forced a fumble on running back Miles Sanders which was recovered by teammate Kenny Young during the 37–19 win. He was named the National Football Conference Defensive Player of the Week for his performance in Week 2. He was placed on injured reserve on November 26, 2020. On December 30, 2020, Kiser was activated off of injured reserve.

On August 31, 2021, Kiser was waived by the Rams and re-signed to the practice squad the next day.

=== Denver Broncos ===
On September 22, 2021, Kiser was signed by the Denver Broncos off the Rams practice squad. He was placed on injured reserve on October 23, 2021. He was activated on December 11.

=== Las Vegas Raiders ===
On March 21, 2022, Kiser signed with the Las Vegas Raiders. On August 1, 2022, Kiser was placed on injured reserve.
