= Quin Blanding =

American football player (born 1996)

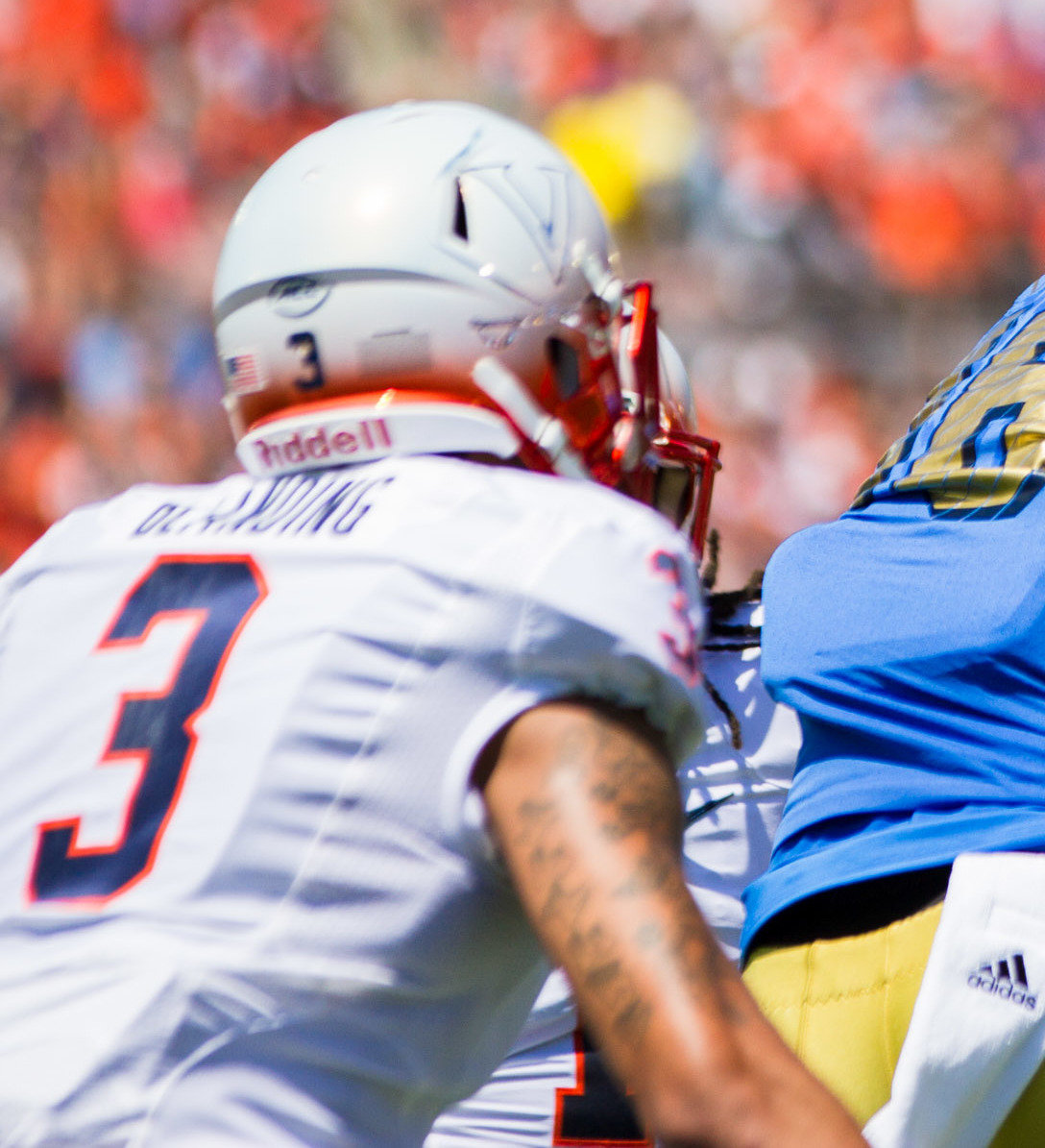

Profile
- Position: Safety

Personal information
- Born: May 1, 1996 (age 30); Virginia Beach, Virginia, U.S.
- Listed height: 6 ft 2 in (1.88 m)
- Listed weight: 210 lb (95 kg)

Career information
- High school: Bayside (Virginia Beach)
- College: Virginia
- NFL draft: 2018: undrafted

Career history
- Washington Redskins (2018)*; Carolina Panthers (2019–2020)*
- * Offseason or practice squad member only

Awards and highlights
- Second-team All-American (2017); ACC Defensive Rookie of the Year (2014); 3× First-team All-ACC (2015, 2016, 2017); Second-team All-ACC (2014)
- Stats at Pro Football Reference

Quin Blanding (born May 1, 1996) is an American former professional football player who was a safety in the National Football League (NFL). He played college football for the Virginia Cavaliers. He signed with the Washington Redskins as an undrafted free agent in 2018.

== Early life ==
Blanding attended Bayside High School in Virginia Beach, Virginia. In high school, he played quarterback, tight end, wide receiver, and safety. He was rated by Rivals.com and Scout.com as a five-star recruit. Rivals had him ranked as the best safety and fifth best player overall. He committed to the University of Virginia to play college football.

== College career ==
Blanding immediately became a starter as a true freshman in 2014. He became the first freshman to start the opening game for Virginia at safety since Tony Blount in 1976. He started all 12 games and recorded 123 tackles, which led all freshman and broke Ahmad Brooks Virginia freshman record. He also added three interceptions and one sack. After the season, he was named the ACC Defensive Rookie of the Year.

Blanding also started all twelve games in 2015 and maintained his rank of number 2 in the ACC with 115 tackles. In 2016, he broke school records, ending the season with a total of 358 tackles, putting him at number 9 in career tackles in UVA history. As the 2017 season continued, Blanding led his team into a secured bowl game, ending the Georgia Tech game with an interception.

== Professional career ==
=== Washington Redskins ===
Blanding was signed by the Washington Redskins as an undrafted free agent on May 2, 2018. He was waived Washington on September 1.

=== Carolina Panthers ===
On December 31, 2018, Blanding signed a reserve/future contract with the Carolina Panthers. He was waived by Carolina during final roster cuts on August 31, 2019, and was re–signed to the practice squad the following day. Blanding signed a reserve/future contract with the Panthers on December 30.

On September 5, 2020, Blanding was waived by the Panthers.
