= 2015 Wake Forest Demon Deacons football team =

American college football season

2015 Wake Forest Demon Deacons football
- Conference: Atlantic Coast Conference
- Atlantic Division
- Record: 3–9 (1–7 ACC)
- Head coach: Dave Clawson (2nd season)
- Offensive coordinator: Warren Ruggiero (2nd season)
- Offensive scheme: Multiple
- Defensive coordinator: Mike Elko (2nd season)
- Base defense: 4–2–5
- Captains: Dylan Intemann; Alex Kinal; Brandon Chubb; Hunter Williams; Ryan Janvion
- Home stadium: BB&T Field

2015 Atlantic Coast Conference football standings
	Conf.			Overall
Team	W		L	W		L
Atlantic Division
No. 2 Clemson x$^	8	–	0	14	–	1
No. 14 Florida State	6	–	2	10	–	3
Louisville	5	–	3	8	–	5
NC State	3	–	5	7	–	6
Syracuse	2	–	6	4	–	8
Wake Forest	1	–	7	3	–	9
Boston College	0	–	8	3	–	9
Coastal Division
No. 15 North Carolina x	8	–	0	11	–	3
Pittsburgh	6	–	2	8	–	5
Miami (FL)	5	–	3	8	–	5
Duke	4	–	4	8	–	5
Virginia Tech	4	–	4	7	–	6
Virginia	3	–	5	4	–	8
Georgia Tech	1	–	7	3	–	9
Championship: Clemson 45, North Carolina 37
^ – College Football Playoff participant; $ – Conference champion; x – Division champion/co-champions; Rankings from AP Poll

The 2015 Wake Forest Demon Deacons football team represented Wake Forest University during the 2015 NCAA Division I FBS football season. The team is coached by Dave Clawson, who is coaching his second season at the school, and plays its home games at BB&T Field. Wake Forest competed in the Atlantic Coast Conference as part of the Atlantic Division, as they have since the league's inception in 1953. They finished the season 3–9, 1–7 in ACC play to finish in sixth place in the Atlantic Division.

== Recruiting ==
College recruiting information (2015)
Name	Hometown	School	Height	Weight	Commit date
Bowman Archibald; TE	Dade City, FL	Pasco HS	6 ft 5 in (1.96 m)	244 lb (111 kg)	Sep 21, 2014
Bowman Archibald; TE	Recruit ratings: Scout: Rivals: 247Sports: ESPN:				
Tabari Hines; WR	Florence, SC	Marlboro County HS	5 ft 10 in (1.78 m)	165 lb (75 kg)	Jun 17, 2014
Tabari Hines; WR	Recruit ratings: Scout: Rivals: 247Sports: ESPN:				
Kendall Hinton; QB	Durham, NC	Southern HS	6 ft 0 in (1.83 m)	180 lb (82 kg)	Jun 11, 2014
Kendall Hinton; QB	Recruit ratings: Scout: Rivals: 247Sports: ESPN:				
Garrett Wilson; LS	Sanford, NC	Southern Lee HS	6 ft 4 in (1.93 m)	210 lb (95 kg)	Jan 13, 2015
Garrett Wilson; LS	Recruit ratings: Scout: Rivals: 247Sports: ESPN:				
Overall recruit ranking: Scout: 64 Rivals: 47 247Sports: 49 ESPN: N/A
Note: In many cases, Scout, Rivals, 247Sports, On3, and ESPN may conflict in their listings of height and weight.; In these cases, the average was taken. ESPN grades are on a 100-point scale.; Sources: "Wake Forest 2015 Football Commitments". Rivals.; "2015 Wake Forest Commits". Scout.; "2015 Player Commitments – Wake Forest". ESPN.; "Scout.com Team Recruiting Rankings". Scout.; "2015 Team Ranking". Rivals.com.

== Schedule ==
Date	Time	Opponent	Site	TV	Result	Attendance
September 3	7:00 p.m.	Elon*	BB&T Field; Winston-Salem, NC	ESPN3	W 41–3	27,126
September 12	12:30 p.m.	at Syracuse	Carrier Dome; Syracuse, NY	ACCN	L 17–30	26,670
September 19	12:00 p.m.	at Army*	Michie Stadium; West Point, NY	CBSSN	W 17–14	29,124
September 26	12:30 p.m.	Indiana*^{†}	BB&T Field; Winston-Salem, NC	ACCN	L 24–31	22,508
October 3	3:30 p.m.	No. 11 Florida State	BB&T Field; Winston-Salem, NC	ESPN	L 16–24	28,588
October 10	3:00 p.m.	at Boston College	Alumni Stadium; Chestnut Hill, MA	ACCRSN	W 3–0	30,094
October 17	7:00 p.m.	at North Carolina	Kenan Memorial Stadium; Chapel Hill, NC (rivalry)	ACCRSN	L 14–50	50,500
October 24	12:00 p.m.	NC State	BB&T Field; Winston-Salem, NC (rivalry)	ACCRSN	L 17–35	30,464
October 30	7:00 p.m.	Louisville	BB&T Field; Winston-Salem, NC	ESPN2	L 19–20	24,922
November 14	3:30 p.m.	at No. 6 Notre Dame*	Notre Dame Stadium; Notre Dame, IN	NBC	L 7–28	80,795
November 21	3:30 p.m.	at No. 1 Clemson	Memorial Stadium; Clemson, SC	ESPN2	L 13–33	81,577
November 28	12:30 p.m.	Duke	BB&T Field; Winston-Salem, NC (rivalry)	ACCN	L 21–27	26,435
*Non-conference game; ^{†}Homecoming; Rankings from AP Poll released prior to the game; All times are in Eastern time

== Personnel ==
=== Coaching staff ===
Position	Name	First year at WFU
Head coach	Dave Clawson	2014
Defensive coordinator / Safeties	Mike Elko	2014
Asst head coach / Receivers	Kevin Higgins	2014
Offensive coordinator / quarterbacks	Warren Ruggiero	2014
Special teams coordinator / tight ends	Adam Scheier	2014
Linebackers	Warren Belin	2013
Defensive Line	Dave Cohen	2014
Running backs	John Hunter	2014
Cornerbacks	Derrick Jackson	2012
Offensive Line	Nick Tabacca	2014
Graduate assistant	Tyler Santucci	2014

=== Roster ===
2015 Wake Forest Demon Deacons
Offense Quarterbacks: 2 Kendall Hinton – Freshman; 10 John Wolford – Sophomore; 11 Chuck Norgle – Freshman; 13 Kyle Kearns – Freshman; 15 Kyle Driscoll – (redshirt) Freshman; Running backs: 24 Tyler Bell – Freshman; 26 Crawford Sloan – (redshirt) Freshman; 49 Trey Ndlovu – Freshman; Fullbacks: 32 Charles Argenzio – Junior; 94 William Flood – Junior; Wide receivers: 6 Tabari Hines – Freshman; 7 Maddox Stamey – (redshirt) Junior; 12 Tyree Harris – (redshirt) Sophomore; 14 Steven Claude – Freshman; 15 Cortez Lewis – (redshirt) Freshman; 25 James Sriraman – Freshman; 80 K.J. Brent – Graduate Student; 81 Scotty Washington – Freshman; 82 P.J. Howard IV – (redshirt) Senior; 83 Jonathan Williams – (redshirt) Junior; 87 Alex Bachman – Freshman; 88 Jared Crump – (redshirt) Junior; 89 Chuck Wade – Freshman; Tight ends: 17 Steve Donatell – (redshirt) Junior; 41 Devin Pike – Sophomore; 46 Nick Luedeke – (redshirt) Freshman; 81 Daniel Vogelsang – (redshirt) Junior; 84 Brendan O'Neil – (redshirt) Sophomore; 85 Cam Serigne – (redshirt) Sophomore; 86 Jack Frudenthal – (redshirt) Junior; Offensive Linemen: 63 Dylan Intemann – (redshirt) Senior; 64 T.J. Haney – Freshman; 65 Josh T. Harris – Junior; 66 Rocco Esposito – (redshirt) Sophomore; 67 Taylor Chambers – (redshirt) Sophomore; 68 Patrick Osterhage – (redshirt) Freshman; 70 Ryan Anderson – (redshirt) Freshman; 71 Nathan Gilliam – Freshman; 72 Nathan Thacker – Freshman; 73 Jake Benzinger – Freshman; 74 Phil Haynes – (redshirt) Freshman; 75 Justin Herron – (redshirt) Freshman; 76 Joel Suggs – (redshirt) Junior; 78 Tyler Hayworth – (redshirt) Junior; 79 Cameron Gardner – (redshirt) Sophomore	Defense Defensive Linemen: 14 Wendell Dunn – (redshirt) Sophomore; 36 Tylor Harris – Senior; 40 Josh Banks – (redshirt) Junior; 42 Julian Jackson – (redshirt) Sophomore; 45 Paris Black – Freshman; 51 Chris Calhoun – Freshman; 53 Duke Ejiofor – (redshirt) Sophomore; 54 Elontae Bateman – Freshman; 57 Ali Lamot – (redshirt) Sophomore; 59 Leo Kone – Freshman; 62 Reid Althoff – (redshirt) Sophomore; 90 Rashawn Shaw – (redshirt) Freshman; 92 Willie Yarbury – (redshirt) Freshman; 93 Zeek Rodney – Sophomore; 95 Shelldon Lewison – (redshirt) Junior; 96 Chris Stewart – (redshirt) Freshman; 99 Khalil Welsh II – Freshman; Linebackers: 5 Zach Wary – (redshirt) Freshman; 8 Marquel Lee – Junior; 28 Teddy Matthews – (redshirt) Junior; 30 Hunter Williams – (redshirt) Senior; 35 Nate Mays – Freshman; 39 Jaboree Williams – Sophomore; 43 Justin Strnad – Freshman; 44 Kalin McNeil – (redshirt) Freshman; 48 Brandon Chubb – (redshirt) Senior; 50 Grant Dawson – (redshirt) Sophomore; 58 Vincent Paolucci – (redshirt) Freshman; Cornerbacks: 3 Devin Gaulden – Graduate Student; 7 Merrill Noel – (redshirt) Junior; 11 Dionte Austin – Freshman; 13 Jalen Latter – Junior; 23 James Ward – Sophomore; 25 Brad Watson – Junior; 29 Deonte Davis – Junior; 32 Jessie Bates – Freshman; Safeties: 2 Cam Glenn – (redshirt) Freshman; 9 Zach Dancel – Graduate Student; 17 A.J. Marshall – Senior; 22 Ryan Janvion – (redshirt) Freshman; 24 Josh Okonye – (redshirt) Sophomore; 26 Thomas Brown – Freshman	Special teams Placekickers: 18 Mike Weaver – (redshirt) Sophomore; 61 Sam Beckerman – (redshirt) Junior; 97 Ben Brown – Freshman; 98 Adam Centers – Sophomore; Punters: 18 Mike Weaver – (redshirt) Sophomore; 38 Alexander Kinal – (redshirt) Senior; Long Snappers: 15 Garrett Wilson – Freshman; 91 Chase Wilson – (redshirt) Sophomore; Kick returners: 18 John Armstrong – Freshman; 22 Matt Colborn – (redshirt) Senior; Punt Returners: 6 Tabari Hines – Freshman; 87 Alex Bachman – Freshman

== Game summaries ==
=== Elon ===
11th meeting. 9–0–1 all time. Last meeting 2009, 35–7 Demon Deacons in Winston–Salem.

Week One: Elon Phoenix at Wake Forest Demon Deacons – Game summary

Quarter	1	2	3	4	Total
Phoenix	0	0	3	0	3
Demon Deacons	3	21	14	3	41

at BB&T Field, Winston–Salem, NC

- Date: September 3
- Game time: 7:00 p.m. EST
- Game weather: 84° F • N 1 • Clear
- Game attendance: 27,126
- Referee: David Epperly
- TV announcers (ESPN3): Play-by-Play: Roy Philpott • Color Analyst: Stan Lewter
- Final Stats

Game information

First quarter

- 03:10 WFU – Mike Weaver 28-yard field goal, Demon Deacons 3–0. Drive: 8 plays, 59 yards, TOP 4:26

Second quarter

- 11:19 WFU – Cam Serigne 10-yard pass from John Wolford (Mike Weaver kick), Demon Deacons 10–0. Drive: 5 plays, 60 yards, TOP 2:22
- 04:43 WFU – Matt Colburn 2-yard run (Mike Weaver kick), Demon Deacons 17–0. Drive: 11 plays, 90 yards, TOP 4:49
- 02:57 WFU – John Wolford 70-yard run (Mike Weaver kick), Demon Deacons 24–0. Drive: 1 play, 70 yards, TOP 0:18

Third quarter

- 09:14 ELON – John Gallagher 45-yard field goal, Demon Deacons 24–3. Drive: 6 plays, 19 yards, TOP 2:15
- 07:17 WFU – Cortez Lewis 30-yard pass from John Wolford (Mike Weaver kick), Demon Deacons 31–3. Drive: 6 plays, 75 yards, TOP 1:57
- 03:31 WFU – Chuck Wade 27-yard pass from John Wolford (Mike Weaver kick), Demon Deacons 38–3. Drive: 5 plays, 55 yards, TOP 2:38

Fourth quarter

- 10:47 WFU – Mike Weaver 32-yard field goal, Demon Deacons 41–3. Drive: 12 plays, 69 yards, TOP 4:48

Leading Passers

- ELON–Connor Christianson, 8/14, 50 yards
- WF–John Wolford, 20/27, 327 yards

Leading Rushers

- ELON–Connor Christianson, 4 carries, 22 yards
- WF–John Wolford, 7 carries, 63 yards, 1 touchdown

Leading Receivers

- ELON–Tre Lennon, 4 receptions, 30 yards
- WF–Chuck Wade, 4 receptions, 70 yards, 1 touchdown

Leading Tacklers

- ELON–Chris Blair, 13 tackles
- WF–Hunter Williams, 5 tackles

=== @ Syracuse ===
5th meeting. 1–3 all time. Last meeting 2014, 30–7 Orange in Winston–Salem.

Week Two: Wake Forest Demon Deacons at Syracuse Orange – Game summary

Quarter	1	2	3	4	Total
Demon Deacons	7	10	0	0	17
Orange	3	10	7	10	30

at Carrier Dome, Syracuse, NY

- Date: September 12
- Game time: 12:30 p.m. EST
- Game weather: Inside
- Game attendance: 26,670
- Referee: Duane Heydt
- TV announcers (ACCN): Play-By-Play: Tim Brant • Color Analyst: Dave Archer • Sideline: Roddy Jones
- Final Stats

Game information

First quarter

- 04:17 SU – Cole Murphy 35-yard field goal, Orange 3–0. Drive: 6 plays, 19 yards, TOP 2:28
- 02:31 WFU – KJ Brent 40-yard pass from John Wolford (Mike Weaver kick), Demon Deacons 7–3. Drive: 4 plays, 75 yards, TOP 1:46

Second quarter

- 14:51 SU – Cole Murphy 39-yard field goal, Demon Deacons 7–6. Drive: 7 plays, 48 yards, TOP 2:40
- 14:07 SU – Donnie Simmons 41-yard interception return (Cole Murphy kick), Orange 13–7. Drive: 2 plays, 13 yards, TOP 0:44
- 09:20 WFU – John Wolford 6-yard run (Mike Weaver kick), Demon Deacons 14–13. Drive: 9 plays, 75 yards, TOP 4:47
- 00:08 WFU – Mike Weaver 27-yard field goal, Demon Deacons 17–13. Drive: 11 plays, 45 yards, TOP 2:42

Third quarter

- 02:01 SU – Brisley Estime 89-yard pass from Eric Dungey (Cole Murphy kick), Orange 20–17. Drive: 1 play, 89 yards, TOP 0:14

Fourth quarter

- 11:17 SU – Steve Ishmael 53-yard pass from Eric Dungey (Cole Murphy kick), Orange 27–17. Drive: 7 plays, 85 yards, TOP 3:35
- 01:47 SU – Cole Murphy 20-yard field goal, Orange 30–17. Drive: 7 plays, 34 yards, TOP 2:16

Leading Passers

- WF–John Wolford, 30/45, 373 yards, 1 touchdown, 3 interceptions
- SYR–Eric Dungey, 8/13, 221 yards, 2 touchdowns

Leading Rushers

- WF–Tyler Bell, 12 carries, 39 yards
- SYR–George Morris II, 6 carries, 46 yards

Leading Receivers

- WF–KJ Brent, 96 yards, 7 receptions, 1 touchdown
- SYR–Brisly Estime, 98 yards, 2 receptions, 1 touchdown

Leading Tacklers

- WF–Brandon Chubb, 9 tackles
- SYR–Parris Bennett, 8 tackles

=== @ Army ===
15th meeting. 10–4 all time. Last meeting 2014, 24–21 Demon Deacons in Winston–Salem.

Week Three: Wake Forest Demon Deacons at Army West Point Black Knights – Game summary

Quarter	1	2	3	4	Total
Demon Deacons	0	0	7	10	17
Black Knights	0	7	0	7	14

at Mitchie Stadium, West Point, NY

- Date: September 19
- Game time: 12:00 p.m. EST
- Game weather: 79° F • S 8 • Mostly Sunny
- Game attendance: 29,124
- Referee: Tom McCreesh
- TV announcers (CBSSN): Play-by-Play: Ben Holden • Color Analyst: Jay Feely • Sideline: John Schriffen
- Final Stats

Game information

First quarter

- No Scoring

Second quarter

- 10:07 ARMY – Ahmad Bradshaw 4-yard run (Daniel Grochowski kick), Black Knights 7–0. Drive: 8 plays, 55 yards, TOP 4:03

Third quarter

- 4:52 WFU – Kendall Hinton 15-yard run (Mike Weaver kick), Tied 7–7. Drive: 5 plays, 79 yards, TOP 1:33

Fourth quarter

- 13:41 WFU – Kendall Hinton 7-yard run (Mike Weaver kick), Demon Deacons 14–7. Drive: 9 plays, 71 yards, TOP 3:32
- 7:25 ARMY – Christian Drake 9-yard run (Daniel Grochowski kick), Tied 14–14. Drive: 1 play, 9 yards, TOP 0:06
- 0:00 WFU – Mike Weaver 47-yard field goal, Demon Deacons 17–14. Drive: 12 plays, 64 yards, TOP 2:35

Leading Passers

- WF–Kendall Hinton, 15/27, 159 yards, 2 interceptions
- ARMY–Ahmad Brenshaw, 2/3, 54 yards

Leading Rushers

- WF–Kendall Hinton, 17 carries, 101 yards, 2 touchdowns
- ARMY–Ahmad Brenshaw, 22 carries, 61 yards

Leading Receivers

- WF–KJ Brent, 4 receptions, 72 yards
- ARMY–DeAndre Bell, 1 reception, 31 yards

Leading Tacklers

- WF–Brandon Chubb, 6 tackles
- ARMY–Andrew King, 7 tackles

=== Indiana ===
1st meeting.

Week Four: Indiana Hoosiers at Wake Forest Demon Deacons – Game summary

Quarter	1	2	3	4	Total
Hoosiers	7	10	7	7	31
Demon Deacons	0	10	0	14	24

at BB&T Field, Winston–Salem, NC

- Date: September 26
- Game time: 12:30 p.m. EST
- Game weather: 62° F • NE 14 • Light Rain
- Game attendance: 22,508
- Referee: Gary Patterson
- TV announcers (ACCN): Play-By-Play: Tim Brant • Color Analyst: Dave Archer • Sideline: Roddy Jones
- Final Stats

Game information

First quarter

- 6:45 IU – Jr. Simmie Cobbs 6-yard pass from Nate Sudfield (Griffin Oakes kick), Hoosiers 7–0. Drive: 10 plays, 56 yards, TOP 2:51

Second quarter

- 14:34 WFU – Kendall Hinton 15-yard run (Mike Weaver kick), Tied 7–7. Drive: 6 plays, 76 yards, TOP 2:01
- 11:05 IU – Ricky Jones 28-yard pass from Nate Sudfield (Griffin Oakes kick), Hoosiers 14–7. Drive: 10 plays, 92 yards, TOP 3:29
- 3:47 WFU – Mike Weaver 35-yard field goal, Hoosiers 14–10. Drive: 7 plays, 51 yards, TOP 2:21
- 0:00 IU – Griffin Oakes 30-yard field goal, Hoosiers 17–10. Drive: 12 plays, 67 yards, TOP 2:20

Third quarter

- 8:27 IU – Jordan Howard 2-yard run (Griffin Oakes kick), Hoosiers 24–10. Drive: 11 plays, 80 yards, TOP 4:22

Fourth quarter

- 10:22 IU – Tony Fields 20-yard interception return (Griffin Oakes kick), Hoosiers 31–10. Drive: 3 plays, 0 yards, TOP 0:54
- 6:25 WFU – Kendall Hinton 14-yard run (Mike Weaver kick), Hoosiers 31–17. Drive: 12 plays, 75 yards, TOP 3:57
- 2:33 WFU – Tabari Hines 29-yard pass from Kendall Hinton (Mike Weaver kick), Hoosiers 31–24. Drive: 7 plays, 90 yards, TOP 0:59

Leading Passers

- IND–Nate Sudfield, 19/34, 205 yards, 2 touchdowns
- WF–Kendall Hinton, 19/46, 245 yards, 1 touchdown, 1 interception

Leading Rushers

- IND–Howard Jordan, 33 carries, 168 yards, 1 touchdown
- WF–Kendall Hinton, 22 carries, 57 yards, 2 touchdowns

Leading Receivers

- IND–Simmie Cobbs Jr., 7 receptions, 75 yards, 1 tocuhdown
- WF–Cam Serigne, 5 receptions, 72 yards

Leading Tacklers

- IND–Tegray Scales, 9 tackles, 2 sacks
- WF–Brad Watson, 14 tackles

=== Florida State ===
34th meeting. 6–26–1 all time. Last meeting 2014, 43–3 Seminoles in Tallahassee.

Week Five: Florida State Seminoles at Wake Forest Demon Deacons – Game summary

Quarter	1	2	3	4	Total
#11 Seminoles	7	7	10	0	24
Demon Deacons	3	7	0	6	16

at BB&T Field, Winston–Salem, NC

- Date: October 3
- Game time: 3:30 p.m. EST
- Game weather: 56° F • NE 17 • Rain
- Game attendance: 28,588
- Referee: Penn Wagers
- TV announcers (ESPN): Play-by-Play: Mark Neely • Color Analyst: David Diaz-Infante • Sideline: Dawn Davenport
- Final Stats

Game information

First quarter

- 8:17 FSU – Dalvin Cook 94-yard run (Roberto Aguayo kick), Seminoles 7–0. Drive: 1 play, 94 yards, TOP 0:14
- 2:57 WFU – Mike Weaver 28-yard field goal, Seminoles 7–3. Drive: 12 plays, 65 yards, TOP 5:20

Second quarter

- 11:08 FSU – Johnathan Vickers 9-yard run (Roberto Aguayo kick), Seminoles 14–3. Drive: 13 plays, 76 yards, TOP 6:49
- 4:12 WFU – Cam Serigne 7-yard pass from Kendall Hinton (Mike Weaver kick), Seminoles 14–10. Drive: 13 plays, 73 yards, TOP 6:56

Third quarter

- 12:23 FSU – Kermit Whitfield 5-yard pass from Everett Golson (Roberto Aguayo kick), Seminoles 21–10. Drive: 7 plays, 43 yards, TOP 2:37
- 7:33 FSU – Roberto Aguayo 25-yard field goal, Seminoles 24–10. Drive: 7 plays, 69 yards, TOP 3:45

Fourth quarter

- 11:26 WFU – Mike Weaver 34-yard field goal, Seminoles 24–13. Drive: 14 plays, 74 yards, TOP 4:42
- 3:34 WFU – Mike Weaver 29-yard field goal, Seminoles 24–16. Drive: 14 plays, 59 yards, TOP 6:01

Leading Passers

- FSU–Everett Golson, 20/31, 202 yards, 1 touchdown
- WF–Kendall Hinton, 27/42, 215 yards, 1 touchdown, 1 interception

Leading Rushers

- FSU–Dalvin Cook, 2 carries, 94 yards, 1 touchdown
- WF–Matt Colburn, 11 carries, 51 yards

Leading Receivers

- FSU–Travis Rudolph, 6 receptions, 69 yards
- WF–Cam Serigne, 10 receptions, 83 yards, 1 touchdown

Leading Tacklers

- FSU–Trey Marshall, 7 tackles
- WF–Zach Dancel, 4 tackles

=== @ Boston College ===
23rd meeting. 8–12–2 all time. Last meeting 2014, 23–17 Eagles in Winston–Salem.

Week Six: Wake Forest Demon Deacons at Boston College Eagles – Game summary

Quarter	1	2	3	4	Total
Demon Deacons	0	0	3	0	3
Eagles	0	0	0	0	0

at Alumni Stadium, Chestnut Hill, MA

- Date: October 10
- Game time: 3:00 p.m. EST
- Game weather: 58° F • NNW 7 • Sunny
- Game attendance: 30,094
- Referee: Riley Johnson
- TV announcers (ACCRSN): Play-by-Play: Wes Durham • Color Analyst: James Bates • Sideline: Jenn Hildreth
- Final Stats

Game information

First quarter

- No Scoring

Second quarter

- No Scoring

Third quarter

- 10:18 WFU – Mike Weaver 25-yard field goal, Demon Deacons 3–0. Drive: 4 plays, −2 yards, TOP 1:38

Fourth quarter

- No Scoring

Leading Passers

- WF–John Wolford, 11/25, 109 yards, 1 interception
- BC–Jeff Smith, 4/12, 56 yards, 1 interception

Leading Rushers

- WF–Matt Colburn, 12 carries, 37 yards
- BC–Marcus Outlaw, 15 carries, 64 yards

Leading Receivers

- WF–Cortez Lewis, 5 receptions, 65 yards
- BC–Charlie Callinan, 2 receptions, 42 yards

Leading Tacklers

- WF–Brandon Chubb, 9 tackles
- BC–Medhi Abdesmad, 8 tackles

=== @ North Carolina ===
106th meeting. 35–68–2 all time. Last meeting 2012, 28–27 Demon Deacons in Winston–Salem.

Week Seven: Wake Forest Demon Deaconds at North Carolina Tar Heels – Game summary

Quarter	1	2	3	4	Total
Demon Deacons	7	7	0	0	14
Tar Heels	0	29	7	14	50

at Kenan Memorial Stadium, Chapel Hill, NC

- Date: October 17
- Game time: 7:00 p.m. EST
- Game weather: 56° F • NNW 7 • Clear and cool
- Game attendance: 50,500
- Referee: Gary Patterson
- TV announcers (ACCRSN): Play-by-Play: Stan Cotten • Color Analyst: Tommy Elrod • Sideline: Dave Goren
- Final Stats

Game information

First quarter

- 7:07 WFU – Cam Serigne 1-yard pass from John Wolford (Mike Weaver kick), Demon Deacons 7–0. Drive: 5 plays, 30 yards, TOP 2:31

Second quarter

- 14:52 UNC – Mack Hollins 57-yard pass from Marquise Williams (Nick Weiler kick), Tied 7–7. Drive: 4 plays, 75 yards, TOP 0:52
- 13:06 UNC – Marquise Williams 13-yard run (Nick Weiler kick), Tar Heels 14–7. Drive: 5 plays, 34 yards, TOP 1:36
- 11:18 UNC – Elijah Hood 36-yard run (Joey Mangili pass to Brandon Fritts for two-point conv.), Tar Heels 22–7. Drive: 2 plays, 65 yards, TOP 0:21
- 6:18 WFU – Tabari Hines 5-yard pass from John Wolford (Mike Weaver kick), Tar Heels 22–14. Drive: 12 plays, 75 yards, TOP 5:00
- 4:29 UNC – T.J. Logan 1-yard run (Nick Weiler kick), Tar Heel 29–14. Drive: 5 plays, 76 yards, TOP 1:47

Third quarter

- 0:04 UNC – Mack Hollins 4-yard pass from Marquise Williams (Nick Weiler kick), Tar Heels 36–14. Drive: 7 plays, 77 yards, TOP 2:37

Fourth quarter

- 12:34 UNC – Mack Hollins 42-yard pass from Marquise Williams (Nick Weiler kick), Tar Heels 43–14. Drive: 2 plays, 75 yards, TOP 0:29
- 11:11 UNC – Mitch Trubisky 10-yard run (Nick Weiler kick), Tar Heels 50–14. Drive: 3 plays, 12 yards, TOP 0:36

Leading Passers

- WF–John Wolford, 16/22, 176 yards, 2 touchdowns
- UNC–Marquise Williams, 14/20, 282 yards, 3 touchdowns, 2 interceptions

Leading Rushers

- WF–Tyler Bell, 13 carries, 48 yards
- UNC–Elijah Hood, 8 carries, 101 yards, 1 touchdown

Leading Receivers

- WF–Cam Serigne, 6 receptions, 65 yards, 1 touchdown
- UNC–Mack Hollins, 3 receptions, 103 yards, 3 touchdowns

Leading Tacklers

- WF–Brandon Chubb, 10 tackles
- UNC–J. Gnonkonde, 9 tackles, 2 sacks for 26 yards

=== NC State ===
109th meeting. 38–64–6 all time. Last meeting 2014, 42–13 Wolfpack in Raleigh.

Week Eight: North Carolina State Wolfpack at Wake Forest Demon Deacons – Game summary

Quarter	1	2	3	4	Total
Wolfpack	28	0	0	7	35
Demon Deacons	0	7	3	7	17

at BB&T Field, Winston–Salem, NC

- Date: October 24
- Game time: 12:00 p.m. EST
- Game weather: 63° F • ESE 5 • Partly Cloudy
- Game attendance: 30,464
- Referee: Jerry Magallanes
- TV announcers (ACCRSN): Play-by-Play: Stan Cotten • Color Analyst: Tommy Elrod • Sidelines: Dave Goren
- Final Stats

Game information

First quarter

- 14:07 NCST – Maurice Trowell 59-yard pass from Jacoby Brissett (Kyle Bambard kick), Wolfpack 7–0. Drive: 3 plays, 75 yards, TOP 0:53
- 12:15 NCST – Matthew Dayes 85-yard run (Kyle Bambard kick), Wolfpack 14–0. Drive: 1 play, 85 yards, TOP 0:13
- 3:17 NCST – Nyheim Hines 58-yard pass from Jacoby Brissett (Kyle Bambard kick), Wolfpack 21–0. Drive: 1 play, 58 yards, TOP 0:11
- 0:45 NCST – Matthew Dayes 57-yard run (Kyle Bambard kick), Wolfpack 28–0. Drive: 4 plays, 67 yards, TOP 1:28

Second quarter

- 3:24 WFU – Kendall Hinton 69-yard run (Mike Weaver kick), Wolfpack 28–7. Drive: 3 plays, 77 yards, TOP 1:33

Third quarter

- 4:38 WFU – Mike Weaver 38-yard field goal, Wolfpack 28–14. Drive: 7 plays, 48 yards, TOP 3:57

Fourth quarter

- 4:30 NCST – Bra'Lon Cherry 52-yard punt return (Kyle Bambard kick), Wolfpack 35–14. Drive: 3 plays, −3 yards, TOP 1:13
- 0:44 WFU – Kendall Hinton 1-yard run (Mike Weaver kick), Wolfpack 35–17. Drive: 8 plays, 75 yards, TOP 3:46

Leading Passers

- NCST–Jacoby Brissett, 20/34, 227 yards, 2 touchdowns
- WF–Kendall Hinton, 12/22, 107 yards

Leading Rushers

- NCST–Matthew Dayes, 16 carries, 205 yards, 2 touchdowns
- WF–Kendall Hinton, 13 carries, 75 yards, 2 touchdowns

Leading Receivers

- NCST–Jaylen Samuels, 7 receptions, 26 yards
- WF–Tabari Hines, 5 receptions, 42 yards

Leading Tacklers

- NCST–B.J. Hill, 6 tackles
- WF–Brad Watson, 7 tackles

=== Louisville ===
3rd meeting. 0–2 all time. Last meeting 2014, 20–10 Cardinals in Louisville.

Week Nine: Louisville Cardinals at Wake Forest Demon Deacons – Game summary

Quarter	1	2	3	4	Total
Cardinals	0	17	3	0	20
Demon Deacons	10	9	0	0	19

at BB&T Field, Winston–Salem, NC

- Date: October 30
- Game time: 7:00 p.m. EST
- Game weather: 55° F • NNE 3 • Clear
- Game attendance: 24,922
- Referee: David Epperly
- TV announcers (ESPN2): Play-by-Play: Dave Flemming • Color Analyst: Mack Brown • Sidelines: Allison Williams
- Final Stats

Game information

First quarter

- 6:04 WFU – Mike Weaver 36-yard field goal, Demon Deacons 3–0. Drive: 4 plays, −10 yards, TOP 1:54
- 3:36 WFU – Cortez Lewis 78-yard pass from Kendall Hinton (Mike Weaver kick), Demon Deacons 10–0. Drive: 2 plays, 82 yards, TOP 0:44

Second quarter

- 12:37 LOU – John Wallace 37-yard field goal, Demon Deacons 10–3. Drive: 14 plays, 62 yards, TOP 5:59
- 8:17 LOU – Jamari Staples 14-yard pass from Lamar Jackson (John Wallace kick), Tied 10–10. Drive: 7 plays, 50 yards, TOP 2:47
- 2:15 WFU – Duke Ejiofor safety, Demon Deacons 12–10. Drive: 2 plays, −8 yards, TOP 0:31
- 0:55 WFU – Tabari Hines 58-yard pass from John Wolford (Mike Weaver kick), Demon Deacons 19–10. Drive: 3 plays, 66 yards, TOP 1:20
- 0:22 LOU – Jamari Staples 22-yard pass from Lamar Jackson (John Wallace kick), Demon Deacons 19–17. Drive: 4 plays, 78 yards, TOP 0:33

Third quarter

- 1:25 LOU – John Wallace 39-yard field goal, Cardinals 20–19. Drive: 4 plays, 0 yards, TOP 1:52

Fourth quarter

- No Scoring

Leading Passers

- LOU–Lamar Jackson, 19/26, 207 yards, 2 touchdowns
- WF–John Wolford, 6/18, 131 yards, 1 touchdown, 3 interceptions

Leading Rushers

- LOU–Jeremy Smith, 12 carries, 58 yards
- WF–Matt Colburn, 11 carries, 24 yards

Leading Receivers

- LOU–Jamari Staples, 10 receptions, 133 yards, 2 touchdowns
- WF–Tabari Hines, 3 receptions, 82 yards, 1 touchdown

Leading Tacklers

- LOU–Devonte Fields, 8 tackles
- WF–Brandon Chubb, 12 tackles

=== @ Notre Dame ===
3rd meeting. 0–2 all time. Last meeting 2012, 38–0 Fighting Irish in South Bend.

Week Ten: Wake Forest Demon Deacons at Notre Dame Fighting Irish – Game summary

Quarter	1	2	3	4	Total
Demon Deacons	0	0	7	0	7
#4 Fighting Irish	14	7	0	7	28

at Notre Dame Stadium, South Bend, IN

- Date: November 14
- Game time: 3:30 p.m. EST
- Game weather: 52° F • S 10 • Clear skies
- Game attendance: 80,795
- Referee: Jeff Flanagan
- TV announcers (NBC): Play-by-Play: Dan Hicks • Color Analyst: Doug Flutie • Sideline: Kathryn Tappen
- Final Stats

Game information

First quarter

- 3:41 ND – DeShone Kizer 12-yard run (Justin Yoon kick), Fighting Irish 7–0. Drive: 10 plays, 67 yards, TOP 3:46
- 2:46 ND – Andrew Trumbetti 28 yard interception return (Justin Yoon kick), Fighting Irish 14–0. Drive: 3 plays, 10 yards, TOP 0:55

Second quarter

- 9:59 ND – Josh Adams 98 yard run (Justin Yoon kick), Fighting Irish 21–0. Drive: 2 plays, 99 yards, TOP 0:52

Third quarter

- 2:40 WFU – John Wolford 1 yard run (Mike Weaver kick), Fighting Irish 21–7. Drive: 11 plays, 55 yards, TOP 6:16

Fourth quarter

- 10:58 ND – DeShone Kizer 5 yard run (Justin Yoon kick), Fighting Irish 28–7. Drive: 6 plays, 68 yards, TOP 2:18

Leading Passers

- WF–John Wolford, 19/30, 219 yards, 1 interception
- ND–DeShone Kizer, 13/19, 111 yards

Leading Rushers

- WF–Tyler Bell, 23 carries, 90 yards
- ND–Josh Adams, 17 carries, 141 yards, 1 touchdown

Leading Receivers

- WF–K.J. Brent, 5 receptions, 82 yards
- ND–Will Fuller, 3 receptions, 37 yards

Leading Tacklers

- WF–Marquel Lee, 8 tackles
- ND–Jaylon Smith, 14 tackles

=== @ Clemson ===
81st meeting. 17–62–1 all time. Last meeting 2014, 34–20 Tigers in Winston–Salem.

Week Ten: Wake Forest Demon Deacons at Clemson Tigers – Game summary

Quarter	1	2	3	4	Total
Demon Deacons	0	7	0	6	13
#1 Tigers	20	10	3	0	33

at Memorial Stadium, Clemson, SC

- Date: November 21
- Game time: 3:30 p.m. EST
- Game weather: 58° F • Light wind • Mostly Cloudy
- Game attendance: 81,577
- Referee: Duane Heydt
- TV announcers (ESPN2): Play by Play: Dave Lamont • Color Analyst: Ray Bentley • Sideline: Dawn Davenport
- Final Stats

Game information

First quarter

- 10:10 CLEM – Deshaun Watson 3 yard run (Greg Huegel kick), Tigers 7–0. Drive: 7 plays, 63 yards, TOP 2:33
- 5:36 CLEM – Charone Peake 44 yard pass from Deshaun Watson (Greg Huegel kick), Tigers 14–0. Drive: 2 plays, 47 yards, TOP 0:32
- 0:44 CLEM – Deon Cain 11 yard pass from Deshaun Watson (Greg Huegel PAT blocked), Tigers 20–0. Drive: 5 plays, 76 yards, TOP 2:10

Second quarter

- 5:26 WFU – Kendall Hinton 8 yard run (Mike Weaver kick), Tigers 20–7. Drive: 2 plays, 11 yards, TOP 0:46
- 2:12 CLEM – Germone Hopper 47 yard pass from Deshaun Watson (Ammon Lakip kick), Tigers 27–7. Drive: 7 plays, 74 yards, TOP 3:09
- 0:00 CLEM – Greg Huegel 40 yard field goal, Tigers 30–7. Drive: 6 plays, 51 yards, TOP 0:31

Third quarter

- 0:46 CLEM – Greg Huegel 36 yard field goal, Tigers 33–7. Drive: 11 plays, 66 yards, TOP 5:22

Fourth quarter

- 5:28 WFU – Cortez Lewis 30 yard pass from Kendall Hinton (Mike Weaver PAT failed), Tigers 33–13. Drive: 6 plays, 61 yards, TOP 3:08

Leading Passers

- WF–John Wolford, 12/20, 91 yards
- CLEM–Deshaun Watson, 24/35, 343 yards, 3 touchdowns, 2 interceptions

Leading Rushers

- WF–Kendall Hinton, 7 carries, 51 yards, 1 touchdown
- CLEM–Kelly Bryant, 8 carries, 58 yards

Leading Receivers

- WF–K.J. Brent, 4 receptions, 60 yards
- CLEM–Artavis Scott, 6 receptions, 53 yards

Leading Tacklers

- WF–Brandon Chubb, 11 tackles
- CLEM–Dorian O'Daniel, 7 tackles

=== Duke ===
96th meeting. 37–56–2 all time. Last meeting 2014, 41–21 Blue Devils in Durham.

Week Ten: Duke Blue Devils at Wake Forest Demon Deacons – Game summary

Quarter	1	2	3	4	Total
Blue Devils	7	10	7	3	27
Demon Deacons	7	0	0	14	21

at BB&T Field, Winston–Salem, NC

- Date: November 28
- Game time: 12:30 p.m. EST
- Game weather: 68° F • WSW 8 • Overcast
- Game attendance: 26,435
- Referee: Gary Patterson
- TV announcers (ACCN): Play-by-Play: Tim Brant • Color Analyst: Dave Archer • Sideline: Roddy Jones
- Final Stats

Game information

First quarter

- 3:24 DUKE – Max McCaffrey 18 yard pass from Thomas Sirk (Ross Martin kick), Blue Devils 7–0. Drive: 7 plays, 36 yards, TOP 2:45
- 0:06 WFU – Tyler Bell 1 yard run (Mike Weaver kick), Tied 7–7. Drive: 7 plays, 75 yards, TOP 3:18

Second quarter

- 9:48 DUKE – Thomas Sirk 3 yard run (Ross Martin kick), Blue Devils 14–7. Drive: 13 plays, 75 yards, TOP 5:18
- 0:00 DUKE – Ross Martin 51 yard field goal, Blue Devils 17–7. Drive: 12 plays, 51 yards, TOP 5:13

Third quarter

- 10:39 DUKE – Max McCaffery 28 yard pass from Thomas Sirk (Ross Martin kick), Blue Devils 24–7. Drive: 6 plays, 80 yards, TOP 2:13

Fourth quarter

- 11:20 WFU – Cam Serigne 10 yard pass from John Wolford (Mike Weaver kick), Blue Devils 24–14. Drive: 10 plays, 91 yards, TOP 3:22
- 2:33 DUKE – Ross Martin 35 yard field goal, Blue Devils 27–14. Drive: 10 plays, 57 yards, TOP 4:39
- 1:46 WFU – Cortez Lewis 22 yard pass from John Wolford (Mike Weaver kick), Blue Devils 27–21. Drive: 5 plays, 75 yards, TOP 0:47

Leading Passers

- DUKE–Thomas Sirk, 26/39, 275 yards, 2 touchdowns
- WF–John Wolford, 23/35, 338 yards, 2 touchdowns, 2 interceptions

Leading Rushers

- DUKE–Thomas Sirk, 16 carries, 57 yards, 1 touchdown
- WF–Tyler Bell, 16 carries, 94 yards, 1 touchdown

Leading Receivers

- DUKE–T.J. Rahming, 7 receptions, 63 yards
- WF–Cam Serigne, 5 receptions, 135 yards, 1 touchdown

Leading Tacklers

- DUKE–Dwayne Norman, 8 tackles
- WF–Ryan Janvion, 12 tackles

== Statistics ==
=== Scores by quarter ===
	1	2	3	4	Total
Wake Forest	37	78	34	60	209
Opponents	86	107	47	55	295

=== Offense ===
==== Rushing ====
Name	GP	Att	Yards	Avg	TD	Long	Avg/G
Tyler Bell	12	129	451	3.5	1	33	37.6
Kendall Hinton	10	93	390	4.2	7	69	39.0
Matt Colburn	10	66	239	3.6	1	21	23.9
Isaiah Robinson	12	6	120	3.1	0	22	10.0
John Wolford	11	73	67	0.9	3	70	6.1
Dezmond Wortham	11	9	21	2.3	0	6	1.9
Charles Argenzio	9	1	6	6.0	0	6	0.7
Chuck Wade	12	1	−1	−1.0	0	0	0.1
Tabari Hines	12	3	−13	−4.3	0	0	−1.1
TEAM	4	3	−18	−6.0	0	0	−4.5
Demon Deacons Total	12	417	1,262	3.0	12	70	105.2
Opponents	12	462	1,935	4.2	16	98	161.2

==== Passing ====
Name	GP	Cmp–Att	Pct	Yds	TD	INT	Lng	Avg/G	RAT
John Wolford	11	142–243	60.9	1,791	9	11	58	162.8	128.08
Kendall Hinton	10	93–179	52.0	929	4	5	78	92.9	97.03
Cam Serigne	12	0–2	0.0	0	0	0	0	0.0	−100.00
Tabari Hines	12	0–1	0.0	0	0	0	0	0.0	−200.00
TEAM	4	0–1	0.0	0	0	0	0	0.0	000.00
KJ Brent	12	1–1	0.0	19	0	0	19	1.6	259.06
Demon Deacons Total	12	236–417	56.6	2,739	13	18	78	228.2	113.42
Opponents	12	199–322	61.8	2,430	17	6	89	202.5	138.89

==== Receiving ====
Name	GP	Rec	Yds	Avg	TD	Long	Avg/G
Cortez Lewis	12	47	611	13.0	4	78	50.9
Cam Seringe	12	46	562	12.2	4	49	46.8
KJ Brent	12	42	583	13.9	1	52	48.6
Chuck Wade	12	33	348	10.5	1	33	29.0
Tabari Hines	12	32	366	11.4	3	58	30.5
Tyler Bell	12	18	127	7.1	0	25	10.6
Isaiah Robinson	12	6	57	9.5	0	15	4.8
Steve Donatell	12	3	31	10.3	1	14	2.6
P.J. Howard IV	8	3	11	3.7	0	6	1.4
Tyree Harris	3	2	15	7.5	0	8	5.0
Dezmond Wortham	11	1	13	13.0	0	13	1.2
Alex Bachman	11	1	8	8.0	0	8	0.7
Maddox Stamey	1	1	6	6.0	0	6	6.0
Charles Argenzino	9	1	1	1.0	0	1	0.1
Demon Deacons Total	12	236	2,739	11.6	13	78	228.2
Opponents	12	199	2,430	12.2	17	89	202.5

==== Scoring ====
Name	TD	FG	PAT	2PT PAT	SAFETY	TOT PTS
Mike Weaver		11–18	24–25			57
Kendall Hinton	7					42
Cortez Lewis	4					24
Cam Seringe	4					24
Tabari Hines	3					18
John Wolford	3					18
Tyler Bell	1					6
Chuck Wade	1					6
KJ Brent	1					6
Matt Colburn	1					6
Duke Ejiofor					1	2
