= 2015 Pittsburgh Panthers football team =

American college football season

2015 Pittsburgh Panthers football

Military Bowl, L 28–44 vs. Navy
- Conference: Atlantic Coast Conference
- Coastal Division
- Record: 8–5 (6–2 ACC)
- Head coach: Pat Narduzzi (1st season)
- Offensive coordinator: Jim Chaney (1st season)
- Offensive scheme: Pro-style
- Defensive coordinator: Josh Conklin (1st season)
- Base defense: 4–3
- Home stadium: Heinz Field

2015 Atlantic Coast Conference football standings
| | Conf. | | | Overall |
| Team | W | | L | W | | L |
|---|---|---|---|---|---|---|
Atlantic Division
| No. 2 Clemson x$^ | 8 | – | 0 | 14 | – | 1 |
| No. 14 Florida State | 6 | – | 2 | 10 | – | 3 |
| Louisville | 5 | – | 3 | 8 | – | 5 |
| NC State | 3 | – | 5 | 7 | – | 6 |
| Syracuse | 2 | – | 6 | 4 | – | 8 |
| Wake Forest | 1 | – | 7 | 3 | – | 9 |
| Boston College | 0 | – | 8 | 3 | – | 9 |
Coastal Division
| No. 15 North Carolina x | 8 | – | 0 | 11 | – | 3 |
| Pittsburgh | 6 | – | 2 | 8 | – | 5 |
| Miami (FL) | 5 | – | 3 | 8 | – | 5 |
| Duke | 4 | – | 4 | 8 | – | 5 |
| Virginia Tech | 4 | – | 4 | 7 | – | 6 |
| Virginia | 3 | – | 5 | 4 | – | 8 |
| Georgia Tech | 1 | – | 7 | 3 | – | 9 |
Championship: Clemson 45, North Carolina 37
^ – College Football Playoff participant; $ – Conference champion; x – Division champion/co-champions; Rankings from AP Poll

The 2015 Pittsburgh Panthers football team represented the University of Pittsburgh in the 2015 NCAA Division I FBS football season. The Panthers were led by first year head coach Pat Narduzzi and played their home games at Heinz Field. They were a member of the Coastal Division of the Atlantic Coast Conference (ACC). This was Pitt's third season as a member of the ACC. They finished the season 8–5, 6–2 in ACC play to finish in second place in the Coastal Division. They were invited to the Military Bowl where they lost to Navy.

== Schedule ==
| Date | Time | Opponent | Rank | Site | TV | Result | Attendance |
|---|---|---|---|---|---|---|---|
| September 5 | 1:00 p.m. | No. 14 (FCS) Youngstown State* | | Heinz Field; Pittsburgh, PA | ESPN3 | W 45–37 | 49,969 |
| September 12 | 6:00 p.m. | at Akron* | | InfoCision Stadium–Summa Field; Akron, OH | ESPN3 | W 24–7 | 23,425 |
| September 19 | 8:00 p.m. | at Iowa* | | Kinnick Stadium; Iowa City, IA | BTN | L 24–27 | 63,636 |
| October 3 | 12:00 p.m. | at Virginia Tech | | Lane Stadium; Blacksburg, VA | ACCRSN | W 17–13 | 49,120 |
| October 10 | 12:30 p.m. | Virginia^{†} | | Heinz Field; Pittsburgh, PA | ACCN | W 26–19 | 45,237 |
| October 17 | 12:30 p.m. | at Georgia Tech | | Bobby Dodd Stadium; Atlanta, GA | ACCN | W 31–28 | 46,208 |
| October 24 | 12:00 p.m. | at Syracuse | No. 25 | Carrier Dome; Syracuse, NY (rivalry) | ESPNU | W 23–20 | 29,832 |
| October 29 | 7:00 p.m. | North Carolina | No. 23 | Heinz Field; Pittsburgh, PA | ESPN | L 19–26 | 43,049 |
| November 7 | 12:00 p.m. | No. 8 Notre Dame* | | Heinz Field; Pittsburgh, PA (rivalry) | ABC | L 30–42 | 68,400 |
| November 14 | 12:00 p.m. | at Duke | | Wallace Wade Stadium; Durham, NC | ESPNews | W 31–13 | 30,241 |
| November 21 | 3:45 p.m. | Louisville | | Heinz Field; Pittsburgh, PA | ESPNews | W 45–34 | 42,119 |
| November 27 | 12:00 p.m. | Miami (FL) | | Heinz Field; Pittsburgh, PA | ESPN2 | L 24–29 | 40,126 |
| December 28 | 2:30 p.m. | at No. 21 Navy* | | Navy–Marine Corps Memorial Stadium; Annapolis, MD (Military Bowl) | ESPN | L 28–44 | 36,352 |
*Non-conference game; ^{†}Homecoming; Rankings from AP Poll released prior to the game; All times are in Eastern time

== Rankings ==
Ranking movements Legend: ██ Increase in ranking ██ Decrease in ranking — = Not ranked RV = Received votes
| | Week | | | | | | | | | | | | | | | |
| Poll | Pre | 1 | 2 | 3 | 4 | 5 | 6 | 7 | 8 | 9 | 10 | 11 | 12 | 13 | 14 | Final |
|---|---|---|---|---|---|---|---|---|---|---|---|---|---|---|---|---|
| AP | — | — | — | — | — | — | — | 25 | 23 | RV | — | RV | RV | — | — | — |
| Coaches | — | RV | RV | — | — | — | — | RV | 24 | RV | RV | RV | RV | — | RV | — |
| CFP | Not released | | | | | | | | | — | — | — | — | — | — | Not released |

== Coaching staff ==
2015 Pittsburgh Panthers football staff
| Coaching staff: Pat Narduzzi – Head coach; Jim Chaney – Offensive coordinator/quarterbacks; Josh Conklin – Defensive coordinator; Andre Powell – Running backs/special teams; Tom Sims – Defensive line; John Peterson – Offensive line; Renaldo Hill – Cornerbacks; Tim Salem – Tight ends; Kevin Sherman – Wide receivers; Rob Harley – Linebackers | Support staff: Chris LaSala – Assistant Athletic Director/football operations; Bob Junko – Director of player development and High School Relations; Ben Mathers – Director of football operations; Mark Diethorn – Director of Recruiting; Ryan Turnley – Offensive graduate assistant; Mike Shanahan – Offensive graduate assistant; Scott McKillop – Defensive graduate assistant; Phil DeCapito – Defensive graduate assistant | Strength and conditioning staff: Dave Andrews – Head Strength and Conditioning Coach; Freddie Walker – Assistant strength and conditioning coach; Austin Addington-Strapp – Assistant strength and conditioning coach |

== Team players drafted into the NFL ==
| Player | Position | Round | Pick | NFL club |
| Tyler Boyd | Wide receiver | 2 | 55 | Cincinnati Bengals |
