= 2015 Georgia Tech Yellow Jackets football team =

American college football season

2015 Georgia Tech Yellow Jackets football
- Conference: Atlantic Coast Conference
- Coastal Division
- Record: 3–9 (1–7 ACC)
- Head coach: Paul Johnson (8th season)
- Offensive scheme: Flexbone triple option
- Defensive coordinator: Ted Roof (6th season)
- Base defense: Multiple 4–3
- Home stadium: Bobby Dodd Stadium

2015 Atlantic Coast Conference football standings
	Conf.			Overall
Team	W		L	W		L
Atlantic Division
No. 2 Clemson x$^	8	–	0	14	–	1
No. 14 Florida State	6	–	2	10	–	3
Louisville	5	–	3	8	–	5
NC State	3	–	5	7	–	6
Syracuse	2	–	6	4	–	8
Wake Forest	1	–	7	3	–	9
Boston College	0	–	8	3	–	9
Coastal Division
No. 15 North Carolina x	8	–	0	11	–	3
Pittsburgh	6	–	2	8	–	5
Miami (FL)	5	–	3	8	–	5
Duke	4	–	4	8	–	5
Virginia Tech	4	–	4	7	–	6
Virginia	3	–	5	4	–	8
Georgia Tech	1	–	7	3	–	9
Championship: Clemson 45, North Carolina 37
^ – College Football Playoff participant; $ – Conference champion; x – Division champion/co-champions; Rankings from AP Poll

The 2015 Georgia Tech Yellow Jackets football team represented the Georgia Institute of Technology in the 2015 NCAA Division I FBS football season. The Yellow Jackets were led by eighth-year head coach Paul Johnson and played their home games at Bobby Dodd Stadium. They were a member of the Coastal Division in the Atlantic Coast Conference. They finished the season 3–9, 1–7 in ACC play to finish in last place in the Coastal Division, losing six games by a margin of just seven points or less. This was the first time since 1996 that the Yellow Jackets finished with a losing record, breaking their streak of 18 consecutive bowl games.

The season is perhaps best remembered for the “Miracle on Techwood,” in which the Yellow Jackets defeated No. 9 Florida State on a blocked field goal return for a touchdown as time expired. The defeat was the Seminoles’ first ACC loss in 1,113 days.

== Before the season ==
=== Previous season ===
Georgia Tech won its first five games of the previous season, which included comeback victories over Georgia Southern and Virginia Tech, and an end of a five-game losing streak to Miami. After losing back-to-back games to Duke and North Carolina, the Yellow Jackets won out the rest of its regular season, which was capped off with a 30-24 overtime victory over Georgia. The Yellow Jackets represented the Coastal Division in the ACC Championship Game, where they were defeated by Atlantic Division champions Florida State. The Yellow Jackets would be invited to the Orange Bowl, where they defeated Mississippi State 49-34. Georgia Tech ended the season with an 11-3 record and a #8 ranking in the final AP Poll. Georgia Tech also had 3-1 record against top 25 ranked teams, including 2-0 record against SEC teams ranked in top 10.

=== Preseason ===
Head coach Paul Johnson returns for his eighth year at the helm of the program. Justin Thomas, who was Georgia Tech's starting quarterback in 2014, returns for his redshirt junior year.

== Coaching staff ==
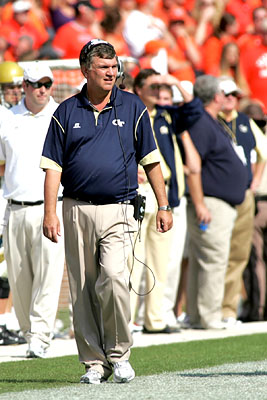
Head Coach Paul Johnson

Name	Position	Seasons at Georgia Tech	Alma mater
Paul Johnson	Head Coach	8	Western Carolina (1979)
Bryan Cook	Quarterbacks/B-Backs	3	Ithaca (1998)
Lamar S. Owens Jr.	A-Backs	8	Maryland (2008)
Al Preston	Wide Receivers	8	Hawaii (1982)
Mike Sewak	Offensive Line	8	Virginia (1981)
Ted Roof	Defensive Coordinator	3	Georgia Tech (1986)
Andy McCollum	Linebackers/Recruiting Coordinator	6	Austin Peay State (1981)
Mike Pelton	Defensive Line	3	Auburn (1999)
Joe Speed	Defensive Backs	6	Navy (1996)
Ray Rychleski	Special Teams Coordinator	2	Penn State (1979)

== Schedule ==
Date	Time	Opponent	Rank	Site	TV	Result	Attendance
September 3	7:30 pm	Alcorn State*	No. 16	Bobby Dodd Stadium; Atlanta, GA	ACCRSN	W 69–6	49,196
September 12	3:30 pm	Tulane*	No. 15	Bobby Dodd Stadium; Atlanta, GA	ACCRSN	W 65–10	50,435
September 19	3:30 pm	at No. 8 Notre Dame*	No. 14	Notre Dame Stadium; Notre Dame, IN (rivalry)	NBC	L 22–30	80,795
September 26	12:00 pm	at Duke	No. 20	Wallace Wade Stadium; Durham, NC	ESPN2	L 20–34	20,101
October 3	3:30 pm	North Carolina		Bobby Dodd Stadium; Atlanta, GA	ESPNU	L 31–38	50,585
October 10	3:30 pm	at No. 6 Clemson		Memorial Stadium; Clemson, SC (rivalry)	ABC/ESPN2	L 24–43	80,983
October 17	12:30 pm	Pittsburgh		Bobby Dodd Stadium; Atlanta, GA	ACCN	L 28–31	46,208
October 24	7:00 pm	No. 9 Florida State^{†}		Bobby Dodd Stadium; Atlanta, GA	ESPN2	W 22–16	55,000
October 31	3:00 pm	at Virginia		Scott Stadium; Charlottesville, VA	ACCRSN	L 21–27	32,308
November 12	7:30 pm	Virginia Tech		Bobby Dodd Stadium; Atlanta, GA (Battle of the Techs)	ESPN	L 21–23	48,522
November 21	12:30 pm	at Miami (FL)		Sun Life Stadium; Miami Gardens, FL	ACCN	L 21–38	51,355
November 28	12:00 pm	Georgia*		Bobby Dodd Stadium; Atlanta, GA (Clean, Old-Fashioned Hate)	ESPN2	L 7–13	55,000
*Non-conference game; ^{†}Homecoming; Rankings from AP Poll (1–8) and CFP Poll (9–15) released prior to game; All times are in Eastern time

- Schedule source:

== Rankings ==
Ranking movements Legend: ██ Increase in ranking ██ Decrease in ranking — = Not ranked RV = Received votes
	Week															
Poll	Pre	1	2	3	4	5	6	7	8	9	10	11	12	13	14	Final
AP	16	15	14	20	—	—	—	—	—	—	—	—	—	—	—	—
Coaches	17	16	16	20	RV	—	—	—	—	—	—	—	—	—	—	—
CFP	Not released									—	—	—	—	—	—	Not released
