= 2015 NC State Wolfpack football team =

American college football season

2015 NC State Wolfpack football

Belk Bowl, L 28–51 vs. Mississippi State
- Conference: Atlantic Coast Conference
- Atlantic Division
- Record: 7–6 (3–5 ACC)
- Head coach: Dave Doeren (3rd season)
- Offensive coordinator: Matt Canada (3rd season)
- Offensive scheme: Pro-style
- Defensive coordinator: Dave Huxtable (3rd season)
- Base defense: 4–3
- Home stadium: Carter–Finley Stadium

2015 Atlantic Coast Conference football standings
	Conf.			Overall
Team	W		L	W		L
Atlantic Division
No. 2 Clemson x$^	8	–	0	14	–	1
No. 14 Florida State	6	–	2	10	–	3
Louisville	5	–	3	8	–	5
NC State	3	–	5	7	–	6
Syracuse	2	–	6	4	–	8
Wake Forest	1	–	7	3	–	9
Boston College	0	–	8	3	–	9
Coastal Division
No. 15 North Carolina x	8	–	0	11	–	3
Pittsburgh	6	–	2	8	–	5
Miami (FL)	5	–	3	8	–	5
Duke	4	–	4	8	–	5
Virginia Tech	4	–	4	7	–	6
Virginia	3	–	5	4	–	8
Georgia Tech	1	–	7	3	–	9
Championship: Clemson 45, North Carolina 37
^ – College Football Playoff participant; $ – Conference champion; x – Division champion/co-champions; Rankings from AP Poll

The 2015 NC State Wolfpack football team represented North Carolina State University in the 2015 NCAA Division I FBS football season. They played their home games at Carter–Finley Stadium in Raleigh, North Carolina. It was their third season under head coach Dave Doeren. They were a member of the Atlantic Division of the Atlantic Coast Conference. They finished the season 7–6, 3–5 in ACC play to finish in fourth place in the Atlantic Division. They were invited to the Belk Bowl, where they lost to Mississippi State.

== Recruiting class ==
College recruiting
Name	Hometown	School	Height	Weight	40^{‡}	Commit date
Eurndraus Bryant; DT	North Charleston, SC	Fort Dorchester HS	6 ft 2 in (1.88 m)	329 lb (149 kg)	-	Feb 3, 2015
Eurndraus Bryant; DT	Recruit ratings: Scout: Rivals: 247Sports: ESPN:					
Johnny Frasier; RB	Princeton, NC	Princeton HS	5 ft 11 in (1.80 m)	216 lb (98 kg)	-	Sep 27, 2014
Johnny Frasier; RB	Recruit ratings: Scout: Rivals: 247Sports: ESPN:					
Reggie Gallaspie; RB	Greensboro, NC	Southern Guilford HS	5 ft 11 in (1.80 m)	211 lb (96 kg)	-	Sep 27, 2014
Reggie Gallaspie; RB	Recruit ratings: Scout: Rivals: 247Sports: ESPN:					
Vernon Grier; WR	Charlotte, NC	Mallard Creek HS	5 ft 11 in (1.80 m)	174 lb (79 kg)	-	Jan 18, 2015
Vernon Grier; WR	Recruit ratings: Scout: Rivals: 247Sports: ESPN:					
Tyler Griffiths; LS	Monroe, NC	Sun Valley HS	6 ft 2 in (1.88 m)	220 lb (100 kg)	-	Jul 26, 2014
Tyler Griffiths; LS	Recruit ratings: Scout: Rivals: 247Sports: ESPN:					
Nyheim Hines; RB	Garner, NC	Garner HS	5 ft 9 in (1.75 m)	183 lb (83 kg)	-	Dec 19, 2014
Nyheim Hines; RB	Recruit ratings: Scout: Rivals: 247Sports: ESPN:					
Quentez Johnson; DT	Ellenwood, GA	Cedar Grove HS	6 ft 3 in (1.91 m)	325 lb (147 kg)	5.2	Jul 4, 2014
Quentez Johnson; DT	Recruit ratings: Scout: Rivals: 247Sports: ESPN:					
T. J. McCoy; OL	Groveland, FL	South Lake HS	6 ft 2 in (1.88 m)	306 lb (139 kg)	-	Sep 13, 2014
T. J. McCoy; OL	Recruit ratings: Scout: Rivals: 247Sports: ESPN:					
Emanuel McGirt; OT	Durham, NC	Hillside HS	6 ft 5 in (1.96 m)	270 lb (120 kg)	-	Nov 9, 2014
Emanuel McGirt; OT	Recruit ratings: Scout: Rivals: 247Sports: ESPN:					
Jakobi Meyers; QB/DT	Lithonia, GA	Arabia Mountain HS	6 ft 1 in (1.85 m)	173 lb (78 kg)	-	Jan 19, 2015
Jakobi Meyers; QB/DT	Recruit ratings: Scout: Rivals: 247Sports: ESPN:					
Jarius Morehead; S	Whitsett, NC	Eastern Guilford HS	6 ft 0 in (1.83 m)	185 lb (84 kg)	-	Jun 14, 2014
Jarius Morehead; S	Recruit ratings: Scout: Rivals: 247Sports: ESPN:					
Riley Nicholson; LB	Kissimmee, FL	Osceola HS	6 ft 0 in (1.83 m)	223 lb (101 kg)	4.6	Jul 18, 2014
Riley Nicholson; LB	Recruit ratings: Scout: Rivals: 247Sports: ESPN:					
Emmanuel Olenga; DE	Charlotte, NC	Olympic HS	6 ft 5 in (1.96 m)	239 lb (108 kg)	4.7	Jan 25, 2015
Emmanuel Olenga; DE	Recruit ratings: Scout: Rivals: 247Sports: ESPN:					
Freddie Phillips; S	Pelion, SC	Pelion HS	6 ft 1 in (1.85 m)	194 lb (88 kg)	-	May 20, 2014
Freddie Phillips; S	Recruit ratings: Scout: Rivals: 247Sports: ESPN:					
Tyrone Riley; DE	Savannah, GA	Calvary Baptist HS	6 ft 6 in (1.98 m)	224 lb (102 kg)	-	Jan 30, 2015
Tyrone Riley; DE	Recruit ratings: Scout: Rivals: 247Sports: ESPN:					
Darian Roseboro; DT	Lincolnton, NC	Lincolnton HS	6 ft 4 in (1.93 m)	279 lb (127 kg)	-	Oct 11, 2014
Darian Roseboro; DT	Recruit ratings: Scout: Rivals: 247Sports: ESPN:					
Brian Sessoms; WR	Winston-Salem, NC	Carver HS	5 ft 8 in (1.73 m)	168 lb (76 kg)	4.4	Apr 12, 2014
Brian Sessoms; WR	Recruit ratings: Scout: Rivals: 247Sports: ESPN:					
Freddie Simmons; WR	Bethlehem, PA	Bethlehem Catholic HS	6 ft 3 in (1.91 m)	177 lb (80 kg)	-	Jan 20, 2015
Freddie Simmons; WR	Recruit ratings: Scout: Rivals: 247Sports: ESPN:					
James Smith-Williams; OLB	Raleigh, NC	Milbrook HS	6 ft 4 in (1.93 m)	206 lb (93 kg)	-	Jul 22, 2014
James Smith-Williams; OLB	Recruit ratings: Scout: Rivals: 247Sports: ESPN:					
Philip Walton; OT	Charlotte, NC	Charlotte Christian HS	6 ft 7 in (2.01 m)	261 lb (118 kg)	4.9	Apr 1, 2014
Philip Walton; OT	Recruit ratings: Scout: Rivals: 247Sports: ESPN:					
Aaron Wiltz; OL	Baton Rouge, LA	Catholic HS	6 ft 5 in (1.96 m)	273 lb (124 kg)	-	Dec 14, 2014
Aaron Wiltz; OL	Recruit ratings: Scout: Rivals: 247Sports: ESPN:					
Daris Workman; OT	San Pablo, CA	Conta Costa CC	6 ft 5 in (1.96 m)	271 lb (123 kg)	-	Oct 11, 2014
Daris Workman; OT	Recruit ratings: Scout: Rivals: 247Sports: ESPN:					
Overall recruit ranking: Scout: 38 Rivals: 35 247Sports: 30 ESPN: 33
‡ Refers to 40-yard dash; Note: In many cases, Scout, Rivals, 247Sports, On3, and ESPN may conflict in their listings of height, weight and 40 time.; In these cases, the average was taken. ESPN grades are on a 100-point scale.; Sources: "2015 North Carolina St. Commitments". Rivals.; "2015 - NC State - Football Recruiting". Scout.; "College Football Recruiting Schools". ESPN.; "Scout.com Team Recruiting Rankings". Scout.; "2015 Team Ranking". Rivals.com.; "NC State 2015 Football Commits". 247Sports.

== Schedule ==
Date	Time	Opponent	Site	TV	Result	Attendance
September 5	6:00 pm	Troy*	Carter–Finley Stadium; Raleigh, NC	ESPN3	W 49–21	57,451
September 12	6:00 pm	No. 19 (FCS) Eastern Kentucky*	Carter–Finley Stadium; Raleigh, NC	ESPN3	W 35–0	57,600
September 19	7:00 pm	at Old Dominion*	Foreman Field; Norfolk, VA	ASN	W 38–14	20,118
September 26	8:00 pm	at South Alabama*	Ladd–Peebles Stadium; Mobile, AL	ESPNews	W 63–13	21,314
October 3	12:30 pm	Louisville	Carter–Finley Stadium; Raleigh, NC	ACCN	L 13–20	56,417
October 9	8:00 pm	at Virginia Tech	Lane Stadium; Blacksburg, VA	ESPN	L 13–28	61,183
October 24	12:00 pm	at Wake Forest	BB&T Field; Winston-Salem, NC (rivalry)	ACCRSN	W 35–17	30,464
October 31	3:30 pm	No. 3 Clemson†	Carter–Finley Stadium; Raleigh, NC (Textile Bowl)	ABC/ESPN2	L 41–56	57,600
November 7	12:30 pm	at Boston College	Alumni Stadium; Chestnut Hill, MA	ACCN	W 24–8	28,533
November 14	12:30 pm	at No. 19 Florida State	Doak Campbell Stadium; Tallahassee, FL	ACCN	L 17–34	71,210
November 21	12:30 pm	Syracuse	Carter–Finley Stadium; Raleigh, NC	ACCN	W 42–29	55,260
November 28	3:30 pm	No. 11 North Carolina	Carter–Finley Stadium; Raleigh, NC (rivalry)	ABC/ESPN2	L 34–45	57,600
December 30	3:30 pm	vs. Mississippi State	Bank of America Stadium; Charlotte, NC (Belk Bowl)	ESPN	L 28–51	46,423
*Non-conference game; Rankings from AP Poll released prior to the game; All times are in Eastern time

== Coaching staff ==
NC State Wolfpack coaches

Head coach

- Dave Doeren

Assistant coaches

- Matt Canada – Offensive coordinator and Quarterbacks coach
- Dave Huxtable – Defensive coordinator and Linebackers coach
- Eddie Faulkner – Special teams coordinator/tight ends coach/fullbacks coach
- George Barlow – Cornerbacks coach
- Desmond Kitchings– Running backs coach/recruiting coordinator
- George McDonald – Wide receivers coach
- Ryan Nielsen – Defensive line coach/run-game coordinator for defense
- Mike uremovich – Offensive line coach
- Clayton White – Safeties coach/co-special teams coordinator
- Jason veltkamp – Strength and conditioning coach
- Ty Howle – Graduate assistant

== Roster ==
2015 NC State Wolfpack
Quarterback: 19 Evan Braband – (redshirt) freshman (6'2, 197); 12 Jacoby Brissett – (redshirt) senior (6'4, 231); 14 Woody Cornwell – (redshirt) freshman (6'1, 201); Jordan dawson – (redshirt) sophomore (6'1, 190); 11 Garrett Leatham – (redshirt) senior (6'4, 214); 2 Jalan McClendon – (redshirt) freshman (6'5, 203); 5 Josh Taylor – junior (5'11, 187); Running back: 20 Brady Bodine – (redshirt) freshman (5'10, 200); 21 Matt Dayes – junior (5'9, 205); Reggie gallaspy ii – freshman (5'10, 209); 34 Ben Grazen – (redshirt) sophomore (5'9, 185); 27 Dakwa Nichols – (redshirt) sophomore (5'9, 188); 44 Devin O'Connor – (redshirt) junior (6'3, 232); 10 Shadrach Thornton – senior (6'1, 209); Wide receiver: 15 Johnathan Alston – junior (6'0, 198); 13 Bra'Lon Cherry – junior (5'11, 188); 30 Gavin Locklear – (redshirt) sophomore (5'10, 180); 88 Stephen Louis – sophomore (6'2, 210); 19 Maurice Morgan – (redshirt) senior (6'2, 246); 32 Stephen Morrison – (redshirt) freshman (5'11, 193); 3 Jumichael Ramos – junior (6'2, 199); 87 Maurice Trowell – (redshirt) freshman (5'11, 188); Tight end: 89 Benson Browne – Graduate (6'5, 264); 48 Cole Cook – sophomore (6'6, 240); 86 David J. Grinnage – (redshirt) junior (6'5, 264); 28 Jaylen Samuels – sophomore (5'11, 236); 85 Micah Till – (redshirt) freshman (6'5, 274)	Offensive line: 50 Tony Adams – sophomore (6'2, 318); 71 Alex Barr – (redshirt) senior (6'7, 316); 52 Cole Blankenship – (redshirt) sophomore (6'2, 287); 57 Peter Daniel – (redshirt) sophomore (6'6, 271); 53 Tyler Jones – (redshirt) freshman (6'3, 292); 56 Bryce Kennedy – (redshirt) junior (6'3, 305); 68 Zak Kuder – (redshirt) freshman (6'7, 261); T. J. McCoy – freshman (6'1, 312); 70 Terronne Prescod – (redshirt) freshman (6'5, 333); 67 Evan Pritt – (redshirt) sophomore (6'3, 269); 64 Tylar Reagan – (redshirt) sophomore (6'4, 294); 66 Will Richardson – (redshirt) freshman (6'5, 302); 60 Quinton Schooley – senior (6'3, 296); 76 Eric Shute – (redshirt) freshman (6'5, 278); 54 Joe Thuney – Graduate (6'5, 293); 59 John Tu'uta – (redshirt) junior (6'2, 280); Defensive line: 54 Davion Allred – (redshirt) sophomore (6'0, 211); 92 Hampton Billips – (redshirt) freshman (6'7, 230); 38 Garrett Bradbury – (redshirt) freshman (6'3, 261); 43 Coult Culler – (redshirt) freshman (6'5, 260); 96 Kenton Gibbs – (redshirt) sophomore (6'2, 296); 98 B. J. Hill – sophomore (6'4, 284); 87 Pharaoh McKever – (redshirt) sophomore (6'6, 245); 97 Deshawn Middleton – (redshirt) freshman (6'1, 301); 94 Monty Nelson – junior (6'2, 312); 90 Mike Rose – (redshirt) senior (6'3, 267); Darian roseboro – freshman (6'4, 283); 35 Kentavius Street – sophomore (6'2, 274); Linebacker: 49 Bradley Chubb – sophomore (6'4, 252); 4 Jerod Fernandez – (redshirt) sophomore (6'0, 224); Ford howell – (redshirt) sophomore (6'1, 243); 33 Ty Linton – (redshirt) freshman (6'2, 254); 58 Airius Moore – sophomore (6'0, 234); Riley Nicholson – freshman (6'0, 222); 45 Artemis Robinson – (redshirt) sophomore (6'0, 225); 46 Ernie Robinson – (redshirt) junior (6'1, 226); 42 M. J. Salahuddin – (redshirt) junior (6'2, 233); 48 Bryan Smith – (redshirt) sophomore (6'1, 244); James Smith-Williams – freshman (6'4, 196); 36 Max Stoffer – (redshirt) freshman (6'3, 229)	Defensive back: 26 Trace Batten – (redshirt) freshman (5'10, 195); 24 Shawn Boone – sophomore (5'10, 193); 41 Cole Boroughs – (redshirt) junior (6'0, 190); 6 Tim Buckley – (redshirt) senior (6'0, 197); 11 Juston Burris – Graduate (6'1, 207); 25 Niles Clark – (redshirt) junior (5'11, 190); 21 Elliot Davis – (redshirt) freshman (6'1, 182); 20 Hakim Jones – (redshirt) senior (6'2, 200); 2 Josh Jones – (redshirt) sophomore (6'2, 212); 12 Nicholas Lacy – (redshirt) sophomore (5'9, 180); 27 Kalen McCain – (redshirt) freshman (6'1, 190); 14 Malcom Means – (redshirt) sophomore (6'1, 189); 7 Sean Paul – (redshirt) sophomore (5'11, 186); Freddie Phillips, Jr. – freshman (6'1, 188); 31 Germaine Pratt – sophomore (6'3, 225); 37 Josh Sessoms – (redshirt) junior (6'2, 200); 30 Mike Stevens – sophomore (5'10, 190); 29 Jack Tocho – junior (6'0, 201); 33 Charlie Twitty – (redshirt) junior (5'9, 181); 22 Troy Vincent, Jr. – sophomore (5'9, 199); 28 Robert Wilcox – (redshirt) freshman (6'0, 195); 34 Dexter Wright – (redshirt) freshman (6'2, 226); 8 Dravious Wright – junior (5'10, 203); Special teams: Kyle bambard – freshman (5'8, 183) (PK); 62 R. C. Brunstetter – (redshirt) freshman (6'3, 215) (LS); A. J. Cole III – freshman (6'4, 236) (P); 52 Ben Garnett – (redshirt) junior (6'0, 231) (LS); 37 Jackson Maples – (redshirt) freshman (6'0, 190) (PK); Duncan musselwhite – freshman (6'2, 207) (LS); 47 William Stephenson – (redshirt) junior (6'3, 182) (P)
