= 2015 Syracuse Orange football team =

American college football season

2015 Syracuse Orange football
- Conference: Atlantic Coast Conference
- Atlantic Division
- Record: 4–8 (2–6 ACC)
- Head coach: Scott Shafer (3rd season)
- Offensive coordinator: Tim Lester (1st season)
- Offensive scheme: West Coast
- Defensive coordinator: Chuck Bullough (3rd season)
- Base defense: 4–3
- Home stadium: Carrier Dome

2015 Atlantic Coast Conference football standings
	Conf.			Overall
Team	W		L	W		L
Atlantic Division
No. 2 Clemson x$^	8	–	0	14	–	1
No. 14 Florida State	6	–	2	10	–	3
Louisville	5	–	3	8	–	5
NC State	3	–	5	7	–	6
Syracuse	2	–	6	4	–	8
Wake Forest	1	–	7	3	–	9
Boston College	0	–	8	3	–	9
Coastal Division
No. 15 North Carolina x	8	–	0	11	–	3
Pittsburgh	6	–	2	8	–	5
Miami (FL)	5	–	3	8	–	5
Duke	4	–	4	8	–	5
Virginia Tech	4	–	4	7	–	6
Virginia	3	–	5	4	–	8
Georgia Tech	1	–	7	3	–	9
Championship: Clemson 45, North Carolina 37
^ – College Football Playoff participant; $ – Conference champion; x – Division champion/co-champions; Rankings from AP Poll

The 2015 Syracuse Orange football team represented Syracuse University in the 2015 NCAA Division I FBS football season. The Orange were led by third year head coach Scott Shafer and played their home games at the Carrier Dome. They were members of the Atlantic Division of the Atlantic Coast Conference. They finished the season 4–8, 2–6 in ACC play to finish in fifth place in the Atlantic Division.

On November 23, head coach Scott Shafer was fired. He stayed on to coach their final game on November 28. He finished at Syracuse with a three-year record of 14–23.

== Schedule ==
Date	Time	Opponent	Site	TV	Result	Attendance
September 4	7:00 pm	Rhode Island*	Carrier Dome; Syracuse, NY	TWCS NY/ESPN3	W 47–0	30,112
September 12	12:30 pm	Wake Forest	Carrier Dome; Syracuse, NY	ACCN	W 30–17	26,670
September 19	12:30 pm	Central Michigan*	Carrier Dome; Syracuse, NY	RSN	W 30–27 ^{OT}	27,949
September 26	12:00 pm	No. 8 LSU*	Carrier Dome; Syracuse, NY	ESPN	L 24–34	43,101
October 10	3:30 pm	at South Florida*	Raymond James Stadium; Tampa, FL	CBSSN	L 24–45	27,235
October 17	3:30 pm	at Virginia	Scott Stadium; Charlottesville, VA	ACCRSN	L 38–44 ^{3OT}	39,223
October 24	12:00 pm	No. 25 Pittsburgh^{†}	Carrier Dome; Syracuse, NY (rivalry)	ESPNU	L 20–23	29,832
October 31	12:00 pm	at No. 17 Florida State	Doak Campbell Stadium; Tallahassee, FL	ABC	L 21–45	67,630
November 7	12:30 pm	at Louisville	Papa John's Cardinal Stadium; Louisville, KY	ACCN	L 17–41	46,158
November 14	3:30 pm	No. 1 Clemson	Carrier Dome; Syracuse, NY	ABC/ESPN2	L 27–37	36,736
November 21	12:30 pm	at NC State	Carter–Finley Stadium; Raleigh, NC	ACCN	L 29–42	55,260
November 28	12:30 pm	Boston College	Carrier Dome; Syracuse, NY	ACCRSN	W 20–17	30,317
*Non-conference game; ^{†}Homecoming; Rankings from Coaches' Poll released prior to the game; All times are in Eastern time

== Game summaries ==
=== Rhode Island ===
	1	2	3	4	Total
Rams	0	0	0	0	0
Orange	14	17	9	7	47

=== Wake Forest ===
	1	2	3	4	Total
Demon Deacons	7	10	0	0	17
Orange	3	10	7	10	30

=== Central Michigan ===
	1	2	3	4	OT	Total
Chippewas	3	7	7	7	3	27
Orange	10	14	0	0	6	30

=== LSU ===
	1	2	3	4	Total
#8 Tigers	7	0	17	10	34
Orange	0	3	7	14	24

=== At South Florida ===
	1	2	3	4	Total
Orange	0	3	14	7	24
Bulls	0	10	21	14	45

=== At Virginia ===
	1	2	3	4	OT	2OT	3OT	Total
Orange	0	21	3	0	7	7	0	38
Cavaliers	0	14	0	10	7	7	6	44

=== Pittsburgh ===
	1	2	3	4	Total
#25 Panthers	3	10	0	10	23
Orange	7	10	0	3	20

=== At Florida State ===
	1	2	3	4	Total
Orange	7	7	0	7	21
#17 Seminoles	14	14	7	10	45

=== At Louisville ===
	1	2	3	4	Total
Orange	10	0	0	7	17
Cardinals	7	14	10	10	41

=== Clemson ===
	1	2	3	4	Total
#1 Tigers	21	10	0	6	37
Orange	14	3	7	3	27

=== At NC State ===
	1	2	3	4	Total
Orange	3	6	7	13	29
Wolfpack	14	7	14	7	42

=== Boston College ===
	1	2	3	4	Total
Eagles	7	0	7	3	17
Orange	0	10	7	3	20
