= 2015 Louisville Cardinals football team =

American college football season

2015 Louisville Cardinals football

Music City Bowl champion

Music City Bowl, W 27–21 vs. Texas A&M
- Conference: Atlantic Coast Conference
- Atlantic Division
- Record: 8–5 (5–3 ACC)
- Head coach: Bobby Petrino (6th season)
- Offensive coordinator: Garrick McGee (2nd season)
- Offensive scheme: Multiple
- Defensive coordinator: Todd Grantham (2nd season)
- Base defense: 3–4
- Home stadium: Papa John's Cardinal Stadium

2015 Atlantic Coast Conference football standings
| | Conf. | | | Overall |
| Team | W | | L | W | | L |
|---|---|---|---|---|---|---|
Atlantic Division
| No. 2 Clemson x$^ | 8 | – | 0 | 14 | – | 1 |
| No. 14 Florida State | 6 | – | 2 | 10 | – | 3 |
| Louisville | 5 | – | 3 | 8 | – | 5 |
| NC State | 3 | – | 5 | 7 | – | 6 |
| Syracuse | 2 | – | 6 | 4 | – | 8 |
| Wake Forest | 1 | – | 7 | 3 | – | 9 |
| Boston College | 0 | – | 8 | 3 | – | 9 |
Coastal Division
| No. 15 North Carolina x | 8 | – | 0 | 11 | – | 3 |
| Pittsburgh | 6 | – | 2 | 8 | – | 5 |
| Miami (FL) | 5 | – | 3 | 8 | – | 5 |
| Duke | 4 | – | 4 | 8 | – | 5 |
| Virginia Tech | 4 | – | 4 | 7 | – | 6 |
| Virginia | 3 | – | 5 | 4 | – | 8 |
| Georgia Tech | 1 | – | 7 | 3 | – | 9 |
Championship: Clemson 45, North Carolina 37
^ – College Football Playoff participant; $ – Conference champion; x – Division champion/co-champions; Rankings from AP Poll

The 2015 Louisville Cardinals football team represented the University of Louisville in the 2015 NCAA Division I FBS football season. The Cardinals were led by sixth-year head coach Bobby Petrino, who began his second stint at Louisville in 2014 season after eight years away. The team played its 18th season at its current home of Papa John's Cardinal Stadium in Louisville, Kentucky. They competed in the Atlantic Coast Conference in the Atlantic Division. They finished the season 8–5, 5–3 in ACC play to finish in third place in the Atlantic Division. They were invited to the Music City Bowl where they defeated Texas A&M.

== Personnel ==
=== Coaching staff ===
| Name | Position | Seasons at Louisville | Alma mater | Before Louisville |
|---|---|---|---|---|
| Bobby Petrino | Head coach | 6 | Carroll College (1983) | Western Kentucky – Head coach (2014) |
| Garrick McGee | Offensive coordinator / quarterbacks coach / assistant head coach | 2 | Oklahoma (1996) | UAB – Head coach (2013) |
| Todd Grantham | Defensive coordinator / outside linebackers coach | 2 | Virginia Tech (1988) | Georgia – Defensive coordinator (2013) |
| Greg Brown | Safeties Coach / recruiting coordinator | 2 | UTEP (1980) | Alabama – Safeties Coach (2013) |
| Terrell Buckley | Cornerbacks coach | 2 | Florida State (1991) | Akron – Cornerbacks Coach (2013) |
| Tony Grantham | Inside linebackers coach / special teams coordinator | 2 | Radford (2000) | Navy – Outside linebackers coach (2013) |
| Chris Klenakis | Offensive line coach / running game coordinator | 2 | Nevada (1992) | Iowa State – Offensive line coach (2013) |
| L.D. Scott | Defensive line coach | 2 | Louisville (2009) | Western Kentucky – Defensive ends coach (2013) |
| Kolby Smith | Running backs coach | 2 | Louisville (2006) | Western Kentucky – Running backs coach (2013) |
| Lamar Thomas | Wide receivers coach | 2 | Miami (1992) | Western Kentucky – Wide receivers coach (2013) |
| Joe Miday | Director of strength and conditioning | 1 | Marshall (2008) | Western Kentucky – Director of strength and conditioning (2013) |
| Scott Wilks | Assistant director of strength and conditioning | 2 | Marshall (2009) | Western Kentucky – Assistant director of strength and conditioning (2013) |
| Andrew Wagner | Director of football operations | 2 | Butler (1999) | Western Kentucky – Director of football operations (2013) |

== Roster ==
2015 Louisville Cardinals Football
| Quarterbacks: 7 Reggie Bonnafon – sophomore (6'3, 209); 8 Lamar Jackson – freshman (6'3, 196) *; 11 Will Gardner – (redshirt) junior (6'5, 220); 13 Ethan Horton – sophomore (6'0, 208); 14 Kyle Bolin – (redshirt) sophomore (6'2, 208); Running backs: 4 Corvin Lamb – (redshirt) senior (5'9, 208); 12 Trey Smith – freshman (6'0, 215) *; 23 Brandon Radcliff – (redshirt) junior (5'9, 214); 27 L. J. Scott – sophomore (6'0, 226); 31 Mitchell Allen – freshman (5'9, 191) *; 31 Darius Skinner – (redshirt) senior (5'7, 190); 33 Malin Jones – junior (6'0, 225); 34 Jeremy Smith – sophomore (6'2, 225) *; Fullbacks: 37 Conner Kronk – sophomore (5'11, 220); 39 Griffin Uhl – (redshirt) junior (6'2, 264); Wide receivers: 1 Alphonso Carter – sophomore (6'3, 205); 2 Jamari Staples – junior (6'4, 195) *; 3 Pat Thomas – junior (6'4, 190); 9 Traveon Samuel – freshman (5'7, 175); 17 James Quick – junior (6'1, 191); 19 Ja'Quay Savage – senior (6'3, 214); 26 Jalen Washington – freshman (5'7, 177); 38 Chris Miele – (redshirt) sophomore (6'2, 190); 81 Emonee Spence – freshman (6'3, 194) *; 82 Dontez Byrd – (redshirt) sophomore (5'11, 170); 84 Gio Pascascio – junior (6'3, 185); 85 Cody Swabek – (redshirt) freshman (6'1, 168); 86 Devonte Peete – freshman (6'6, 203) *; 87 Jaylen Smith – freshman (6'4, 184) *; 88 Javonte Bagley – sophomore (6'3, 192); Tight ends: 18 Cole Hikutini – junior (6'5, 240) *; 42 Tyler Polston – sophomore (6'2, 240); 44 Paul Logsdon – sophomore (6'3, 210); 80 Charles Standberry – sophomore (6'3, 226); 83 Micky Crum – (redshirt) freshman (6'4, 257); 89 Keith Towbridge – junior (6'5, 261) | Offensive linemen: 50 Khalil Hunter – junior (6'4, 300) *; 54 Kevin Austin – sophomore (6'3, 307); 56 Kiola Mahoni – sophomore (6'3, 300) *; 60 Tyler Haycraft – freshman (6'3, 269); 61 Tobijah Hughley – (redshirt) junior (6'3, 289); 62 T.C. Klusman – (redshirt) junior (6'3, 275); 63 Nathan Scheler – freshman (6'1, 270); 64 Gabe Ahner – (redshirt) junior (6'3, 289); 65 Luke Schultheiss – sophomore (6'1, 284); 68 Danny Burns – (redshirt) freshman (6'6, 303); 70 Toriano Roundtree – sophomore (6'8, 305); 71 Chandler Jones – freshman (6'4, 300) *; 72 Lukayus McNeil – (redshirt) freshman (6'6, 313); 73 Pedro Sibiea – (redshirt) junior (6'3, 300); 74 Geron Christian – freshman (6'6, 320) *; 75 Skylar Lacy – (redshirt) sophomore (6'6, 306); 76 Kelby Johnson – senior (6'7, 297); 78 Aaron Epps – (redshirt) senior (6'7, 288); 79 Kenny Thomas Jr. – freshman (6'6, 320); Defensive line: 14 Drew Bailey – junior (6'5, 285) *; 44 Pio Vatuvei – DE – senior (6'2, 296); 59 Aaron Ahner – DT – (redshirt) senior (6'3, 275); 90 Johnny Richardson – DE – (redshirt) sophomore (6'3, 322); 94 G.G. Robinson – DT – freshman (6'4, 290) *; 95 Kyle Shortridge – DT – (redshirt) sophomore (6'2, 305); 97 DeAngelo Brown – DT – (redshirt) junior (6'1, 308); 98 Sheldon Rankins – DE – senior (6'2, 303); Kickers: 32 Blaton Creque – freshman (5'11, 170); 35 Anthony George – (redshirt) junior (6'1, 190); 47 Jon Brown – sophomore (5'10, 202); Long snappers: 46 Brendan Lowery – freshman (5'11, 205); 49 Colin Holba – (redshirt) junior (6'5, 233); Punters: 29 Mason King – freshman (6'3, 175); 40 Joshua Appleby – senior (6'3, 222); 45 John Wallace – (redshirt) senior (6'0, 190) | Linebackers: 1 Keith Brown – (redshirt) junior (6'1, 237); 13 James Burgess – senior (6'0, 229); 32 Stacy Thomas – (redshirt) sophomore (6'1, 225); 42 Isaac Stewart – (redshirt) freshman (6'2, 236); 43 Damien Smith – freshman (6'1, 215); 46 Lamar Atkins – (redshirt) junior (5'11, 236); 48 Tim Bonner – freshman (6'4, 215) *; 51 Royce Donovan – (redshirt) junior (6'2, 224); 52 Nick Dawson-Brents – (redshirt) junior (6'3, 265); 53 Amonte Caban – freshman (6'1, 226) *; 55 Keith Kelsey – junior (6'1, 236); 57 Finesse Middleton – (redshirt) sophomore (6'0, 242); 58 Jonathan Greenard – freshman (6'4, 226) *; 91 Trevon Young – senior (6'4, 229); 92 Devonte Fields – junior (6'4, 245) *; 96 Henry Famurewa – OLB – sophomore (6'2, 245); 99 James Hearns – (redshirt) sophomore (6'3, 257); Cornerbacks: 3 Cornelius Sturghill – (redshirt) freshman (5'11, 186); 6 Shaq Wiggins – sophomore (5'10, 171); 10 Jaire Alexander – freshman (5'11, 170) *; 15 Trumaine Washington – sophomore (5'10, 183); 21 Devontre Parnell – (redshirt) junior (5'11, 184); 24 Zykiesis Cannon – sophomore (6'0, 195); 26 Duke Culver – sophomore (6'0, 186); 34 George Clements – senior (6'1, 185); 39 Aaron Floyd – freshman (5'10, 172); 41 Kevin Elijah – junior (5'7, 156); 24 Kevon Dunbar – DB – freshman (6'1, 192); 39 John Stitch – DB – junior (5'10, 185); Safeties: 5 Khane Pass – freshman (6'1, 200) *; 11 Dee Smith – freshman (6'1, 200) *; 22 Chucky Williams – (redshirt) sophomore (6'2, 204); 25 Josh Harvey-Clemons – junior (6'5, 230); 27 Jermaine Reve – (redshirt) senior (6'0, 192); 28 Terrence Ross – (redshirt) sophomore (6'1, 208); 36 Kevin Houchins – (redshirt) junior (5'11, 201) |
* : 2015 Louisville Cardinals Football Signed

== Schedule ==
Louisville announced their 2015 football schedule on January 29, 2015. The 2015 schedule consist of six home games, five away games and one neutral site game in the regular season. The Cardinals will host ACC foes Boston College, Clemson, Syracuse, and Virginia, and will travel to Florida State, NC State, Pittsburgh, and Wake Forest.

| Date | Time | Opponent | Site | TV | Result | Attendance |
|---|---|---|---|---|---|---|
| September 5 | 3:30 p.m. | vs. No. 6 Auburn* | Georgia Dome; Atlanta, GA (Chick-fil-A Kickoff Game) | CBS | L 24–31 | 73,927 |
| September 12 | 12:00 p.m. | Houston* | Papa John's Cardinal Stadium; Louisville, KY | ACCRSN | L 31–34 | 50,019 |
| September 17 | 7:30 p.m. | No. 11 Clemson | Papa John's Cardinal Stadium; Louisville, KY | ESPN | L 17–20 | 55,396 |
| September 26 | 6:00 p.m. | Samford* | Papa John's Cardinal Stadium; Louisville, KY | ESPN3 | W 45–3 | 50,121 |
| October 3 | 12:30 p.m. | at NC State | Carter–Finley Stadium; Raleigh, NC | ACCN | W 20–13 | 56,417 |
| October 17 | 12:00 p.m. | at No. 11 Florida State | Doak Campbell Stadium; Tallahassee, FL | ESPN | L 21–41 | 71,225 |
| October 24 | 12:30 p.m. | Boston College^{†} | Papa John's Cardinal Stadium; Louisville, KY | ACCN | W 17–14 | 41,486 |
| October 30 | 7:00 p.m. | at Wake Forest | BB&T Field; Winston-Salem, NC | ESPN2 | W 20–19 | 24,922 |
| November 7 | 12:30 p.m. | Syracuse | Papa John's Cardinal Stadium; Louisville, KY | ACCN | W 41–17 | 46,158 |
| November 14 | 12:30 p.m. | Virginia | Papa John's Cardinal Stadium; Louisville, KY | ACCRSN | W 38–31 | 51,233 |
| November 21 | 3:45 p.m. | at Pittsburgh | Heinz Field; Pittsburgh, PA | ESPNews | L 34–45 | 42,119 |
| November 28 | 12:00 p.m. | at Kentucky* | Commonwealth Stadium; Lexington, KY (Governor's Cup) | SECN | W 38–24 | 62,512 |
| December 30 | 7:00 p.m. | vs. Texas A&M* | Nissan Stadium; Nashville, TN (Music City Bowl) | ESPN | W 27–21 | 50,478 |
*Non-conference game; ^{†}Homecoming; Rankings from AP Poll released prior to game; All times are in Eastern time

Schedule source:
