= 2015 Virginia Tech Hokies football team =

American college football season

2015 Virginia Tech Hokies football

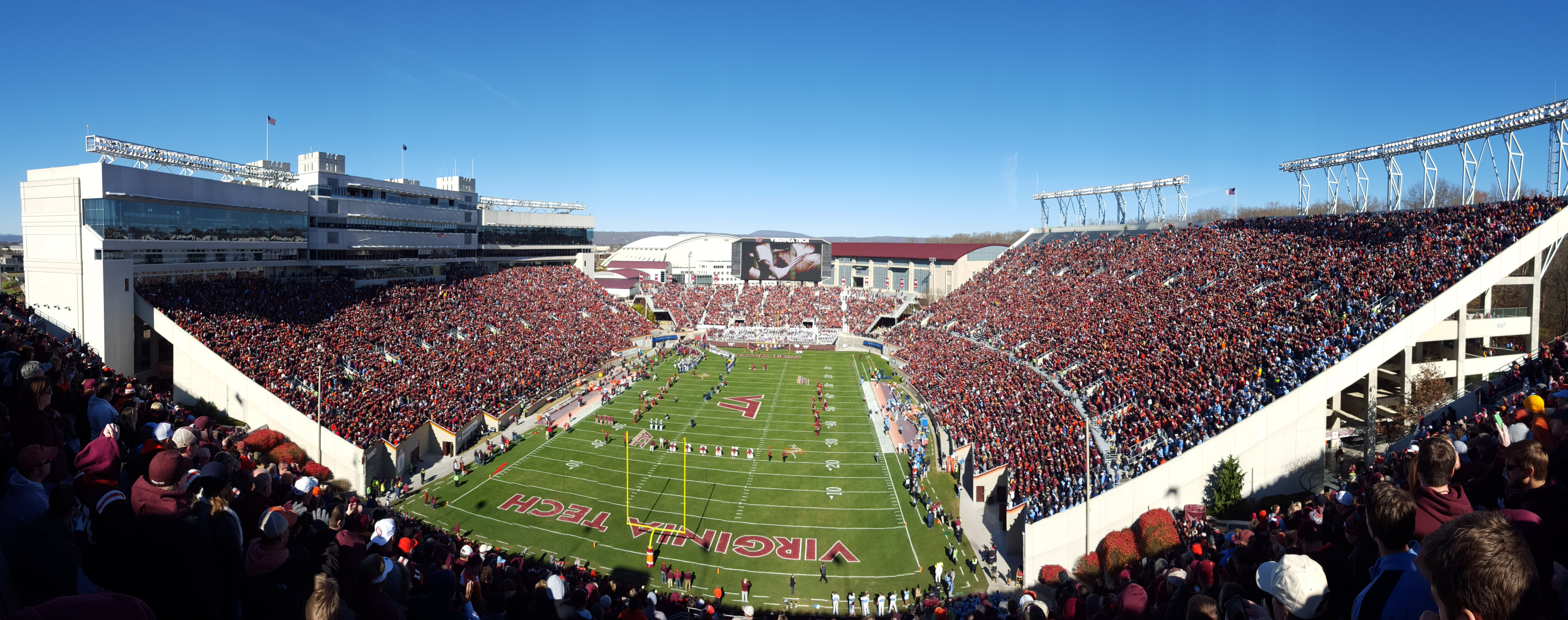
- Lane Stadium during the 2015 Home finale against UNC

Independence Bowl champion

Independence Bowl, W 55–52 vs. Tulsa
- Conference: Atlantic Coast Conference
- Coastal Division
- Record: 7–6 (4–4 ACC)
- Head coach: Frank Beamer (29th season)
- Offensive coordinator: Scot Loeffler (3rd season)
- Offensive scheme: Pro-style
- Defensive coordinator: Bud Foster (21st season)
- Base defense: 4–4
- Home stadium: Lane Stadium

2015 Atlantic Coast Conference football standings
	Conf.			Overall
Team	W		L	W		L
Atlantic Division
No. 2 Clemson x$^	8	–	0	14	–	1
No. 14 Florida State	6	–	2	10	–	3
Louisville	5	–	3	8	–	5
NC State	3	–	5	7	–	6
Syracuse	2	–	6	4	–	8
Wake Forest	1	–	7	3	–	9
Boston College	0	–	8	3	–	9
Coastal Division
No. 15 North Carolina x	8	–	0	11	–	3
Pittsburgh	6	–	2	8	–	5
Miami (FL)	5	–	3	8	–	5
Duke	4	–	4	8	–	5
Virginia Tech	4	–	4	7	–	6
Virginia	3	–	5	4	–	8
Georgia Tech	1	–	7	3	–	9
Championship: Clemson 45, North Carolina 37
^ – College Football Playoff participant; $ – Conference champion; x – Division champion/co-champions; Rankings from AP Poll

The 2015 Virginia Tech Hokies football team represented the Virginia Tech in the 2015 NCAA Division I FBS football season. The Hokies were led by 29th-year head coach Frank Beamer, who retired following the conclusion of the season and play their home games at Lane Stadium in Blacksburg, Virginia. They are members of the Coastal Division of the Atlantic Coast Conference. They finished the season 7–6, 4–4 in ACC play to finish in a tie for fourth in the Coastal Division. They were invited to the Independence Bowl where they defeated Tulsa.

On November 1, Beamer announced he would retire at the end of the season. He finished at Virginia Tech with a 29-year record of 238–121–2.

== Schedule ==
Date	Time	Opponent	Site	TV	Result	Attendance
September 7	8:00 p.m.	No. 1 Ohio State*	Lane Stadium; Blacksburg, VA	ESPN	L 24–42	65,632
September 12	3:30 p.m.	Furman*	Lane Stadium; Blacksburg, VA	ESPN3	W 42–3	60,118
September 19	3:30 p.m.	at Purdue*	Ross–Ade Stadium; West Lafayette, IN	ESPNU	W 51–24	45,759
September 26	3:30 p.m.	at East Carolina*	Dowdy–Ficklen Stadium; Greenville, NC	ABC/ESPN2	L 28–35	50,514
October 3	12:00 p.m.	Pittsburgh	Lane Stadium; Blacksburg, VA	ACCRSN	L 13–17	49,120
October 9	8:00 p.m.	NC State	Lane Stadium; Blacksburg, VA	ESPN	W 28–13	61,183
October 17	3:30 p.m.	at Miami (FL)	Sun Life Stadium; Miami Gardens, FL (rivalry)	ESPNU	L 20–30	50,787
October 24	3:30 p.m.	No. 23 Duke^{†}	Lane Stadium; Blacksburg, VA	ESPNU	L 43–45 ^{4OT}	63,257
October 31	12:30 p.m.	at Boston College	Alumni Stadium; Chestnut Hill, MA (rivalry)	ACCN	W 26–10	28,108
November 12	7:30 p.m.	at Georgia Tech	Bobby Dodd Stadium; Atlanta, GA (rivalry)	ESPN	W 23–21	48,522
November 21	12:00 p.m.	No. 12 North Carolina	Lane Stadium; Blacksburg, VA	ESPN	L 27–30 ^{OT}	65,632
November 28	12:00 p.m.	at Virginia	Scott Stadium; Charlottesville, VA (Commonwealth Cup)	ESPNU	W 23–20	53,777
December 26	5:45 p.m.	vs. Tulsa*	Independence Stadium; Shreveport, LA (Independence Bowl)	ESPN	W 55–52	31,289
*Non-conference game; ^{†}Homecoming; Rankings from AP Poll released prior to game; All times are in Eastern time

Schedule source:

== Game summaries ==
=== Ohio State ===
	1	2	3	4	Total
#1 Buckeyes	14	0	14	14	42
Hokies	0	17	0	7	24

=== Furman ===
	1	2	3	4	Total
Paladins	0	0	3	0	3
Hokies	7	7	21	7	42

=== At Purdue ===
	1	2	3	4	Total
Hokies	10	14	17	10	51
Boilermakers	7	10	0	7	24

=== East Carolina ===
	1	2	3	4	Total
Hokies	14	0	7	7	28
Pirates	14	7	14	0	35

=== Pittsburgh ===
	1	2	3	4	Total
Panthers	10	0	7	0	17
Hokies	0	7	3	3	13

=== NC State ===
	1	2	3	4	Total
Wolfpack	3	7	3	0	13
Hokies	0	21	0	7	28

=== At Miami (FL) ===
	1	2	3	4	Total
Hokies	10	3	0	7	20
Hurricanes	10	10	3	7	30

=== Duke ===
	1	2	3	4	OT	2OT	3OT	4OT	Total
#23 Blue Devils	14	0	7	3	3	7	3	8	45
Hokies	7	3	6	8	3	7	3	6	43

=== At Boston College ===
	1	2	3	4	Total
Hokies	10	10	3	3	26
Eagles	0	0	3	7	10

=== At Georgia Tech ===
	1	2	3	4	Total
Hokies	0	14	3	6	23
Yellow Jackets	14	0	7	0	21

=== North Carolina ===
	1	2	3	4	OT	Total
#12 Tar Heels	7	0	3	14	6	30
Hokies	0	3	7	14	3	27

=== At Virginia ===
	1	2	3	4	Total
Hokies	3	3	0	17	23
Cavaliers	3	3	7	7	20

=== Vs. Tulsa ===
	1	2	3	4	Total
Golden Hurricane	21	10	6	15	52
Hokies	24	21	7	3	55

== Roster ==
2015 Virginia Tech Hokies football team roster
Players
Coaches
Offense

Pos.	#	Name	Class
WR	1	Isaiah Ford	So
QB	2	Dwayne Lawson	Fr
RB	4	J.C. Coleman	Sr
WR	5	Cam Phillips	So
WR	6	Sean Daniel	Fr
TE	7	Bucky Hodges	RSo
QB	9	Brenden Motley	RJr
QB	12	Michael Brewer	RSr
QB	13	Chris Durkin	RFr
RB	14	Trey Edmunds	RJr
WR	15	Joel Caleb	RJr
QB	16	Jack Click	Fr
RB	16	Coleman Fox	Fr
WR	20	Deon Newsome	RSo
WR	21	Michael Brainard	RSr
WR	21	Alden Carpenter	RSo
FB	22	Trey Skeens	Fr
FB	25	Jerome Wright	Jr
RB	28	Shai McKenzie	So
FB	32	Steven Peoples	Fr
RB	33	Deshawn McClease	Fr
RB	34	Travon McMillian	RFr
WR	39	Jaylen Bradshaw	RFr
OL	41	Jack Willenbrock	RJr
RB	42	Marshawn Williams	So
FB	45	Sam Rogers	Jr
RB	48	D.J. Reid	RFr
OL	52	Darius Redman	RSr
OL	57	Wyatt Teller	RSo
OL	58	Colt Pettit	RFr
OL	61	Kyle Chung	RSo
OL	62	D'Andre Plantin	Fr
OL	63	Daniel Bailey	Fr
OL	63	Andrew Moras	RFr
OL	64	Eric Gallo	So
OL	65	Matt Christ	Fr
OL	66	Billy Ray Mitchell	RFr
OL	67	Parker Osterloh	RSo
OL	69	Yosuah Nijman	Fr
OL	71	Jonathan McLaughlin	Jr
OL	72	Augie Conte	RJr
OL	74	Braxton Pfaff	RFr
OL	75	Alston Smith	RJr
OL	76	Austin Clark	Fr
OL	77	Wade Hansen	RSr
OL	79	Tyrell Smith	Fr
WR	80	Demitri Knowles	RSr
WR	81	Kevin Asante	RSr
TE	82	Xavier Burke	Fr
WR	83	Charley Meyer	RJr
TE	85	Chris Cunningham	Fr
WR	86	C.J. Carroll	RFr
TE	86	Casey Harman	Fr
TE	88	Ryan Malleck	RSr
TE	89	Kalvin Cline	RSo
WR		Tyler Fitzgerald	RFr
OL		Connor Kish	Fr
OL		Kevin Kish	Fr
WR		Ryan Palmer	Fr

Defense

Pos.	#	Name	Class
FS	2	Donovan Riley	Sr
CB	3	Greg Stroman	So
DE	4	Ken Ekanem	RJr
CB	6	Mook Reynolds	Fr
LB	8	Zack Treser	Fr
CB	11	Kendall Fuller	Jr
CB	12	Erikk Banks	RSo
FS	17	Jahque Alleyne	Fr
CB	17	DuWayne Johnson	Fr
LB	18	Raymon Minor	RFr
DB	18	Tyrone Thornton	So
CB	19	Chuck Clark	Jr
S	22	Terrell Edmunds	RFr
FS	23	Der'Woun Greene	RJr
S	24	Anthony Shegog	RSo
CB	25	Elisha Boyd	RFr
FS	26	Desmond Frye	RJr
CB	27	Curtis Williams	RSo
FS	29	Greg Jones	RJr
OLB	30	Johnathan Galante	RSo
CB	31	Brandon Facyson	RSo
OLB	33	Quinton Taylor	RJr
S	36	Adonis Alexander	Fr
OLB	37	Ronny Vandyke	RSr
LB	38	Joe Koshuta	Fr
LB	38	Dahman McKinnon	RJr
LB	40	Deon Clarke	Sr
DE	41	Houshun Gaines	Fr
LB	42	Matt Reinhart	Fr
DE	43	Seth Dooley	RSo
LB	44	Carson Lydon	Fr
LB	45	Drew Burns	RJr
DE	47	Darius Fullwood	Fr
LB	48	Josh Eberly	RJr
LB	49	Tremaine Edmunds	Fr
LB	50	Jamieon Moss	RSo
DT	51	Harry Lewis	Fr
LB	53	Trent Young	RFr
LB	54	Andrew Motuapuaka	RSo
LB	56	Sean Huelskamp	RSo
DT	60	Woody Baron	Jr
DE	89	Laird Gardner	Sr
DT	89	Dalton Roe	RSo
DE	90	Dadi Lhomme Nicolas	RSr
DT	91	Steve Sobczak	RFr
DT	92	Luther Maddy	RSr
DE	93	Jeremy Haynes	RJr
DE	94	Trevon Hill	Fr
DT	95	Nigel Williams	RJr
DT	96	Corey Marshall	RSr
DT	97	Tim Settle	Fr
DT	98	Ricky Walker	So
DT	99	Vinny Mihota	RFr

Special teams

Pos.	#	Name	Class
P	27	A.J. Hughes	Sr
P	30	Mitchell Ludwig	Jr
PK	35	Michael Santamaria	RFr
LS	36	Wright Bynum	Fr
PK	46	Joey Slye	So
LS	59	Eddie D'Antuono	RJr
LS	87	Colton Taylor	RSo
PK	99	Jackson VanSickle	Fr

Head coach

- Frank Beamer

Coordinators/assistant coaches

- Shane Beamer – Associate Head Coach and Running Backs Coach
- Scot Loeffler – Offensive Coordinator and Quarterbacks Coach
- Bud Foster – Defensive Coordinator and Inside Linebackers Coach
- Bryan Stinespring – Recruiting Coordinator and Tight Ends Coach
- Stacy Searels – Offensive Line Coach
- Torrian Gray – Defensive Secondary Coach and Passing Game Coordinator
- Charley Wiles – Defensive Line Coach and Running Game Coordinator
- Cornell Brown – Outside Linebackers and Assistant Defensive Line Coach
- Zohn Burden – Wide Receivers Coach
- John Ballein – Associate Athletics Director for Football Operations
- Bruce Garnes – Deputy Director of Football Operations
- Chuck Cantor – Director of Player Personnel
- Thomas Guerry – Director of High School Relations

Legend

- (C) Team captain
- (S) Suspended
- (I) Ineligible
- Injured
- Redshirt

Roster
