= 2015 Duke Blue Devils football team =

American college football season

2015 Duke Blue Devils football

Pinstripe Bowl champion

Pinstripe Bowl, W 44–41 ^{OT} vs. Indiana
- Conference: Atlantic Coast Conference
- Coastal Division
- Record: 8–5 (4–4 ACC)
- Head coach: David Cutcliffe (8th season)
- Offensive coordinator: Scottie Montgomery (2nd season)
- Offensive scheme: Multiple
- Defensive coordinator: Jim Knowles (6th season)
- Base defense: 4–2–5
- MVP: Jeremy Cash
- Captains: Jeremy Cash; Matt Skura
- Home stadium: Wallace Wade Stadium

2015 Atlantic Coast Conference football standings
	Conf.			Overall
Team	W		L	W		L
Atlantic Division
No. 2 Clemson x$^	8	–	0	14	–	1
No. 14 Florida State	6	–	2	10	–	3
Louisville	5	–	3	8	–	5
NC State	3	–	5	7	–	6
Syracuse	2	–	6	4	–	8
Wake Forest	1	–	7	3	–	9
Boston College	0	–	8	3	–	9
Coastal Division
No. 15 North Carolina x	8	–	0	11	–	3
Pittsburgh	6	–	2	8	–	5
Miami (FL)	5	–	3	8	–	5
Duke	4	–	4	8	–	5
Virginia Tech	4	–	4	7	–	6
Virginia	3	–	5	4	–	8
Georgia Tech	1	–	7	3	–	9
Championship: Clemson 45, North Carolina 37
^ – College Football Playoff participant; $ – Conference champion; x – Division champion/co-champions; Rankings from AP Poll

The 2015 Duke Blue Devils football team represented Duke University in the 2015 NCAA Division I FBS football season as a member of the Atlantic Coast Conference (ACC) in the Coastal Division. The team was led by head coach David Cutcliffe, in his eighth year, and played its home games at the newly renovated Wallace Wade Stadium in Durham, North Carolina. They finished the season 8–5 overall and 4–4 in ACC play to tie for fourth place in the Coastal Division. They were invited to the Pinstripe Bowl, where they defeated Indiana, 44–41, in overtime.

== Schedule ==
Date	Time	Opponent	Rank	Site	TV	Result	Attendance
September 3	9:30 p.m.	at Tulane*		Yulman Stadium; New Orleans, LA	CBSSN	W 37–7	25,470
September 12	6:00 p.m.	North Carolina Central*		Wallace Wade Stadium; Durham, NC	ESPN3	W 55–0	33,941
September 19	12:30 p.m.	No. 23 Northwestern*		Wallace Wade Stadium; Durham, NC	ACCN	L 10–19	24,127
September 26	12:00 p.m.	No. 20 Georgia Tech		Wallace Wade Stadium; Durham, NC	ESPN2	W 34–20	20,101
October 3	3:30 p.m.	Boston College^{†}		Wallace Wade Stadium; Durham, NC	ACCRSN	W 9–7	20,009
October 10	12:00 p.m.	at Army*		Michie Stadium; West Point, NY	CBSSN	W 44–3	39,712
October 24	3:30 p.m.	at Virginia Tech	No. 23	Lane Stadium; Blacksburg, VA	ESPNU	W 45–43 ^{4OT}	63,257
October 31	7:00 p.m.	Miami (FL)	No. 22	Wallace Wade Stadium; Durham, NC	ESPNU	L 27–30	30,143
November 7	12:00 p.m.	at No. 21 North Carolina		Kenan Memorial Stadium; Chapel Hill, NC (Victory Bell)	ESPN2	L 31–66	60,500
November 14	12:00 p.m.	Pittsburgh		Wallace Wade Stadium; Durham, NC	ESPNews	L 13–31	30,241
November 21	3:30 p.m.	at Virginia		Scott Stadium; Charlottesville, VA	ESPN3	L 34–42	35,178
November 28	12:30 p.m.	at Wake Forest		BB&T Field; Winston-Salem, NC (rivalry)	ACCN	W 27–21	26,435
December 26	3:30 p.m.	vs. Indiana*		Yankee Stadium; Bronx, NY (Pinstripe Bowl)	ABC	W 44–41 ^{OT}	37,218
*Non-conference game; ^{†}Homecoming; Rankings from AP Poll released prior to the game; All times are in Eastern time

== Personnel ==
=== Roster ===
2015 Duke Blue Devils football team roster
Players
Coaches
Offense

Pos.	#	Name	Class
QB	1	Thomas Sirk	Jr
WR	3	T. J. Rahming	Fr
WR	10	Ryan Smith	Jr
QB	17	Daniel Jones	Fr
C	62	Matt Skura	Sr
G	67	Lucas Patrick	Sr
G	79	Tanner Stone	Jr
TE	80	David Reeves	Sr
TE	81	Davis Koppenhaver	So
WR	82	Chris Taylor	Fr
WR	83	Anthony Nash	Jr
TE	85	Dan Beilinson	Jr
WR	87	Max McCaffrey	Sr

Defense

Pos.	#	Name	Class
S	11	Gio Holmes-Garrido	Fr
S	20	Jake Kite	So
LB	24	Zavier Carmichael	So
S	26	Corbin McCarthy	Jr
DT	93	A. J. Wolf	Jr

Special teams

Pos.	#	Name	Class
LS	57	Thomas Hennessy	Jr

Head coach

- David Cutcliffe

Coordinators/assistant coaches

Legend

- (C) Team captain
- (S) Suspended
- (I) Ineligible
- Injured
- Redshirt

Roster

=== Coaching staff ===
Name	Position	Seasons at Duke	Alma mater
David Cutcliffe	Head Coach	8th	Alabama (1976)
Scottie Montgomery	Offensive coordinator/The Baxter Family Associate head coach/quarterbacks	3rd	Duke (1999)
John Latina	Offensive line/Assistant head coach/Running game coordinator	4th	Virginia Tech (1981)
Jim Knowles	Defensive coordinator	5th	Cornell (1987)
Jim Collins	Defensive ends	8th	Elon (1974)
Jeff Faris	Wide receivers	4th	Duke (2011)
Matt Guerrieri	Safeties	4th	Davidson College (2011)
Zac Roper	Special teams coordinator/Tight ends/recruiting coordinator	8th	Ole Miss (2001)
Derek Jones	Assistant Special Teams coordinator/Defensive Backs	8th	Ole Miss (1996)
Re'quan Boyette	Running backs	4th	Duke (2009)
Marcus Johnson	Offensive Quality Control	5th	Ole Miss (2004)
Patrick O'Connor	Defensive Quality Control	4th	Dickinson College (2010)
Josh Grizzard	Offensive Graduate Assistant	3rd	Yale University (2012)
Eli Keimach	Offensive Graduate Assistant	2nd	Massachusetts (2014)
Clayton McGrath	Defensive tackles/Graduate Assistant	3rd	Brown University (2011)
Sam McGrath	Defensive Graduate Assistant	1st	Brown University (2012)

== Game summaries ==
=== At Tulane ===
	1	2	3	4	Total
Blue Devils	3	10	3	21	37
Green Wave	0	0	0	7	7

=== North Carolina Central ===
	1	2	3	4	Total
Eagles	0	0	0	0	0
Blue Devils	7	17	17	14	55

=== No. 23 Northwestern ===
	1	2	3	4	Total
No. 23 Wildcats	0	3	9	7	19
Blue Devils	7	0	0	3	10

=== No. 20 Georgia Tech ===
	1	2	3	4	Total
No. 20 Yellow Jackets	3	7	3	7	20
Blue Devils	19	0	7	8	34

=== Boston College ===
	1	2	3	4	Total
Eagles	0	0	7	0	7
Blue Devils	3	6	0	0	9

=== At Army ===
	1	2	3	4	Total
Blue Devils	10	17	3	14	44
Black Knights	0	0	3	0	3

=== At Virginia Tech ===
	1	2	3	4	OT	2OT	3OT	4OT	Total
No. 23 Blue Devils	14	0	7	3	3	7	3	8	45
Hokies	7	3	6	8	3	7	3	6	43

=== Miami (FL) ===
	1	2	3	4	Total
Hurricanes	0	14	0	16	30
No. 22 Blue Devils	0	3	9	15	27

This game is best remembered for the finish, in which Miami used eight laterals to return the kickoff with no time left and get the win. However, photographic evidence later proved that one of the laterals was still in the Miami player's hand as his knee was down, which if caught by the referees would have ended the play and kept Duke the winners. The ACC apologized to Duke and suspended the officials from this game.

=== At No. 21 North Carolina ===
	1	2	3	4	Total
Blue Devils	3	7	14	7	31
No. 21 Tar Heels	21	17	21	7	66

=== Pittsburgh ===
	1	2	3	4	Total
Panthers	7	3	14	7	31
Blue Devils	7	3	3	0	13

=== At Virginia ===
	1	2	3	4	Total
Blue Devils	7	6	7	14	34
Cavaliers	21	7	14	0	42

=== At Wake Forest ===
	1	2	3	4	Total
Blue Devils	7	10	7	3	27
Demon Deacons	7	0	0	14	21

=== Vs. Indiana (Pinstripe Bowl) ===
	1	2	3	4	OT	Total
Hoosiers	0	17	14	10	0	41
Blue Devils	10	7	10	14	3	44

== Rankings ==
Ranking movements Legend: ██ Increase in ranking ██ Decrease in ranking — = Not ranked RV = Received votes
	Week															
Poll	Pre	1	2	3	4	5	6	7	8	9	10	11	12	13	14	Final
AP	—	—	RV	—	RV	RV	25	23	22	RV	—	—	—	—	—	RV
Coaches	RV	RV	RV	—	RV	RV	24	21	18	RV	—	—	—	—	—	RV
CFP	Not released									—	—	—	—	—	—	Not released
