= 2015 Boston College Eagles football team =

American college football season

2015 Boston College Eagles football
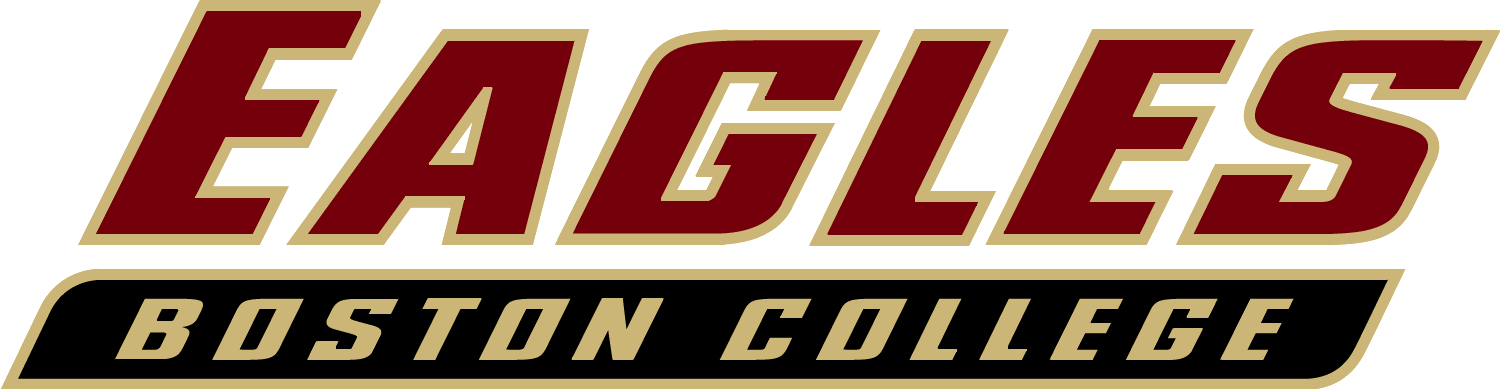
- Conference: Atlantic Coast Conference
- Atlantic Division
- Record: 3–9 (0–8 ACC)
- Head coach: Steve Addazio (3rd season)
- Offensive coordinator: Todd Fitch (1st season)
- Offensive scheme: Multiple
- Defensive coordinator: Don Brown (3rd season)
- Base defense: 4–3
- Captain: Game captains
- Home stadium: Alumni Stadium

2015 Atlantic Coast Conference football standings
	Conf.			Overall
Team	W		L	W		L
Atlantic Division
No. 2 Clemson x$^	8	–	0	14	–	1
No. 14 Florida State	6	–	2	10	–	3
Louisville	5	–	3	8	–	5
NC State	3	–	5	7	–	6
Syracuse	2	–	6	4	–	8
Wake Forest	1	–	7	3	–	9
Boston College	0	–	8	3	–	9
Coastal Division
No. 15 North Carolina x	8	–	0	11	–	3
Pittsburgh	6	–	2	8	–	5
Miami (FL)	5	–	3	8	–	5
Duke	4	–	4	8	–	5
Virginia Tech	4	–	4	7	–	6
Virginia	3	–	5	4	–	8
Georgia Tech	1	–	7	3	–	9
Championship: Clemson 45, North Carolina 37
^ – College Football Playoff participant; $ – Conference champion; x – Division champion/co-champions; Rankings from AP Poll

The 2015 Boston College Eagles football team represented Boston College as a member of the Atlantic Division of the Atlantic Coast Conference in the 2015 NCAA Division I FBS football season. They were led by third-year head coach Steve Addazio and played their home games at Alumni Stadium. They finished the season 3–9 overall and 0–8 in ACC play to place last of six teams in the Atlantic Division.

== Schedule ==
Date	Time	Opponent	Site	TV	Result	Attendance
September 5	1:00 p.m.	Maine*	Alumni Stadium; Chestnut Hill, MA	ESPN3	W 24–3	29,626
September 12	1:00 p.m.	Howard*	Alumni Stadium; Chestnut Hill, MA	ESPN3	W 76–0	26,132
September 18	8:00 p.m.	No. 9 Florida State	Alumni Stadium; Chestnut Hill, MA	ESPN	L 0–14	39,111
September 26	1:00 p.m.	Northern Illinois*	Alumni Stadium; Chestnut Hill, MA	ESPN3	W 17–14	30,193
October 3	3:30 p.m.	at Duke	Wallace Wade Stadium; Durham, NC	ACCRSN	L 7–9	20,009
October 10	3:00 p.m.	Wake Forest^{†}	Alumni Stadium; Chestnut Hill, MA	ACCRSN	L 0–3	30,094
October 17	7:00 p.m.	at No. 5 Clemson	Memorial Stadium; Clemson, SC (O'Rourke–McFadden Trophy)	ESPNU	L 17–34	81,416
October 24	12:30 p.m.	at Louisville	Papa John's Cardinal Stadium; Louisville, KY	ACCN	L 14–17	41,486
October 31	12:30 p.m.	Virginia Tech^{†}	Alumni Stadium; Chestnut Hill, MA (rivalry)	ACCN	L 10–26	28,108
November 7	12:30 p.m.	NC State	Alumni Stadium; Chestnut Hill, MA	ACCN	L 8–24	28,533
November 21	7:30 p.m.	vs. No. 5 Notre Dame*	Fenway Park; Boston, MA (Shamrock Series, Holy War)	NBCSN	L 16–19	38,686
November 28	12:30 p.m.	at Syracuse	Carrier Dome; Syracuse, NY	ACCRSN	L 17–20	30,317
*Non-conference game; ^{†}Homecoming; Rankings from AP Poll released prior to the game; All times are in Eastern time

== Game summaries ==
=== Maine ===
	1	2	3	4	Total
Black Bears	3	0	0	0	3
Eagles	0	10	0	14	24

The Eagles won their third season opener in a row against regional rival FCS Maine. While the Eagles offense struggled to find their footing under the new leadership of sophomore quarterback Darius Wade, the defense was stifling, holding the Black Bears to 91 total yards on offense, and only 7 yards rushing. Maine opened up the scoring with a field goal on their opening drive, but that would be all they could muster for the entirety of the game. Wade managed to incorporate a passing attack that complemented the Eagles' now well-known running game, throwing 14/25 and 155 yards, including a touchdown pass to Bobby Swigert, who returned to the field after a two season-long injury. Sophomore power back Jonathan Hillman struggled to put up yards, only rushing for 47 yards on 16 carries, but Junior Tyler Rouse picked up the slack, ripping off two fourth quarter touchdown runs, totaling 81 yards on 8 carries, including a 45-yard rush for a score.

=== Howard ===
	1	2	3	4	Total
Bison	0	0	0	0	0
Eagles	41	21	7	7	76

The Eagles trampled over an outmatched Howard team in their second game of the season, scoring 41 first quarter points and 62 points in the first half, the most by any FBS team in the last ten seasons. After the first half concluded, the two teams agreed, per NCAA rules, to shorten the second half of play by 10:00 minutes. After Tyler Rouse scored his third rushing touchdown (just 11:00 into the game), the Eagles starters were able to take an early rest, letting backups and freshman showcase their talents for the rest of the game. Quarterbacks Jeff Smith and Troy Flutie both took snaps, with Smith rushing for 89 yards and 3 scores on 5 carries and Flutie throwing 7/8 for 88 yards and a TD. The Eagles defense held the Bison to just 11 total yards of offense, only becoming a positive number until late in the game.

=== Florida State ===
	1	2	3	4	Total
#9 Seminoles	7	0	0	7	14
Eagles	0	0	0	0	0

Boston College's hopes of an upset on an emotional "Red Bandana" night, honoring alum and 9/11 hero Welles Crowther, were defeated as the Seminoles stuffed the Eagles 14–0 in an extremely tight defensive contest. After former Notre Dame QB Everett Golson led a drive for a touchdown after the game's opening kickoff, neither team would put up any points offensively during the rest of the entire game; the Noles would pad their 7–0 lead in the 4th quarter with a touchdown off a fumble recovery. The Eagles produced a tremendous defensive performance against the #9 ranked Seminoles, allowing only 217 total yards of offense and holding running back Dalvin Cook to 54 yards rushing. This effort was in vain, though, as BC's offense struggled to start drives and move the ball down the field; only passing midfield three times. Starting QB Darius Wade left the game in the 4th quarter with an injury, and for the second week in a row, both backups Jeff Smith and Troy Flutie took snaps to finish off the contest. The win was the 6th in a row for the Seminoles in the series.

=== Northern Illinois ===
	1	2	3	4	Total
Huskies	0	7	0	7	14
Eagles	0	7	7	3	17

In the second ever matchup between the two schools, the Eagles and Huskies struggled through a close defensive battle, which is quickly becoming a trend for the season as the BC defense continues to lead the FBS in total yards allowed. After trading punts throughout the 1st quarter, the Eagles broke through with the first score of the game, when Troy Flutie, who started in lieu of Darius Wade after suffering a broken ankle in the previous week against FSU, threw a 27-yard touchdown to Charlie Callinan. The Huskies would answer back with a rushing score shortly before the end of the half, set up by a long interception return to the 4 yard line. The Eagles would take the lead again with a 21-yard rushing score by Jonathan Hilliman in the 3rd. It seemed all but over after BC tacked on a field goal late in the 4th to make it a 17–7 game, however, the Huskies would make it interesting, returning the ensuing kickoff for a touchdown to come within 3 points. After forcing a 3-and-out, NIU got the ball back with 2:20 on the clock, but failed to convert on a 4-and-10, sealing the victory for Boston College. Hilliman lead the way for the Eagles, rushing for 119 yards and a score on the day. Flutie went 5 for 11, throwing 92 yards and a score, and Jeff Smith, who also took snaps with Wade out, ran for 56 yards on 9 attempts. The Eagles defense remained stellar, holding the Huskies to just 153 yards of offense for the game.

=== @ Duke ===
	1	2	3	4	Total
Eagles	0	0	7	0	7
Blue Devils	3	6	0	0	9

In yet another defensive showdown between two top defensive teams in the nation, BC was edged out by Duke in a low scoring 9–7 contest. It was a tale of two halves, as Duke scored 3 field goals in the first half but did not score in the 2nd, and as BC scored a touchdown in the second half, after having been shut out of the first. The Eagles missed two field goal attempts during the game (the first on a muffed snap and the other on a shanked kick), which proved to be pivotal points lost. On the flip side, Duke lost potential points after failing to pound the ball in the end zone on a short fourth-and-1 from the goal-line. Both freshman quarterbacks shared snaps again, with Jeff Smith making the start. After Smith failed to complete a pass during the entire first half and struggled to move the ball down the field, the switch was made to Flutie, who completed 5 of 8 passes for 129 yards, one of which was the game's only touchdown, a 66-yard score to Thadd Smith. The team combined for 164 yards rushing. The Eagle's defense was stifling, allowing just 33 yards rushing on 35 attempts, less than a yard per carry average. They also held the Blue Devils to just 74 yards of offense in the second half, giving the Eagles plenty of opportunity, in vain, to take the lead late in the game.

=== Wake Forest ===
	1	2	3	4	Total
Demon Deacons	0	0	3	0	3
Eagles	0	0	0	0	0

=== @ Clemson ===
	1	2	3	4	Total
Eagles	7	3	0	7	17
Tigers	10	7	10	7	34

=== @ Louisville ===
	1	2	3	4	Total
Eagles	0	7	7	0	14
Cardinals	7	10	0	0	17

=== Virginia Tech ===
	1	2	3	4	Total
Hokies	10	10	3	3	26
Eagles	0	0	3	7	10

=== NC State ===
	1	2	3	4	Total
Wolfpack	0	14	7	3	24
Eagles	0	0	0	8	8

=== Notre Dame ===
	1	2	3	4	Total
Fighting Irish	10	0	6	3	19
Eagles	0	0	3	13	16

=== @ Syracuse ===
	1	2	3	4	Total
Eagles	7	0	7	3	17
Orange	0	10	7	3	20

== Personnel ==
=== Coaching staff ===
Name	Position	Seasons at Boston College	Alma mater
Steve Addazio	Head Coach	2	Central Connecticut State (1982)
Todd Fitch	Offensive Coordinator/quarterbacks	2	Ohio Wesleyan (1986)
Justin Frye	Offensive line	2	Indiana (2006)
Frank Leonard	Tight ends	2	Central Connecticut State (1981)
Al Washington	Running backs	3	Boston College (2006)
Brian White	Wide receivers	1	Harvard (1986)
Don Brown	Defensive coordinator/linebackers	2	Norwich (1977)
Ben Albert	Defensive line	3	UMass (1995)
Kevin Lempa	Defensive Backs	16	Southern Connecticut State (1974)
Coleman Hutzler	Special teams coordinator	0	Middlebury College (2006)

== 2016 NFL draft ==
2016	3	35	98	Justin Simmons	Denver Broncos	DB
2016	7	11	232	Steven Daniels	Washington Redskins	LB
