= 2015 ACC Championship Game =

2015 Dr Pepper ACC Championship Game
North Carolina Tar Heels	Clemson Tigers
(11–1)	(12–0)
37	45
Head coach: Larry Fedora	Head coach: Dabo Swinney
AP / Coaches / CFP; 8 / 8 / 10	AP / Coaches / CFP; 1 / 1 / 1
	1	2	3	4	Total
North Carolina	9	7	7	14	37
Clemson	7	14	14	10	45
- Date: December 5, 2015
- Season: 2015
- Stadium: Bank of America Stadium
- Location: Charlotte, North Carolina
- MVP: QB Deshaun Watson (Clemson)
- Favorite: Clemson by 6.5
- Referee: Jeff Heaser
- Halftime show: North Carolina And Clemson Marching Bands
- Attendance: 74,514

United States TV coverage
- Network: ABC
- Announcers: Chris Fowler (play-by-play); Kirk Herbstreit (color); Heather Cox (sidelines); Tom Rinaldi (sidelines)
- Nielsen ratings: 2.4/9

2015 Atlantic Coast Conference football standings
	Conf.			Overall
Team	W		L	W		L
Atlantic Division
No. 2 Clemson x$^	8	–	0	14	–	1
No. 14 Florida State	6	–	2	10	–	3
Louisville	5	–	3	8	–	5
NC State	3	–	5	7	–	6
Syracuse	2	–	6	4	–	8
Wake Forest	1	–	7	3	–	9
Boston College	0	–	8	3	–	9
Coastal Division
No. 15 North Carolina x	8	–	0	11	–	3
Pittsburgh	6	–	2	8	–	5
Miami (FL)	5	–	3	8	–	5
Duke	4	–	4	8	–	5
Virginia Tech	4	–	4	7	–	6
Virginia	3	–	5	4	–	8
Georgia Tech	1	–	7	3	–	9
Championship: Clemson 45, North Carolina 37
^ – College Football Playoff participant; $ – Conference champion; x – Division champion/co-champions; Rankings from AP Poll

The 2015 Dr Pepper ACC Championship Game was the eleventh football championship game for the Atlantic Coast Conference. It featured the Clemson Tigers, winners of the ACC's Atlantic Division, and the North Carolina Tar Heels, the winners of the ACC's Coastal Division. It was the first time in ACC championship game history in which both participating teams were undefeated in conference play. This was the game's sixth consecutive year at Bank of America Stadium in Charlotte, North Carolina. The game had a controversial finish when North Carolina recovered an onside kick with a chance to tie the game late in the fourth quarter, but a phantom offsides call forced a rekick which Clemson recovered.

== Teams ==
=== Atlantic Division champions ===
The Clemson Tigers went into the game as the consensus #1 team in the nation after clinching the ACC Atlantic Division title against the Florida State Seminoles on November 7, 2015.

=== Coastal Division champions ===
The Tar Heels entered the game ranked #8 in the AP poll and #10 in the CFP poll, having clinched the ACC Coastal Division against Virginia Tech on November 21, 2015.

== Pre-game buildup ==
=== Ticket Sales ===
The 2015 ACC Championship Game marks the third time in the game's history in which the game was considered a sell-out. A record 74,514 tickets were sold for the game. Previous sell-out years were 2010 and 2011. The high number of tickets sold were attributed to the fact that the championship game site was a relatively close distance for both participating schools (and thus a large portion of their fan bases), as well as having two highly ranked teams (Clemson at #1 and UNC at #8) with a single loss between them. The previous three years' games saw large tarps covering parts of the upper deck due to the lack of tickets sold.

=== Playoff Implications ===
Much of the debate around the ACC Championship Game involved scenarios of what would happen in the event the Tar Heels upset the undefeated Tigers. It was assumed that, should Clemson win the game, they would be the top seed in the College Football Playoff, given that they were already ranked #1 by the selection committee going into the game. However, had Clemson lost the game, there were several hypotheses about who the selection committee would select as the top 4 teams to participate in the playoff.

One theory was that if North Carolina were to win the ACC championship, they should be included in the playoff because they only had a single loss on the season (something that others vying for a spot also had) and would have beaten the consensus #1 team in the country at a neutral site. Alternatively, others argued that North Carolina didn't deserve to be in the playoff because of their current rank (#10) in the selection committee poll as well as their relatively weak schedule.

Another theory stated that even with a loss in the ACC Championship Game, Clemson should still be in the playoff. Proponents of this theory argued that Clemson had been widely considered the best team in the country during the latter part of the regular season, and had quality wins against Notre Dame and Florida State. A loss in the championship game would be viewed as a "quality" loss to a top 10 opponent, and a better loss than other one-loss teams in consideration, including North Carolina.

Another possibility was that a loss by Clemson would leave the ACC shut out of the playoff altogether, and either Ohio State or Stanford would take the 4th playoff spot.

Whatever the case, the winner of the championship game would have been guaranteed no worse than a berth in the 2015 Peach Bowl, which hosted the ACC champion if that team was not selected for the College Football Playoff. Had the Tar Heels won that game, it would have been their first appearance in a major bowl since the 1950 Cotton Bowl Classic. Some argue that since Clemson was selected for the Playoff, North Carolina should have gotten the bid to the Peach Bowl instead of Florida State because they had a better record than the Seminoles (11-2 vs. 10-2) and actually went undefeated in conference play with an 8-0 record (Florida State was 6-2 in ACC play with road losses to Georgia Tech and Clemson); neither North Carolina nor Florida State would win their respective bowl games.

== Scoring summary ==
1st quarter scoring:

- UNC – FG 08:45 Nick Weiler 30 Yd Field Goal
- CLEM – TD 05:14 Wayne Gallman 16 Yd pass from Deshaun Watson (Ammon Lakip Kick)
- UNC – TD 01:44 T. J. Logan 46 Yd pass from Marquise Williams (Two-Point Pass Conversion Failed)

2nd quarter scoring:

- CLEM – TD 10:35 Deshaun Watson 9 Yd Run (Ammon Lakip Kick)
- UNC – TD 03:52 Ryan Switzer 3 Yd pass from Marquise Williams (Nick Weiler Kick)
- CLEM – TD 00:02 Jordan Leggett 1 Yd pass from Deshaun Watson (Ammon Lakip Kick)

3rd quarter scoring:

- CLEM – TD 07:55 Wayne Gallman 3 Yd Run (Ammon Lakip Kick)
- CLEM – TD 04:58 Artavis Scott 35 Yd pass from Deshaun Watson (Ammon Lakip Kick)
- UNC – TD 01:39 Marquise Williams 1 Yd Run (Nick Weiler Kick)

4th quarter scoring:

- CLEM – TD 11:34 Deshaun Watson 2 Yd Run (Ammon Lakip Kick)
- UNC – TD 09:54 Elijah Hood 2 Yd Run (Nick Weiler Kick)
- CLEM – FG 02:14 Greg Huegel 27 Yd Field Goal
- UNC – TD 01:13 Ryan Switzer 17 Yd pass from Marquise Williams (Nick Weiler Kick)

=== Statistics ===
Statistics	UNC	CU
First downs	21	33
Total yards	382	608
Rushes-yards (net)	32–142	56–319
Passing yards (net)	240	289
Passes, Comp-Att-Int	12–35–1	26–42–1
Time of Possession	21:04	38:56
