= Alex Bachman =

American football player (born 1996)

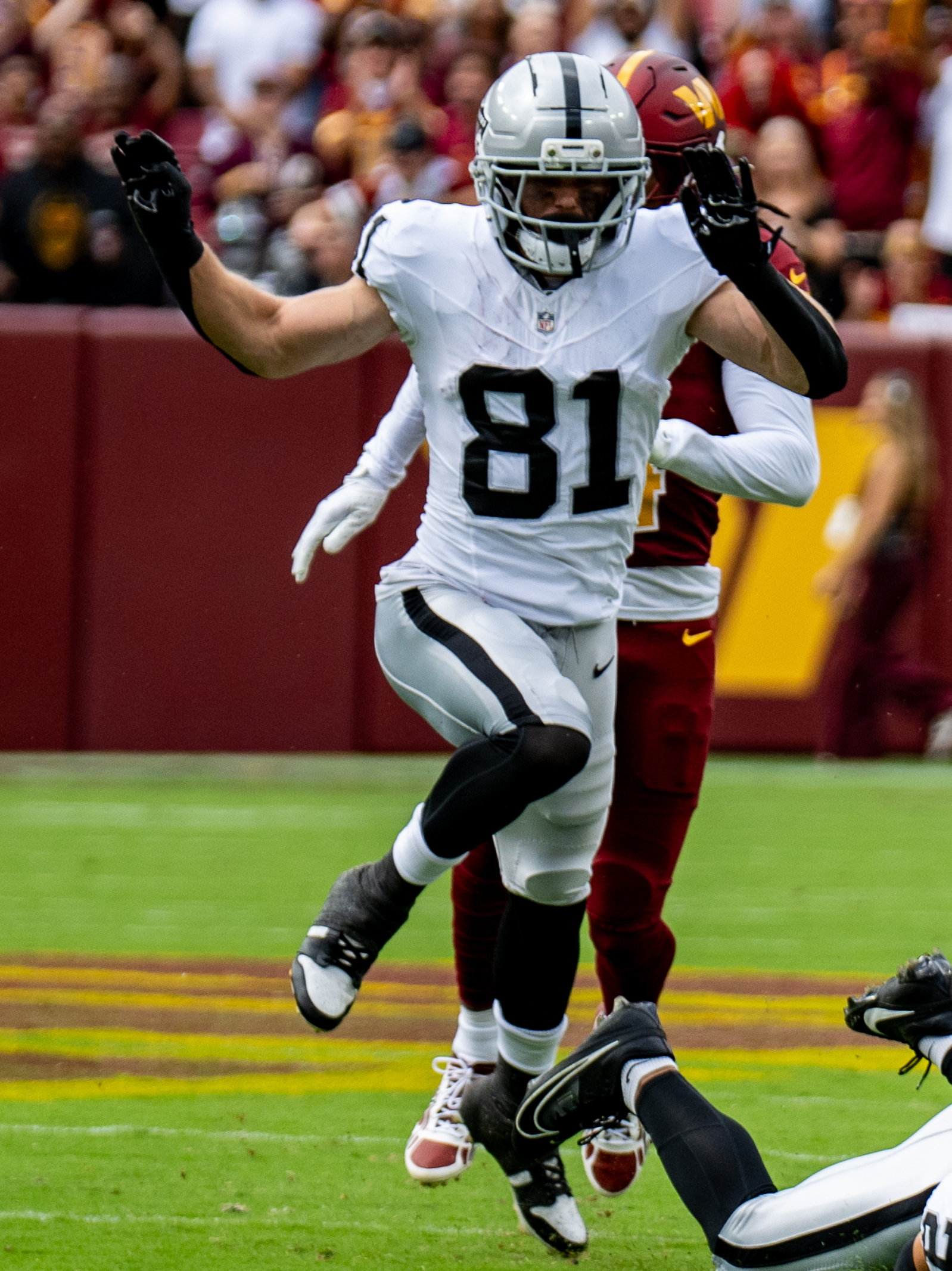
- Bachman with the Las Vegas Raiders in 2025

No. 11 – Los Angeles Rams
- Positions: Wide receiver, punt returner
- Roster status: Practice squad

Personal information
- Born: May 29, 1996 (age 30); Westlake Village, California, U.S.
- Listed height: 6 ft 0 in (1.83 m)
- Listed weight: 190 lb (86 kg)

Career information
- High school: Oaks Christian (Westlake Village)
- College: Wake Forest (2015–2018)
- NFL draft: 2019: undrafted

Career history
- Los Angeles Rams (2019)*; New York Giants (2019–2021); Houston Texans (2022–2023)*; Las Vegas Raiders (2024–2025); Los Angeles Rams (2026–present)
- * Offseason or practice squad member only

Career NFL statistics as of Week 8, 2026
- Receptions: 5
- Receiving yards: 43
- Return yards: 579
- Stats at Pro Football Reference

Alex Bachman (born May 29, 1996) is an American professional football wide receiver and punt returner for the Los Angeles Rams of the National Football League (NFL). He played college football for the Wake Forest Demon Deacons.

== College career ==
Bachman was a member of the Wake Forest Demon Deacons for four seasons. As a senior, he caught 37 passes for 541 yards and six touchdowns. Bachman finished his collegiate career with 82 receptions for 1,162 yards and ten touchdowns in 32 games played.

== Professional career ==
Pre-draft measurables
| Height | Weight | Arm length | Hand span | Wingspan | 40-yard dash | 10-yard split | 20-yard split | 20-yard shuttle | Three-cone drill | Vertical jump | Broad jump | Bench press |
|---|---|---|---|---|---|---|---|---|---|---|---|---|
| 5 ft 11 3/8 in (1.81 m) | 195 lb (88 kg) | 30 7/8 in (0.78 m) | 9 1/2 in (0.24 m) | 6 ft 1 7/8 in (1.88 m) | 4.47 s | 1.58 s | 2.63 s | 4.28 s | 6.71 s | 33.0 in (0.84 m) | 10 ft 7 in (3.23 m) | 17 reps |
All values from Pro Day

=== Los Angeles Rams ===
Bachman was signed by the Los Angeles Rams as an undrafted free agent on April 29, 2019. He was waived/injured during final roster cuts on August 31, and reverted to injured reserve the next day. Bachman was waived by the Rams with an injury settlement on September 5.

=== New York Giants ===
Bachman was signed to the New York Giants practice squad on November 12, 2019. He signed a reserve/futures contract with the team on December 30.

Bachman was waived during final roster cuts on September 5, 2020, and signed to the practice squad the next day. He was released on September 15, but he was re-signed to the practice squad on October 5. Bachman was elevated to the active roster on October 22 and made his NFL debut on that night in a 22–21 loss to the Philadelphia Eagles. He reverted to the practice squad after the game on October 23.

Bachman signed a reserve/future contract on January 4, 2021. He was placed on injured reserve on August 31, and shortly released. On November 3, Bachman was signed to the Giants' practice squad. On December 18, Bachman was activated from the practice squad as a COVID-19 replacement for the game against the Dallas Cowboys. He signed a reserve/future contract with the Giants on January 11, 2022.

On August 30, 2022, Bachman was waived by the Giants.

=== Houston Texans ===
On November 15, 2022, Bachman signed with the practice squad of the Houston Texans. He signed a reserve/future contract with Houston on January 10, 2023. Bachman was waived on August 22. He was re-signed to the practice squad on November 8. Bachman signed a reserve/future contract with the Texans on January 22, 2024. He was waived by Houston on April 9.

=== Las Vegas Raiders ===
On May 22, 2024, Bachman signed with the Las Vegas Raiders. He was waived on August 27, and re-signed to the practice squad. He was promoted to the active roster on October 19. Bachman was waived by the Raiders on November 16, and re-signed to the practice squad. He signed a reserve/future contract with the Raiders on January 23, 2025.

On August 26, 2025, Bachman was released by the Raiders as part of final roster cuts and re-signed to the practice squad the next day. He was signed to the active roster on October 3.

=== Los Angeles Rams (second stint) ===
On August 18, 2026, Bachman signed with the Los Angeles Rams. On August 30, he was released by Los Angeles as a part of final roster cuts; he was re-signed to the team's practice squad the following day. On October 2, he was promoted to the active roster. He made his debut with the Rams in Week 4, returning four punts for 30 yards and four kickoffs for 89 yards in L.A.'s 24-20 victory at Philadelphia. On November 3, Bachman was released and was re-signed to the practice squad the next day.

== NFL career statistics ==
Legend
| **Bold** | Career high |

=== Regular season ===
| Year | Team | Games | | Receiving | | | | | Rushing | | | | | Punt returns | | | | | Kick returns | | | | | Fumbles | | | Tackles | | |
| Year | Team | GP | GS | Rec | Yds | Avg | Lng | TD | Att | Yds | Avg | Lng | TD | Ret | Yds | Avg | Lng | TD | Ret | Yds | Avg | Lng | TD | Fum | Lost | FR | Cmb | Solo | Ast |
|---|---|---|---|---|---|---|---|---|---|---|---|---|---|---|---|---|---|---|---|---|---|---|---|---|---|---|---|---|---|
| 2020 | NYG | 1 | 0 | 0 | 0 | 0.0 | 0 | 0 | 0 | 0 | 0.0 | 0 | 0 | 0 | 0 | 0.0 | 0 | 0 | 0 | 0 | 0.0 | 0 | 0 | 0 | 0 | 0 | 0 | 0 | 0 |
| 2021 | NYG | 3 | 0 | 0 | 0 | 0.0 | 0 | 0 | **1** | **-3** | **-3.0** | **-3** | 0 | 1 | 16 | **16.0** | 16 | 0 | **4** | **94** | **23.5** | **27** | 0 | 0 | 0 | 0 | 1 | 1 | 0 |
| 2024 | LV | 6 | **1** | **3** | **31** | **10.3** | **18** | 0 | 0 | 0 | 0.0 | 0 | 0 | 0 | 0 | 0.0 | 0 | 0 | 0 | 0 | 0.0 | 0 | 0 | 0 | 0 | 0 | **3** | **3** | 0 |
| 2025 | LV | **13** | 0 | 2 | 12 | 6.0 | 9 | 0 | 0 | 0 | 0.0 | 0 | 0 | **22** | **124** | 5.6 | **25** | 0 | 0 | 0 | 0.0 | 0 | 0 | **1** | 0 | **1** | **3** | 0 | **3** |
| 2026 | LAR | 1 | 0 | 0 | 0 | 0.0 | 0 | 0 | 0 | 0 | 0.0 | 0 | 0 | 4 | 30 | 7.5 | 15 | 0 | **4** | 89 | 22.3 | 24 | 0 | 0 | 0 | 0 | 0 | 0 | 0 |
| Career | | 24 | 1 | 5 | 43 | 8.6 | 18 | 0 | 1 | -3 | -3.0 | -3 | 0 | 27 | 170 | 6.3 | 25 | 0 | 8 | 183 | 22.9 | 27 | 0 | 1 | 0 | 1 | 7 | 4 | 3 |
