= 2013 Miami Hurricanes football team =

American college football season

2013 Miami Hurricanes football

Russell Athletic Bowl, L 9–36 vs. Louisville
- Conference: Atlantic Coast Conference
- Coastal Division
- Record: 9–4 (5–3 ACC)
- Head coach: Al Golden (3rd season)
- Offensive coordinator: James Coley (1st season)
- Offensive scheme: Pro-style
- Defensive coordinator: Mark D'Onofrio (3rd season)
- Base defense: 4–3
- Home stadium: Sun Life Stadium

2013 Atlantic Coast Conference football standings
	Conf.			Overall
Team	W		L	W		L
Atlantic Division
No. 1 Florida State x$#	8	–	0	14	–	0
No. 8 Clemson %	7	–	1	11	–	2
Boston College	4	–	4	7	–	6
Syracuse	4	–	4	7	–	6
Maryland	3	–	5	7	–	6
Wake Forest	2	–	6	4	–	8
NC State	0	–	8	3	–	9
Coastal Division
No. 23 Duke x	6	–	2	10	–	4
Miami (FL)	5	–	3	9	–	4
Virginia Tech	5	–	3	8	–	5
Georgia Tech	5	–	3	7	–	6
North Carolina	4	–	4	7	–	6
Pittsburgh	3	–	5	7	–	6
Virginia	0	–	8	2	–	10
Championship: Florida State 45, Duke 7
# – BCS National Champion; $ – BCS representative as conference champion; % – BCS at-large representative; x – Division champion/co-champions; Rankings from AP Poll

The 2013 Miami Hurricanes football team represented the University of Miami during the 2013 NCAA Division I FBS football season. It was the Hurricanes' 88th season of football and 10th as a member of the Atlantic Coast Conference. The Hurricanes were led by third-year head coach Al Golden and played their home games at Sun Life Stadium. They finished the season 9–4 overall and 5–3 in the ACC to finish in a three-way tie for second place in the Coastal Division. They were invited to the Russell Athletic Bowl where they lost to Louisville 36–9.

== Personnel ==
=== Coaching staff ===
Name	Position	Seasons	Alma mater
Al Golden	Head coach	3	Penn State (1991)
Mark D'Onofrio	Assistant head coach/defensive coordinator	3	Penn State (1991)
James Coley	Offensive coordinator/quarterbacks	1	Florida State (1997)
Jethro Franklin	Senior defensive assistant/defensive line	3	Fresno State (1989)
Art Kehoe	Offensive line	29	Miami (1982)
Micheal Barrow	Linebackers	7	Miami (1992)
Hurlie Brown	Running backs/Florida recruiting coordinator	1	Miami (1992)
Larry Scott	Tight ends	1	South Florida (2000)
Paul Williams	Defensive backs	3	Delaware (1996)
Brennan Carroll	Wide receivers/National recruiting coordinator	3	Pittsburgh (2001)

=== Support staff ===
Name	Position	Seasons	Alma mater
Andreu Swasey	Strength and Conditioning		
Kareem Brown	Graduate assistant	1	
Derron Montgomery	Graduate assistant	1	
Chris O'Hara	Graduate assistant	1	
Cole Pemberton	Graduate assistant	1	

=== Roster ===
2013 Miami Hurricanes football team roster
Players
Coaches
Offense

Pos.	#	Name	Class
WR	18	Chad Barnes	Sr
OL	79	Malcolm Bunche	Jr
RB	23	Eduardo Clements	Sr
TE	82	Asante Cleveland	Sr
WR	3	Stacy Coley	Fr
RB	25	Dallas Crawford	So
QB	13	Gray Crow	Fr
QB	12	Preston Dewey (injured)	Fr
TE	5	Standish Dobard	Fr
WR	4	Phillip Dorsett	Jr
WR	83	John D'Uva	So
CB	7	Henry Weisman	Fr
G	70	Jon Feliciano	Jr
OT	74	Ereck Flowers	So
OT	76	Taylor Gadbois	Fr
G	67	Alex Gall	Fr
WR	84	Greg Golden	Fr
FB	33	Maurice Hagans	Sr
OL	73	Sean Harvey	Jr
OT	77	Seantrel Henderson	Sr
QB	15	Isaac Hoza	Fr
WR	1	Allen Hurns	Sr
G	63	Danny Isidora	Fr
RB	47	De'Andre Johnson	Jr
RB	8	Duke Johnson (injured)	So
WR	21	Josh Johnson	Fr
WR	15	D'Mauri Jones	Fr
WR	87	Garrett Kidd	So
C/OG	54	Hunter Knighton (injured)	Fr
RB	27	Jameson Labady	Sr
QB	16	Garrison Lassiter	Fr
WR	9	Malcolm Lewis	So
G	65	Brandon Linder	Sr
WR	31	Malik Mayweather	Fr
C	62	Shane McDermott	Jr
WR	26	Joey McNeill	Jr
QB	17	Stephen Morris	Sr
OT	66	Sunny Odogwu	Fr
TE	88	Jake O'Donnell	Fr
QB	19	Kevin Olsen	Fr
TE	85	Beau Sandland	Jr
WR	80	Rashawn Scott	Jr
WR	28	Stephen Sweeney	So
FB	44	Walter Tucker	Fr
TE	46	Clive Walford	Jr
WR	6	Herb Waters	So
QB	2	Michael Welch	Fr
G	64	Hunter Wells	So
C	75	Jared Wheeler	Sr
QB	11	Ryan Williams	Jr

Defense

Pos.	#	Name	Class
OLB	34	Thurston Armbrister	So
ILB	54	JaWand Blue	Fr
CB	1	Artie Burns	Fr
S	2	Deon Bush	So
ILB	94	Kelvin Cain	Sr
S	12	Jamal Carter	Fr
DE	71	Anthony Chickillo	Jr
CB	41	Wyatt Chickillo	Fr
OLB	31	Tyrone Cornileus	Sr
ILB	47	Akil Craig	Sr
CB	21	Antonio Crawford	So
CB	48	Hugo Delapenha Jr.	Sr
CB	35	Nate Dortch (injured)	Fr
CB	29	Corn Elder (injured)	Fr
S	28	Nantambu-Akil Fentress	Jr
OLB	36	Alex Figueroa (injured)	Fr
CB	25	Amin Fooman	So
ILB	59	Jimmy Gaines	Sr
DE	11	David Gilbert	Sr
ILB	53	Jared Goldenberg	Fr
OLB	5	Jermaine Grace	Fr
DE	51	Shayon Green	Sr
CB	37	Ladarius Gunter (injured)	Jr
DE/DT	99	Jelani Hamilton	So
S	30	A.J. Highsmith	Sr
DE	97	Dwayne Hoilett (injured)	Fr
CB	24	Larry Hope	Fr
CB	3	Tracy Howard	So
CB	37	Alex Irastorza	Sr
S	26	Rayshawn Jenkins	So
DE/DT	90	Ufomba Kamalu	So
DT	67	Corey King	So
ILB	56	Raphael Kirby	So
CB	20	Ray Lewis III	Fr
S	45	Andrew McClelland	Fr
DE/OLB	17	Tyriq McCord	So
DT	72	Earl Moore	So
DE/OLB	98	Al-Quadin Muhammad	Fr
DE	58	Anthony Naser	Jr
DE	95	David Perry	Jr
OLB	52	Denzel Perryman	Jr
DT	91	Olsen Pierre	Jr
DT	96	Curtis Porter	Sr
DT	78	Justin Renfrow	Sr
DT	93	Luther Robinson	Sr
S	22	Kacy Rodgers	Sr
S	38	Jordan Tolson	Jr

Special teams

Pos.	#	Name	Class
K	48	Josh Bacon	Fr
P	84	Austin Barnard	Fr
P	27	Ricky Carroll	Jr
P/K	40	Grant Coffman	Fr
P	88	Zach Costa	So
LS	55	Frank Gabriel	So
K	18	Matt Goudis	So
LS/OL	61	Paul Kelly	Sr
LS	57	Sean McNally	Sr
P	16	Pat O'Donnell	Sr
LS/LB	39	Ronald Regula	Jr

Head coach

- Al Golden (3rd year) – Head Coach/special teams coordinator

Coordinators/assistant coaches

- Mark D'Onofrio – Assistant Head Coach/defensive coordinator
- James Coley – Offensive coordinator/quarterbacks
- Jethro Franklin – Senior Defensive Assistant/defensive line
- Larry Scott – Tight ends
- Hurlie Brown – Running backs/Florida Recruiting coordinator
- Art Kehoe – Offensive line
- Brennan Carroll – Wide receivers/National Recruiting coordinator
- Paul Williams – Defensive backs
- Michael Barrow – Linebackers
- Kareem Brown – Grad. Asst. Defensive tackles
- Derron Montgomery – Grad. Asst. Slot Receivers
- Chris O'Hara – Grad. Asst. Cornerbacks
- Cole Pemberton – Grad. Asst. Offensive line

Legend

- (C) Team captain
- (S) Suspended
- (I) Ineligible
- Injured
- Redshirt

Roster

== Recruiting ==
=== Position key ===
Back	B	Center	C	Cornerback	CB	Defensive back	DB
Defensive end	DE	Defensive lineman	DL	Defensive tackle	DT	End	E
Fullback	FB	Guard	G	Halfback	HB	Kicker	K
Kickoff returner	KR	Offensive tackle	OT	Offensive lineman	OL	Linebacker	LB
Long snapper	LS	Punter	P	Punt returner	PR	Quarterback	QB
Running back	RB	Safety	S	Tight end	TE	Wide receiver	WR

=== Recruits ===
College recruiting information (2013)
Name	Hometown	School	Height	Weight	40^{‡}	Commit date
Artie Burns; CB	Miami, Florida	Miami Northwestern HS	6 ft 0 in (1.83 m)	183 lb (83 kg)	Jul 23, 2012	
Artie Burns; CB	Recruit ratings: Scout: Rivals: (85)					
Jamal Carter; S	Homestead, Florida	Miami Southridge HS	6 ft 1 in (1.85 m)	190 lb (86 kg)	Jul 26, 2012	
Jamal Carter; S	Recruit ratings: Scout: Rivals: (82)					
Stacy Coley; WR	Pompano Beach, Florida	Northeast HS	6 ft 1 in (1.85 m)	173 lb (78 kg)	Feb 6, 2013	
Stacy Coley; WR	Recruit ratings: Scout: Rivals: (87)					
Standish Dobard; TE	Belle Chasse, Louisiana	Edna Karr HS	6 ft 4 in (1.93 m)	255 lb (116 kg)	Apr 4, 2012	
Standish Dobard; TE	Recruit ratings: Scout: Rivals: (83)					
Augustus Edwards; RB	Staten Island, New York	Tottenville HS	6 ft 2 in (1.88 m)	230 lb (100 kg)	Feb 6, 2013	
Augustus Edwards; RB	Recruit ratings: Scout: Rivals: (77)					
Cornelius Elder; RB	Nashville, Tennessee	Ensworth HS	5 ft 10 in (1.78 m)	170 lb (77 kg)	Feb 13, 2013	
Cornelius Elder; RB	Recruit ratings: Scout: Rivals: (83)					
Alex Figueroa; OLB	Stafford, Virginia	Brooke Point HS	6 ft 3 in (1.91 m)	225 lb (102 kg)	Dec 1, 2012	
Alex Figueroa; OLB	Recruit ratings: Scout: (78)					
Alex Gall; OL	Mason, Ohio	Moeller HS	6 ft 5 in (1.96 m)	290 lb (130 kg)	Jun 20, 2012	
Alex Gall; OL	Recruit ratings: Scout: Rivals: (77)					
Jermaine Grace; OLB	Miami Gardens, Florida	Miramar HS	6 ft 2 in (1.88 m)	210 lb (95 kg)	Feb 6, 2013	
Jermaine Grace; OLB	Recruit ratings: Scout: Rivals: (83)					
Derrick Griffin; WR	Rosenberg, Texas	B.F. Terry HS	6 ft 6 in (1.98 m)	215 lb (98 kg)	Feb 19, 2013	
Derrick Griffin; WR	Recruit ratings: Scout: Rivals: (88)					
Ufomba Kamalu; DE	Fayetteville, Georgia	Butler CC (El Dorado, Kansas)	6 ft 6 in (1.98 m)	280 lb (130 kg)	Jan 20, 2013	
Ufomba Kamalu; DE	Recruit ratings: Scout: Rivals: (78)					
Hunter Knighton; OL	Pottstown, Pennsylvania	Hun School of Princeton	6 ft 5 in (1.96 m)	265 lb (120 kg)	Dec 10, 2012	
Hunter Knighton; OL	Recruit ratings: Scout: Rivals: (76)					
Ray Lewis III; ATH	Longwood, Florida	Lake Mary Prep	5 ft 9 in (1.75 m)	190 lb (86 kg)	Mar 20, 2012	
Ray Lewis III; ATH	Recruit ratings: Scout: Rivals: (73)					
Ryheem Lockley; S	Saluda, Virginia	Middlesex HS	6 ft 4 in (1.93 m)	220 lb (100 kg)	Feb 3, 2013	
Ryheem Lockley; S	Recruit ratings: Scout: Rivals: (74)					
Al-Quadin Muhammad; DE	Irvington, New Jersey	Don Bosco Prep	6 ft 3 in (1.91 m)	220 lb (100 kg)	Jan 5, 2013	
Al-Quadin Muhammad; DE	Recruit ratings: Scout: Rivals: (85)					
Sunny Odogwu; OL	Baltimore, Maryland	Hargrave Military Academy	6 ft 8 in (2.03 m)	311 lb (141 kg)	Dec 28, 2012	
Sunny Odogwu; OL	Recruit ratings: Scout: Rivals: (76)					
Kevin Olsen; QB	Wayne, New Jersey	Wayne Hills High School	6 ft 3 in (1.91 m)	200 lb (91 kg)	May 18, 2012	
Kevin Olsen; QB	Recruit ratings: Scout: Rivals: (84)					
Beau Sandland; TE	Woodland Hills, California	Pierce College	6 ft 6 in (1.98 m)	255 lb (116 kg)	Dec 19, 2012	
Beau Sandland; TE	Recruit ratings: Scout: Rivals: (83)					
Overall recruit ranking: Scout: 24 Rivals: 20 ESPN: 15
Note: In many cases, Scout, Rivals, 247Sports, On3, and ESPN may conflict in their listings of height and weight.; In these cases, the average was taken. ESPN grades are on a 100-point scale.; Sources: "Miami Signee List 2013". Rivals.; "Scout.com Football Recruiting: Miami". Scout.; "2013 Player Signees- Miami". ESPN.; "Scout.com Team Recruiting Rankings". Scout.; "2013 Team Ranking". Rivals.com.

== Schedule ==
Date	Time	Opponent	Rank	Site	TV	Result	Attendance
August 30	8:00 pm	Florida Atlantic*		Sun Life Stadium; Miami Gardens, FL	ESPNU	W 34–6	50,151
September 7	12:00 pm	No. 12 Florida*		Sun Life Stadium; Miami Gardens, FL (rivalry)	ESPN	W 21–16	76,968
September 21	7:00 pm	Savannah State*	No. 16	Sun Life Stadium; Miami Gardens, FL	ESPN3	W 77–7	42,571
September 28	12:00 pm	at South Florida*	No. 15	Raymond James Stadium; Tampa, FL	ESPNU	W 49–21	47,562
October 5	3:30 pm	Georgia Tech	No. 14	Sun Life Stadium; Miami Gardens, FL	ESPNU	W 45–30	47,008
October 17	7:30 pm	at North Carolina	No. 10	Kenan Memorial Stadium; Chapel Hill, NC	ESPN	W 27–23	56,000
October 26	12:00 pm	Wake Forest	No. 7	Sun Life Stadium; Miami Gardens, FL	ESPNU	W 24–21	66,160
November 2	8:00 pm	at No. 3 Florida State	No. 7	Doak Campbell Stadium; Tallahassee, FL (rivalry) (College GameDay)	ABC	L 14–41	84,409
November 9	7:00 pm	Virginia Tech^{†}	No. 14	Sun Life Stadium; Miami Gardens, FL (rivalry)	ESPN	L 24–42	49,267
November 16	3:30 pm	at Duke	No. 24	Wallace Wade Stadium; Durham, NC	ESPNU	L 30–48	30,044
November 23	12:00 pm	Virginia		Sun Life Stadium; Miami Gardens, FL	ESPNU	W 45–26	44,732
November 29	3:30 pm	at Pittsburgh		Heinz Field; Pittsburgh, PA	ABC	W 41–31	40,003
December 28	6:45 pm	vs. No. 18 Louisville*		Florida Citrus Bowl; Orlando, FL (rivalry) (Russell Athletic Bowl)	ESPN	L 9–36	51,098
*Non-conference game; ^{†}Homecoming; Rankings from AP Poll released prior to the game; All times are in Eastern time

== Rankings ==
Ranking movements Legend: ██ Increase in ranking ██ Decrease in ranking — = Not ranked RV = Received votes
	Week																
Poll	Pre	1	2	3	4	5	6	7	8	9	10	11	12	13	14	15	Final
AP	RV	RV	15	16	15	14	13	10	7	7	14	24	—	—	RV	RV	—
Coaches	RV	24	18	17	15	14	14	11	6	6	14	23	RV	RV	RV	25	RV
Harris	Not released							10	7	7	13	23	RV	RV	RV	RV	Not released
BCS	Not released								7	7	11	23	—	—	—	—	Not released

== 2014 NFL draft ==
Player	Position	Round	Pick	Team
Brandon Linder	Offensive line	3	93	Jacksonville Jaguars
Pat O'Donnell	Punter	6	191	Chicago Bears
Seantrel Henderson	Offensive line	7	237	Buffalo Bills
