= 2015 Miami Hurricanes football team =

American college football season

2015 Miami Hurricanes football

Sun Bowl, L 14–20 vs. Washington State
- Conference: Atlantic Coast Conference
- Coastal Division
- Record: 8–5 (5–3 ACC)
- Head coach: Al Golden (5th season; first 7 games); Larry Scott (interim; remainder of season)
- Offensive coordinator: James Coley (3rd season)
- Offensive scheme: Multiple pro-style
- Defensive coordinator: Mark D'Onofrio (5th season)
- Base defense: Multiple 4–3
- Home stadium: Sun Life Stadium

2015 Atlantic Coast Conference football standings
	Conf.			Overall
Team	W		L	W		L
Atlantic Division
No. 2 Clemson x$^	8	–	0	14	–	1
No. 14 Florida State	6	–	2	10	–	3
Louisville	5	–	3	8	–	5
NC State	3	–	5	7	–	6
Syracuse	2	–	6	4	–	8
Wake Forest	1	–	7	3	–	9
Boston College	0	–	8	3	–	9
Coastal Division
No. 15 North Carolina x	8	–	0	11	–	3
Pittsburgh	6	–	2	8	–	5
Miami (FL)	5	–	3	8	–	5
Duke	4	–	4	8	–	5
Virginia Tech	4	–	4	7	–	6
Virginia	3	–	5	4	–	8
Georgia Tech	1	–	7	3	–	9
Championship: Clemson 45, North Carolina 37
^ – College Football Playoff participant; $ – Conference champion; x – Division champion/co-champions; Rankings from AP Poll

The 2015 Miami Hurricanes football team (variously "Miami", "The U", "UM", "'Canes") represented the University of Miami during the 2015 NCAA Division I FBS football season. The Hurricanes were led by fifth-year head coach Al Golden, who was fired following a 58–0 loss at home to Clemson, and replaced by Larry Scott, who acted as the interim coach. They played their home games at Sun Life Stadium in Miami Gardens, Florida. It was the Hurricanes' 90th overall season and their 12th as a member of the Atlantic Coast Conference. They finished the season 8–5, 5–3 in ACC play to finish in 3rd place in the Coastal Division. They were invited to the Sun Bowl, where they lost to Washington State.

On December 4, 2015, the university announced Mark Richt as head coach, effective immediately.

== Personnel ==
=== Coaching staff ===
Name	Position	Seasons	Alma mater
Al Golden	Head coach	5th	Penn State (1991)
Larry Scott	Interim head coach/tight ends	3rd	South Florida (2000)
Mark D'Onofrio	Assistant head coach/defensive coordinator	5th	Penn State (1991)
James Coley	Offensive coordinator/quarterbacks	3rd	Florida State (1997)
Randy Melvin	Defensive line	1st	Eastern Illinois (1982)
Hurlie Brown	Linebackers/recruiting coordinator	3rd	Miami (1992)
Kevin Beard	Wide receivers	1st	Miami (2004)
Art Kehoe	Offensive line	26th	Miami (1982)
Paul Williams	Defensive backs	5th	Delaware (1996)
Tim Harris	Running backs	5th	Carthage

=== Support staff ===
Name	Position	Seasons	Alma mater
Andreu Swasey	Strength & conditioning	15th	Baylor (1995)
Cole Pemberton	Graduate assistant	2nd	Colorado State (2009)
Mike Zuckerman	Graduate assistant	1st	Miami (2012)

== Schedule ==
Date	Time	Opponent	Site	TV	Result	Attendance
September 5	6:00 pm	Bethune-Cookman*	Sun Life Stadium; Miami Gardens, FL	ESPN3	W 45–0	43,467
September 11	8:00 pm	at Florida Atlantic*	FAU Stadium; Boca Raton, FL	FS1	W 44–20	30,321
September 19	3:30 pm	Nebraska*	Sun Life Stadium; Miami Gardens, FL (rivalry)	ABC/ESPN2	W 36–33 ^{OT}	53,580
October 1	7:30 pm	at Cincinnati*	Nippert Stadium; Cincinnati, OH	ESPN	L 23–34	40,101
October 10	8:00 pm	at No. 12 Florida State	Doak Campbell Stadium; Tallahassee, FL (rivalry)	ABC	L 24–29	82,329
October 17	3:30 pm	Virginia Tech	Sun Life Stadium; Miami Gardens, FL (rivalry)	ESPNU	W 30–20	50,787
October 24	12:00 pm	No. 6 Clemson	Sun Life Stadium; Miami Gardens, FL	ABC	L 0–58	45,211
October 31	7:00 pm	at No. 22 Duke	Wallace Wade Stadium; Durham, NC	ESPNU	W 30–27	30,143
November 7	3:00 pm	Virginia^{†}	Sun Life Stadium; Miami Gardens, FL	RSN	W 27–21	40,963
November 14	3:30 pm	at No. 17 North Carolina	Kenan Memorial Stadium; Chapel Hill, NC	ESPNU	L 21–59	61,000
November 21	12:30 pm	Georgia Tech	Sun Life Stadium; Miami Gardens, FL	ACCN	W 38–21	51,355
November 27	12:00 pm	at Pittsburgh	Heinz Field; Pittsburgh, PA	ESPN2	W 29–24	40,126
December 26	2:00 pm	vs. Washington State*	Sun Bowl Stadium; El Paso, TX (Sun Bowl)	CBS	L 14–20	41,180
*Non-conference game; ^{†}Homecoming; Rankings from AP Poll released prior to the game; All times are in Eastern time

=== Roster ===
As of May 2015

2015 Miami Hurricanes football team roster
Players
Coaches
Offense

Pos.	#	Name	Class
RB	22	Collin Alford	Jr
OL	61	Adam Arnaout	So
WR	8	Braxton Berrios	So
WR	82	Tyre Brady	So
G	55	Joe Brown	Fr
WR		Lawrence Cager	Fr
CB	30	Quincy Casimir	Jr
WR	3	Stacy Coley	Jr
QB	13	Gray Crow	Jr
OL	73	Trevor Darling	So
TE	5	Standish Dobard	Jr
RB	7	Gus Edwards	Jr
RB	49	Joel Evans	Fr
OT	76	Taylor Gadbois	Jr
G	67	Alex Gall	Jr
OT		Tyler Gauthier	Fr
OL	59	Justin Goldberg	So
WR	84	Greg Golden	So
FB	40	Matt Golden	So
RB	32	Trayone Gray	So
OL	69	Tyler Grimsley	Fr
TE	23	Chris Herndon	So
QB	25	Isaac Hoza	So
G	63	Danny Isidora	Jr
OL	65	Sterling Jackson	Fr
WR	17	D'Mauri Jones	Jr
OT	77	Jahair Jones	Fr
QB	15	Brad Kaaya	So
C/OG	54	Hunter Knighton	So
WR	81	Darrell Langham	Fr
WR	9	Malcolm Lewis	Jr
C	68	Nick Linder	So
OT		Brendan Loftus	Fr
TE	46	Marcus Lugo	Fr
OT		Hayden Mahoney	Fr
OT	52	K. C. McDermott	So
OT		Bar Milo	Fr
TE	86	David Njoku	Fr
TE	88	Jake O'Donnell	Jr
FB	43	Tyler Odems	Jr
OT	66	Sunny Odogwu	So
OT	60	Patrick Petrillo	So
WR	35	Austin Pfenninger	So
TE	38	Joseph Rodgers	Sr
QB	12	Malik Rosier	Fr
WR	11	Rashawn Scott	Sr
QB		Evan Shirreffs	Fr
OT		Tyree St. Louis	Fr
TE	85	Michael Tashman	Fr
QB	14	Vincent Testaverde	So
FB	44	Walter Tucker	Jr
WR	19	Clayton Turner	So
RB		Mark Walton	Fr
TE	87	Jerome Washington	Fr
WR	6	Herb Waters	Sr
QB	20	Michael Welch	So
G	64	Hunter Wells	Sr
RB	2	Joseph Yearby	So

Defense

Pos.	#	Name	Class
CB	1	Artie Burns	Jr
S	2	Deon Bush	Sr
S	6	Jamal Carter	Jr
LB	41	Wyatt Chickillo	So
S	25	Dallas Crawford	Sr
CB	29	Corn Elder	Jr
DT		Ryan Fines	Fr
LB	55	Frank Gabriel	Jr
OLB	13	Marques Gayot	So
ILB	53	Jared Goldenberg	Fr
LB		Jamie Gordinier	Fr
OLB	5	Jermaine Grace	So
DE/DT	99	Jelani Hamilton	Jr
DE/OLB	33	Trent Harris	So
CB		Terrance Henley	Fr
DT	93	Calvin Heurtelou	Sr
CB	3	Tracy Howard	Sr
DE/OLB	31	Demetrius Jackson	Fr
CB		Michael Jackson	Fr
DT	92	Courtel Jenkins	So
S	26	Rayshawn Jenkins	Jr
S	4	Jaquan Johnson	Fr
CB	24	Josh Johnson	So
DE/DT	47	Ufomba Kamalu	Sr
DT	90	Corey King	Sr
OLB		James King	Fr
ILB	56	Raphael Kirby	Sr
S		Robert Knowles	Fr
CB	27	Ryan Mayes	Fr
DE/OLB	17	Tyriq McCord	Sr
ILB	23	Terry McCray	Fr
LB	59	Michael McGinnis	So
DE		R. J. McIntosh	Fr
DT	97	Earl Moore	Jr
DT/DE	95	Anthony Moten	So
DE/OLB	8	Al-Quadin Muhammad	So
DT		Kendrick Norton	Fr
OLB	58	Darrion Owens	So
DE	19	Scott Patchan	Fr
ILB	34	Charles Perry	Fr
CB		Sheldrick Redwine	Fr
OLB	57	Mike Smith	Fr
LB	36	Teddy Stavetski	Fr
FS	22	Christian Gonzalez-Santos	Fr
DE	9	Chad Thomas	So
DT	11	Michael Wyche	Sr
ILB	51	Juwon Young	So

Special teams

Pos.	#	Name	Class
K	48	Josh Bacon	So
K/P	15	Michael Badgley	So
P/K	40	Grant Coffman	So
K/P	97	JC Contorakes	So
P/K	45	Ryan Holowesko	Sr
K	43	Jon Semerene	So
P/K	16	Justin Vogel	Jr

Head coach

- Larry Scott (interim)/Tight Ends

Coordinators/assistant coaches

- Mark D'Onofrio – Assistant Head Coach/Defensive Coordinator
- James Coley – Offensive Coordinator/Quarterbacks
- Kevin Beard – Wide Receivers
- Hurlie Brown – Linebackers
- Tim Harris – Running Backs
- Art Kehoe – Offensive Line
- Paul Williams – Defensive Backs
- Brandon Lumish – Quality Control Offense
- Kareem Brown – Grad. Asst. Defensive Line
- Cole Pemberton – Grad. Asst. Offensive Line
- Mike Zuckerman – Grad. Asst. Outside Linebackers

Legend

- (C) Team captain
- (S) Suspended
- (I) Ineligible
- Injured
- Redshirt

Roster

== Game summaries ==
=== Bethune-Cookman ===
	1	2	3	4	Total
Wildcats	0	0	0	0	0
Hurricanes	7	24	7	7	45

=== At Florida Atlantic ===
	1	2	3	4	Total
Hurricanes	14	6	17	7	44
Owls	10	7	3	0	20

=== Nebraska ===
	1	2	3	4	OT	Total
Cornhuskers	0	3	7	23	0	33
Hurricanes	17	3	10	3	3	36

=== At Cincinnati ===
	1	2	3	4	Total
Hurricanes	13	7	0	3	23
Bearcats	14	13	0	7	34

=== At Florida State ===
	1	2	3	4	Total
Hurricanes	3	7	7	7	24
#12 Seminoles	14	6	0	9	29

=== Virginia Tech ===
	1	2	3	4	Total
Hokies	10	3	0	7	20
Hurricanes	10	10	3	7	30

=== Clemson ===
	1	2	3	4	Total
#6 Tigers	21	21	3	13	58
Hurricanes	0	0	0	0	0

=== At Duke ===
	1	2	3	4	Total
Hurricanes	0	14	0	16	30
#22 Blue Devils	0	3	9	15	27

=== Virginia ===
	1	2	3	4	Total
Cavaliers	0	8	7	6	21
Hurricanes	0	14	3	10	27

=== At North Carolina ===
	1	2	3	4	Total
Hurricanes	0	0	7	14	21
#17 Tar Heels	7	24	21	7	59

=== Georgia Tech ===
	1	2	3	4	Total
Yellow Jackets	7	0	0	14	21
Hurricanes	7	17	7	7	38

=== At Pittsburgh ===
	1	2	3	4	Total
Hurricanes	17	6	0	6	29
Panthers	0	3	7	14	24

=== Vs. Washington State–Sun Bowl ===
	1	2	3	4	Total
Hurricanes	7	0	0	7	14
Cougars	7	13	0	0	20

== 2016 NFL draft ==
Player	Position	Round	Pick	NFL club
Artie Burns	Cornerback	1	25	Pittsburgh Steelers
Deon Bush	Safety	4	124	Chicago Bears
