= 2015 Virginia Cavaliers football team =

American college football season

2015 Virginia Cavaliers football
- Conference: Atlantic Coast Conference
- Coastal Division
- Record: 4–8 (3–5 ACC)
- Head coach: Mike London (6th season)
- Offensive coordinator: Steve Fairchild (3rd season)
- Offensive scheme: Pro-style
- Defensive coordinator: Jon Tenuta (3rd season)
- Base defense: 4–3
- Home stadium: Scott Stadium

2015 Atlantic Coast Conference football standings
	Conf.			Overall
Team	W		L	W		L
Atlantic Division
No. 2 Clemson x$^	8	–	0	14	–	1
No. 14 Florida State	6	–	2	10	–	3
Louisville	5	–	3	8	–	5
NC State	3	–	5	7	–	6
Syracuse	2	–	6	4	–	8
Wake Forest	1	–	7	3	–	9
Boston College	0	–	8	3	–	9
Coastal Division
No. 15 North Carolina x	8	–	0	11	–	3
Pittsburgh	6	–	2	8	–	5
Miami (FL)	5	–	3	8	–	5
Duke	4	–	4	8	–	5
Virginia Tech	4	–	4	7	–	6
Virginia	3	–	5	4	–	8
Georgia Tech	1	–	7	3	–	9
Championship: Clemson 45, North Carolina 37
^ – College Football Playoff participant; $ – Conference champion; x – Division champion/co-champions; Rankings from AP Poll

The 2015 Virginia Cavaliers football team represented the University of Virginia in the 2015 NCAA Division I FBS football season. The Cavaliers were led by sixth year head coach Mike London and played their home games at Scott Stadium. They were members of the Coastal Division of the Atlantic Coast Conference. They finished the season 4–8, 3–5 in ACC play to finish in sixth place in the Coastal Division.

On November 29, head coach Mike London resigned. He finished at Virginia with a six year record of 27–46.

== Last season ==
The 2014 Cavaliers finished with a record of 5–7, 3–5 in ACC play to finish in a three way tie for fifth place in the Coastal Division.

== Roster ==
2015 Virginia Cavaliers football team roster
Players
Coaches
Offense

Pos.	#	Name	Class
C	50	Jackson Matteo	Jr
C	60	John Pond	Sr
C	68	Eric Tetlow	So
C	78	R.J. Proctor	Fr
FB	41	Connor Wingo-Reeves	Jr
FB	47	Vincent Croce (C)	Sr
G	62	Sean Karl	Jr
G	63	Ryan Doull	Jr
G	65	Ross Burbank (C)	Sr
G	66	Patrick Kidd	Fr
G	70	Steven Moss	RFr
G	71	Jack McDonald	So
OT	52	Grant Polk	Fr
OT	61	Trenton Jenkins	Fr
OT	64	Jake Fieler	RFr
OT	67	Jack English	So
OT	72	Eric Smith	Jr
OT	74	Ryan Bischoff	Fr
OT	75	Sadiq Olanrewaju	Jr
OT	76	Michael Mooney	Jr
OT	77	Jay Whitmire	Sr
QB	2	Connor Brewer	Jr
QB	3	Corwin Cutler	RFr
QB	6	Nick Johns	Fr
QB	7	Joe Spaziani	RFr
QB	11	Hunter Byrnes	Fr
QB	15	Matt Johns	Jr
QB	18	Andrew Mackay	So
RB	4	Taquan Mizzell	Jr
RB	5	Albert Reid	Jr
RB	10	Jordan Ellis	RFr
RB	22	Daniel Hamm	So
RB	25	Chris Sharp	Fr
RB	26	Anthony Calloway	So
RB	30	LaChaston Smith	Jr
RB	33	Olamide Zaccheaus	Fr
TE	16	Brendan Marshall	So
TE	44	Tanner Cowley	Fr
TE	45	Evan Butts	RFr
TE	86	Charlie Hopkins	Sr
TE	87	Richard Burney	Fr
TE	89	Rob Burns	Sr
WR	1	Warren Craft	Fr
WR	8	T.J. Thorpe	Sr
WR	9	Canaan Severin (C)	Sr
WR	14	Andre Levrone	So
WR	17	Kyle Dockins	Jr
WR	19	Doni Dowling	So
WR	23	Umar Muhammad-Wyatt	RFr
WR	37	Braedon Urie	RFr
WR	81	Jamall Brown	Jr
WR	82	David Eldridge	Fr
WR	83	Ben Hogg	RFr
WR	84	Ross Gardner	RFr
WR	85	Keeon Johnson	Jr
WR	88	Ryan Santoro	So

Defense

Pos.	#	Name	Class
DB	1	Demetrious Nicholson	Sr
DB	2	Kirk Garner	So
DB	5	Tim Harris	Jr
DB	7	Kareem Gibson	Fr
DB	11	Divante Walker	Jr
DB	13	Myles Robinson	Fr
DB	26	Maurice Canady	Sr
DB	39	Darious Latimore	RFr
DE	6	Darrious Carter	RFr
DE	31	Chris Peace	RFr
DE	32	Mike Moore	Sr
DE	34	Kwontie Moore	Sr
DE	43	Trent Corney	Sr
DE	94	Naji Abdullah	Fr
DE	96	Steven Wright	Fr
DT	9	Andrew Brown	So
DT	55	David Dean (C)	Sr
DT	56	Andre Miles-Redmond	Jr
DT	57	James Trucilla	Fr
DT	58	Eli Hanback	Fr
DT	74	John Tyson	Fr
DT	79	Jack Babcock	So
DT	93	Donte Wilkins	Jr
DT	95	Spencer Bibb	So
FS	3	Quin Blanding	So
FS	21	Juan Thornhill	Fr
LB	15	C.J. Stalker	Fr
LB	22	Jahvoni Simmons	Fr
LB	27	Malcolm Cook	So
LB	29	Eric Gallon	Fr
LB	30	Dominic Sheppard	Fr
LB	36	Gladimir Paul	Fr
LB	40	Reed Kellam	Fr
LB	41	Michael Guerci	RFr
LB	46	Sean Fitzgerald	Fr
LB	47	Tucker Gamble	RFr
LB	51	Zach Bradshaw	Jr
LB	53	Micah Kiser	So
LB	54	Cory Jones	RFr
LB	59	Mark Hall	Jr
LB	90	Austin Petty	Fr
S	20	CJ Epps	Fr
SS	16	Mason Thomas	Sr
SS	28	Wilfred Wahee	Jr
SS	38	Kelvin Rainey	Jr

Special teams

Pos.	#	Name	Class
LS	42	Tyler Shirley	So
LS	80	Connor Atkins	Fr
P	18	Nicholas Conte	Jr
P	32	James Coleman	Jr
P	93	Lester Coleman	RFr
P	98	Trace Halpern	Fr
PK	14	Ian Frye	Sr
PK	91	Dylan Sims	Jr
PK	92	Andrew King	RFr

Head coach

- Mike London (Richmond, 1982)

Coordinators/assistant coaches

- Jon Tenuta (Virginia, 1982)
  Associate head coach for Defense/defensive coordinator/safeties
- Mike Archer (Miami (FL), 1976)
  Associate head coach/linebackers
- Jappy Oliver (Purdue, 1978)
  Defensive line
- Steve Fairchild (Colorado State, 1980)
  Offensive coordinator/quarterbacks
- Larry Lewis (Boise State, 1980)
  Special teams coordinator/tight ends
- Chris Beatty (East Tennessee State, 1995)
  Running backs
- Marques Hagans (Virginia, 2005)
  Wide receivers
- Dave Borbely (DePauw, 1981)
  Offensive line
- Chip West (Livingstone College, 1993)
  Cornerbacks/recruiting coordinator
- Ryan Tedford (Sam Houston State, 1995)
  Dir. of football training & player development

Legend

- (C) Team captain
- (S) Suspended
- (I) Ineligible
- Injured
- Redshirt

Roster
Last update: September 5, 2015

=== Coaching changes ===
On December 14, 2014, offensive line coach Scott Wachenheim was named head coach of the VMI Keydets. On January 6, 2015, Tom O'Brien officially retired. Eight days later, Chris Beatty and Dave Borbely were hired as running backs and offensive line coaches, respectively, with Larry Lewis taking over responsibilities as tight ends coach.

=== Depth chart ===
Defense

FS
Quin Blanding
Divante Walker
Juan Thornhill

WLB	MLB	SLB
C.J. Stalker	Micah Kiser	Zach Bradshaw
⋅	Dominic Sheppard	Mark Hall
⋅	⋅	⋅

SS
Kelvin Rainey
Wilfred Wahee
⋅

CB
Maurice Canady
Tim Harris
⋅

DE	DT	DT	DE
Mike Moore	Andrew Brown	David Dean	Kwontie Moore
TrenT Corney	Donte Wilkins	Andre Miles-Redmond	Trent Corney
Darrious Carter	⋅	⋅	Chris Peace

CB
Demetrious Nicholson
Darious Latimore
⋅

Offense

X-Receiver
Canaan Severin
Olamide Zaccheaus
⋅

LT	LG	C	RG	RT
Michael Mooney	Jack McDonald	Jackson Matteo	Ross Burbank	Eric Smith
Jack English	John Pond	Ross Burbank	Sean Karl	Jay Whitmire
⋅	⋅	⋅	⋅	⋅

TE
Charlie Hopkins
Evan Butts
Rob Burns

Z-Receiver
Keeon Johnson
David Eldridge
⋅

QB
Matt Johns
Conner Brewer
Corwin Cutler

Key reserves
WR (F) Andrew Levrone
WR (F) Kyle Dockins
RB Jordan Ellis
PR Taquan Mizzell
KR Taquan Mizzell
KR Ian Frye
KO Ian Frye

RB
Taquan Mizzell
Albert Reid
Daniel Hamm

FB
Vincent Croce
Connor Wingo-Reeves
LaChaston Smith

Special teams
PK Ian Frye
PK Dylan Sims
P Nicholas Conte
P James Coleman
KR Dylan Sims
PR Taquan Mizzell
LS Tyler Shirley

== Schedule ==
Date	Time	Opponent	Site	TV	Result	Attendance
September 5	3:30 pm	at No. 13 UCLA*	Rose Bowl; Los Angeles, CA	FOX	L 16–34	68,815
September 12	3:30 pm	No. 9 Notre Dame*	Scott Stadium; Charlottesville, VA	ABC	L 27–34	58,200
September 19	3:30 pm	William & Mary*	Scott Stadium; Charlottesville, VA	ESPN3	W 35–29	41,881
September 25	8:00 pm	Boise State*	Scott Stadium; Charlottesville, VA	ESPN	L 14–56	42,427
October 10	12:30 pm	at Pittsburgh	Heinz Field; Pittsburgh, PA	ACCN	L 19–26	45,237
October 17	3:30 pm	Syracuse^{†}	Scott Stadium; Charlottesville, VA	ACCRSN	W 44–38 ^{3OT}	39,223
October 24	3:30 pm	at North Carolina	Kenan Memorial Stadium; Chapel Hill, NC (South's Oldest Rivalry)	ACCRSN	L 13–26	52,000
October 31	3:00 pm	Georgia Tech	Scott Stadium; Charlottesville, VA	ACCRSN	W 27–21	32,308
November 7	3:00 pm	at Miami (FL)	Sun Life Stadium; Miami Gardens, FL	ACCRSN	L 21–27	40,963
November 14	12:30 pm	at Louisville	Papa John's Cardinal Stadium; Louisville, KY	ACCRSN	L 31–38	51,233
November 21	3:30 pm	Duke	Scott Stadium; Charlottesville, VA	ESPN3	W 42–34	35,178
November 28	12:00 pm	Virginia Tech	Scott Stadium; Charlottesville, VA (Battle for the Commonwealth Cup)	ESPNU	L 20–23	53,777
*Non-conference game; ^{†}Homecoming; Rankings from AP Poll released prior to game; All times are in Eastern time

Schedule source:

== Game summaries ==
=== UCLA ===
Virginia Cavaliers vs #13 UCLA Bruins

Quarter	1	2	3	4	Total
Virginia	3	6	0	7	16
#13 UCLA	7	10	14	3	34

at Rose Bowl • Los Angeles, California

- Date: September 5, 2015
- Game time: 3:30 p.m. EDT
- Game weather: Temperature: 74 °F (23 °C) • Wind: SW 6 mph • Weather: Light haze
- Game attendance: 68,815
- Referee: Jerry Magallanes • Umpire: Terrance Ramsey • Linesman: Matt Fitzgerald • Line judge: Deon Lawrence • Back judge: Rob Luklan • Field judge: Wayne Rundell • Side judge: M. McCarthy • Center judge: Tracy Lynch
- TV announcers (FOX): Joe Davis, Brady Quinn, Kris Budden
- Virginia vs UCLA (Sep 5, 2015)

Game information

First Quarter

- Virginia – Ian Frye 42-yard field goal
- UCLA – Devin Fuller 4-yard pass from Josh Rosen (Kaʻimi Fairbairn kick)

Second Quarter

- Virginia – Frye 31-yard field goal
- UCLA – Thomas Duarte 30-yard pass from Rosen (Fairbairn kick)
- Virginia – Frye 19-yard field goal
- UCLA – Fairbairn 26-yard field goal

Third Quarter

- UCLA – Myles Jack 1-yard run (Fairbairn kick)
- UCLA – Kenny Clark pass from Rosen (Fairbairn kick)

Fourth Quarter

- UCLA – Fairbairn 21-yard field goal
- Virginia – Taquan Mizzell 19-yard pass from Matt Johns (Frye kick)

Top Passers

- Virginia – Matt Johns, 21/35, 238 yards, 1 TD
- UCLA – Josh Rosen, 28/35, 351 yards

Top Rushers

- Virginia – Taquan Mizzell, 16 carries / 45 yards
- UCLA – Soso Jamabo, 9 carries / 79 yards

Top Receiving

- Virginia – Taquan Mizzell, 8 receptions / 100 yards, 1 TD
- UCLA – Devin Fuller, 6 receptions / 44 yards

Top Tackler

- Virginia – Micah Kiser, 12 tackles
- UCLA – Eddie Vanderdoes, 8 tackles

=== Notre Dame ===
#9 Notre Dame Fighting Irish vs Virginia Cavaliers

Quarter	1	2	3	4	Total
#9 Notre Dame	12	0	14	8	34
Virginia	0	14	0	13	27

at Scott Stadium • Charlottesville, Virginia

- Date: September 12, 2015
- Game time: 3:30 p.m. EDT
- Game weather: Temperature: 73 °F (23 °C) • Wind: SSW 4 mph • Weather: Cloudy
- Game attendance: 58,200
- Referee: Gary Patterson • Umpire: Rich McMahan • Linesman: Michael Kelley • Line judge: Deon Lawrence • Back judge: H. Wittelsberger • Field judge: Harry Tyson • Side judge: Tony Tarantini • Center judge: James Cole
- TV announcers (ABC): Mike Patrick, Ed Cunningham, Jerry Punch
- Notre Dame vs Virginia (Sep 12, 2015)

Game information

First Quarter

- Notre Dame – Durham Smythe 7-yard pass from DeShone Kizer (two-point conversion failed)
- Notre Dame – Justin Yoon 32-yard field goal
- Notre Dame – Yoon 45-yard field goal

Second Quarter

- Virginia – Evan Butts 2-yard pass from Matt Johns (Ian Frye kick)
- Virginia – Keeon Johnson 42-yard pass from Johns (Frye kick)

Third Quarter

- Notre Dame – Will Fuller 59-yard pass from Malik Zaire (Yoon kick)
- Notre Dame – C. J. Prosise 24-yard rush (Yoon kick)

Fourth Quarter

- Virginia – Johns 4-yard rush (Frye kick)
- Virginia – Albert Reid 1-yard rush (two-point conversion failed)
- Notre Dame – Fuller 39-yard pass from Kizer (Torii Hunter Jr. pass from Kiser for two-point conversion)

Top Passers

- Notre Dame – DeShone Kizer, 8/12, 92 yards, 2 TD
- Virginia – Matt Johns, 26/38, 289 yards, 2 TD

Top Rushers

- Notre Dame – C. J. Prosise, 17 carries / 155 yards, 1 TD
- Virginia – Taquan Mizzell, 18 carries / 66 yards

Top Receiving

- Notre Dame – Will Fuller, 5 receptions / 124 yards, 2 TD
- Virginia – Canaan Severin, 11 receptions / 153 yards

Top Tackler

- Notre Dame – Jaylon Smith, 11 tackles
- Virginia – Kelvin Rainey, Quin Blanding, Mike Moore (tied), 8 tackles

=== William & Mary ===
William & Mary Tribe vs Virginia Cavaliers

Quarter	1	2	3	4	Total
William & Mary	7	13	0	9	29
Virginia	7	14	14	0	35

at Scott Stadium • Charlottesville, Virginia

- Date: September 19, 2015
- Game time: 3:30 p.m. EDT
- Game weather: Temperature: 85 °F (29 °C) • Wind: S 11 mph • Weather: Sunny
- Game attendance: 41,881
- Referee: Penn Wagers • Umpire: Troy Riley • Linesman: John Hoffmann • Line judge: Jeff Jones • Back judge: Gary Dancewicz • Field judge: Billy Beckett • Side judge: George Liotus • Center judge: Larry Hayes
- TV announcers (ESPN3): Shawn Kenney, Stan Lewter
- William & Mary vs Virginia (Sep 19, 2015)

Game information

First Quarter

- William & Mary – DeVonte Dedmon 41-yard pass from Steve Cluley (Nick Dorka kick)
- Virginia – Connor Wingo-Reeves 3-yard pass from Matt Johns (Ian Frye kick)

Second Quarter

- William & Mary – Andrew Caskin 37-yard pass from Cluley (Dorka kick)
- William & Mary – Dorka 43-yard field goal
- Virginia – Jordan Ellis 39-yard rush (Frye kick)
- William & Mary – Dorka 21-yard field goal
- Virginia – Canaan Severin 26 yard pass from Johns (Frye kick)

Third Quarter

- Virginia – Taquan Mizzell 80 yard pass from Johns (Frye kick)
- Virginia – Maurice Canady 74-yard punt return (Frye kick)

Fourth Quarter

- William & Mary – Safety
- William & Mary – Dedmon 9 yard pass from Cluley (Dorka kick)

Top Passers

- William & Mary – Steve Cluley, 23/36, 226 yards, 3 TD
- Virginia – Matt Johns, 13/22, 154 yards, 3 TD, 2 INT

Top Rushers

- William & Mary – Mikal Abdul-Saboor, 22 carries / 100 yards
- Virginia – Jordan Ellis, 5 carries / 50 yards, 1 TD

Top Receiving

- William & Mary – DeVonte Dedmon, 7 receptions / 22 yards
- Virginia – Taquan Mizzell, 5 receptions / 123 yards, 1 TD

Top Tackler

- William & Mary – DeAndre Houston-Carson, 9 tackles
- Virginia – Micah Kiser, 15 tackles

=== Boise State ===
Boise State Broncos vs Virginia Cavaliers

Quarter	1	2	3	4	Total
Boise State	17	12	17	10	56
Virginia	7	7	0	0	14

at Scott Stadium • Charlottesville, Virginia

- Date: September 25, 2015
- Game time: 8:00 p.m. EDT
- Game weather: Temperature: 67 °F (19 °C) • Wind: NNE 11 mph • Weather: Light Rain
- Game attendance: 42,427
- Referee: Reggie Smith • Umpire: Joel Bellinger • Linesman: Mike Moeller • Line judge: Mark Stewart • Back judge: Lyndon Nixon • Field judge: Matt Mills • Side judge: Tim Murray • Center judge: Dan Scanlan
- TV announcers (ESPN): Dave Flemming, Mack Brown, Allison Williams
- Boise State vs Virginia (Sep 25, 2015)

Game information

First Quarter

- Boise State – Justin Taimatuia 21-yard interception return (Tyler Rausa kick)
- Boise State – Jeremy McNichols 2-yard rush (Rausa kick)
- Boise State – Rausa 51-yard field goal
- Virginia – T.J. Thorpe 75-yard pass from Johns (Ian Frye kick)

Second Quarter

- Boise State – McNichols 10-yard pass from Brett Rypien (Rausa kick)
- Boise State – Team Safety
- Boise State – Rausa 30-yard field goal
- Virginia – Taquan Mizzell 45-yard pass from Johns (Frye kick)

Third Quarter

- Boise State – Rausa 39-yard field goal
- Boise State – Thomas Sperbeck 30-yard pass from Rypien (Rausa kick)
- Boise State – Mercy Maston 25-yard interception return (Rausa kick)

Fourth Quarter

- Boise State – Rausa 45-yard field goal
- Boise State – Thomas Sperbeck 64-yard pass from Rypien (Rausa kick)

Top Passers

- Boise State – Brett Rypien, 24/35, 321 yards, 3 TD
- Virginia – Matt Johns, 12/25, 199 yards, 2 TD, 3 INT

Top Rushers

- Boise State – Jeremy McNichols, 9 carries / 69 yards, 1 TD
- Virginia – Daniel Hamm, 8 carries / 22 yards

Top Receiving

- Boise State – Thomas Sperbeck, 5 receptions / 121 yards, 2 TD
- Virginia – Taquan Mizzell, 5 receptions / 59 yards, 1 TD

Top Tackler

- Boise State – Ben Weaver, 9 tackles
- Virginia – Zach Bradshaw, 10 tackles

=== Pittsburgh ===
Virginia Cavaliers vs Pittsburgh Panthers

Quarter	1	2	3	4	Total
Virginia	3	7	3	6	19
Pittsburgh	17	0	7	2	26

at Heinz Field • Pittsburgh, Pennsylvania

- Date: October 10, 2015
- Game time: 12:30 p.m. EDT
- Game weather: Temperature: 56 °F (13 °C) • Wind: NE 4 mph • Weather: Sunny
- Game attendance: 45,237
- Referee: D. Heydt • Umpire: D. Worrell • Linesman: M. Pavese • Line judge: A. Andrick • Back judge: R. Luklan • Field judge: J. Biddle • Side judge: A. Bartis • Center judge: L. Hayes
- TV announcers (ACCN): Tim Brant, Dave Archer, Larry Richert
- Virginia vs Pittsburgh (Oct 10, 2015)

Game information

First Quarter

- Pittsburgh – Scott Orndoff 37-yard pass from Nathan Peterman (Chris Blewitt kick)
- Virginia – Ian Frye 33-yard field goal
- Pittsburgh – Qadree Ollison 4-yard run (Blewitt kick)
- Pittsburgh – Blewitt 33-yard field goal

Second Quarter

- Virginia – Kwontie Moore 15-yard fumble recovery (Frye kick)

Third Quarter

- Pittsburgh – Tyler Boyd 8-yard pass from Peterman (Blewitt kick)
- Virginia – Frye 26-yard field goal

Fourth Quarter

- Pittsburgh – Mike Caprara Safety
- Virginia – Canaan Severin 32-yard pass from Matt Johns (Frye kick blocked)

Top Passer

- Virginia – Matt Johns, 17/33, 209 yards, 1 TD, 1 INT
- Pittsburgh – Nathan Peterman, 17/24, 222 yards, 2 TD

Top Rusher

- Virginia – Albert Reid, 4 carries / 74 yards
- Pittsburgh – Chris James, 11 carries / 94 yards

Top Receiving

- Virginia – T.J. Thorpe, 5 receptions / 75 yards
- Pittsburgh – Tyler Boyd, 7 receptions / 54 yards, 1 TD

Top Tackler

- Virginia – Micah Kiser, 11 tackles
- Pittsburgh – Jordan Whitehead, 12 tackles

=== Syracuse ===
Syracuse Orange vs Virginia Cavaliers

Quarter	1	2	3	4	OT	2OT	3OT	Total
Syracuse	0	21	3	0	7	7	0	38
Virginia	0	14	0	10	7	7	6	44

at Scott Stadium • Charlottesville, Virginia

- Date: October 17, 2015
- Game time: 3:30 p.m. EDT
- Game weather: Temperature: 61 °F (16 °C) • Wind: WNW 7 mph • Weather: Sunny
- Game attendance: 39,223
- Referee: Riley Johnson • Umpire: Danny Worrell • Linesman: Kavin McGrath • Line judge: Tim Graham • Back judge: Barry Hendon • Field judge: C. Clougherty • Side judge: Mike Safrit • Center judge: Steve Disangro
- TV announcers (ACCRSN): Tom Werme, Ovie Mughelli, Niki Noto
- Syracuse vs Virginia (Oct 17, 2015)

Game information

First Quarter

- No Scoring

Second Quarter

- Syracuse – Antwan Cordy 44-yard fumble recovery (Cole Murphy kick)
- Virginia – Taquan Mizzell 11-yard run (Ian Frye kick)
- Virginia – Wilfred Wahee 32-yard fumble recovery (Frye kick)
- Syracuse – Jordan Fredericks 1-yard run (Murphy kick)
- Syracuse – Eric Dungey 26-yard run (Murphy kick)

Third Quarter

- Syracuse – Murphy 22-yard field goal

Fourth Quarter

- Virginia – Charlie Hopkins 2-yard pass from Matt Johns (Frye kick)
- Virginia – Frye 25-yard field goal

Overtime

- Syracuse – Ervin Philips 7-yard pass from Eric Dungey (Murphy kick)
- Virginia – Canaan Severin 36-yard pass from Matt Johns (Frye kick)
- Virginia – Mizzell 13-yard run (Frye kick)
- Syracuse – Steve Ishmael 12-yard pass from Eric Dungey (Murphy kick)
- Virginia – Jordan Ellis 3-yard run

Top Passer

- Syracuse – Eric Dungey, 16/22, 150 yards, 2 TD
- Virginia – Matt Johns, 24/37, 234 yards, 2 TD, 1 INT

Top Rusher

- Syracuse – Eric Dungey, 18 carries / 85 yards, 1 TD
- Virginia – Taquan Mizzell, 13 carries / 58 yards, 2 TD

Top Receiving

- Syracuse – Steve Ishmael, 4 receptions / 40 yards, 1 TD
- Virginia – Taquan Mizzell, 10 receptions / 69 yards

Top Tackler

- Syracuse – Paris Bennett, 13 tackles
- Virginia – Quin Blanding, 12 tackles

=== North Carolina ===
120th South's Oldest Rivalry Game: Virginia Cavaliers vs North Carolina Tar Heels

Quarter	1	2	3	4	Total
Virginia	10	3	0	0	13
North Carolina	7	6	3	10	26

at Kenan Memorial Stadium • Chapel Hill, North Carolina

- Date: October 24, 2015
- Game time: 3:30 p.m. EST
- Game weather: 71 °F (22 °C) • Wind: SSE 4 • Weather: Mostly Sunny
- Game attendance: 52,000
- Referee: David Epperly • Umpire: Troy Riley • Linesman: Steve Clein • Line judge: Robert Zivkovic • Back judge: Pat Ryan • Field judge: Chris Junjulas • Side judge: Angie Bartis • Center judge: Mike Webster
- TV announcers (ACCRSN): Wes Durham, James Bates, Jen Hildreth
- Virginia vs North Carolina (Oct 24, 2015)

Game information

First Quarter

- Virginia – Ian Frye 35-yard field goal
- North Carolina – T. J. Logan 16-yard run (Nick Weiler kick)
- Virginia – Charlie Hopkins 1-yard pass from Matt Johns (Frye kick)

Second Quarter

- North Carolina – Elijah Hood 3-yard run (Joey Mangili pass failed)
- Virginia – Frye 26-yard field goal

Third Quarter

- North Carolina – Weiler 29-yard field goal

Fourth Quarter

- North Carolina – Hood 3-yard run (Nick Weiler kick)
- North Carolina – Weiler 37-yard field goal

Top Passer

- Virginia – Matt Johns, 17/30, 148 yards, 1 TD, 4 INT
- North Carolina – Marquise Williams, 21/26, 226 yards, 1 INT

Top Rusher

- Virginia – Taquan Mizzell, 24 carries / 117 yards
- North Carolina – Elijah Hood, 21 carries / 101 yards, 2 TD

Top Receiving

- Virginia – Taquan Mizzell, 6 receptions / 57 yards
- North Carolina – Quinshad Davis, 6 receptions / 40 yards

Top Tackler

- Virginia – Quin Blanding, 12 tackles
- North Carolina – Shakeel Rashad, 10 tackles

=== Georgia Tech ===
Georgia Tech Yellow Jackets vs Virginia Cavaliers

Quarter	1	2	3	4	Total
Georgia Tech	7	7	0	7	21
Virginia	10	0	10	7	27

at Scott Stadium • Charlottesville, Virginia

- Date: October 31, 2015
- Game time: 3:00 p.m. EST
- Game weather: 58 °F (14 °C) • Wind: S 9 • Weather: Overcast
- Game attendance: 32,308
- Referee: Duane Heydt • Umpire: Rich McMahan • Linesman: Arthur Hardin • Line judge: Robert Bassett • Back judge: Paul Vargo • Field judge: Kip Johnson • Side judge: D. Harrison • Center judge: Steve Disangro
- TV announcers (ACCRSN): Wes Durham, James Bates, Niki Noto
- Virginia vs Georgia Tech (Oct 31, 2015)

Game information

First Quarter

- Virginia – Ian Frye 19-yard field goal
- Georgia Tech – Clinton Lynch 49-yard run (Harrison Butker kick)
- Virginia – Daniel Hamm 4-yard run (Frye kick)

Second Quarter

- Georgia Tech – Lynch 42-yard pass from Justin Thomas (Butker kick)

Third Quarter

- Virginia – Frye 24-yard field goal
- Virginia – Canaan Severin 30 yard pass from Matt Johns (Frye kick)

Fourth Quarter

- Virginia – Albert Reed 35-yard run (Frye kick)
- Georgia Tech – Lynch 38-yard pass from Thomas (Butker kick)

Top Passer

- Georgia Tech – Justin Thomas, 13/31, 251 yards, 2 TD
- Virginia – Matt Johns, 17/28, 175 yards, 1 TD, 1 INT

Top Rusher

- Georgia Tech – Clinton Lynch, 3 carries / 63 yards, 1 TD
- Virginia – Taquan Mizzell, 14 carries / 75 yards

Top Receiving

- Georgia Tech – Ricky Jeune, 5 receptions / 103 yards
- Virginia – Taquan Mizzell, 5 receptions / 33 yards

Top Tackler

- Georgia Tech – Jamal Golden, 9 tackles, 2 breakups
- Virginia – Quin Blanding, 15 tackles

=== Miami (FL) ===
Virginia Cavaliers vs Miami Hurricanes

Quarter	1	2	3	4	Total
Virginia	0	8	7	6	21
Miami (FL)	0	14	3	10	27

at Sun Life Stadium • Miami Gardens, Florida

- Date: November 7, 2015
- Game time: 3:00 p.m. EST
- Game weather: 85 °F (29 °C) • Wind: SE 15 • Weather: Partly Sunny
- Game attendance: 40,963
- Referee: Gary Patterson • Umpire: Mike Morton • Linesman: John Hoffmann • Line judge: Jeff Jones • Back judge: Gary Dancewicz • Field judge: Billy Beckett • Side judge: George Liotus • Center judge: Larry Hayes
- TV announcers (ACCRSN): Wes Durham, James Bates, Jenn Hildreth
- Virginia vs Miami (FL) (Nov 7, 2015)

Game information

First Quarter

- No Scoring

Second Quarter

- Miami – David Njoku 5-yard pass from Brad Kaaya (Michael Badgley kick)
- Virginia – Team Safety
- Virginia – Ian Frye 25-yard field goal
- Miami – Stacy Coley 67-yard pass from Kaaya (Badgley kick)
- Virginia – Frye 48-yard field goal

Third Quarter

- Virginia – Olamide Zaccheaus 3-yard run (Frye kick)
- Miami – Badgley 28-yard field goal

Fourth Quarter

- Miami – Mark Walton 1-yard run (Badgley kick)
- Virginia – Frye 36-yard field goal
- Miami – Badgley 39-yard field goal
- Virginia – Frye 47-yard field goal

Top Passer

- Virginia – Matt Johns, 29/42, 280 yards, 1 INT
- Miami (FL) – Brad Kaaya, 20/26, 286 yards, 2 TD, 1 INT

Top Rusher

- Virginia – Taquan Mizzell, 18 carries / 91 yards
- Miami (FL) – Joseph Yearby, 17 carries / 78 yards

Top Receiving

- Virginia – Taquan Mizzell, 8 receptions / 40 yards
- Miami (FL) – Stacy Coley, 7 receptions / 132 yards, 1 TD

Top Tackler

- Virginia – David Dean, 9 tackles
- Miami (FL) – Jermaine Grace, 8 tackles

=== Louisville ===
Virginia Cavaliers vs Louisville Cardinals

Quarter	1	2	3	4	Total
Virginia	7	10	0	14	31
Louisville	3	14	7	14	38

at Papa John's Cardinal Stadium • Louisville, Kentucky

- Date: November 14, 2015
- Game time: 12:30 p.m. EST
- Game weather: 53 °F (12 °C) • Wind: SSW 4 • Weather: Sunny
- Game attendance: 51,233
- Referee: J. Heaser • Umpire: M. Wooten • Linesman: J. Griesser • Line judge: R. Misner • Back judge: J. Hooper • Field judge: M. Cullin • Side judge: J. Hocker • Center judge: M. Geier
- TV announcers (ACCRSN): Wes Durham, James Bates, Jenn Hildredth
- Virginia vs Louisville (Nov 14, 2015)

Game information

First Quarter

- Virginia – Evan Butts 2-yard pass from Matt Johns (Ian Frye kick)
- Louisville – John Wallace 20-yard field goal

Second Quarter

- Louisville – Jaylen Smith 20-yard pass from Reggie Bonnafon (Wallace kick)
- Virginia – Canaan Severin 30-yard pass from Johns (Frye kick)
- Louisville – Cole Hikutini 21-yard pass from Kyle Bolin (Wallace kick)
- Virginia – Ian Frye 46-yard field goal

Third Quarter

- Louisville – Brandon Radcliff 9-yard run (Wallace kick)

Fourth Quarter

- Virginia – Severin 23-yard pass from Johns (Frye kick)
- Louisville – L. J. Scott 1-yard run (Wallace kick)
- Louisville – Radcliff 36-yard run (Wallace kick)
- Virginia – Severin 16-yard pass from Johns (Frye kick)

Top Passer

- Virginia – Matt Johns, 25/41, 260 yards, 4 TD
- Louisville – Kyle Bolin, 10/21, 139 yards, 1 TD

Top Rusher

- Virginia – Taquan Mizzell, 13 carries / 47 yards
- Louisville – Brandon Radcliff, 21 carries / 146 yards, 2 TD

Top Receiving

- Virginia – Taquan Mizzell, 9 receptions / 89 yards
- Louisville – Cole Hikutini, 4 receptions / 59 yards, 1 TD

Top Tackler

- Virginia – Quin Blanding, 14 tackles
- Louisville – Keith Kelsey, 14 tackles

=== Duke ===
Duke Blue Devils vs Virginia Cavaliers

Quarter	1	2	3	4	Total
Duke	7	6	7	14	34
Virginia	21	7	14	0	42

at Scott Stadium • Charlottesville, Virginia

- Date: November 21, 2015
- Game time: 3:30 p.m. EST
- Game weather: 53 °F (12 °C) • Wind: S 8 • Weather: Sunny
- Game attendance: 35,178
- Referee: Stuart Mullins • Umpire: Johnnie Forte • Linesman: Mike Pavese • Line judge: Danny Short • Back judge: Delbert Bell • Field judge: Tom Potts • Side judge: Jim Corpora • Center judge: David Goodwin
- TV announcers (ESPN3): Michael Raeghi, Tom O'Brien
- Virginia vs Duke (Nov 21, 2015)

Game information

First Quarter

- Virginia – Evan Butts 15-yard pass from Olamide Zaccheaus (Ian Frye kick)
- Virginia – T. J. Thorpe 26-yard run (Frye kick)
- Virginia – Taquan Mizzell 3-yard run (Frye kick)
- Duke – DeVon Edwards 94-yard kickoff return (Ross Martin kick)

Second Quarter

- Duke – Martin 36-yard field goal
- Virginia – Mizzell 36-yard pass from Matt Johns (Frye kick)
- Duke – Martin 42-yard field goal

Third Quarter

- Virginia – Mizzell 10-yard run (Frye kick)
- Duke – Braxton Deaver 7-yard pass from Thomas Sirk (Martin kick)
- Virginia – Zaccheaus 50-yard pass from Johns (Frye kick)

Fourth Quarter

- Duke – T. J. Rahming 12-yard pass from Parker Boehme (Martin kick)
- Duke – Boehme 1-yard run (Martin kick)

Top Passer

- Duke – Thomas Sirk, 22/34, 208 yards, 1 TD
- Virginia – Matt Johns, 24/33, 344 yards, 2 TD, 1 INT

Top Rusher

- Duke – Thomas Sirk, 14 carries / 36 yards
- Virginia – Taquan Mizzell, 17 carries / 61 yards, 2 TD

Top Receiving

- Duke – T. J. Rahming, 12 receptions / 190 yards, 1 TD
- Virginia – T. J. Thorpe, 5 receptions / 58 yards

Top Tackler

- Duke – Dwayne Norman, 8 tackles
- Virginia – Micah Kiser, 17 tackles

=== Virginia Tech ===
97th Battle for the Commonwealth Cup: Virginia Tech Hokies vs Virginia Cavaliers

Quarter	1	2	3	4	Total
Virginia Tech	3	3	0	17	23
Virginia	3	3	7	7	20

at Scott Stadium • Charlottesville, Virginia

- Date: November 28, 2015
- Game time: 12:00 p.m. EST
- Game weather: 67 °F (19 °C) • Wind: NW 2 • Weather: Mostly Cloudy
- Game attendance: 53,777
- Referee: Jeff Flanagan • Umpire: Mike Morton • Linesman: Matt Fitzgerald • Line judge: Hugh Campbell • Back judge: Bryan Platt • Field judge: Mark Furtado • Side judge: Glenn Street • Center judge: Steve Disangro
- TV announcers (ESPNU): Clay Matvick, John Congemi, Marty Smith
- Virginia vs Virginia Tech (Nov 28, 2015)

Game information

First Quarter

- Virginia Tech – Joey Slye 48-yard field goal
- Virginia – Ian Frye 42-yard field goal

Second Quarter

- Virginia – Frye 42-yard field goal
- Virginia Tech – Slye 44-yard field goal

Third Quarter

- Virginia – Albert Reid 57-yard run (Frye kick)

Fourth Quarter

- Virginia Tech – Sam Rogers 3-yard pass from Michael Brewer (Slye kick)
- Virginia – Canaan Severin 27-yard pass from Matt Johns (Frye kick)
- Virginia Tech – Isaiah Ford 32-yard pass from Michael Brewer (Slye kick)
- Virginia Tech – Slye 41-yard field goal

Top Passer

- Virginia Tech – Michael Brewer, 15/29, 237 yards, 2 TD, 1 INT
- Virginia – Matt Johns, 18/38, 171 yards, 1 TD, 2 INT

Top Rusher

- Virginia Tech – Travon McMillian, 18 carries / 81 yards
- Virginia – Albert Reid, 9 carries / 103 yards, 1 TD

Top Receiving

- Virginia Tech – Isaiah Ford, 6 receptions / 121 yards, 1 TD
- Virginia – Taquan Mizzell, 7 receptions / 50 yards

Top Tackler

- Virginia Tech – Chuck Clark, 12 tackles
- Virginia – Micah Kiser, 10 tackles
