= 2015 Sun Bowl =

American college football game

2015 Hyundai Sun Bowl
- 82nd Sun Bowl
Miami Hurricanes	Washington State Cougars
(8–4)	(8–4)
ACC	Pac-12
14	20
Head coach: Larry Scott	Head coach: Mike Leach
	1	2	3	4	Total
Miami	7	0	0	7	14
Washington State	7	13	0	0	20
- Date: December 26, 2015
- Season: 2015
- Stadium: Sun Bowl
- Location: El Paso, Texas
- MVP: Luke Falk
- Favorite: Wash. State by 3
- Referee: Jerry McGinn (Big Ten)
- Attendance: 41,180
- Payout: US$TBD

United States TV coverage
- Network: CBS/Sports USA
- Announcers: Carter Blackburn, Gary Danielson, & Allie LaForce (CBS); John Ahlers, Doug Plank, & Scott Colletti (Sports USA)

The 2015 Sun Bowl was a post-season American college football bowl game played on December 26, 2015, at the Sun Bowl Stadium in El Paso, Texas. Played under snowy conditions, it marked the first time the game was played in snowy weather since the 1987 Christmas Day game with West Virginia and Oklahoma State. The 82nd edition of the Sun Bowl featured the Miami Hurricanes of the Atlantic Coast Conference against the Washington State Cougars of the Pac-12 Conference. It began at noon MST and aired on CBS. It was one of the 2015–16 bowl games that concluded the 2015 FBS football season. Sponsored by South Korean automotive manufacturer Hyundai Motor Company's American subsidiary, the game was officially known as the Hyundai Sun Bowl. Washington State won 20–14 over the University of Miami.

== Teams ==
The game featured the Miami Hurricanes against the Washington State Cougars.

=== Miami Hurricanes ===
The Hurricanes finished 3rd in the ACC Coastal Division. After finishing their regular season 8–4, bowl director Bernie Olivas extended an invitation for the Hurricanes to play in the game, which they accepted.

This was the Hurricanes' second Sun Bowl; they had previously played in the 2010 Sun Bowl, losing to Notre Dame by a score of 33–17.

=== Washington State Cougars ===
The Cougars finished 3rd in the Pac-12 North Division. After finishing their regular season 8–4, Olivas extended an invitation for the Cougars to play in the game, which they accepted as well.

This was the Cougars' second Sun Bowl; they had previously won the 2001 Sun Bowl over Purdue by a score of 33–27.

== Game summary ==
=== Scoring summary ===
Scoring summary

Quarter	Time	Drive			Team	Scoring information	Score	
Quarter	Time	Plays	Yards	TOP	Team	Scoring information	UM	WSU
1	12:41	6	75	2:19	WSU	Jamal Morrow 31-yard touchdown reception from Luke Falk, Erik Powell kick good	0	7
1	5:45	15	69	6:56	UM	Stacy Coley 4-yard touchdown reception from Brad Kaaya, Michael Badgley kick good	7	7
2	6:33	14	58	6:33	WSU	30-yard field goal by Erik Powell	7	10
2	1:10	8	71	2:32	WSU	Gabe Marks 25-yard touchdown reception from Luke Falk, Erik Powell kick good	7	17
2	0:00	4	34	0:26	WSU	25-yard field goal by Erik Powell	7	20
4	13:10	2	65	0:33	UM	Mark Walton 5-yard touchdown run, Michael Badgley kick good	14	20
"TOP" = time of possession. For other American football terms, see Glossary of American football.							14	20

=== Statistics ===
Statistics	MIA	WSU
First downs	13	23
Plays–yards	62–344	78–382
Rushes–yards	30–125	25–87
Passing yards	219	295
Passing Comp–Att–Int	17–32–2	29–53–0
Time of possession	28:55	31:05
