= 2013 Russell Athletic Bowl =

American college football game

Miami Hurricanes	Louisville Cardinals
(9–3)	(11–1)
ACC	The American
9	36
Head coach: Al Golden	Head coach: Charlie Strong
Coaches 25	AP / Coaches / BCS; 18 / 16 / 18
	1	2	3	4	Total
Miami	2	0	0	7	9
Louisville	6	16	7	7	36
- Date: December 28, 2013
- Season: 2013
- Stadium: Florida Citrus Bowl
- Location: Orlando, Florida
- MVP: Teddy Bridgewater
- Favorite: Louisville by 3
- Referee: Mike Cannon (Big Ten)
- Attendance: 51,098
- Payout: US$2,275,000

United States TV coverage
- Network: ESPN
- Announcers: TV: Bob Wischusen (play-by-play), Rod Gilmore (analyst), Quint Kessenich (sideline); Radio: Dave LaMont (play-by-play), Anthony Becht (analyst), Brooke Weisbrod (sideline)
- Nielsen ratings: 3.6

The 2013 Russell Athletic Bowl was an American college football bowl game that was played on December 28, 2013, at the Florida Citrus Bowl Stadium in Orlando, Florida. It was one of the 2013–14 bowl games that concluded the 2013 FBS football season. The 24th edition of the Russell Athletic Bowl, it featured the Miami Hurricanes of the Atlantic Coast Conference (which Louisville will join in 2014) against the Louisville Cardinals of the American Athletic Conference. It began at 6:45 p.m. EST and aired on ESPN. The game was sponsored by the Russell Athletic uniform company. Louisville defeated Miami by a score of 36–9.

The Cardinals had a regular season record of 11–1 (7–1 American). The Hurricanes finished their season at 9–3 (5–3 ACC).

== Teams ==
The game featured the Miami Hurricanes against the Louisville Cardinals.

=== Miami ===
The Russell Athletic Bowl chose Miami as its ACC representative. The Hurricanes started 7–0 and were ranked as high as #7 in the AP Poll. However, a three-game losing streak knocked them out of the polls and ultimately derailed their ACC title hopes. Although Louisville and Miami will be conference rivals starting in 2014, the teams will be in opposite divisions for football, and will not meet every year. Miami's protected cross-division rival is Florida State and Louisville's will be Virginia. Miami had self-imposed bowl bans each of the previous two seasons due to an NCAA investigation. The final sanctions ultimately did not include a bowl ban for 2013.

==== Offense ====
James Coley was the Hurricanes' offensive coordinator, and guided the offense throughout the season, during which it averaged 274.3 passing yards per game (29th in FBS), 172.5 rushing yards per game (63rd in FBS), and 35.9 points per game (25th in FBS). The Canes' offense featured third team all-conference honoree senior Stephen Morris at quarterback; he totaled 2868 passing yards, 21 touchdowns, and 12 interceptions during the season. A pair of sophomore running backs led the rushing attack, however one would not play in the bowl game – sophomore Duke Johnson, who rushed for a total of 920 yards and 6 touchdowns during the season en route to second team all-conference achievement, broke his ankle in Miami's game against Florida State and subsequently underwent surgery, which prevented his participation in the bowl game, and in his absence, sophomore Dallas Crawford picked up the slack, and in total, recorded 523 rushing yards and 12 touchdowns during the season. Freshman Gus Edwards also contributed, totaling 300 rushing yards and 4 touchdowns.

Miami's leading receiver was senior Allen Hurns, a second team all-conference honoree, who recorded 60 receptions, exceeded 1,000 yards, and totaled 6 touchdowns on the season. Freshman Stacy Coley was second on the team in receptions with 30, and led the team with 7 receiving touchdowns. Sophomore Herb Waters and junior Philip Dorsett also contributed wide receiver, and junior Clive Walford contributed at tight end, catching 30 passes including 2 touchdowns. Three Miami offensive linemen achieved all-conference honors, with senior guard Brandon Linder achieving second team accolades, and senior tackle Seantrel Henderson and junior center Shane McDermott achieving third team recognition. The other starters on the line were sophomore Ereck Flowers at left tackle and junior Jon Feliciano predominantly at left guard (he made two starts at right tackle), both of whom started all 12 games. Sophomore Matt Goudis handled the kicking responsibilities, making 13 of his 17 field goal tries with a long of 49 yards, and making all 56 extra point attempts.

==== Defense ====
Coached by Mark D'Onofrio, Miami's assistant head coach and defensive coordinator, the Hurricanes' 4-3 defense was in the top half of FBS teams in terms of points allowed (averaged 26 per game), and was in the middle of the pack in terms of yards allowed (averaged 415.8 per game). The unit was anchored by first team all-conference honoree Denzel Perryman, who totaled 104 tackles including 5 TFL and 1.5 sacks. Joining Perryman in the linebacking corps was Jimmy Gaines, who was second on the defense with 76 tackles. Other contributors included Tyrone Cornelius and Thurston Armbrister, each of whom started five games, and Tyriq McCord, whose four sacks led the team. On the defensive line, junior Anthony Chickillo started every game at defensive end, and totaled 44 total tackles (tied for fourth on the team), 7.5 TFL (second on the team), and 3.5 sacks (tied for second on the team). Senior Shayon Green started all 12 games opposite Chickillo, and recorded 63 tackles, 10.5 TFL (led the team), and 3 sacks. In the middle at tackle, however, there was more variance, as a total of four different players started games. Junior Olsen Pierre started 11 of the 12 games on the inside, recording a total of 29 tackles and 1 each TFL and sack. Senior Luther Robinson backed up Pierre in all 12 games (earning one start), and recorded a fumble recovery as well as 23 tackles. At the other tackle spot, senior Curtis Porter started seven games (though played in all 12) and recorded 23 total tackles, 3 TFL, 1 forced fumble (FF), and 1 fumble recovery (FR), and 6 feet 6 inches (1.98 m) 310 pounds (140 kg) Virginia-transfer Justin Renfrow, a senior, started five games, and totaled 36 tackles and 1 FF.

In the secondary, despite starting only two games, sophomore Deon Bush earned honorable mention all-conference accolades from the Atlantic Conference Sports Media Association; he totaled 24 tackles and recorded 1 each TFL, sack, and interception. Sophomore cornerback Tracy Howard also earned such recognition, recording 32 tackles and 4 interceptions on the season. The predominant starter at cornerback opposite Howard was junior Ladarius Gunter, whose 40 tackles placed him sixth on the team, and whose 3 interceptions were second on the team. Several players started at safety throughout the season; in the team's final game, however, the two starters were senior A. J. Highsmith and sophomore Rayshawn Jenkins ... earlier in the season, senior Kacy Rodgers II and Bush started games. All four saw regular playing time throughout the season.

=== Louisville ===
After the previous season saw the Cardinals score an upset victory in the Sugar Bowl against the Florida Gators by a score of 33–23, expectations were enormous heading into the next season, especially with the massive conference upheaval leading to the Big East Conference's transformation into the American Athletic Conference. While the Cardinals once again played an outstanding season, finishing at 11–1 overall and 7–1 in the American, one loss kept the Cardinals from a return trip to the BCS; that loss being a 38–35 home defeat at the hands of the UCF Knights on Friday, October 18. After a 31–24 overtime victory on the road against the rival Cincinnati Bearcats to claim The Keg of Nails, Florida Citrus Sports CEO Steve Hogan extended an invitation to play in the game. In addition to being Louisville's first Russell Athletic Bowl, this will also be the Cardinals' final game as a member of the American Athletic Conference before moving to the Atlantic Coast Conference for 2014 and will serve as a preview for future conference play, given their opponent already plays in the ACC. It will also be the final Russell Athletic Bowl to be a tie-in for the American Athletic Conference, as that tie-in will go to the Big 12 Conference from 2014 through at least 2019.

==== Offense ====
Offensive coordinator Shawn Watson was in charge of the Cardinals' offense that averaged 35.1 points per game, which on the field was led by star junior quarterback Teddy Bridgewater, a potential top-10 pick in the 2014 NFL draft, should he decide to forgo his senior year. During the season, he totaled 3,523 with 28 touchdowns and only 4 interceptions, the second lowest interception total amongst the top-10 passers in terms of yardage in the country. In contrast to the Cardinals' strong passing game, they were a mediocre rushing team, rushing for just 150.2 yards per game. Their rushing attack was led by a complement of backs, including Dominique Brown, a 6 feet 2 inches (1.88 m) bruising junior who totaled 783 rushing yards and 8 touchdowns, and Senorise Perry, a smaller inconsistent speedster who entered the season the starter, but ultimately averaged 4.7 yards per carry and totaled 631 yards and 6 touchdowns recording fewer carries than Brown. Early in the season, Auburn-transfer Michael Dyer contributed in the rushing game, but subsequently sustained a groin and hip injury that nagged the remainder of the season, during which he did not play.

The receiving game featured three players – all wide receivers – with over 40 catches. They were junior DeVante Parker, who from his 6 feet 3 inches (1.91 m) frame caught 46 passes for 743 yards and 11 touchdowns, the latter two of which led the team, senior Damian Copeland, who led the team with 52 receptions and gained 690 yards scoring five touchdowns, and senior Eli Rogers, who from a small stature (5 feet 10 inches (1.78 m)) caught 41 passes for 498 yards. Other contributing wide receivers included juniors Kai De La Cruz and Robert Clark, who combined for 38 receptions, 480 yards, and 4 touchdowns. Complementing the wide receivers were two tight ends – junior Gerald Christian, who caught 26 passes for 401 yards and 4 touchdowns during the season, and senior Ryan Hubbell, who caught 14 passes for 236 yards during the season. The majority of the kicking duties (though he was listed as both a kicker and punter on the official team roster) were handled by sophomore John Wallace, who succeeded on 81% of his field goal tries during the season with a long of 39; he scored a total of 100 points adding 49/50 extra point tries. The Cardinals' offensive line entered the season needing to replace players who had totaled a combined 73 starts, but returning three juniors expected to contribute – Jake Smith, John Miller, and Jamon Brown. In the last game of the season, the Cardinals started that trio at center, left guard, and left tackle respectively, while inserting senior Kamran Joyer and sophomore Ryan Mack on the right side at guard and tackle respectively. Though from time to time they struggled, Smith commented that they improved in each game.

==== Defense ====
Louisville's defense, which was coordinated by Vance Bedford, held opponents to 12.4 points per game, and recorded 39 total sacks, both of which were near the top of the NCAA. A strong defensive line contributed to the sack totals, and was led by senior end Marcus Smith, whose 12.5 sacks were top 10 nationally. Opposite him was junior end Lorenzo Mauldin, who recorded 9.5 sacks, which was top 20 nationally. In the middle at tackle, seniors Brandon Dunn and Roy Philon combined for 78 tackles, with Dunn recording 4.5 tackles for loss (TFL) and 1 sack, and Philon contributing 12 TFL and 4 sacks. Though that was the starting lineup for all 12 of the Cardinals' regular season games, sophomore end Sheldon Rankins also saw playing time, and made 15 tackles as well as 3 sacks. Louisville's linebackers were another strong group, although they did not feature the same starting lineup in each game like the defensive line. Senior middle linebacker Preston Brown led the defense with 91 tackles, adding 10.5 TFL, and 3.5 sacks. Supplementing his anchorage of the linebacking corps was sophomore weak side linebacker James Burgess, who was third on the team with 67 tackles, and added 7 TFL. Primarily starting on the strong side was former walk on George Durant, a redshirt senior who started only 7 games and earlier in the season was arrested for egregious speeding and charged with reckless driving as well as several other charges ... he ultimately entered the bowl game having amassed 15 tackles. Freshman Keith Kelsey provided depth at all three linebacker slots, and finished the season with 23 tackles.

Two veteran safeties – junior Calvin Pryor and senior Hakeem Smith – anchored the Cardinals' defensive backfield, starting a combined 23 of 24 possible times. Pryor was second on the defense with 69 tackles, was tied for third on the defense with 3 interceptions, and led the secondary with 5.5 TFL. Smith made 42 tackles, 2 TFL, 1 sack, and 3 interceptions. Terrell Floyd, a "solid" and physical player, led the cornerbacks, recording 4 interceptions and adding 45 total tackles. Starting opposite him was redshirt sophomore Charles Gaines, a converted wide receiver who also was a kick returner, led the team with 5 interceptions and was one of the defense's top playmakers. He supplanted fellow redshirt sophomore Jermaine Reve, who started early in the season, but upon being overtaken was relegated to an extra defensive back in passing situations and recorded 20 total tackles. Sophomore Gerod Holliman also contributed, primarily as a nickel back.

== Game summary ==
=== Scoring summary ===
Scoring summary

Quarter	Time	Drive			Team	Scoring information	Score	
Quarter	Time	Plays	Yards	TOP	Team	Scoring information	Miami	Louisville
1	11:51	-	-	-	Miami	Teddy Bridgewater tackled in end zone for a safety by Deon Bush	2	0
1	5:46	8	55	4:26	Louisville	36-yard field goal by John Wallace	2	3
1	1:38	4	18	2:18	Louisville	43-yard field goal by Wallace	2	6
2	12:47	7	57	2:51	Louisville	42-yard field goal by Wallace	2	9
2	7:10	8	80	4:01	Louisville	DeVante Parker 26-yard touchdown reception from Bridgewater, Wallace kick good	2	16
2	0:30	6	60	1:23	Louisville	Michaelee Harris 12-yard touchdown reception from Bridgewater, Wallace kick no good	2	22
3	8:11	11	85	6:49	Louisville	Senorise Perry 24-yard touchdown reception from Bridgewater, Wallace kick good	2	29
4	12:19	9	70	5:07	Louisville	Bridgewater 1-yard touchdown run, Wallace kick good	2	36
4	10:23	5	55	1:56	Miami	Gus Edwards 2-yard touchdown run, Matt Goudis kick good	9	36
"TOP" = time of possession. For other American football terms, see Glossary of American football.							Miami	Louisville
