= Louisville–Miami football rivalry =

American college football rivalry

- Louisville Cardinals Miami Hurricanes
- Sport: Football
- First meeting: November 11, 1933; Miami, 33–7
- Latest meeting: October 17, 2025; Louisville, 24–21
- Next meeting: 2027
- Trophy: Schnellenberger Trophy

Statistics
- Total meetings: 18
- All-time series: Miami leads, 12–5–1
- Trophy series: Louisville leads, 2–1
- Largest victory: Miami, 45–7 (1985)
- Longest win streak: Miami, 7 (1979–2004)
- Longest unbeaten streak: Miami, 10 (1933–2006)
- Current win streak: Louisville, 1 (2025–present)

Bowl history
- Louisville, 1–0 2013 Russell Athletic Bowl: Louisville, 36–9

Locations of Louisville and Miami

The Louisville–Miami football rivalry is an American college football rivalry between the Louisville Cardinals and Miami Hurricanes. Miami leads the all-time series, 12–5–1. Since 2023, the Schnellenberger Trophy is presented to the winner of the game.

The two teams had similar trajectories, with both programs spending decades as an independent before playing in the Big East and finally ending as member of the Atlantic Coast Conference (ACC).

== Series history ==
The two teams played each other on an inconsistent basis until 2014, when Louisville joined the ACC. Despite this, the two schools were in different divisions, with Louisville being placed in the Atlantic Division, and Miami in the Coastal Division. With this scheduling format, the two teams were scheduled to meet twice every twelve years.

In 2022, the ACC announced that it would eliminate divisions and starting in 2023 would use a new 3-5-5 format for conference schedules. This format gave each team 3 permanent opponents to be played annually, with Miami and Louisville set as conference rivals. The 2023 season would be the only one played using this format.

Prior to the 2023 matchup, the Schnellenberger Trophy was introduced to be rewarded to the winner of the game. The trophy honors Howard Schnellenberger, who was a head coach for Miami from 1979 to 1983, and for Louisville from 1985 to 1994. He was credited with rebuilding both schools' football programs and leading them out of financial distress. The trophy itself is a bronzed pair of Schellenberger's famous cowboy boots.

After the ACC added three new teams to the conference, changes were again made to the scheduling format for 2024 and beyond. The new format allows for every team to play at least twice every seven years. Miami and Louisville will play each other three times in seven seasons from 2024 to 2030.

== Notable games ==
=== Miami comeback with Devin Hester (2004) ===
In an instant classic on a Thursday night, the #18 Louisville Cardinals went on the road to play the #3 Miami Hurricanes at the Orange Bowl. After being down 17 twice, Miami went on to win 41–38. Devin Hester led the comeback in the 4th quarter with a punt returned for a touchdown and another for 34 yards.

Both rosters were loaded with NFL talent in a game that featured 44 players who went on to play in the NFL, 22 from both teams. Notable players include Devin Hester, Frank Gore, Greg Olsen, Antrel Rolle, Elvis Dumervil, William Gay, Michael Bush and Harry Douglas.

=== Stomping the Cardinal Bird (2006) ===
#12 Louisville hosted #17 Miami in front of a record-breaking, sold-out crowd of 42,704 at Cardinal Stadium. Before the game, several Miami players stomped on the Cardinal bird logo at mid-field, provoking a fight between the teams. Louisville went on to stomp on the Hurricanes, winning 31–7. This was Louisville's first win in the series and the start of a 3-game winning streak. Starting QB Brian Brohm left the game early in the third quarter due to a thumb injury.

=== First Howard Schnellenberger Trophy (2023) ===
In the inaugural game for the Howard Schnellenberger trophy, #10 Louisville went on the road to Hard Rock Stadium to take on Miami. The game turned into a shootout with the Cards winning 38–31 to take home the trophy and clinch their first ever berth to the ACC Championship game.

=== Louisville upset #2 Miami (2025) ===
Unranked Louisville went on the road and upset undefeated #2 Miami, snapping a 10-game home winning streak and giving the Canes their first home loss since Louisville beat them in 2023. Louisville's defense held Miami to 63 rushing yards and forced 4 interceptions from Carson Beck, including a game sealing pick in the final minute by T.J. Capers. Chris Bell finished with 136 yards and 2 touchdowns. The Cards won their first ever road game over a top 5 opponent.

== Game results ==
Louisville victories	Miami victories	Tie games

No.	Date	Location	Winning team		Losing team	
1	November 11, 1933	Miami, FL	Miami	33	Louisville	7
2	October 8, 1949	Louisville, KY	Miami	26	Louisville	0
3	November 10, 1950	Miami, FL	Tie	13	Tie	13
4	September 15, 1979	Miami, FL	Miami	24	Louisville	12
5	September 6, 1980	Louisville, KY	Miami	24	Louisville	10
6	October 2, 1982	Louisville, KY	#17 Miami	28	Louisville	6
7	October 8, 1983	Miami, FL	#12 Miami	42	Louisville	14
8	November 3, 1984	Louisville, KY	#6 Miami	38	Louisville	23
9	October 26, 1985	Miami, FL	#15 Miami	45	Louisville	7
10	October 14, 2004	Miami, FL	#3 Miami	41	#18 Louisville	38
11	September 16, 2006	Louisville, KY	#12 Louisville	31	#17 Miami	7
12	December 28, 2013	Orlando, FL	#18 Louisville	36	Miami	9
13	September 1, 2014	Louisville, KY	#25 Louisville	31	Miami	13
14	November 9, 2019	Miami Gardens, FL	Miami	52	Louisville	27
15	September 19, 2020	Louisville, KY	#17 Miami	47	#18 Louisville	34
16	November 18, 2023	Miami Gardens, FL	#9 Louisville	38	Miami	31
17	October 19, 2024	Louisville, KY	#6 Miami	52	Louisville	45
18	October 17, 2025	Miami Gardens, FL	Louisville	24	#2 Miami	21
Series: Miami leads 12–5–1

== See also ==
- List of NCAA college football rivalry games
