= 2015 Washington State Cougars football team =

American college football season

2015 Washington State Cougars football

Sun Bowl champion

Sun Bowl, W 20–14 vs. Miami (FL)
- Conference: Pac-12 Conference
- North Division
- Record: 9–4 (6–3 Pac-12)
- Head coach: Mike Leach (4th season)
- Offensive scheme: Air raid
- Defensive coordinator: Alex Grinch (1st season)
- Base defense: Multiple 3–4
- Home stadium: Martin Stadium

2015 Pac-12 Conference football standings
	Conf.			Overall
Team	W		L	W		L
North Division
No. 3 Stanford xy$	8	–	1	12	–	2
No. 19 Oregon	7	–	2	9	–	4
Washington State	6	–	3	9	–	4
California	4	–	5	8	–	5
Washington	4	–	5	7	–	6
Oregon State	0	–	9	2	–	10
South Division
USC xy	6	–	3	8	–	6
No. 17 Utah x	6	–	3	10	–	3
UCLA	5	–	4	8	–	5
Arizona State	4	–	5	6	–	7
Arizona	3	–	6	7	–	6
Colorado	1	–	8	4	–	9
Championship: Stanford 41, USC 22
$ – Conference champion; x – Division champion/co-champions; y – Championship game participant; Rankings from AP Poll

The 2015 Washington State Cougars football team represented Washington State University during the 2015 NCAA Division I FBS football season. The team was coached by fourth-year head coach Mike Leach and played their home games at Martin Stadium in Pullman, Washington. They were members of the North Division of the Pac-12 Conference. They finished the season 9–4, 6–3 in Pac-12 play to finish in third place in the North Division. They were invited to the Sun Bowl where they defeated the Miami Hurricanes.

== Schedule ==
Date	Time	Opponent	Rank	Site	TV	Result	Attendance
September 5	11:00 am	Portland State*		Martin Stadium; Pullman, WA	P12N	L 17–24	24,302
September 12	12:30 pm	at Rutgers*		High Point Solutions Stadium; Piscataway, NJ	ESPNU	W 37–34	46,536
September 19	5:30 pm	Wyoming*		Martin Stadium; Pullman, WA	P12N	W 31–14	31,105
October 3	1:00 pm	at No. 24 California		California Memorial Stadium; Berkeley, CA	P12N	L 28–34	42,042
October 10	3:00 pm	at Oregon		Autzen Stadium; Eugene, OR	P12N	W 45–38 ^{2OT}	57,775
October 17	1:00 pm	Oregon State^{†}		Martin Stadium; Pullman, WA	P12N	W 52–31	32,952
October 24	1:00 pm	at Arizona		Arizona Stadium; Tucson, AZ	P12N	W 45–42	47,847
October 31	7:30 pm	No. 8 Stanford		Martin Stadium; Pullman, WA	ESPN	L 28–30	30,012
November 7	12:30 pm	Arizona State		Martin Stadium; Pullman, WA	FS1	W 38–24	32,952
November 14	7:45 pm	at No. 19 UCLA		Rose Bowl; Pasadena, CA	ESPN	W 31–27	76,255
November 21	7:45 pm	Colorado		Martin Stadium; Pullman, WA	ESPN2	W 27–3	25,121
November 27	12:30 pm	at Washington	No. 20	Husky Stadium; Seattle, WA (Apple Cup)	Fox	L 10–45	70,438
December 26	11:00 am	vs. Miami (FL)*		Sun Bowl; El Paso, TX (Sun Bowl)	CBS	W 20–14	41,180
*Non-conference game; ^{†}Homecoming; Rankings from AP Poll and CFP Rankings after November 3 released prior to game; All times are in Pacific time

== Rankings ==
Ranking movements Legend: ██ Increase in ranking ██ Decrease in ranking — = Not ranked RV = Received votes
	Week															
Poll	Pre	1	2	3	4	5	6	7	8	9	10	11	12	13	14	Final
AP	—	—	—	—	—	—	—	—	RV	RV	RV	24	20	RV	RV	RV
Coaches	—	—	—	—	—	—	—	RV	RV	RV	RV	23	20	RV	RV	RV
CFP	Not released									—	—	—	20	—	—	Not released

== Game summaries ==
=== Portland State ===
	1	2	3	4	Total
Vikings	0	0	10	14	24
Cougars	3	7	0	7	17

=== @ Rutgers ===
	1	2	3	4	Total
Cougars	7	6	7	17	37
Scarlet Knights	0	6	6	22	34

=== Wyoming ===
	1	2	3	4	Total
Cowboys	14	0	0	0	14
Cougars	7	14	0	10	31

=== @ California ===
	1	2	3	4	Total
Cougars	7	14	7	0	28
#24 Golden Bears	7	6	21	0	34

=== @ Oregon ===
	1	2	3	4	OT	2OT	Total
Cougars	7	7	7	10	7	7	45
Ducks	10	7	7	7	7	0	38

=== Oregon State ===
	1	2	3	4	Total
Beavers	3	14	0	14	31
Cougars	14	31	0	7	52

=== @ Arizona ===
	1	2	3	4	Total
Cougars	14	17	7	7	45
Wildcats	0	21	7	14	42

=== Stanford ===
	1	2	3	4	Total
#8 Cardinal	3	0	17	10	30
Cougars	3	9	10	6	28

=== Arizona State ===
	1	2	3	4	Total
Sun Devils	14	0	7	3	24
Cougars	0	10	7	21	38

=== @ UCLA ===
	1	2	3	4	Total
Cougars	7	7	7	10	31
#18 Bruins	6	10	0	11	27

=== Colorado ===
	1	2	3	4	Total
Buffaloes	0	0	3	0	3
#24 Cougars	7	7	3	10	27

=== @ Washington ===
	1	2	3	4	Total
#20 Cougars	3	0	7	0	10
Huskies	7	10	7	21	45

=== Vs. Miami (FL) ===
	1	2	3	4	Total
Hurricanes	7	0	0	7	14
Cougars	7	13	0	0	20

== Coaching staff ==
- Mike Leach – Head coach/offensive coordinator
- Jim Mastro – Running backs
- David Yost – Inside receivers
- Graham Harrell – Outside receivers
- Clay McGuire – Offensive line
- Joe Salave'a – Assistant head coach/defensive line
- David Lose – Defensive quality control
- Alex Grinch – Defensive coordinator/secondary
- Ken Wilson – Linebackers
- Roy Manning – Outside linebackers
- Brian Odom – Defensive quality control
- Eric Mele – Special teams
- Dave Emerick – Chief of staff
- Antonio Huffman – Director of football operations
- Jason Loscalzo – Strength and conditioning
