= Larry Scott (American football) =

American football player and coach (born 1977)

Current position
- Title: Tight ends coach
- Team: Auburn
- Conference: SEC

Biographical details
- Born: January 2, 1977 (age 49); Sebring, Florida, U.S.

Playing career
- 1996–1999: South Florida
- Position: Offensive tackle

Coaching career (HC unless noted)
- 2001: Paul R. Wharton HS (FL) (RGC/OL)
- 2001–2003: Freedom HS (FL) (OL)
- 2004: Sebring HS (FL) (co-OC)
- 2006: South Florida (GA)
- 2007–2008: South Florida (TE)
- 2009: South Florida (OL)
- 2010–2011: South Florida (TE)
- 2012: South Florida (RB)
- 2013–2015: Miami (FL) (TE)
- 2015: Miami (FL) (interim HC)
- 2016: Tennessee (TE)
- 2017: Tennessee (OC/TE)
- 2018–2019: Florida (TE)
- 2020–2025: Howard
- 2026–present: Auburn (TE)

Administrative career (AD unless noted)
- 2005: South Florida (HSR)

Head coaching record
- Overall: 27–39
- Bowls: 0–2

Accomplishments and honors

Championships
- 2 MEAC (2022–2023)

Larry Scott (born January 2, 1977) is an American college football coach. He is the tight ends coach for the Auburn Tigers.

Scott played college football at the University of South Florida. He returned to South Florida in 2006 as a coach. He joined Miami as the tight end coach in 2013. He became the interim head coach on October 25, 2015 after Al Golden was fired.

After Mark Richt was hired as the Hurricanes head coach, Scott was hired by head coach Butch Jones to serve as tight ends coach for the Tennessee Volunteers in 2016. Scott was promoted to offensive coordinator after the 2016 season. After the firing of Butch Jones, Scott was not retained by new head coach Jeremy Pruitt. On January 25, 2018, Scott was hired by the Florida Gators to coach tight ends under new coach Dan Mullen. Scott replaced Ja'Juan Seider who left to coach running backs at Penn State.

== Head coaching record ==
Year	Team	Overall	Conference	Standing	Bowl/playoffs
Miami Hurricanes (Atlantic Coast Conference) (2015)
2015	Miami	4–2	4–1	3rd (Coastal)	L Sun
Miami:		4–2	4–1		
Howard Bison (Mid-Eastern Athletic Conference) (2020–present)
2020–21	Howard	0–2	0–2	2nd (North)	
2021	Howard	3–8	1–4	T–5th	
2022	Howard	5–6	4–1	T–1st	
2023	Howard	6–6	4–1	T–1st	L Celebration
2024	Howard	4–8	1–4	5th	
2025	Howard	5–7	2–3	4th	
Howard:		23–37	12–15		
Total:		27–39			
National championship Conference title Conference division title or championship game berth
