= Canaan Severin =

American football player (born 1993)

No. 9, 13, 83
- Position: Wide receiver

Personal information
- Born: March 16, 1993 (age 33); Marlborough, Massachusetts, U.S.
- Listed height: 6 ft 3 in (1.91 m)
- Listed weight: 220 lb (100 kg)

Career information
- High school: Worcester Academy (MA)
- College: Virginia
- NFL draft: 2016: undrafted

Career history
- Pittsburgh Steelers (2016); New York Giants (2017)*
- * Offseason or practice squad member only

Awards and highlights
- Second-team All-ACC (2015)
- Stats at Pro Football Reference

Canaan T. Severin (born March 16, 1993) is an American former football wide receiver. He played college football at Virginia. Severin is also an aspiring film producer, whose short film, "Lean In" has been nominated for the Boston Film Festival.

== Early life ==
Severin attended Marlborough High School in Marlborough, Massachusetts, where he played football and basketball. While at Marlborough High, Severin served as captain of the basketball team in his sophomore year, leading the team to a Mid-Wach B championship. During this time, he was teammates with Notre Dame standout Zach Auguste.

In 2009, Severin transferred to Worcester Academy, a boarding school in Worcester, Massachusetts, where he resided in a dormitory during his final three years of high school. At Worcester Academy, he excelled in football, basketball, and track and field. By 2012, Severin was ranked as the No. 3 recruit in Massachusetts and the No. 28 wide receiver in the nation, earning a 247Sports rating of 93 and a 4-star prospect.

A standout track athlete, Severin competed in sprinting and jumping events, including the 4 × 100 m relay, 4 × 400 m relay, 200 m sprint, and triple jump. He tied the school record in the 200 m sprint with a time of 22.4 seconds, matching the mark set by Ricky Lane in 1983.

In addition to his school sports career, Severin played AAU basketball in Massachusetts with programs such as Expressions Elite and the New England Playaz, where he was teammates with notable players such as Billy Baron, Ricky Ledo, Michael Carter-Williams, Kaleb Tarczewski, Alex Murphy, and Khem Birch.

Before his senior season, Severin committed to attend the University of Virginia, where he played for the Cavaliers football team. He received scholarship offers from several other programs, including Penn State, Boston College, Iowa, Missouri, and other.

== College career ==
As a freshman Severin appeared in all 12 games during his freshman season at the University of Virginia. He made his collegiate debut against Richmond and recorded his first career reception for three yards at Georgia Tech, finishing the season with one catch.

In his sophomore year, Severin played in nine of UVA's 12 games, missing three games due to injuries. He recorded five catches for 43 yards on the season.

As a junior in 2014, Severin emerged as a key player for the Cavaliers, appearing in all 12 games with nine starts. He led the team in receptions (42), receiving yards (578), and receiving touchdowns (5). Severin caught at least one pass in every game that season. He made his first collegiate start against UCLA in the season opener and caught his first two career touchdown passes against the Richmond Spiders. He recorded a one-handed spectacular catch that was featured as No. 2 on Sportscenter Top 10 against Miami on November 22, 2014.

In 2015, Severin was voted team captain and represented UVA at ACC Media Day ahead of his senior season. He appeared in all 12 games with six starts, finishing No. 3 in the ACC in receiving yards (759). Severin became the 20th player in UVA history to reach 100 career receptions and notched his first career 100-yard game with 11 catches for 153 yards against Notre Dame, earning ACC Receiver of the Week honors.

Against Syracuse, Severin caught four passes for 70 yards, including a critical 36-yard touchdown in overtime, which forced a second overtime and ultimately helped UVA secure a triple-overtime victory. Severin crossed the 1,000 career receiving yards mark in the same game.

He earned his second ACC Receiver of the Week honor after an eight-catch, 116-yard, three-touchdown performance against Louisville. Severin became the first UVA player to score three receiving touchdowns in a game since Tyrone Davis achieved the feat in 1994 against Navy.

He finished the 2015 season with 54 receptions, tying Herman Moore in 1990 for 11th all-time in single-season receptions at UVA. His 759 receiving yards also ranked 15th in program history for a single season.

Severin finished his UVA career with 102 receptions (19th all-time in program history) and 1,383 receiving yards (15th all-time). He recorded at least one catch in his final 24 games and notched 96 receptions across his last two seasons.

== Professional career ==
=== Pittsburgh Steelers ===
Severin signed with the Pittsburgh Steelers as an undrafted free agent on April 30, 2016. He was placed on injured reserve on August 5, with a shoulder injury.

Severin was released by the Steelers on May 2, 2017, only to be re-signed by the team on May 17. In the Steelers' preseason opener against the New York Giants on August 11, he caught two passes on four targets for 24 yards. Severin was later released by Pittsburgh on August 14.

=== New York Giants ===
On August 18, 2017, Severin signed with the New York Giants. He was waived by New York on September 2. Severin was re-signed to the Giants' practice squad on December 27. He signed a reserve/future contract with the Giants on January 1, 2018. Severin was waived by the Giants on May 7.
