= Mark D'Onofrio =

American football player and coach (born 1969)

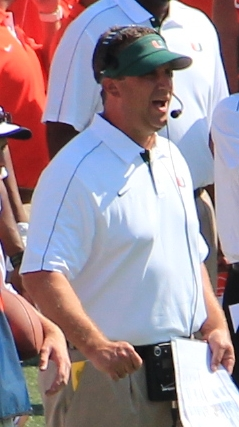
- D'Onofrio with the Miami Hurricanes

Current position
- Title: Linebackers coach
- Team: UCF Knights
- Conference: Big 12

Biographical details
- Born: March 17, 1969 (age 57); Hoboken, New Jersey, U.S.

Playing career
- 1988–1991: Penn State
- 1992–1993: Green Bay Packers
- Position: Linebacker

Coaching career (HC unless noted)
- 1999: Saint Peter's (LB)
- 2000: Georgia (DA)
- 2001: Rutgers (LB)
- 2002–2003: Rutgers (LB/RC)
- 2004: Virginia (ST/TE)
- 2005: Virginia (ST/ILB)
- 2006–2007: Temple (DC)
- 2008–2009: Temple (AHC/DC)
- 2010: Temple (AHC/DC/LB)
- 2011–2015: Miami (FL) (AHC/DC)
- 2017–2018: Houston (DC/LB)
- 2022: Wisconsin (ILB)
- 2023–2024: Stanford (ILB)
- 2025–present: UCF (LB)

Accomplishments and honors

Awards
- As a player: First-team All-Big East (1990)

Mark Emil D'Onofrio (born March 17, 1969) is an American college football coach and former professional player. He is currently the linebackers coach for UCF. D'Onofrio played collegiately as a linebacker at Pennsylvania State University and thereafter was drafted by the Green Bay Packers of the National Football League (NFL).

== Playing career ==
D'Onofrio played at the collegiate level with the Penn State Nittany Lions, where he was a team captain. In the 1992 NFL draft, D'Onofrio was selected in the second round by the Green Bay Packers with the 34th overall pick. He became a starter with the team that season, however a severe injury would cause him to retire soon after.

== Coaching career ==
D'Onofrio's first coaching experience was as linebackers coach at Saint Peter's College. The next year, he became a defensive assistant with the Georgia Bulldogs. From there he was a linebackers coach with the Rutgers Scarlet Knights and tight ends, special teams, and inside linebackers coach with the Virginia Cavaliers. D'Onofrio joined head coach Al Golden at Temple in 2006 as their defensive coordinator, later being promoted to the Assistant Head Coach/ Defensive Coordinator.

At Temple, he turned around a defense that was the worst in the NCAA the season before he was hired, elevating it to the 17th-ranked defense. He helped the Owls to their first conference division title and secured bowl eligibility for consecutive seasons, a program first. The 2009 season marked Temple's first winning record since 1990 and throughout their Big East era.

He followed head coach Al Golden to the University of Miami in the same position he held at Temple for the Miami Hurricanes football team in December 2010. Al Golden came to Coral Gables to replace Randy Shannon. After Golden was fired in the wake of a 58-0 loss to Clemson, D'Onofrio finished out the 2015 season as defensive coordinator and was then let go following Miami's SunBowl loss to Washington State, 20-16. On January 6, 2017, D'Onofrio was hired by the Houston Cougars as their defensive coordinator, beginning with the 2017 season. In 2018, Houston claimed the AAC West Division title. However, head coach Major Applewhite was fired later that year. D'Onofrio was also dismissed following the 2018 Bowl game loss to Army.

In early June 2022, it was reported that D'Onofrio would be hired by Paul Chryst and the Wisconsin Badgers as the inside linebackers coach.

His defenses at Miami ranked third in the ACC in turnovers (25) in 2015 and fourth in total defense in 2014, while at Stanford, he improved the run defense from 126th nationally (224.4 yards per game) in 2022 to 40th (132.9 yards per game) in 2024.

=== Pro development ===
As a defensive coordinator at Temple, Miami, and Houston, D’Onofrio developed over 25 NFL draft picks, including 10+ picks in the first three rounds, such as Heath Miller (1st round, 2005, x2 Pro Bowls), Muhammad Wilkerson (1st round, 2011, Pro Bowler), David Njoku (1st round, 2017, Pro Bowler), Artie Burns (1st round, 2016), Ed Oliver (1st round, 2019), Payton Turner (1st round, 2021), Jaiquawn Jarrett (2nd round, 2011), Denzel Perryman (2nd round, 2015, Pro Bowler), Logan Hall (2nd round, 2022), Ahmad Brooks (3rd round, 2006, x2 All-Pros), Sean Spence (3rd round, 2012), Terrance Knighton (3rd round, 2009), Olivier Vernon (3rd round, 2012), Allen Bailey (3rd round, 2011), Alvin Pearman (4th round, 2005), Colin McCarthy (4th round, 2011), Isaiah Johnson (4th round, 2019), Deon Bush (4th round, 2016), Rayshawn Jenkins (4th round, 2017), Brandon McGee (5th round, 2013), Corn Elder (5th round, 2017), Anthony Chickillo (6th round, 2015), Al-Quadin Muhammad (6th round, 2017), Emeke Egbule (6th round, 2019), Matthew Adams (7th round, 2018), Grant Stuard (7th round, 2021), Derek Parish (7th round, 2023). Additional players he coached during his career who reached the NFL include: Gary Brackett, Andre Neblett, Adrian Robinson, Dominique Harris, Marcus Forston, Ray-Ray Armstrong, LaDarius Gunter, Jamal Carter, Jimmy Gaines, D'Juan Hines, Alexander Myres, David Anenih, Nick Thurman, Maema Njongmeta, Jordan Turner.
