= Jimmy Gaines =

American gridiron football player (born 1993)

No. 45
- Position: Linebacker

Personal information
- Born: May 11, 1993 (age 33); Getzville, New York, U.S.
- Listed height: 6 ft 3 in (1.91 m)
- Listed weight: 240 lb (109 kg)

Career information
- High school: Canisius (Buffalo, New York)
- College: University of Miami
- NFL draft: 2014: undrafted

Career history
- Buffalo Bills (2014−2015)*; Edmonton Eskimos (2016)*
- * Offseason or practice squad member only

Awards and highlights
- Strength Training Athlete of the Year (2013)
- Stats at Pro Football Reference

Jimmy Gaines (born May 11, 1993) is an American former football linebacker. He played college football at Miami. He signed with the Buffalo Bills of the National Football League (NFL) as an undrafted free agent in 2014.

== High school ==
Gaines attended Canisius High School in Buffalo, New York. In his high school career, Gaines played a variety of positions including linebacker, safety, tight end, tailback, and wide receiver. He ended his career with 61 rushing yards, one rushing touchdown, 270 receiving yards, two receiving touchdowns, 154 tackles (108 solo), three sacks, one interception, and one fumble recovery. For his accomplishments, Gaines was named to the Class A NYSSA second-team All State team.

Considered a two-star recruit by Rivals.com, he was given a Rivals Rating of 5.4. He accepted a scholarship offer from the Miami Hurricanes.

== College career ==
As a true freshman in 2010, Gaines played in five games and recorded only one assisted tackle. In his sophomore year, Jimmy earned the starting job out of training camp and saw action in all 12 games, while starting eight. He had 58 tackles, the fifth-highest total on the team, and three tackles-for-loss. Gaines continued his strong play in 2012, playing in 11 games and again finishing fifth on the team with 57 tackles. He had three tackles-for-loss, as well as a fumble recovery, a pass breakup, and two interceptions. In his final season, Gaines started all 13 games at middle linebacker, recording 83 tackles, good for second on the team, two tackles-for-loss, one forced fumble, two fumble recoveries, and one pass breakup.

Gaines was named Strength Training Athlete of the Year after his senior season.

== Professional career ==
=== 2014 NFL draft ===
Jimmy Gaines was not selected during the 2014 NFL draft, but signed as an undrafted free agent with his hometown team, the Buffalo Bills. On September 1, 2015, he was released by the Bills.
