= Mark Walton (American football) =

American football player (born 1997)

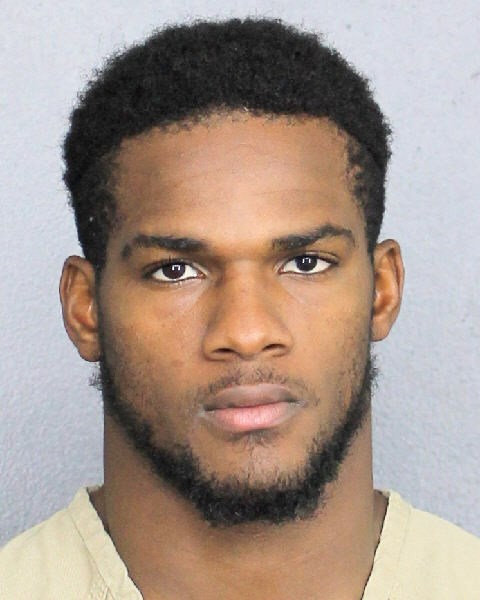
- Walton in 2019

No. 22, 32
- Position: Running back

Personal information
- Born: March 29, 1997 (age 29); Miami, Florida, U.S.
- Listed height: 5 ft 10 in (1.78 m)
- Listed weight: 200 lb (91 kg)

Career information
- High school: Miami (FL) Booker T. Washington
- College: Miami (FL)
- NFL draft: 2018: 4th round, 112th overall pick

Career history
- Cincinnati Bengals (2018); Miami Dolphins (2019)

Career NFL statistics
- Rushing yards: 235
- Rushing average: 3.5
- Receptions: 20
- Receiving yards: 130
- Stats at Pro Football Reference

Mark Walton (born March 29, 1997) is an American former professional football player who was a running back in the National Football League (NFL). He played college football for the Miami Hurricanes, and he was selected by the Cincinnati Bengals in the fourth round of the 2018 NFL draft. He also played for the Miami Dolphins.

== Early life ==
Walton attended Booker T. Washington High School in Miami, Florida. During his career, he rushed for 2,769 yards and 45 touchdowns for the Tornadoes. He committed to the University of Miami to play college football. Walton attended Booker T. Washington High School (Miami) in Miami, Florida, where he was rated a consensus four-star recruit by ESPN, 6Rivals, Scout, and 247Sports. As a senior, he rushed for 1,472 yards and 22 touchdowns, finishing his varsity career with 2,769 total rushing yards and 45 touchdowns. In Booker T. Washington’s 54–35 state championship win, Walton recorded 184 rushing yards and 3 rushing touchdowns, along with 89 receiving yards and 2 receiving touchdowns. He received scholarship offers from several Power Five programs, including Auburn, Florida State, Tennessee, and South Carolina, before committing to the University of Miami.

== College career ==
Walton played in all 13 games as a true freshman at Miami in 2015, rushing for 450 yards on 129 carries with 9 touchdowns. As a sophomore in 2016, he started all 13 games and rushed for 1,117 yards on 209 carries with 14 touchdowns. In 2017, as a junior, he rushed for 428 yards and three touchdowns on 56 carries in only four games due to ankle surgery which forced him to miss a majority of the season. On December 5, 2017, Walton declared his intentions to enter the 2018 NFL draft. On September 23, 2017, Walton delivered one of the most productive single-game rushing performances in Miami history, posting 204 yards and a touchdown on just 11 carries in a win over Toledo Rockets football. His 82-yard touchdown run in the first half was the seventh 200-yard rushing performance ever recorded by a Miami running back and tied for the sixth-highest single-game rushing total in program history.

=== College statistics ===
Season	Team	Conf	Class	Pos	GP	Rushing				Receiving			
Season	Team	Conf	Class	Pos	GP	Att	Yds	Avg	TD	Rec	Yds	Avg	TD
2015	Miami (FL)	ACC	FR	RB	13	130	461	3.5	9	22	293	13.3	1
2016	Miami (FL)	ACC	SO	RB	13	209	1,117	5.3	14	27	240	8.9	1
2017	Miami (FL)	ACC	JR	RB	5	56	428	7.6	3	7	91	13.0	0
Career					31	395	2,006	5.1	26	56	624	11.1	2

== Professional career ==
Pre-draft measurables
Height	Weight	Arm length	Hand span	40-yard dash	Vertical jump	Broad jump	Bench press
5 ft 9 5/8 in (1.77 m)	202 lb (92 kg)	30 in (0.76 m)	9 1/4 in (0.23 m)	4.60 s	31.5 in (0.80 m)	9 ft 10 in (3.00 m)	18 reps
All values from NFL Combine

=== Cincinnati Bengals ===
Walton was drafted by the Cincinnati Bengals in the fourth round (112th overall) of the 2018 NFL Draft. In the Bengals' Week 4 victory over the Atlanta Falcons, he had his first five professional carries for nine rushing yards to go along with two receptions for 28 receiving yards. Overall, he finished his rookie season with 14 carries for 34 rushing yards to go along with five receptions for 41 receiving yards.

On April 6, 2019, Walton was waived by the Bengals after being arrested for the third time in the offseason.

=== Miami Dolphins ===
After a mini-camp tryout, Walton signed with the Miami Dolphins on May 12, 2019. Walton made his first start against the Washington Redskins, rushing six times for 32 yards in a 16–17 Dolphins loss. He rushed for 66 yards on 14 carries the following week against the Buffalo Bills, also catching one reception for −8 yards. On November 4, Walton was suspended four games by the NFL for violating the league's personal conduct and substance abuse policies for his offseason arrests. The Dolphins waived Walton on November 19, after his fourth arrest of the year. His suspension was lifted on December 3. Walton was suspended an additional eight weeks by the NFL on November 13, 2020, and reinstated on January 4, 2021.

== Legal issues ==
Walton was arrested three times during the 2019 off-season. He was first arrested and charged with misdemeanor marijuana possession on January 16, 2019, in North Miami-Dade. On February 15, 2019, he was arrested for a second time and charged with misdemeanor battery for an altercation triggered after he grabbed a phone from a neighbor in Miami. The charges underlying his third arrest on April 4, 2019, stemmed from a March 12, 2019, incident in which Walton fled on foot from his rented car after police tried to pull him over. Authorities found a rifle in the car and accused Walton of carrying a concealed firearm, resisting an officer without violence, possession of marijuana, and reckless driving. Walton pleaded no contest to a misdemeanor weapons charge from the March 2019 incident on August 19, 2019, and he received six months of probation and was required to turn in all of his firearms as well as undergo anger management and driving courses. The two marijuana possession charges and the battery charge were also dismissed.

On November 19, 2019, Walton was arrested in Davie, Florida, for allegedly attacking a woman who was five months pregnant with his child. Walton was charged with aggravated battery of a pregnant woman. On January 3, 2020, he was charged with a second count of aggravated battery of a pregnant woman for a different incident with the same woman in March 2019. He was arrested on February 27, 2020, for violating a restraining order. On May 13, 2020, the aggravated battery charge against him from November 2019 was dropped.

On February 1, 2021, Walton was arrested in Miami for allegedly attempting to break a Pizza Hut window. Police bodycam footage captured Walton in a confrontation with Pizza Hut employees after he claimed one of them called him a racial slur and cancelled his order, followed by him allegedly assaulting his cousin who police reported was attempting to defuse the situation. Walton was arrested and captured on bodycam footage urinating on himself while in police custody. He was charged with two counts of misdemeanor trespassing and misdemeanor disorderly conduct, but the charges were later dropped.

On March 24, 2022, Walton was arrested in Miami for an alleged armed robbery. The alleged incident occurred on February 4, 2022. Police reported that Walton allegedly robbed someone of a Rolex watch at gunpoint amidst a confrontation between Walton, an accomplice, and the victim. The incident was captured on surveillance footage, and after a search warrant was executed at Walton's residence, Walton was charged with armed robbery and initially held without bail.
