= James Coley (American football coach) =

American football coach (born 1973)

Current position
- Title: Wide receivers coach
- Team: Georgia
- Conference: SEC

Biographical details
- Born: April 14, 1973 (age 53); Miami, Florida, U.S.
- Education: Florida State University

Coaching career (HC unless noted)
- 1997–1999: Miami Senior (FL) HS (QB)
- 2000–2002: Miami Norland (FL) HS (AHC/OC)
- 2003–2004: LSU (GA)
- 2005–2006: Miami Dolphins (off. assistant)
- 2007: FIU (OC/QB)
- 2008–2009: Florida State (TE/RC)
- 2010–2012: Florida State (OC/TE)
- 2013–2015: Miami (FL) (OC/QB)
- 2016–2017: Georgia (WR)
- 2018: Georgia (co-OC/QB)
- 2019: Georgia (OC/QB)
- 2020–2021: Texas A&M (WR)
- 2022–2023: Texas A&M (co-OC/TE)
- 2024–present: Georgia (WR)

James Coley (born April 14, 1973) is an American football coach who is currently the wide receivers coach at the Georgia Bulldogs. He had previously been co-offensive coordinator and tight ends coach at Texas A&M University.

Coley is a Miami native who played quarterback at Miami Senior High School and worked in the National Football League (NFL) as an offensive assistant and quality control coach with the Miami Dolphins. His coaching résumé also includes stops at 2003 National Champion Louisiana State University and 2002 Florida 6A State Champion Miami Norland Senior High School, in addition to his experiences with the Dolphins. Coley was labelled and considered the ACC top recruiter by ESPN recruiting. Coley is considered to be an ace recruiter in the talent-rich South Florida area. He was also named the top recruiter in the conference.

== Coaching career ==
=== High school ===
Coley spent six years as a high school coach in Miami before moving to the college ranks. He was a quarterback coach at Miami Senior High School for three seasons, where he worked with future Miami Hurricanes football stars Andre Johnson and Roscoe Parrish. He then moved on to Miami Norland Senior High School, where he was the assistant head coach and the offensive coordinator. At Miami Norland he coached future college stars Dwayne Bowe (LSU), Kareem Brown (UM), Alexander Bostic III (FIU), and Antwan Barnes (FIU). Coley won the 2002 class 6A state title in his last year at Miami Norland.

=== LSU ===
Coley's college coaching career started at Louisiana State University (LSU) in 2003, where he was an offensive graduate assistant under offensive coordinator Jimbo Fisher for two seasons. Coley and LSU won the national championship in his first year there, winning the Capital One Bowl in his second year.

=== Miami Dolphins ===
Coley joined LSU head coach Nick Saban on the Miami Dolphins coaching staff as an offensive assistant when Saban was hired by the Dolphins prior to the 2005 season. Coley left the Dolphins after the 2006 season when Saban bolted unexpectedly to the University of Alabama.

=== FIU ===
Coley spent one season as offensive coordinator at Florida International University under head coach Mario Cristobal and completely revamped the FIU offense. Through the first six contests of the season, Florida International's schedule featured five bowl teams from 2006. With Coley installing his new offense, the Golden Panthers scored a total of 44 points and averaged 211.7 yards of offense per game but that all changed in the second half of the season. In its final six games FIU's offense scored 137 points and averaged 327.7 yards per game. On top of more than tripling its points scored in the second half of the year, Coley's ground game almost doubled its output (85.5 ypg to 152.7 ypg) and the passing offense increased by almost 39% (126.2 ypg to 175.0 ypg).

=== Florida State ===
Coley was hired by FSU head coach Bobby Bowden on February 21, 2008. Coley was reunited with former boss at LSU, Jimbo Fisher. Coley was hired to coach the TEs and to be the new recruiting coordinator at FSU. Coley spent five seasons on the FSU staff, all 5 as the TE coach, and gave up the RC title in 2010 when he was promoted to OC. Dameyune Craig became the new RC. In 2010, Jimbo Fisher was promoted to head coach after Bobby Bowden retired, Fisher promoted Coley to offensive coordinator, though Fisher would still be calling the plays. Coley was known as one of FSU's top recruiters, helping them bring in top recruiting classes nearly every season he was on staff, including back-to-back top 10 classes in 2008 and 2009, the number 1 overall class in the 2011, and the 2nd overall class in 2012 according to ESPN

=== Miami (FL) ===
The Miami Hurricanes offered Coley the role of offensive coordinator with full play-calling duty on January 24, 2013. When Al Golden, the Hurricanes' head coach, was fired, Coley left the Hurricanes for the University of Georgia.

=== Georgia ===
Coley was hired by Mark Richt's replacement at Georgia, Kirby Smart, on January 3, 2016, to be the program's new wide receivers coach. On January 11, 2019, following the departure of former Georgia offensive coordinator Jim Chaney, he was promoted to offensive coordinator following the 2018 season. After a season where the Bulldogs struggled to create explosive plays and ranked 61st in total offense, Coley was relieved of his coordinator duties and was given the title of assistant head coach.

=== Texas A&M ===
About a week after his demotion, Coley was named the tight ends coach at Texas A&M.

=== South Carolina ===
Coley was hired by Shane Beamer, on January 10, 2024, to be the program's new wide receivers coach and offensive assistant; however, about a month later in February 2024, Georgia hired him away to be the Bulldogs wide receivers coach.
