= Al Golden =

American football player and coach (born 1969)

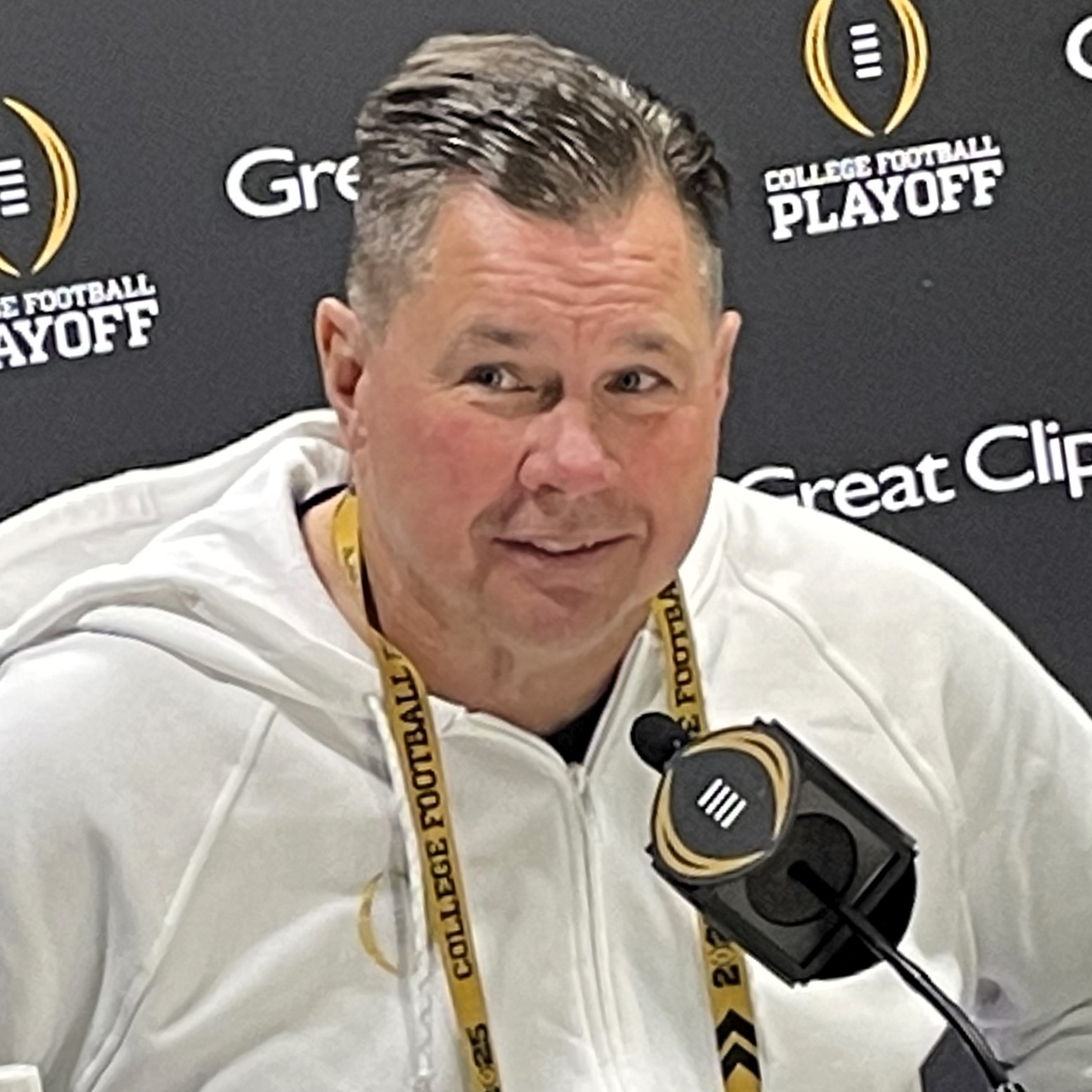
- Golden in 2025

Cincinnati Bengals
- Title: Defensive coordinator

Personal information
- Born: July 4, 1969 (age 57); Colts Neck, New Jersey, U.S.

Career information
- Position: Tight end
- College: Penn State (1988–1991)

Career history

Playing
- New England Patriots (1992)

Coaching
- Red Bank Catholic HS (NJ) (1993) Offensive coordinator; Virginia (1994–1996) Graduate assistant; Boston College (1997–1999) Linebackers coach; Penn State (2000) Linebackers coach; Virginia (2001–2005) Defensive coordinator; Temple (2006–2010) Head coach; Miami (FL) (2011–2015) Head coach; Detroit Lions (2016–2019); Tight ends coach (2016–2017); Linebackers coach (2018–2019); Cincinnati Bengals (2020–2021) Linebackers coach; Notre Dame (2022–2024); Defensive coordinator & linebackers coach (2022–2023); Defensive coordinator (2024); Cincinnati Bengals (2025–present) Defensive coordinator

Awards and highlights
- Broyles Award (2024); MAC East Division title (2009); MAC Coach of the Year (2009)

Head coaching record
- Career: NCAA: 59–59 (.500)
- Coaching profile at Pro Football Reference

Alfred James Golden Jr. (born July 4, 1969) is an American professional football coach and former tight end who is the defensive coordinator for the Cincinnati Bengals of the National Football League (NFL). He served as the head football coach for the Temple Owls from 2006 to 2010 and the Miami Hurricanes from 2011 to 2015.

Prior to head coaching, he was the defensive coordinator for the Virginia Cavaliers from 2001 to 2005. Golden played college football for the Penn State Nittany Lions and professionally for the New England Patriots of the National Football League (NFL).

== Playing career ==
=== College ===
Golden was a three-year (1989–1991) letter winner and tight end for Penn State, where he received the 1991 Ridge Riley Award, given annually to a player who displays excellence in scholarship, sportsmanship, friendship, and leadership. As a junior in 1990, Golden played a key role in Penn State's nationally televised 24–21 upset of #1-ranked Notre Dame in South Bend. His touchdown reception late in the fourth quarter tied the score at 21 as Penn State rallied from a 21–7 deficit. Golden was named captain of the Nittany Lions his senior year and helped lead them to a 42–17 win over Tennessee in the 1992 Fiesta Bowl, an 11–2 record, and a #3 ranking in the final 1991 AP Poll.

=== Professional ===
Golden spent the 1992 season in the National Football League with the New England Patriots as a tight end.

== Coaching career ==
Golden began his coaching career in 1993 as offensive coordinator at Red Bank Catholic High School in Red Bank, New Jersey. He then served as a graduate assistant under George Welsh at Virginia from 1994 to 1996, where he worked primarily with the linebackers and special teams. He helped develop All-ACC linebackers James Farrior and Jamie Sharper, both of whom were chosen in the 1997 NFL draft. He then coached linebackers at Boston College from 1997 to 1999 under Tom O'Brien. While at Boston College, Golden coached All-Big East linebackers Frank Chamberlin and Erik Storz. The Eagles finished the 1999 regular season with an 8–3 record and a top-25 national ranking, while making their first postseason bowl appearance since 1994.

Named defensive coordinator by Virginia head coach Al Groh in 2001, Golden became the youngest defensive coordinator in Division I-A. He had spent the previous season at his alma mater, Penn State, serving as linebackers coach and recruiting coordinator under head coach Joe Paterno. From 2001 to 2004, the Cavaliers' defense improved under his tutelage, ranking 108th in total defense in his first year to ranking 18th in total defense in 2004. In the same time period, Virginia's scoring defense went from 74th in the nation (27.6 ppg) to 17th (17.7 ppg) utilizing Golden's 3–4 defense.

=== Temple ===
Golden was named head football coach at Temple University in December 2005, as the second-youngest head coach in NCAA football at that time, behind Northwestern's Pat Fitzgerald. Temple had a record of 3–31 during the three years before Golden was hired and had just been thrown out of the Big East Conference for non-competitiveness. In Golden's first three years at the helm, Temple recorded 1–11 in 2006, 4–8 in 2007 and then 5–7 mark in 2008. The 2008 record was the best for the program since a 7–4 mark in 1990.

The Owls finished the 2009 regular season at 9–3, their first winning season since 1990. It was also their best record since 1979, the last time they appeared in a postseason game, before facing the UCLA Bruins in the EagleBank Bowl on December 29, 2009. After leading for three quarters, the Owls fell to the Bruins 30–21.

Golden was interviewed for the vacant head coach position at UCLA in December 2007. However, he withdrew his name from consideration on December 26, 2007, choosing to stay with the up-and-coming Temple program. Following the 2009 season, he was a candidate for the head coaching position at Cincinnati vacated by Brian Kelly, who departed for Notre Dame. He later asked that his name be withdrawn from consideration from that position. That same offseason, he was also a candidate for the job at Tennessee vacated by Lane Kiffin, who went to Southern California. In May 2010, Golden signed a contract extension with Temple through 2014. He led the Owls to an 8–4 record in 2010.

=== Miami ===
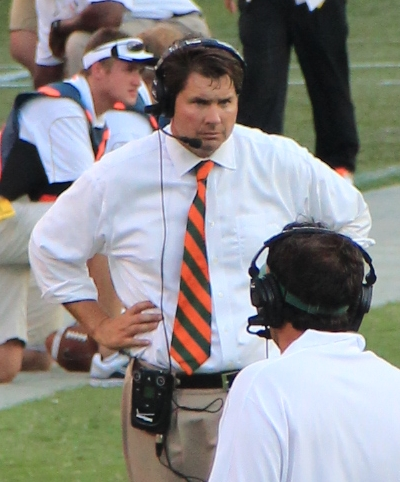
Golden on the Miami sideline during a 2012 game.

On December 12, 2010, ESPN reported that Golden was offered and accepted the head coaching job at the University of Miami.

In press conference remarks upon his hiring on December 13, 2010, Golden emphasized the importance of the University of Miami football legacy. "It's the most recognizable brand in college football," he said. "I go back to the former players that are here, the five national championships, 20 national award winners, countless All-Americans, incredible tradition. It's a dream job." Golden signed a five-year contract at an undisclosed salary on December 14, 2010. However, due to NCAA rules, Golden did not coach the football team in Miami's bowl game against Notre Dame but instead focused on recruiting players for 2011. Despite fielding teams with multiple future NFL draft picks, Golden was unable to defeat Florida State, his in-state rival, in 5 attempts. Golden began his tenure hampered by probation from a previous booster scandal, and self-imposed bowl bans during Golden's first two years with the program.

==== 2011 season ====
Golden posted a 6–6 record in his first year at the University of Miami. The 2011 season was only the third time since 1979 that the program had failed to register a winning record. Despite being bowl-eligible, Miami announced on November 20 that it was withdrawing from bowl consideration due to an ongoing investigation into the program's ties to convicted Ponzi schemer Nevin Shapiro.

==== 2012 season ====
The Hurricanes registered a 7–5 record in 2012 and were in contention for a Coastal Division title for much of the year. However, with the NCAA investigation still not resolved, on November 19, Miami announced it was withdrawing from bowl consideration for a second consecutive season. Reportedly, school officials remembered how Ohio State opted to play in a bowl in the 2011 season with an NCAA investigation still underway only to be banned from bowl consideration the following year.

==== 2013 season ====
Golden's third season at Miami saw more improvement from the previous two. The Hurricanes got off to a 7–0 start, including a win over rival Florida, and were ranked as high as #7 in the AP Poll. Their first loss came to eventual national champion Florida State, which started a 3-game losing streak for Miami. The Hurricanes ended the regular season at 9–3 (5–3 ACC), good for 2nd place in the Coastal Division. Golden's team was invited to the 2013 Russell Athletic Bowl, which the Canes lost 36–9 at the hands of future ACC foe Louisville.

==== 2014 season ====
Golden's fourth season at Miami was seen as a disappointment by many. The Hurricanes began the season with a 6–3 record, but lost their next four games beginning with a heartbreaking home loss to defending national champions Florida State and concluding with an uninspired defeat at the hands of South Carolina in the Duck Commander Independence Bowl. Golden's Hurricanes finished the season 6–7 despite being picked by many experts to win the ACC Coastal Division Championship and seven of its players being drafted by NFL franchises which was tied with Alabama for 4th most by a school, behind only Florida State (11), Louisville (10) and Florida (8).

==== 2015 season ====
The Hurricanes began their season with a 3–0 start, with wins over Florida Atlantic, Bethune-Cookman, and Nebraska. However, in their fourth game they were defeated by the Cincinnati Bearcats at Nippert Stadium. Fans clamored to see his immediate dismissal, even flying anti-Golden banners before games. Even Florida State fans got in on the act, attempting to raise money for their own "Keep Al Golden" banner with a GoFundMe campaign. Due to area banner planes being booked for the contest between the storied rivals on October 10, 2015, funds raised were instead donated to the Kidz 1st Fund charity organization in lieu of hiring a plane. Other reports suggested that Florida State and Miami officials pressured the campaign's manager to not fly the banner out of respect for the coach. On the day of the game itself, fans posted mock "Missing Persons" notices throughout Tallahassee questioning the whereabouts of the formerly feared Hurricanes program as they welcomed them for their biennial visit to Tallahassee and FSU's Doak Campbell Stadium.

After being identified as a 7-point home underdog to Clemson in Week 8, many in national media picked Miami to have a good chance at covering the spread and possibly even upset the Tigers. Despite this, Clemson jumped out to a 45–0 lead before pulling out their starters. Clemson handed the Hurricanes their worst loss in the 90-year history of the program as the Hurricanes fell by a score of 58–0. This then led the University of Miami athletic director Blake James to dismiss Golden as head coach, only a day after the loss. Golden was 32–25 (17–18 in the ACC) in over four seasons with the Hurricanes. Golden announced after his firing that "On behalf of my family I want to thank the University of Miami for a tremendous opportunity," Golden said in a release. "I believe in what we are doing and how we are doing it and we have some outstanding young men in our football program. Though this moment is difficult, we wish the Canes the best of luck going forward."

=== Detroit Lions ===
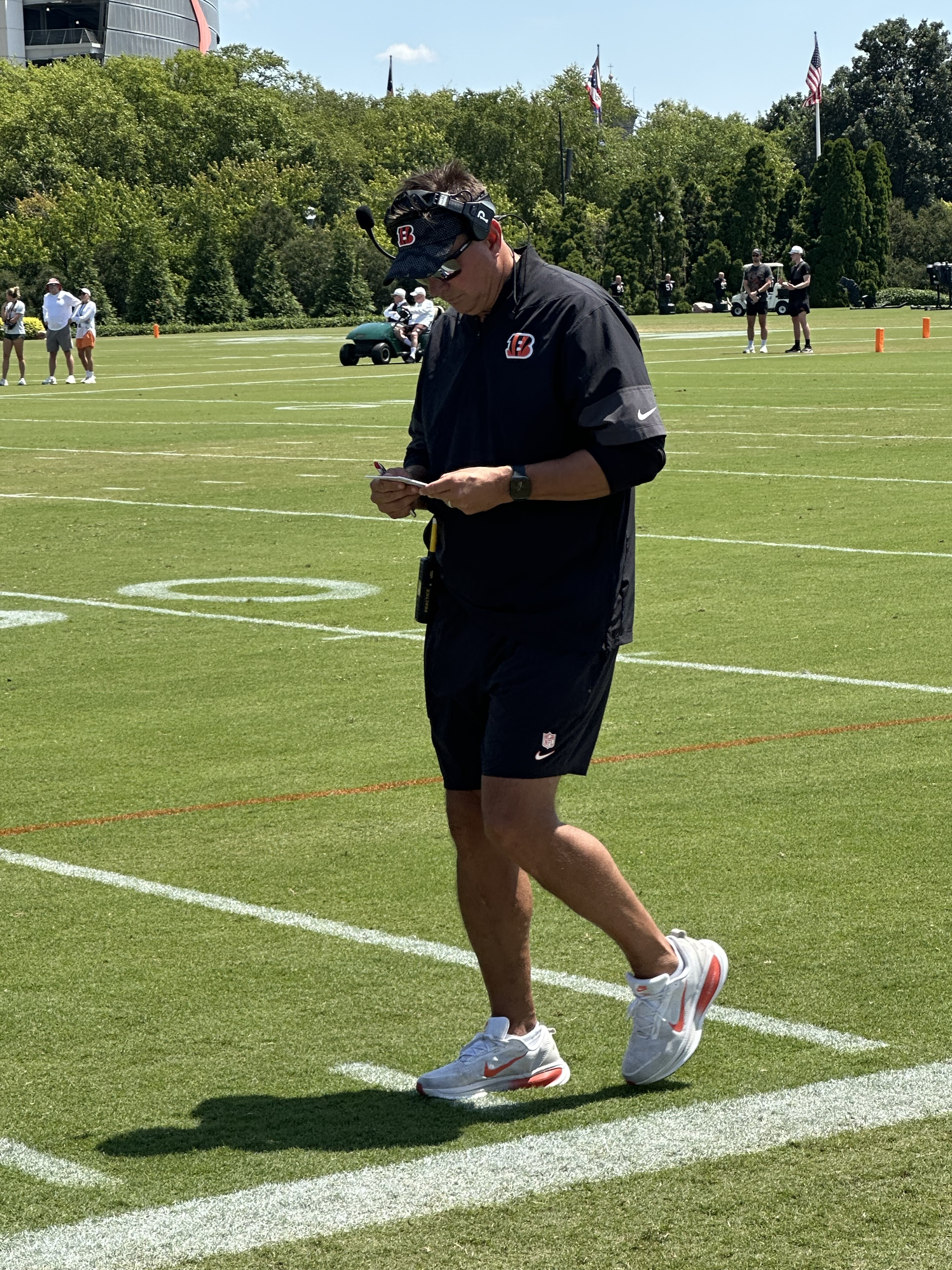
Al Golden as Cincinnati Bengals defensive coordinator at training camp in August 2025

On February 1, 2016, Golden was named tight ends coach of the Detroit Lions. On February 7, 2018, Golden was named linebackers coach of the Lions. He was fired December 31, 2019.

=== Cincinnati Bengals ===
Golden was hired by the Cincinnati Bengals as their linebackers coach on January 20, 2020. He missed the team's week 10 game in 2020 against the Pittsburgh Steelers due to COVID-19 pandemic protocols.

=== Notre Dame ===
On February 16, 2022, Golden was announced as the new defensive coordinator at Notre Dame, serving under recently promoted head coach Marcus Freeman. In 2023, the Irish ranked as the fifth-best defense in the nation by yards allowed. Golden signed a contract extension with Notre Dame in the offseason leading up to the 2024 campaign. He was awarded the Broyles Award at the conclusion of the 2024 season, in which he led Notre Dame to the #4 scoring defense in college football, which helped lead the Irish to a berth in the National Championship Game.

=== Cincinnati Bengals ===
On January 23, 2025, shortly after Notre Dame's loss to Ohio State in the National Championship Game, Golden was named defensive coordinator of the Cincinnati Bengals, replacing the fired Lou Anarumo. After back-to-back weeks in which the Bengals lost after allowing over 500 yards of offense and fourth quarter comebacks to the then-winless New York Jets and the Chicago Bears, the latter of which came after the Bengals scored two late touchdowns to take the lead with about a minute to go in the game, Golden was heavily criticized by fans and the media, with many fans lamenting he be stripped of his DC duties. However, head coach Zac Taylor defended Golden, calling him a "great football coach". After the season, which ended with Cincinnati going 6–11 and the defense being ranked last or at the bottom of the NFL in several defensive categories, Taylor announced that Golden would be retained for the 2026 season.

== Personal life ==
A native of Colts Neck, New Jersey, Golden graduated from Red Bank Catholic High School, Red Bank, New Jersey, and earned his undergraduate degree in pre-law from Pennsylvania State University in 1991 before receiving his master's in sports psychology from the University of Virginia in December 1996. A 2004 inductee of the Jersey Shore Sports Hall of Fame, he is married to Kelly Elizabeth Hanna of Lock Haven, Pennsylvania, and has a son, A.J. (Alfred James) Golden III, and two daughters, Addison Elizabeth Golden and Grace Hanna Golden.

For most of his head coaching career, Golden wore a dress shirt, slacks, and a tie in school colors on the sidelines, unlike most coaches of his generation.

== Head coaching record ==
| Year | Team | Overall | Conference | Standing | Bowl/playoffs |
|---|---|---|---|---|---|
Temple Owls (NCAA Division I FBS independent) (2006)
| 2006 | Temple | 1–11 | | | |
Temple Owls (Mid-American Conference) (2007–2010)
| 2007 | Temple | 4–8 | 4–4 | T–4th (East) | |
| 2008 | Temple | 5–7 | 4–4 | T–2nd (East) | |
| 2009 | Temple | 9–4 | 7–1 | T–1st (East) | L Eaglebank |
| 2010 | Temple | 8–4 | 5–3 | 3rd (East) | |
| Temple: | | 27–34 | 20–12 | | |
Miami Hurricanes (Atlantic Coast Conference) (2011–2015)
| 2011 | Miami | 6–6 | 3–5 | T–4th (Coastal) | ‡ |
| 2012 | Miami | 7–5 | 5–3 | T–1st (Coastal) ‡ | ‡ |
| 2013 | Miami | 9–4 | 5–3 | T–2nd (Coastal) | L Russell Athletic |
| 2014 | Miami | 6–7 | 3–5 | T–5th (Coastal) | L Independence |
| 2015 | Miami | 4–3 | 1–2 | (Coastal) | |
| Miami: | | 32–25 | 17–18 | ‡ Ineligible for Atlantic Coast Conference title, bowl game and Coaches Poll | |
| Total: | | 59–59 | | | |
National championship Conference title Conference division title or championship game berth
