= 2011 Florida State Seminoles football team =

American college football season

2011 Florida State Seminoles football

Champs Sports Bowl champion

Champs Sports Bowl, W 18–14 vs. Notre Dame
- Conference: Atlantic Coast Conference
- Atlantic Division

Ranking
- Coaches: No. 23
- AP: No. 23
- Record: 9–4 (5–3 ACC)
- Head coach: Jimbo Fisher (2nd season)
- Offensive coordinator: James Coley (2nd season)
- Offensive scheme: Pro-style
- Defensive coordinator: Mark Stoops (2nd season)
- Base defense: 4–3
- Captains: Nigel Bradham; EJ Manuel
- Home stadium: Doak Campbell Stadium

2011 Atlantic Coast Conference football standings
	Conf.			Overall
Team	W		L	W		L
Atlantic Division
No. 22 Clemson x$	6	–	2	10	–	4
Wake Forest	5	–	3	6	–	7
No. 23 Florida State	5	–	3	9	–	4
NC State	4	–	4	8	–	5
Boston College	3	–	5	4	–	8
Maryland	1	–	7	2	–	10
Coastal Division
No. 21 Virginia Tech x%	7	–	1	11	–	3
Virginia	5	–	3	8	–	5
Georgia Tech	5	–	3	8	–	5
Miami (FL)	3	–	5	6	–	6
North Carolina	3	–	5	7	–	6
Duke	1	–	7	3	–	9
Championship: Clemson 38, Virginia Tech 10
$ – BCS representative as conference champion; % – BCS at-large representative; x – Division champion/co-champions; Rankings from AP Poll

The 2011 Florida State Seminoles football team represented Florida State University in the 2011 NCAA Division I FBS college football season. The Seminoles were led by second-year head coach Jimbo Fisher and played their home games at Doak Campbell Stadium. They were members of the Atlantic Coast Conference, playing in the Atlantic Division.

Despite starting the season with a 2–3 record, the Seminoles finished the season 9–4, 5–3 in ACC play, to finish in a tie for second place in the Atlantic Division. They were invited to the Champs Sports Bowl where they defeated Notre Dame.

== Coaching staff ==
Name	Position
Jimbo Fisher	Head coach
Rick Trickett	Assistant head coach/offensive line coach
Greg Hudson	Assistant head coach/linebackers
Mark Stoops	Defensive coordinator/secondary coach
James Coley	Offensive coordinator/tight end coach
Dameyune Craig	Quarterbacks/recruiting coordinator
Lawrence Dawsey	Passing game coordinator/side receivers
D. J. Eliot	Defensive ends coach
Eddie Gran	Associate head coach/running backs/special teams coordinator
Odell Haggins	Defensive line
Vic Viloria	Head strength and conditioning coach

== Rankings ==
Ranking movements Legend: ██ Increase in ranking ██ Decrease in ranking — = Not ranked RV = Received votes
	Week															
Poll	Pre	1	2	3	4	5	6	7	8	9	10	11	12	13	14	Final
AP	6	5	5	11	23	23	—	—	—	RV	RV	23	RV	25	25	23
Coaches	5	4	5	14	24	22	—	—	—	RV	RV	22	RV	24	25	23
Harris	Not released						RV	RV	RV	RV	RV	23	RV	24	25	Not released
BCS	Not released							—	—	—	—	25	—	—	—	Not released

== Statistics ==
=== Scores by quarter (all opponents) ===
	1	2	3	4	Total
Florida State	102	113	60	167	442
All opponents	34	43	44	75	196

=== Scores by quarter (ACC opponents) ===
	1	2	3	4	Total
Florida State	68	79	33	70	250
ACC opponents	20	37	30	55	142

== Schedule ==
Date	Time	Opponent	Rank	Site	TV	Result	Attendance
September 3	3:30 p.m.	Louisiana–Monroe*	No. 6	Doak Campbell Stadium; Tallahassee, FL	ESPNU	W 34–0	72,226
September 10	6:00 p.m.	Charleston Southern*	No. 5	Doak Campbell Stadium; Tallahassee, FL	ESPN3	W 62–10	75,229
September 17	8:15 p.m.	No. 1 Oklahoma*	No. 5	Doak Campbell Stadium; Tallahassee, FL (College GameDay)	ABC	L 13–23	84,392
September 24	3:30 p.m.	at No. 21 Clemson	No. 11	Memorial Stadium; Clemson, SC (rivalry)	ESPN	L 30–35	80,994
October 8	12:30 p.m.	at Wake Forest	No. 23	BB&T Field at Groves Stadium; Winston-Salem, NC	ACCN	L 30–35	31,116
October 15	3:00 p.m.	at Duke		Wallace Wade Stadium; Durham, NC	ACCRSN	W 41–16	24,687
October 22	3:30 p.m.	Maryland		Doak Campbell Stadium; Tallahassee, FL	ABC/ESPN2	W 41–16	72,697
October 29	12:00 p.m.	NC State		Doak Campbell Stadium; Tallahassee, FL	ESPNU	W 34–0	80,849
November 3	8:00 p.m.	at Boston College		Alumni Stadium; Chestnut Hill, MA	ESPN	W 38–7	38,729
November 12	3:30 p.m.	Miami (FL)		Doak Campbell Stadium; Tallahassee, FL (rivalry)	ABC/ESPN	W 23–19	82,322
November 19	7:30 p.m.	Virginia^{†}	No. 23	Doak Campbell Stadium; Tallahassee, FL (Jefferson-Eppes Trophy)	ESPN2	L 13–14	77,178
November 26	7:00 p.m.	at Florida*		Ben Hill Griffin Stadium; Gainesville, FL (rivalry)	ESPN2	W 21–7	90,798
December 29	5:30 p.m.	vs. Notre Dame*	No. 25	Citrus Bowl; Orlando, FL (Champs Sports Bowl) (rivalry)	ESPN/ESPN 3D	W 18–14	68,305
*Non-conference game; ^{†}Homecoming; Rankings from AP Poll released prior to the game; All times are in Eastern time

== Awards ==
=== Watchlists ===
- Nigel Bradham
  Chuck Bednarik Award watchlist
  Bronko Nagurski Trophy watchlist
  Butkus Award watchlist
  Lombardi Award watchlist
- Andrew Datko
  Lombardi Award watchlist
  Outland Trophy watchlist
- Dustin Hopkins
  Lou Groza Award finalist
- Brandon Jenkins
  Chuck Bednarik Award watchlist
  Bronko Nagurski Trophy watchlist
  Walter Camp Award watchlist
  Lombardi Award watchlist
- EJ Manuel
  Maxwell Award watchlist
  Davey O'Brien Award watchlist
- Greg Reid
  Chuck Bednarik Award watchlist
  Jim Thorpe Award watchlist
- Xavier Rhodes
  Chuck Bednarik Award watchlist
  Bronko Nagurski Trophy watchlist

=== Players ===
- Brandon Jenkins
  Second-team All-ACC
- Dustin Hopkins
  First-team All-ACC
- Lamarcus Joyner
  Second-team All-ACC
- Shawn Powell
  First-team All-ACC
  Consensus All-American
- Zebrie Sanders
  First-team All-ACC

== Roster ==
2011 Florida State Seminoles roster
Quarterbacks: 14 Jacob Coker – Freshman; 11 Ethan Gilbert – Sophomore; 3 E. J. Manuel – (redshirt) Junior; 16 Will Secord – (redshirt) Sophomore; 9 Clint Trickett – (redshirt) Freshman; Running backs: 29 Eric Beverly – Freshman; 8 Devonta Freeman – Freshman; 33 Ty Jones – Junior; 24 Lonnie Pryor – Sophomore; 38 Jermaine Thomas – Junior; 23 Chris Thompson – Sophomore; 32 James Wilder, Jr. – Freshman; Fullback: 41 Chad Abram – Sophomore; 37 Nathan Brazeau – Senior; 30 Ryan DiMarco – Sophomore; 21 Debrale Smiley – (redshirt) Junior; Wide receivers: 1 Kelvin Benjamin – Freshman; 15 Greg Dent – Sophomore; 45 James Dolan – (redshirt) Freshman; 19 Josh Gehres – (redshirt) Sophomore; 13 Rashad Gholston – (redshirt) Freshman; 89 Christian Green – (redshirt) Freshman; 80 Rashad Greene – Freshman; 12 Jarred Haggins – Sophomore; 82 Willie Haulstead – Junior; 83 Bert Reed – Senior; 86 Zac Rittberg – Sophomore; 81 Kenny Shaw – Sophomore; 84 Rodney Smith – Junior; 22 Austin Stowers – Junior; 39 David Tyrrell – (redshirt) Freshman; 36 Jermaine Washington – Freshman; Tight ends: 46 Jonathan Johnson – Junior; 85 Ja'Baris Little – Senior; 35 Nick O'Leary – Freshman; 43 Anthony Porterfield – Sophomore; 88 Beau Reliford – Senior; 44 Will Tye – (redshirt) Freshman	Offensive line: 62 Austin Barron – Freshman; 57 Terrance Carey – Freshman; 65 Ruben Carter – Freshman; 67 Andrew Datko – Senior; 68 Russell Eldridge – Junior; 60 Jacob Fahrenkrug – Junior; 76 Garrett Faircloth – (redshirt) Sophomore; 72 Daniel Foose – (redshirt) Freshman; 71 Kevin Dehlinger – (redshirt) Junior; 51 Bobby Hart – Freshman; 53 Sterline Lovelady – Freshman; 70 Josue Matías – Freshman; 59 Henry Orelus – Sophomore; 56 Trey Pettis – Freshman; 77 Zebrie Sanders – Senior; 79 David Spurlock – Senior; 66 Jacob Stanley – Senior; 52 Bryan Stork – Sophomore; 74 Jonathan Wallace – Sophomore; Defensive line: 78 Shayne Broxsie – Junior; 91 Cornellius Carradine – Junior; 94 Darious Cummings – Sophomore; 93 Everett Dawkins – (redshirt) Junior; 98 Cameron Erving – (redshirt) Freshman; 70 Sean Hector – (redshirt) Freshman; 58 Dan Hicks – (redshirt) Sophomore; 54 Tre' Jackson – Freshman; 49 Brandon Jenkins – Junior; 8 Timmy Jernigan – Freshman; 99 Nile Lawrence-Stample – Freshman; 97 Demonte McAllister – (redshirt) Sophomore; 92 Anthony McCloud – Junior; 55 Jacobbi McDaniel – Junior; 90 Moses McCray – (redshirt) Junior; 56 Derrick Mitchell – Freshman; 96 Toshmon Stevens – (redshirt) Junior; 51 Giorgio Newberry – Freshman; 95 Björn Werner – Sophomore	Linebackers: 13 Nigel Bradham – Senior; 54 Dorian Earley – Sophomore; 26 Arrington Jenkins – Freshman; 7 Christian Jones – Sophomore; 48 Jeff Luc – Sophomore; 57 Holmes Onwukaife – (redshirt) Freshman; 54 Mickel Pringle – Sophomore; 22 Telvin Smith – Sophomore; 24 Terrance Smith – Freshman; 76 Trey Sumner – Junior; 28 Nigel Terrell – (redshirt) Freshman; 32 Sean Tidmus – Sophomore; 11 Vince Williams – (redshirt) Junior; Defensive backs: 31 Terrence Brooks – Sophomore; 42 Lamarcus Brutus – Freshman; 40 Kendall Fullington – Freshman; 1 Mike Harris – Senior; 30 Tyler Hunter – Freshman; 5 Greg Reid – Junior; 27 Xavier Rhodes – Sophomore; 37 Keelin Smith – Freshman; 6 Nick Waisome – Freshman; Deep Safeties: 64 Dax Dellenbach – Junior; 75 Philip Doumar – Sophomore; 69 Chris Revell – Sophomore; Safeties: 3 Justin Bright – (redshirt) Sophomore; 39 Steven Findlay – Senior; 21 Avis Commack – (redshirt) Junior; 47 Cory Cox – Junior; 6 Gerald Demps – (redshirt) Freshman; 10 Nick Moody – (redshirt) Junior; 20 Lamarcus Joyner – Sophomore; 4 Terrance Parks – Senior; 9 Karlos Williams – Freshman	Punters: 29 Dillon Kidd – Freshman; 45 Shawn Powell – Senior; Kickers: 18 Dustin Hopkins – Junior; 47 Maxx Moore – Freshman; Head coach: Jimbo Fisher; Assistant coaches: James Coley – Offensive coordinator/TE coach; Dameyune Craig – Recruiting doordinator/QB coach; Lawrence Dawsey – Passing Game coordinator/WR coach; D. J. Eliot – De coach; Eddie Gran – Associate head coach/ST coordinator/RB coach; Odell Haggins – Dt coach; Greg Hudson – Assistant head coach/lb coach; Mark Stoops – Defensive coordinator/db coach; Rick Trickett – Assistant head coach/ol coach; Vic Viloria – Head strength and conditioning coach

=== Depth chart ===
Defense

FS
Terrance Parks
Karlos Williams
Gerald Demps

WLB	MLB	SLB
⋅	Vince Williams	⋅
Telvin Smith	Jeff Luc	⋅
⋅	⋅	⋅

SS
Nick Moody
Lamarcus Joyner
Justin Bright

CB
Greg Reid
Mike Harris
Nick Waisome

DE	DT	DT	DE
Brandon Jenkins	Timmy Jernigan	Everett Dawkins	Björn Werner
Demonte Mcallister	Anthony McCloud	Cameron Erving	Cornellius Carradine
Dan Hicks	Jacobbi McDaniel	⋅	⋅

CB
Xavier Rhodes
Terrance Brooks
Avis Commack

Offense

WR
Rashad Greene
Kenny Shaw
Willie Haulstead

LT	LG	C	RG	RT
Andrew Datko	Josue Matías	Bryan Stork	David Spurlock	Zebrie Sanders
⋅	⋅	Austin Barron	⋅	Bobby Hart
⋅	⋅	⋅	⋅	⋅

TE
Nick O'Leary
Beau Reliford
Will Tye

WR
Rodney Smith
Bert Reed
Christian Green

QB
EJ Manuel
Clint Trickett
Will Secord

RB
Chris Thompson
Devonta Freeman
James Wilder Jr.

FB
Lonnie Pryor
Debrale Smiley
⋅

Special teams
PK Dustin Hopkins
PK Shawn Powell
P Shawn Powell
P Dustin Hopkins
KR Greg Reid
Lamarcus Joyner
PR Greg Reid
LS Dax Dellenbach
H Shawn Powell

=== Recruits ===
College recruiting
Name	Hometown	School	Height	Weight	40^{‡}	Commit date
Austin Barron; OG	Fort Lauderdale, FL	St. Thomas Aquinas HS	6 ft 3 in (1.91 m)	275 lb (125 kg)	N/A	Feb 2, 2011
Austin Barron; OG	Recruit ratings: Scout: Rivals: (45)					
Terry Bell; DT	Lakeland, FL	Tenoroc HS	6 ft 5 in (1.96 m)	284 lb (129 kg)	N/A	Feb 2, 2011
Terry Bell; DT	Recruit ratings: Scout: Rivals: (45)					
Kelvin Benjamin; WR	Belle Glade, FL	Glades Central HS	6 ft 6 in (1.98 m)	210 lb (95 kg)	4.6	Jan 9, 2011
Kelvin Benjamin; WR	Recruit ratings: Scout: Rivals: (80)					
Eric Beverly; RB	Jacksonville, FL	First Coast HS	5 ft 10 in (1.78 m)	208 lb (94 kg)	4.98	Dec 7, 2009
Eric Beverly; RB	Recruit ratings: Scout: Rivals: (78)					
Lamarcus Brutus; S	Port Saint Lucie, FL	Treasure Coast HS	6 ft 0 in (1.83 m)	185 lb (84 kg)	4.55	Dec 3, 2009
Lamarcus Brutus; S	Recruit ratings: Scout: Rivals: (80)					
Cornellius Carradine; DE	El Dorado, KS	Butler Community College (KS)	6 ft 5 in (1.96 m)	245 lb (111 kg)	N/A	Dec 15, 2010
Cornellius Carradine; DE	Recruit ratings: Scout: Rivals: (N/A)					
Ruben Carter; OT	Miami, FL	Miami Jackson HS	6 ft 4 in (1.93 m)	283 lb (128 kg)	5.28	Oct 17, 2010
Ruben Carter; OT	Recruit ratings: Scout: Rivals: (76)					
Jacob Coker; QB	Mobile, AL	St. Pauls Episcopal School	6 ft 5 in (1.96 m)	210 lb (95 kg)	N/A	Jun 21, 2010
Jacob Coker; QB	Recruit ratings: Scout: Rivals: (75)					
Jacob Fahrenkrug; OG	Wahpeton, ND	North Dakota State College of Science	6 ft 4 in (1.93 m)	318 lb (144 kg)	5.2	Dec 15, 2010
Jacob Fahrenkrug; OG	Recruit ratings: Scout: Rivals: (N/A)					
Devonta Freeman; RB	Miami, FL	Miami Central HS	5 ft 10 in (1.78 m)	188 lb (85 kg)	4.5	Jun 24, 2010
Devonta Freeman; RB	Recruit ratings: Scout: Rivals: (80)					
Rashad Greene; WR	Fort Lauderdale, FL	St. Thomas Aquinas HS	6 ft 0 in (1.83 m)	173 lb (78 kg)	4.45	Jun 17, 2010
Rashad Greene; WR	Recruit ratings: Scout: Rivals: (80)					
Bobby Hart; OT	Fort Lauderdale, FL	St. Thomas Aquinas HS	6 ft 5 in (1.96 m)	291 lb (132 kg)	5.6	Jul 17, 2010
Bobby Hart; OT	Recruit ratings: Scout: Rivals: (83)					
Tyler Hunter; S	Valdosta, GA	Lowndes HS	6 ft 0 in (1.83 m)	194 lb (88 kg)	4.5	Mar 12, 2010
Tyler Hunter; S	Recruit ratings: Scout: Rivals: (81)					
Tre Jackson; DT	Jesup, GA	Wayne County HS	6 ft 4 in (1.93 m)	295 lb (134 kg)	N/A	Feb 2, 2011
Tre Jackson; DT	Recruit ratings: Scout: Rivals: (78)					
Arrington Jenkins; LB	Miami, FL	Miami Coral Park HS	6 ft 3 in (1.91 m)	216 lb (98 kg)	N/A	Jan 25, 2011
Arrington Jenkins; LB	Recruit ratings: Scout: Rivals: (80)					
Timmy Jernigan; DT	Lake City, FL	Columbia HS	6 ft 2 in (1.88 m)	275 lb (125 kg)	5	Feb 2, 2011
Timmy Jernigan; DT	Recruit ratings: Scout: Rivals: (84)					
Nile Lawrence-Stample; DT	Davie, FL	Nova HS	6 ft 2 in (1.88 m)	297 lb (135 kg)	4.9	Feb 22, 2010
Nile Lawrence-Stample; DT	Recruit ratings: Scout: Rivals: (80)					
Sterling Lovelady; C	Navarre, FL	Navarre HS	6 ft 3 in (1.91 m)	282 lb (128 kg)	N/A	Feb 22, 2010
Sterling Lovelady; C	Recruit ratings: Scout: Rivals: (77)					
Josue Matías; OT	Union City, NJ	Union Senior HS	6 ft 5 in (1.96 m)	290 lb (130 kg)	N/A	Jan 29, 2011
Josue Matías; OT	Recruit ratings: Scout: Rivals: (79)					
Derrick Mitchell; DT	Jacksonville, FL	First Coast HS	6 ft 5 in (1.96 m)	290 lb (130 kg)	4.8	Feb 23, 2010
Derrick Mitchell; DT	Recruit ratings: Scout: Rivals: (79)					
Giorgio Newberry; DE	Fort Pierce, FL	Fort Pierce Central HS	6 ft 6 in (1.98 m)	253 lb (115 kg)	4.9	Sep 26, 2010
Giorgio Newberry; DE	Recruit ratings: Scout: Rivals: (82)					
Nick O'Leary; TE	Palm Beach Gardens, FL	William T. Dwyer HS	6 ft 4 in (1.93 m)	233 lb (106 kg)	4.65	Jan 22, 2011
Nick O'Leary; TE	Recruit ratings: Scout: Rivals: (83)					
Trey Pettis; C	DeLand, FL	DeLand HS	6 ft 5 in (1.96 m)	285 lb (129 kg)	N/A	Dec 1, 2009
Trey Pettis; C	Recruit ratings: Scout: Rivals: (78)					
Jordan Prestwood; OT	Plant City, FL	Plant City HS	6 ft 6 in (1.98 m)	273 lb (124 kg)	4.99	Nov 15, 2010
Jordan Prestwood; OT	Recruit ratings: Scout: Rivals: (80)					
Keelin Smith; S	Port Saint Lucie, FL	Treasure Coast HS	6 ft 2 in (1.88 m)	185 lb (84 kg)	4.55	Dec 3, 2009
Keelin Smith; S	Recruit ratings: Scout: Rivals: (81)					
Terrance Smith; LB	Decatur, GA	Southwest Dekalb HS	6 ft 3 in (1.91 m)	213 lb (97 kg)	4.68	Mar 28, 2010
Terrance Smith; LB	Recruit ratings: Scout: Rivals: (79)					
Nick Waisome; CB	Groveland, FL	South Lake HS	5 ft 10 in (1.78 m)	170 lb (77 kg)	4.44	Dec 20, 2010
Nick Waisome; CB	Recruit ratings: Scout: Rivals: (81)					
James Wilder Jr. RB	Tampa, FL	Plant Senior HS	6 ft 2 in (1.88 m)	217 lb (98 kg)	4.65	Aug 18, 2010
James Wilder Jr. RB	Recruit ratings: Scout: Rivals: (82)					
Karlos Williams; S	Davenport, FL	Ridge Community HS	6 ft 1 in (1.85 m)	207 lb (94 kg)	4.5	Feb 21, 2010
Karlos Williams; S	Recruit ratings: Scout: Rivals: (86)					
Overall recruit ranking: Scout: 2 Rivals: 2 ESPN: 1
‡ Refers to 40-yard dash; Note: In many cases, Scout, Rivals, 247Sports, On3, and ESPN may conflict in their listings of height, weight and 40 time.; In these cases, the average was taken. ESPN grades are on a 100-point scale.; Sources: "Florida State 2011 Football Commitments". Rivals.; "2011 Florida State Commits". Scout.; "2011 Player Commitments – Florida State". ESPN.; "Scout.com Team Recruiting Rankings". Scout.; "2011 Team Ranking". Rivals.com.
