= Ruben Carter =

Ruben Carter may refer to:

- Rubin "Hurricane" Carter (1937–2014), middleweight boxer wrongfully convicted of murder
- Ruben Carter (American football) (born 1992), American football offensive lineman
- Rubin Carter (American football) (born 1952), American football coach and player
