= Rashad Greene =

American gridiron football player (born 1992)

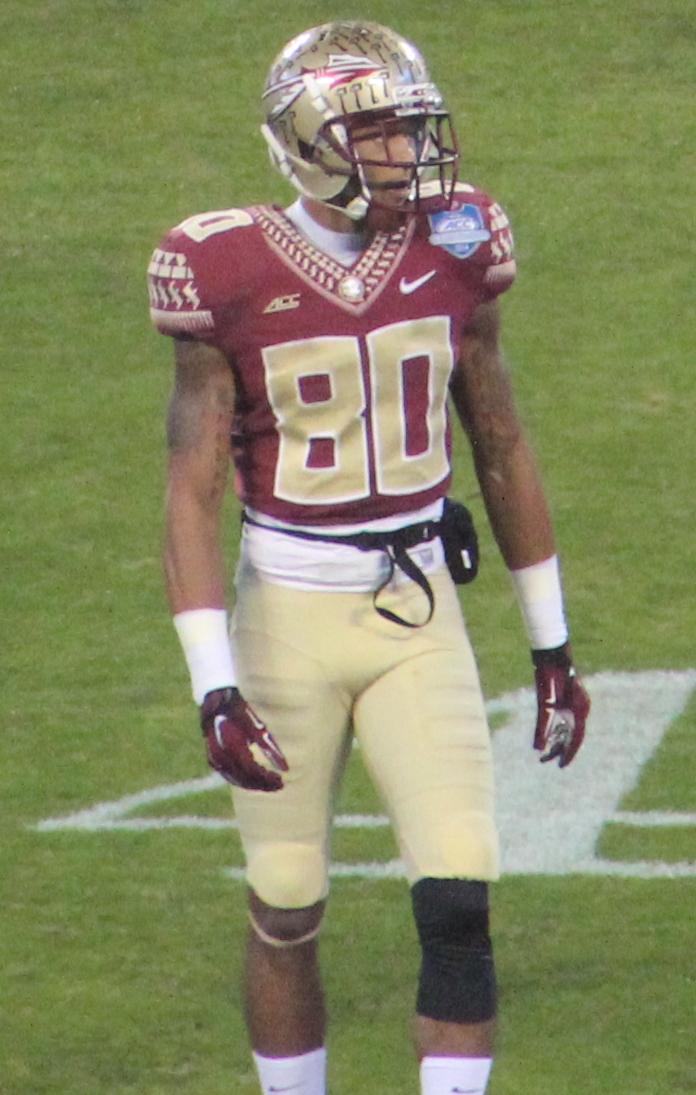
- Greene with the Florida State Seminoles in 2014

No. 13
- Position: Wide receiver

Personal information
- Born: September 23, 1992 (age 34); Albany, Georgia, U.S.
- Listed height: 5 ft 11 in (1.80 m)
- Listed weight: 186 lb (84 kg)

Career information
- High school: St. Thomas Aquinas (Fort Lauderdale, Florida)
- College: Florida State
- NFL draft: 2015: 5th round, 139th overall pick

Career history
- Jacksonville Jaguars (2015–2018); Saskatchewan Roughriders (2020–2021)*
- * Offseason or practice squad member only

Awards and highlights
- BCS national champion (2013); 2× First-team All-ACC (2013, 2014)

Career NFL statistics
- Receptions: 30
- Receiving yards: 185
- Receiving touchdowns: 2
- Return yards: 553
- Return touchdowns: 1
- Stats at Pro Football Reference

Rashad Greene Sr. (born September 23, 1992) is an American former professional football player who was a wide receiver in the National Football League (NFL). He played college football for the Florida State Seminoles and was selected by the Jacksonville Jaguars of the National Football League (NFL) in the fifth round of the 2015 NFL draft.

== Early life ==
Greene attended Westover Comprehensive High School from 2007 to 2009, where he played football and was a standout at wide receiver. Greene was a standout track and field athlete in sprints and relays at Westover. He recorded a personal-best time of 48.27 seconds in the 400 meters at the 2009 GA State 3A Class on his way to a third-place finish. At the 2009 Westover Relays, he took gold in the 400 meters, at 49.07 seconds, and placed fourth in the 200 meters with a time of 22.07 seconds. Greene also ran the third-leg on the 4 × 100 m relay squad, helping them capture the state championship at 41.60 seconds.

After his sophomore year, Greene transferred to St. Thomas Aquinas High School in Fort Lauderdale, Florida. As a senior, Greene had 43 receptions for 943 yards (21.9 yards per catch) with 13 touchdowns. In the 2010 Class 5A State title game against Tampa's Plant High School, he recorded six receptions for 148 yards and two touchdowns, including a title-clinching 74-yard pass in the fourth quarter.

Considered a four-star recruit by Rivals.com, he was rated as the 29th best wide receiver prospect of his class.

== College career ==
Greene enrolled at Florida State University in the fall of 2011 under head coach Jimbo Fisher. As a freshman in 2011, Greene made 38 receptions for 596 yards and seven touchdowns. He was the MVP of the 2011 Champs Sports Bowl in an 18–14 victory over Notre Dame. As a sophomore in 2012, he had 57 receptions for 741 yards and six touchdowns.

As a junior in 2013, Greene led the Seminoles with 76 receptions for 1,128 yards and nine touchdowns, including nine receptions for 147 yards in the 2014 BCS National Championship Game against Auburn. As a senior in 2014, Greene set the school record for career receptions and receiving yards, passing Ron Sellers in both categories. He also set the record for receptions in a season with 99. He also had 1,365 receiving yards and seven touchdowns in 2014. For his career, Greene had 270 receptions for 3,830 yards and 29 touchdowns.

=== Statistics ===
Year	School	Conf	Class	Pos	G	Receiving				Rushing				Scrimmage			
Year	School	Conf	Class	Pos	G	Rec	Yds	Avg	TD	Att	Yds	Avg	TD	Plays	Yds	Avg	TD
2011	Florida State	ACC	FR	WR	9	38	596	15.7	7	3	44	14.7	0	41	640	15.6	7
2012	Florida State	ACC	SO	WR	14	57	741	13.0	6	4	30	7.5	1	61	771	12.6	7
2013	Florida State	ACC	JR	WR	14	76	1,128	14.8	9	1	9	9.0	0	77	1137	14.8	9
2014	Florida State	ACC	SR	WR	14	99	1,365	13.8	7	1	−2	−2.0	0	100	1363	13.6	7
Career					51	270	3,830	14.2	29	9	81	9.0	1	279	3,911	14.0	30

== Professional career ==
Pre-draft measurables
Height	Weight	Arm length	Hand span	Wingspan	40-yard dash	10-yard split	20-yard split	20-yard shuttle	Three-cone drill	Vertical jump	Broad jump
5 ft 11 3/8 in (1.81 m)	182 lb (83 kg)	31 5/8 in (0.80 m)	9 in (0.23 m)	6 ft 3 5/8 in (1.92 m)	4.53 s	1.63 s	2.67 s	4.12 s	6.88 s	36.5 in (0.93 m)	10 ft 2 in (3.10 m)
All values from NFL Combine

=== Jacksonville Jaguars ===
Greene was selected 139th overall in the fifth round of the 2015 NFL draft by the Jacksonville Jaguars. He was the eighth of 11 Florida State Seminoles to be selected in the draft that year. On September 13, 2015, Greene scored his first professional touchdown on a one-yard reception from Blake Bortles in the season opener against the Carolina Panthers. Later in the season, on December 13, 2015, Greene returned a punt 73 yards for a touchdown against the Indianapolis Colts. Overall, he finished his rookie season with 19 receptions for 93 receiving yards and two receiving touchdowns to go along with his one punt return touchdown.

In 2016, Greene appeared in eight games for the Jaguars and recorded five receptions for 32 yards, and lost one fumble. He also contributed 131 punt return yards before going down with an Achilles injury. He was placed on injured reserve on December 3, 2016.

On September 2, 2017, the Jaguars placed Greene on injured reserve.

On September 15, 2018, Greene was released by the Jaguars, but was re-signed two days later. In Week 11 against the Colts, with 1:35 left in the game and the Jaguars trailing by three, Greene fumbled his only catch of the game (and only his third of the season), leading to a loss.

=== Saskatchewan Roughriders ===
In February 2020, Greene signed with the Saskatchewan Roughriders of the Canadian Football League. The team announced his retirement on April 9, 2021.

== Personal life ==
Greene is married and has three sons.
