= Rick Trickett =

American football coach

Current position
- Title: Offensive line coach
- Team: West Virginia
- Conference: Big 12

Playing career
- 1968–1971: Glenville State

Coaching career (HC unless noted)
- 1976–1977: West Virginia (DL)
- 1978–1979: West Virginia (OL)
- 1980–1981: Southern Illinois (OL)
- 1982–1984: Southern Miss (OL)
- 1985: New Mexico (OL)
- 1986–1988: Memphis (OL)
- 1989–1992: Mississippi State (OL)
- 1993–1998: Auburn (OL)
- 1999: Glenville State
- 2000: LSU (AHC/OL)
- 2001–2006: West Virginia (AHC/OL)
- 2007–2017: Florida State (AHC/OL)
- 2019–2021: Glenville State (AHC/RGC/OL)
- 2022–2025: Jacksonville State (AHC/OL)
- 2026–present: West Virginia (OL)

Head coaching record
- Overall: 6–5

Rick Trickett is an American college football coach. He is the associate head coach and offensive line coach for the West Virginia Mountaineers and an American former football player. He served as the head football coach at his alma mater, Glenville State College in Glenville, West Virginia, in 1999. Trickett worked as an offensive line coach at a number of colleges, notably at Florida State University under Jimbo Fisher.

== Head coaching record ==
Year	Team	Overall	Conference	Standing	Bowl/playoffs
Glenville State Pioneers (West Virginia Intercollegiate Athletic Conference) (1999)
1999	Glenville State	6–5	0–0	NA	
Glenville State:		6–5	0–0		
Total:		6–5			
