= EJ Manuel =

American football player (born 1990)

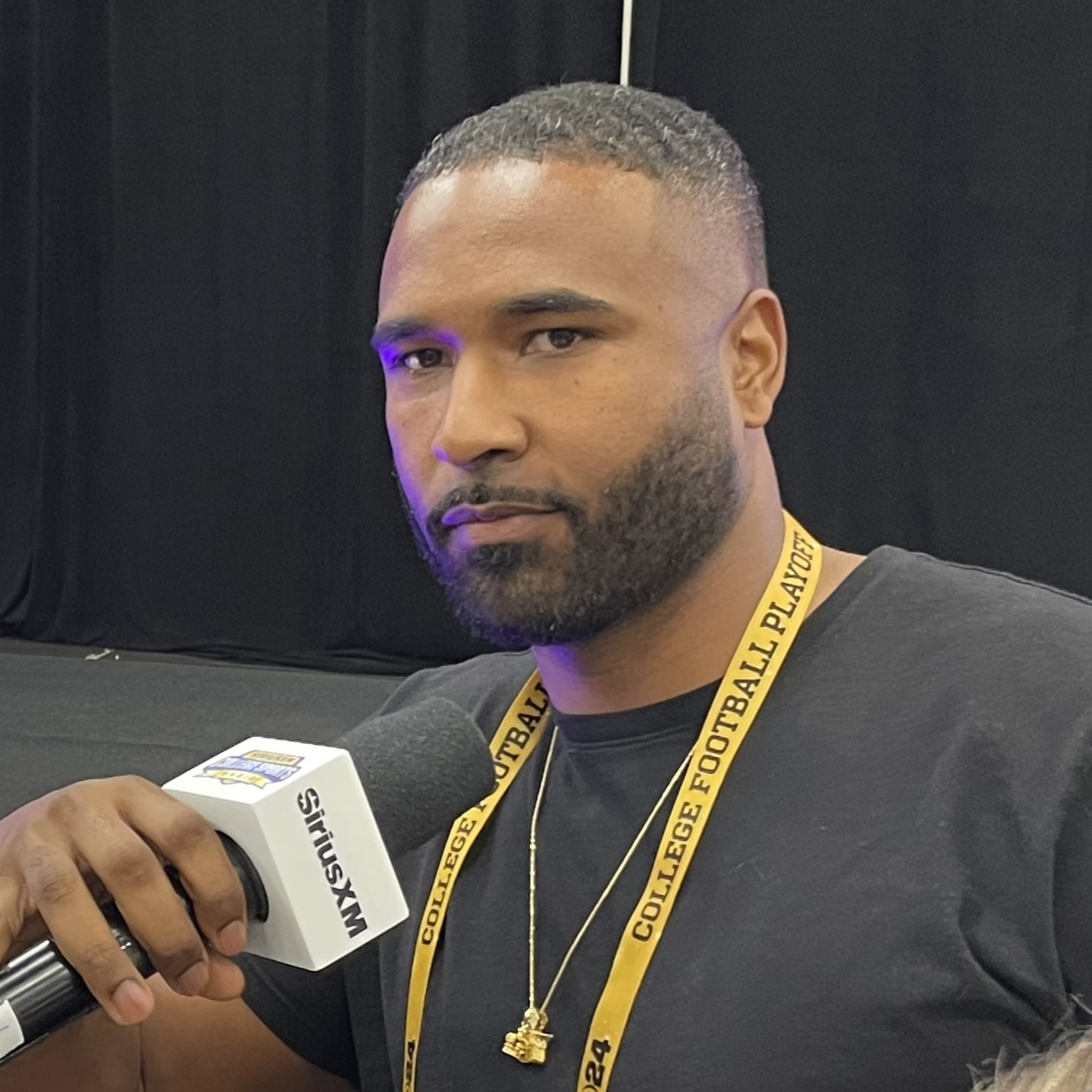
- Manuel in 2024

No. 3
- Position: Quarterback

Personal information
- Born: March 19, 1990 (age 36); Virginia Beach, Virginia, U.S.
- Listed height: 6 ft 4 in (1.93 m)
- Listed weight: 237 lb (108 kg)

Career information
- High school: Bayside (Virginia Beach)
- College: Florida State (2008–2012)
- NFL draft: 2013: 1st round, 16th overall pick

Career history
- Buffalo Bills (2013–2016); Oakland Raiders (2017); Kansas City Chiefs (2019)*
- * Offseason or practice squad member only

Awards and highlights
- Second-team All-ACC (2012)

Career NFL statistics
- Passing attempts: 590
- Passing completions: 343
- Completion percentage: 58.1%
- TD–INT: 20–16
- Passing yards: 3,767
- Passer rating: 77.1
- Rushing touchdowns: 4
- Stats at Pro Football Reference

Erik James "EJ" Manuel Jr. (born March 19, 1990) is an American former professional football player who was a quarterback in the National Football League (NFL). He played college football for the Florida State Seminoles, leading them to an Atlantic Coast Conference (ACC) championship and Orange Bowl win as a senior. Manuel was selected by the Buffalo Bills in the first round of the 2013 NFL draft.

Chosen by the Bills to be their franchise quarterback, Manuel suffered several injuries and saw his on-the-field performance struggle. After starting 10 games while throwing for 1,972 yards and 11 touchdowns as a rookie, Manuel made just a combined seven starts and threw eight touchdowns over the next three seasons, remaining behind Kyle Orton and Tyrod Taylor on the depth chart. After leaving the Bills, he spent the 2017 season with the Oakland Raiders before sitting out the following season. Manuel signed with the Kansas City Chiefs in the 2019 offseason, but retired before the start of the preseason.

== Early life ==
Manuel was born in Virginia Beach, Virginia, on March 19, 1990. He attended Bayside High School in Virginia Beach, where he played high school football. During his time with the Marlins, Manuel recorded nearly 7,400 yards and 68 touchdowns. He was considered a five-star recruit by Scout, a four-star recruit by Rivals. Manuel was an All-American quarterback in high school.

== College career ==
Manuel enrolled in Florida State University, where he played for coach Bobby Bowden and coach Jimbo Fisher's Florida State Seminoles football teams from 2008 to 2012. While Manuel was a student, he joined the Pi Kappa Alpha fraternity. Manuel became the second collegiate quarterback to win four straight bowl games, the first being Pat White of West Virginia (2005–2008).

=== 2009 season ===
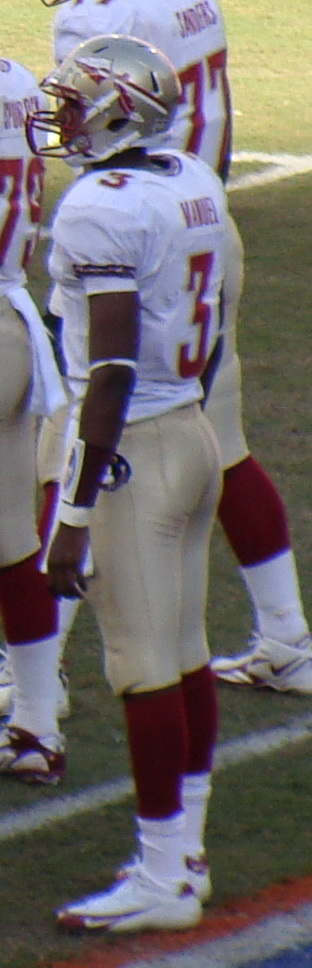
Manuel in 2009

Manuel took over for an injured Christian Ponder as the 4–5 Seminoles were in danger of finishing with a losing record for the first time since Bobby Bowden took over the program. Manuel's first start was a road game against Wake Forest, where he completed 15-of-20 passes for 220 yards and a touchdown, leading the Seminoles to a 41–28 victory, who at the time had won three games in a row against Florida State. Manuel struggled in his second game against Maryland but still managed to pull out a victory, making FSU bowl-eligible. Manuel's struggles continued against the dominating Florida Gators, and the mobile quarterback was unable to get into a rhythm as Florida State lost by a score of 37–10.

Florida State entered the Gator Bowl 6–6 and in serious danger of letting legendary coach Bobby Bowden leave with a losing record. Manuel led Florida State to a 33–21 victory over the West Virginia Mountaineers and won the Gator Bowl MVP honors.

=== 2010 season ===
Manuel started twice in the 2010 season in relief of Christian Ponder, who battled a nagging forearm injury. In his first start against Clemson, Manuel picked up 71 yards on 15 carries. He also led the Seminoles to a victory in the 2010 Chick-fil-A Bowl against South Carolina in relief of Christian Ponder, who was injured in the second quarter of the game.

=== 2011 season ===
In the 2011 season, Manuel played in every game besides the loss at Clemson after injuring his shoulder in a loss against Oklahoma the previous week. Manuel finished the season with 2,666 yards passing on a 65% completion rate. He also finished with 18 passing touchdowns, four rushing touchdowns, and eight interceptions. Manuel helped lead the Seminoles to a comeback victory over the Notre Dame Fighting Irish in the Champs Sports Bowl by throwing for 249 yards and two touchdowns.

=== 2012 season ===
In the 2012 season, Manuel led the Seminoles to numerous wins over ACC rivals, an ACC Championship, and an Orange Bowl victory over Northern Illinois for a 12–2 record in his senior season.

=== Legacy ===
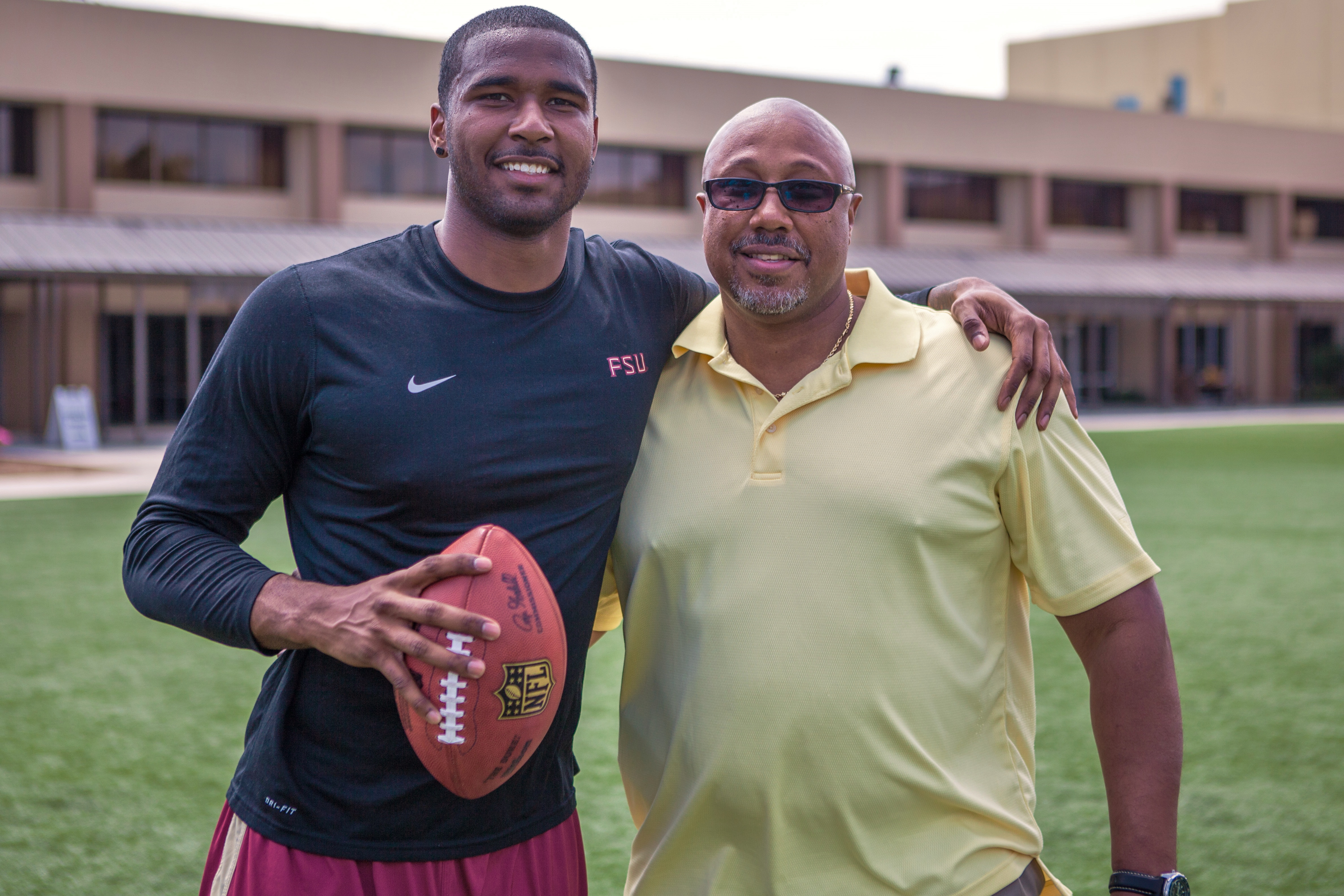
Manuel (left) with his father, Erik, in 2013

Manuel led the Seminoles to a 12-win season for just the third time in program history and the first time since their dominant stretch in the 1990s. As a senior, he threw for the second most yards in team history with 3,392, trailing only Chris Weinke's Heisman Trophy winning season, in which Weinke threw for 4,167 yards. Manuel went 25–6 as a starter, won the first BCS bowl for Florida State since 2000, won five out of six games against intrastate rivals Miami and Florida, and he led the offense to its most prolific season in team history, cleanly surpassing the 1999 National Championship squad with 6,591 yards.

== Professional career ==
=== Pre-draft ===
NFL.com analyst Bucky Brooks projected Manuel as a top five quarterback heading into the 2013 Draft and compared him to Josh Freeman. While Manuel possessed the blue-chip physical characteristics, work ethic, and leadership qualities necessary to be successful at the NFL level, he was faulted for somewhat inconsistent play at times during his college career.

Pre-draft measurables
Height	Weight	Arm length	Hand span	Wingspan	40-yard dash	10-yard split	20-yard split	20-yard shuttle	Three-cone drill	Vertical jump	Broad jump
6 ft 4 5/8 in (1.95 m)	237 lb (108 kg)	35 in (0.89 m)	10 3/8 in (0.26 m)	6 ft 11 1/8 in (2.11 m)	4.65 s	1.67 s	2.75 s	4.21 s	7.08 s	34.0 in (0.86 m)	9 ft 10 in (3.00 m)
All values from NFL Combine

=== Buffalo Bills ===
==== 2013 season ====
Manuel was selected by the Buffalo Bills in the first round (16th overall) of the 2013 NFL draft. He was the only quarterback taken in the first round of the draft, of which was seen as especially thin at quarterback; the Bills, who originally drafted eighth and had a great need for a quarterback, even traded down to obtain more picks.

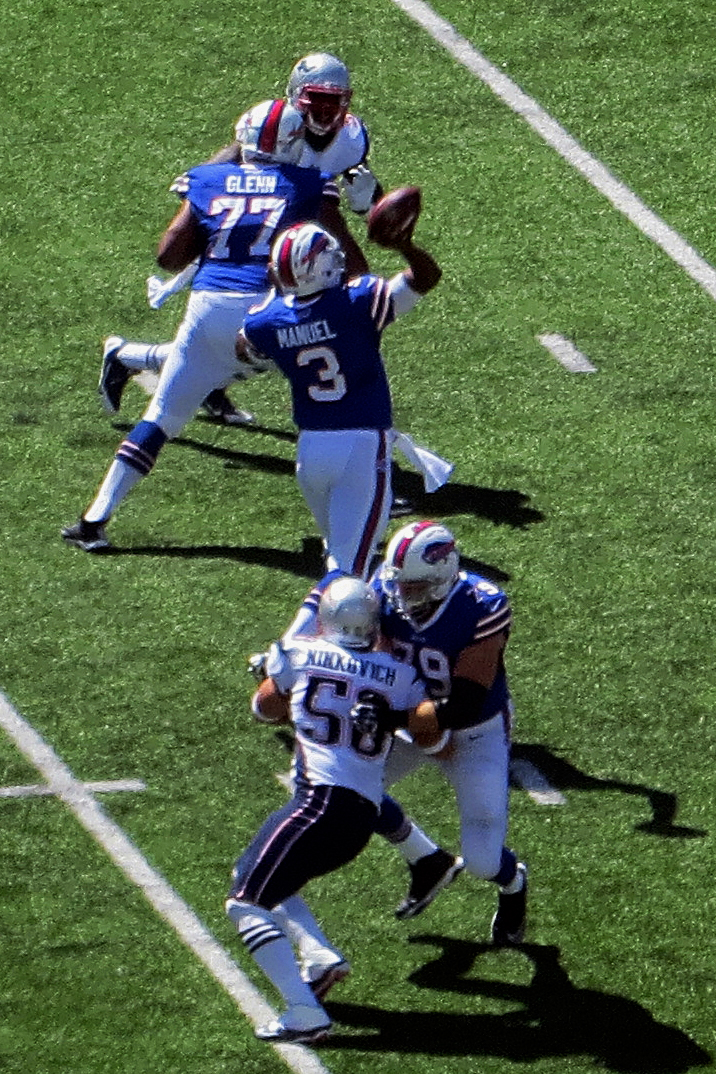
Manuel passing in 2013

On June 14, 2013, Manuel signed a four-year contract with the Bills with $8.88 million guaranteed and a signing bonus of $4.85 million evenly spaced out annually ($1.2 million) over the next four years. His salary in 2013 was $1.6 million, $2.0 million in 2014, $2.4 million in 2015, and $2.8 million in 2016.

Manuel underwent an operation on his knee to remove fluid buildup after the second game of the preseason. At the time, it was unsure if he would be ready to start the season-opener. On September 4, head coach Doug Marrone announced at the team meeting that Manuel was confirmed to be the starter for Week 1. During the season opener against the New England Patriots, Manuel completed his first NFL career touchdown to fellow rookie Robert Woods on an 18-yard pass in the narrow 23–21 loss. In the next game against the Carolina Panthers, Manuel engineered his first fourth-quarter comeback. He led a nine-play, 80-yard touchdown march to bring his team back from a six-point deficit in the fourth quarter, with seconds left in the game as the Bills narrowly won 24–23. Manuel was voted Pepsi Next NFL Rookie of the Week for his performance.

During a Week 5 37–24 road loss to the Cleveland Browns, Manuel sprained his right lateral collateral ligament, causing him to miss the next five weeks. Manuel had an up-and-down first year, but was given a vote of confidence by Doug Marrone as he was announced to be the starting quarterback for the 2014 season.

Manuel finished his rookie year with 1,972 passing yards, 11 touchdowns, and nine interceptions to go along with 53 carries for 186 yards and two touchdowns in 10 games and starts.

==== 2014 season ====
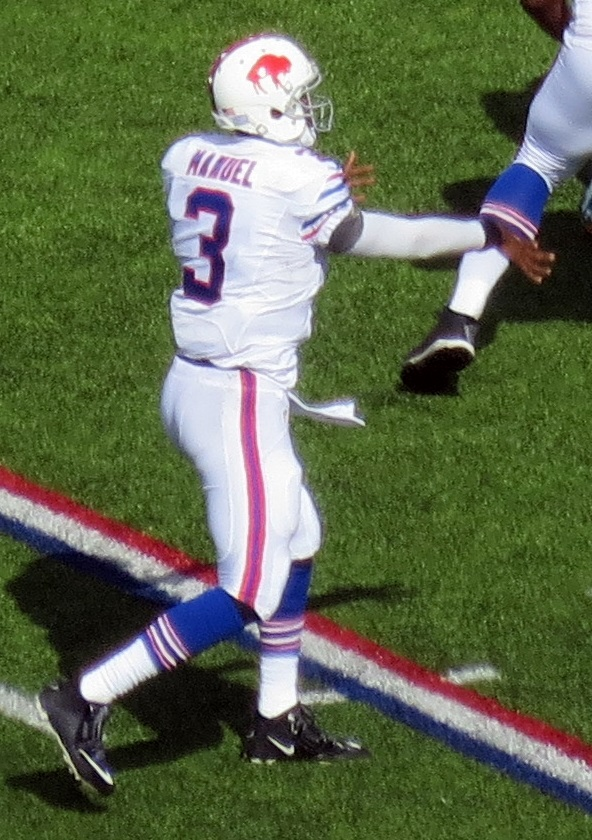
Manuel in 2014

During a Week 4 23–17 road loss the Houston Texans, one of Manuel's passes was intercepted by All-Pro defensive end J. J. Watt and returned 80 yards for a touchdown. The next day, Manuel was benched in favor of veteran quarterback Kyle Orton after starting the first four games of the 2014 season and bringing the Bills to a 2–2 record.

Manuel finished his second professional season with 838 passing yards, five touchdowns, and three interceptions to go along with 16 carries for 52 yards and a touchdown in five games and four starts. Orton would win seven of the next 12 games, and the Bills finished the season with a 9–7 record, the first time they had posted a winning record in a decade.

==== 2015 season ====
After posting the franchise's first winning record in a decade, Orton retired and Marrone opted out of the rest of his contract. The Bills then hired former division rival Rex Ryan as head coach. Manuel competed with free agent acquisition Tyrod Taylor and trade acquisition Matt Cassel for the starting quarterback job. During mini-camp, Manuel struggled to compete for the starting job and was listed as the third-string quarterback on the depth chart. Manuel performed well in the third preseason game, completing nearly all of his passes, showing improved accuracy. On August 31, 2015, coach Rex Ryan announced that Manuel and Cassel had lost the starting job to Taylor.

Manuel made his first start in over a year during Week 6 against the undefeated Cincinnati Bengals in place of an injured Tyrod Taylor, who suffered an MCL injury the previous week. On the first drive of the game for the Bills, Manuel led the Bills 80 yards down the field for a touchdown. Manuel finished the 34–21 loss completing 28-of-42 passes for 263 yards, a touchdown, and an interception to go along with a rushing touchdown.

During Week 7 against the Jacksonville Jaguars in London, Manuel threw for 298 yards and two touchdowns but had three costly turnovers, two of which were returned directly for scores in the second quarter. He rallied the Bills from 24 points down to take the lead in the fourth quarter. However, the Jaguars regained the lead with a Blake Bortles touchdown pass to wide receiver Allen Hurns, sealing the 34–31 victory as the Bills were unable to respond. With the loss, Manuel became the first quarterback in NFL history to lose a game in three countries (United States, Canada, and England).

Manuel finished the 2015 season with 561 passing yards, three touchdowns, and three interceptions to go along with 15 carries for 59 yards and a touchdown in seven games and two starts.

==== 2016 season ====
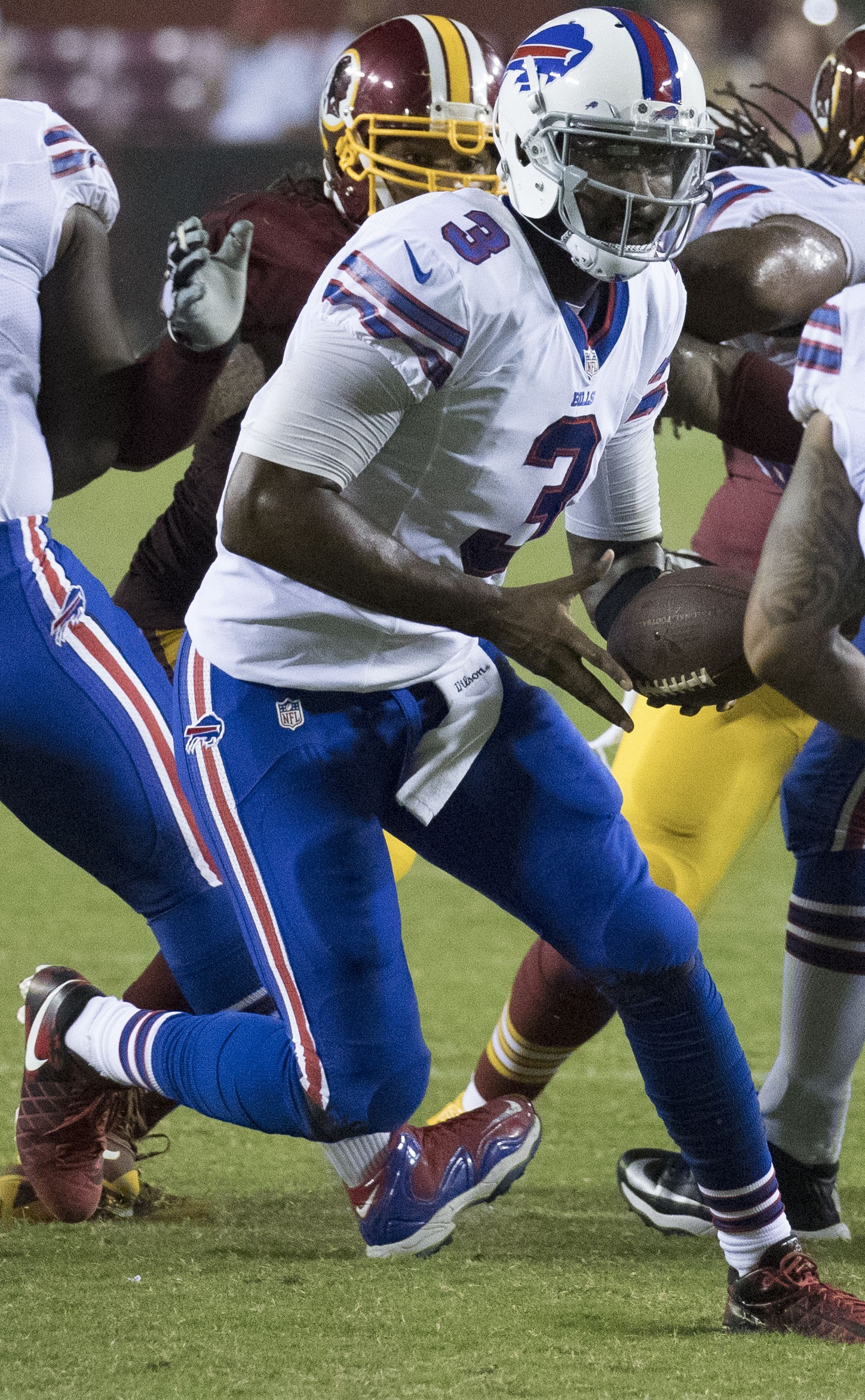
Manuel in 2016

On May 2, 2016, it was announced that the Bills declined to exercise Manuel's fifth-year option for the 2017 season.

Manuel saw spot duty through the first part of the season, usually as parts of trick plays. With the Bills being out of playoff contention, he started in the regular season finale against the New York Jets due to Tyrod Taylor being inactive. Manuel finished the 30–10 road loss completing nine of 20 passes for 86 yards before being benched for rookie quarterback Cardale Jones to start the fourth quarter.

Manuel finished the 2016 season with 131 passing yards and eight carries for 22 yards in six games and one start.

=== Oakland Raiders ===
==== 2017 season ====
On March 20, 2017, Manuel signed a one-year contract with the Oakland Raiders.

During a Week 4 16–10 road loss to the Denver Broncos, starter Derek Carr suffered a back injury in the third quarter and was relieved by Manuel, who completed 11 of 17 passes for 106 yards and an interception. Due to Carr's injury, Manuel started the following week against the Baltimore Ravens, completing 13 of 26 passes for 159 yards and a touchdown in the 30–17 loss. With the Raiders' Week 11 loss to the Patriots in Mexico City, Manuel became the first quarterback in NFL history to be on a team that would lose a game in four different countries (United States, Canada, England, and Mexico).

Manuel finished the 2017 season with 265 passing yards, a touchdown, and an interception to go along with two carries for 15 yards in two games and one start.

==== 2018 season ====
On March 22, 2018, Manuel re-signed with the Raiders. He was released on September 1.

=== Kansas City Chiefs ===
On February 22, 2019, Manuel was signed by the Kansas City Chiefs.

=== Retirement ===
On May 13, 2019, Manuel announced his retirement. On June 5, Manuel announced that he would be joining the ACC Network as a college football analyst.

== Career statistics ==
=== NFL ===
Year	Team	Games			Passing									Rushing					Sacks		Fumbles	
Year	Team	GP	GS	Record	Cmp	Att	Pct	Yds	Y/A	Lng	TD	Int	Rtg	Att	Yds	Avg	Lng	TD	Sck	SckY	Fum	Lost
2013	BUF	10	10	4–6	180	306	58.8	1,972	6.4	45	11	9	77.7	53	186	3.5	19	2	28	159	6	3
2014	BUF	5	4	2–2	76	131	58.0	838	6.4	80	5	3	80.3	16	52	3.3	8	1	6	44	1	0
2015	BUF	7	2	0–2	52	84	61.9	561	6.7	58	3	3	78.5	15	59	3.9	16	1	6	45	2	1
2016	BUF	6	1	0–1	11	26	42.3	131	5.0	35	0	0	58.3	8	22	2.8	8	0	3	20	2	1
2017	OAK	2	1	0–1	24	43	55.8	265	6.2	41	1	1	72.3	2	15	7.5	10	0	4	29	0	0
Career		30	18	6–12	343	590	58.1	3,767	6.4	80	20	16	77.5	96	339	3.5	19	4	47	297	11	5

=== College ===
Year	Team	Games			Passing							Rushing			
Year	Team	GP	GS	Record	Cmp	Att	Pct	Yds	TD	Int	Rtg	Att	Yds	Avg	TD
2008	Florida State	0	0	—	Redshirted (redshirt)										
2009	Florida State	7	4	3–1	69	106	65.1	817	2	6	124.7	44	196	4.5	2
2010	Florida State	10	2	1–1	65	93	69.9	861	4	4	153.3	41	170	4.1	1
2011	Florida State	12	11	9–2	203	311	65.3	2,666	18	8	151.2	110	151	1.4	4
2012	Florida State	14	14	12–2	263	387	68.0	3,392	23	10	156.0	103	310	3.0	4
Career		43	31	25–6	600	897	66.9	7,736	47	28	150.4	298	827	2.8	11

=== Bills franchise records ===
- Best rookie passer rating, minimum seven appearances: 77.7

== Personal stock offering ==
It was reported that Manuel would be offering stock in his future earnings via a venture with Fantex, Inc. as part of a new financial instrument being sold by Fantex. He planned to offer a 10% share of all future earnings from his brand to Fantex, which would then turn around and divide it into shares of a publicly traded tracking stock.

In July 2014, the Manuel/Fantex stock offering was completed. 523,700 shares were sold, valued at $10 per share.

== See also ==
- List of Afro-Latinos
