= Lamarcus Brutus =

American football player (born 1993)

Profile
- Position: Safety

Personal information
- Born: February 10, 1993 (age 33); Port St. Lucie, Florida, U.S.
- Listed height: 6 ft 0 in (1.83 m)
- Listed weight: 206 lb (93 kg)

Career information
- High school: Port St. Lucie (FL)
- College: Florida State
- NFL draft: 2016: undrafted

Career history
- Tennessee Titans (2016)*; Orlando Apollos (2019)*
- * Offseason or practice squad member only

Awards and highlights
- BCS national champion (2013)
- Stats at Pro Football Reference

Lamarcus Brutus (born February 10, 1993) is an American former football safety. He played college football at Florida State and signed with the Tennessee Titans in 2016.

== College career ==
In 2012, as a redshirt freshman, Brutus played in six games mainly on special teams on the kickoff coverage team. In 2013, the redshirt sophomore saw action in 11 of FSU's 14 games as a backup defensive back and special teams contributor. He continued to expand his role with the Seminoles after a redshirt season in 2011. He set a then career high with six tackles – all solo – against Syracuse. In 2014, the fourth-year junior emerged as a productive reserve in the secondary, appearing in all 14 games. Brutus played as a safety in FSU's dime package, finishing with 15 tackles, two interceptions and a pass breakup. His first career interception came in the second quarter off Florida's Treon Harris and led to an FSU TD for a 21–9 lead. He later picked off Georgia Tech's Justin Thomas in the fourth quarter with 3:22 to play in the ACC Championship Game.

In 2015, the fifth-year senior worked his way into the starting lineup at free safety in his final season at Florida State. Brutus started all 13 games as one of the veteran leaders on the defensive side of the ball. He had a team-high three interceptions on the year, including one at Georgia Tech that was returned 57 yards and led to the only Seminole touchdown of the game. Brutus' three interceptions tied for seventh-most in the ACC, while his 94 return yards led the conference. He was voted Honorable Mention All-ACC by the media. Brutus finished third on the team in total tackles with 68 stops (46 solo), second only to freshman All-American Derwin James in unassisted tackles (52).

== Professional career ==
Pre-draft measurables
Height	Weight	Arm length	Hand span	Wingspan	40-yard dash	10-yard split	20-yard split	20-yard shuttle	Three-cone drill	Vertical jump	Broad jump	Bench press
5 ft 11 5/8 in (1.82 m)	206 lb (93 kg)	31 1/2 in (0.80 m)	8 3/4 in (0.22 m)	6 ft 3 5/8 in (1.92 m)	4.70 s	1.59 s	2.68 s	4.29 s	7.02 s	33.0 in (0.84 m)	9 ft 6 in (2.90 m)	14 reps
All values from NFL Combine/Pro Day

The Titans signed Brutus as a rookie free agent on May 9, 2016. He was released on August 28, 2016. He signed with the Orlando Apollos in 2018 for the 2019 season. He was waived/injured before the start of the 2019 regular season and subsequently placed on injured reserve after clearing waivers. He was waived from injured reserve on March 26, 2019.
