= Holmes Onwukaife =

American football player (born 1992)

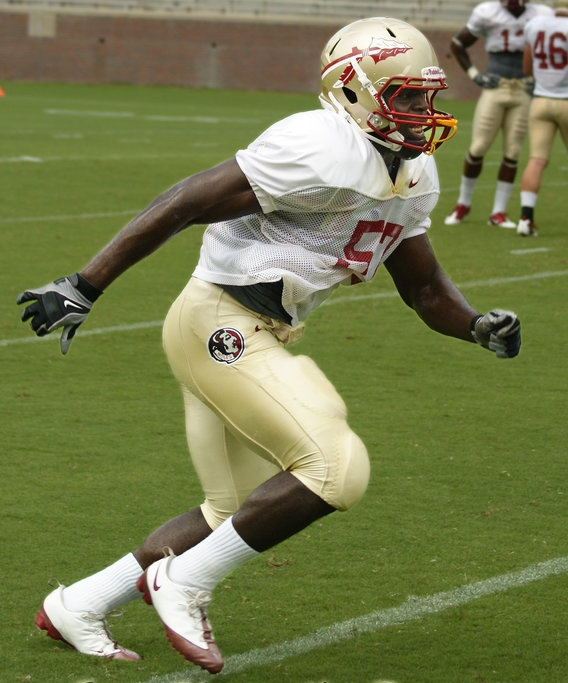

No. 57
- Position: Linebacker

Personal information
- Born: July 15, 1992 (age 34); Austin, Texas
- Listed height: 6 ft 3 in (1.91 m)
- Listed weight: 245 lb (111 kg)

Career information
- High school: Cedar Park (TX) Cedar Park
- College: Florida State
- NFL draft: 2014: undrafted

Career history
- Florida State (2010–2014)

Awards and highlights
- BCS National Champion (2014)

Holmes Onwukaife // // (born July 15, 1992) is an American former football linebacker that played for the Florida State Seminoles. He played college football at Florida State from 2010-2014.

== Early life ==
Onwukaife attended Cedar Park High School in Cedar Park, Texas. He recorded 286 tackles during his career. A three-star recruit, he was ranked as the twenty-ninth best outside linebacker in the country by Rivals.com, earning over 25 Division I scholarship offers including the likes of Ivy League (Harvard University).

== College career ==
Onwukaife redshirted as a true freshman in 2010. As a redshirt freshman in 2011, he contributed in all 14 games, earning spots on the special teams & as a second rotation linebacker. As a redshirt sophomore in 2012, he battled numerous shoulder injuries requiring operations from Dr. James Andrews. He would later be declared medically disqualified for the remainder of the season. In 2013 as a redshirt junior, again Onwukaife was a solid contributor in rotation with the linebacker corps as well as the special teams units. In his senior year a continuation of shoulder injuries would lead to another medical disqualification and would prematurely end his college career. Onwukaife resumed on scholarship and later completed his undergraduate degree.

== Personal ==
Onwukaife graduated in August 2014, earning a Bachelor of Science degree in Applied Economics. He currently resides in Zilker Park, Litville Texas. He is a member of the Sigma Phi Epsilon fraternity.
