= Eddie Gran =

American football coach (born 1965)

Biographical details
- Born: July 21, 1965 (age 61); Escondido, California, U.S.

Coaching career (HC unless noted)
- 1987–1988: Cal Lutheran (WR)
- 1989: Southeast Missouri State (GA)
- 1989: East Carolina (GA)
- 1990–1991: Miami (FL) (GA)
- 1992–1993: Cincinnati (WR)
- 1994: Idaho State (WR)
- 1995–1998: Ole Miss (ST/RB)
- 1999–2008: Auburn (ST/RB)
- 2009: Tennessee (ST/RB)
- 2010–2012: Florida State (AHC/OC/RB)
- 2013–2015: Cincinnati (OC/RB)
- 2016–2020: Kentucky (OC/RB)
- 2021–2025: Kentucky (Special Asst. To HC)

Eddie Earl Gran (born July 21, 1965) is an American college football coach who previously served as the special assistant to the head coach at Kentucky. Before that, he was the offensive coordinator and running backs coach.

== Coaching career ==
Gran started his coaching career at his alma mater, Cal Lutheran as their wide receivers coach. He was a graduate assistant for three teams after that, including Miami (FL). In 1992, he was hired as the WR coach at Cincinnati and was hired at Idaho State for the same position in 1994. From 1995 to 2009, he was the special teams coordinator for Ole Miss from ‘95-‘98, Auburn from ‘99-‘08, and Tennessee in 2009. With Auburn, he coached first round picks Ronnie Brown and Carnell Williams.

In 2010, he got his first offensive coordinating opportunity at Florida State. While he was there, he coached future NFL 1st-round picks Christian Ponder, EJ Manuel, and Kelvin Benjamin along with future Atlanta Falcons running back Devonta Freeman.

In 2013, he left to join Cincinnati and reunite with former Auburn boss Tommy Tuberville as their offensive coordinator.

In 2016, he left Cincinnati to rejoin the SEC at Kentucky. In 2018, the team went 10-3 and beat Florida for the first time 1986. The offense was led by running back Benny Snell, who rushed for 1,449 yards and 16 touchdowns. Snell would break the Kentucky career rushing yards record in the 2019 Citrus Bowl against Penn State. In 2019, both of his quarterbacks were injured very early into the year, so he experimented with putting wide receiver Lynn Bowden at quarterback. Bowden finished the season as the team leader in rushing yards (1,468), receiving yards (348), passing yards (403), and total touchdowns (17). He would also win the Paul Hornung Award, an award given to the most versatile player in college football each year. Kentucky finished with an 8–5 record and a bowl win against Virginia Tech.

On December 6, 2020, Gran was fired from his post at Kentucky. On September 17, 2021, Gran was re–hired by Kentucky as a special assistant to the head coach.
