= Lamarcus Joyner =

American football player (born 1990)

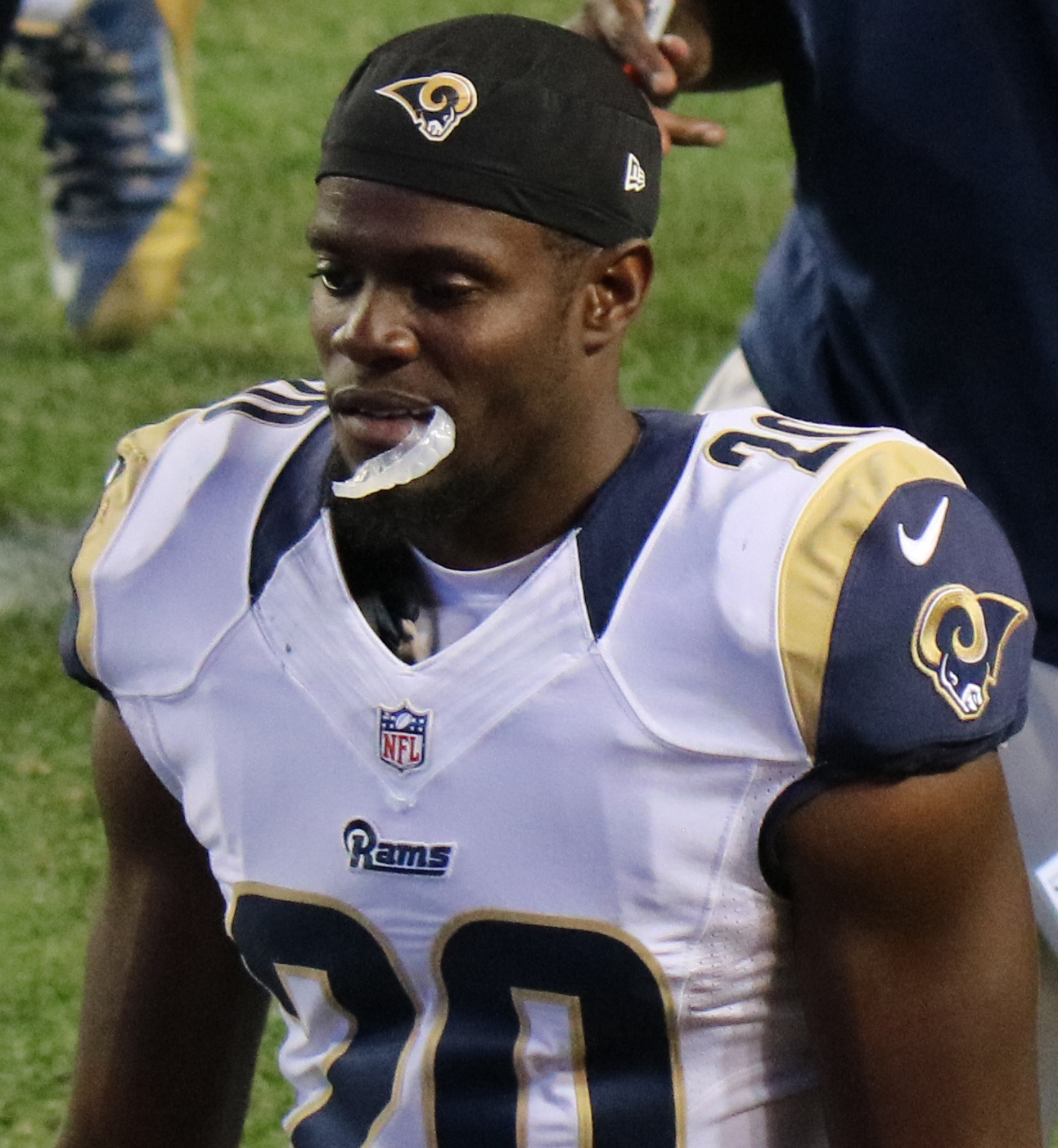
- Joyner with the Los Angeles Rams in 2016

No. 20, 29
- Position: Cornerback

Personal information
- Born: November 27, 1990 (age 35); Miami, Florida, U.S.
- Listed height: 5 ft 8 in (1.73 m)
- Listed weight: 185 lb (84 kg)

Career information
- High school: St. Thomas Aquinas (Fort Lauderdale, Florida)
- College: Florida State (2010–2013)
- NFL draft: 2014: 2nd round, 41st overall pick

Career history
- St. Louis / Los Angeles Rams (2014–2018); Oakland / Las Vegas Raiders (2019–2020); New York Jets (2021–2022)

Awards and highlights
- BCS national champion (2013); Unanimous All-American (2013); 2× First-team All-ACC (2012, 2013); Second-team All-ACC (2011)

Career NFL statistics
- Total tackles: 478
- Sacks: 5.0
- Forced fumbles: 2
- Fumble recoveries: 3
- Interceptions: 7
- Defensive touchdowns: 1
- Stats at Pro Football Reference

Lamarcus Joyner (born November 27, 1990) is an American former professional football player who was a cornerback of the National Football League (NFL). After being named 2009 Defensive High School Player of the Year by USA Today, he played college football for the Florida State Seminoles and was selected by the St. Louis Rams in the second round of the 2014 NFL draft.

== Early life ==
A native of Miami, Florida, Joyner originally attended Southwest Miami High School, where he played three seasons on the varsity football team at linebacker and defensive back as well as wide receiver and kick returner. As a sophomore, he had more than 100 tackles and also accounted for more than 1,000 yards on offense. In his junior year, he recorded 112 tackles, four sacks and an interception. He then decided to transfer to St. Thomas Aquinas High School in Fort Lauderdale, Florida, a private school and football powerhouse coached by George Smith. Featuring talented running backs Giovani Bernard and James White, St. Thomas Aquinas went undefeated through the season, extending a win-streak that began in 2007 to 37 wins, until losing 28–20 to Manatee High School in a Class 5A state semifinal at Hawkins Stadium in Bradenton, Florida. For the season, Joyner contributed as a shut-down cornerback, recording only 14 tackles (12 solo) as opponents stayed away from his side of the field. He also starred on special teams, as he averaged 39.6 yards per return and managed to return three kickoffs for scores. On offense, he recorded 1,090 all-purpose yards on just 79 touches, scoring four rushing and four receiving touchdowns. His impact on the defensive side, however, earned him the National Defensive Player of the Year award by USA Today.

In addition to football, Joyner was on the school's track & field team. He placed 3rd in the 100 meters at the 2010 BCAA Championships, with a career-best time of 10.83 seconds. He was also a long jumper and high jumper.

Despite lacking prototypical size, Joyner was regarded as a five-star recruit by Rivals.com, and ranked as the No. 1 cornerback prospect in his class, ahead of fellow five-star DeMarcus Milliner. With offers from virtually every school in the country, Joyner took official visits to only Ohio State, Notre Dame, and Florida State, before committing to the Seminoles in early December 2009. He was the highest-rated Florida State recruit of the season, along with Christian Jones. Joining Derrick Brooks (1990), David Warren (1996), and Antonio Cromartie (2002), Joyner became the fourth ever USA Today National Defensive Player of the Year to sign with Florida State. He capped off his prep career by playing in the Under Armour All-America Game.

== College career ==
As a true freshman, Joyner attended Florida State University, where he played in all 14 games and finished with 23 tackles, two pass break-ups, and one interception, mostly on special teams but also as a back-up safety. In the 47–17 loss to Oklahoma, he had five returns for 74 yards. In the ACC Championship Game against Virginia Tech, Joyner had four returns for 112 yards. During spring practice of his sophomore year, Joyner was moved into the starting line-up at safety, a position at which he started all 13 games of the season. He recorded 54 tackles adding two tackles for loss, one sack, and three pass break-ups on the year, which earned him All-ACC second-team honors. In the Champs Sports Bowl, Joyner helped the Seminoles to an 18–14 win over Notre Dame tallying seven tackles and snagging his team-high fourth interception. In his junior year, Joyner again started all 14 games at safety. In his final season at FSU, Joyner had 69 tackles with seven tackles for a loss, two interceptions, four passes broken up, three forced fumbles, and 5.5 sacks. He was a finalist for the Jim Thorpe Award as a senior.

== Professional career ==
External videos
- Joyner's NFL Combine Workout

Pre-draft measurables
Height	Weight	Arm length	Hand span	Wingspan	40-yard dash	10-yard split	20-yard split	20-yard shuttle	Three-cone drill	Vertical jump	Broad jump	Bench press	Wonderlic
5 ft 8 in (1.73 m)	184 lb (83 kg)	31 1/2 in (0.80 m)	9 1/2 in (0.24 m)	6 ft 3 1/2 in (1.92 m)	4.55 s	1.59 s	2.68 s	4.40 s	7.26 s	37.5 in (0.95 m)	10 ft 4 in (3.15 m)	14 reps	13
All values from NFL Combine

=== St. Louis / Los Angeles Rams ===
==== 2014 ====
The St. Louis Rams selected Joyner in the second round (41st overall) of the 2014 NFL draft. Joyner was the fifth safety selected in 2014. The Rams traded their second round (44th overall) and fifth round (153rd overall) to the Buffalo Bills in order to move up and draft Joyner. The Buffalo Bills used their acquired picks to draft Alabama's Cyrus Kouandjio and Baylor's Cyril Richardson. On June 16, 2014, the Rams signed Joyner to a four-year, $5.03 million contract that includes $3.07 million guaranteed and a signing bonus of $1.97 million.

External videos
- Rams select Joyner 41st overall
- Lamarcus Joyner: First Draft

Head coach Jeff Fisher named Joyner the starting nickelback and the third free safety on the Rams' depth chart to begin the regular season.

He made his professional regular season debut in the Rams' season-opener against the Minnesota Vikings and recorded three solo tackles during their 34–6 loss. He pushed Greg Jennings out of bounds after an 11-yard reception in the first quarter for his first career regular season tackle. On October 26, 2014, Joyner recorded a season-high ten combined tackles (nine solo) during a 34–7 loss at the Kansas City Chiefs in Week 8. On November 9, 2014, Joyner exited in the first quarter of the Rams' 31–14 loss at the Arizona Cardinals after sustaining a groin injury. His groin injury sidelined him for the next three games (Weeks 11–13) and he was replaced by cornerback E. J. Gaines during his absence. Joyner missed another two games (Weeks 14–15) as a healthy scratch after defensive coordinator Gregg Williams opted to retain Gaines at nickelback. In Week 17, Joyner earned his first career start, recorded four combined tackles, and made his first career sack on quarterback Russell Wilson in the Rams' 20–6 loss at the Seattle Seahawks. He finished his rookie season with 40 combined tackles (35 solo), two pass deflections, and a sack in ten games and one start.

==== 2015 ====
He entered training camp competing for the job as the first-team nickelback against E.J. Gaines. Joyner became the de facto nickelback after Gaines sustained a lisfranc injury that was expected to sideline him for the entire season.

He appeared in the Rams' season-opener against the Seahawks and recorded a season-high seven solo tackles and a sack on Russell Wilson in their 34–31 loss. On November 9, 2015, Joyner was involved in a controversial play after delivering a late hit on quarterback Teddy Bridgewater in the fourth quarter of the 21–18 overtime loss to the Vikings. During the play, Bridgewater was performing a baseball slide after running for a five-yard gain and was hit by Joyner and immediately knocked unconscious. The Rams were received a 15-yard penalty for unnecessary roughness and Joyner would subsequently be fined $23,152 by the NFL. On December 6, 2015, Joyner tied his season-high of seven combined tackles and two pass deflections during a 27–3 loss against the Cardinals. He finished the 2015 season with 72 combined tackles (54 solo), six pass deflections, and two sacks in 16 games and six starts.

==== 2016 ====
During the offseason, the Rams officially relocated to Los Angeles, California. Throughout training camp, Joyner competed for the job as a starting cornerback against E.J. Gaines, Coty Sensabaugh, and Marcus Roberson. Head coach Jeff Fisher named Joyner the fourth cornerback on the Rams' depth chart to begin the regular season, behind Trumaine Johnson, E. J. Gaines, and Coty Sensabaugh. On October 16, 2016, Joyner recorded a season-high ten combined tackles (eight solo) and deflected a pass during a 31–28 loss at the Detroit Lions. In Week 4, he made four solo tackles, deflected a pass, and sacked quarterback Ryan Tannehill in the Rams' 14–10 loss to the Miami Dolphins. On December 12, 2016, it was reported that Rams' general manager Les Snead fired head coach Jeff Fisher after the Rams fell to a 4–9 record. Special teams coordinator John Fassel was named the interim head coach for the last three games of the regular season. He finished the 2016 season with 66 combined tackles (50 solo), five pass deflections, and a sack in 14 games and eight starts.

==== 2017 ====
During organized team activities, defensive coordinator Wade Phillips decided to have Joyner work out at free safety. On April 17, 2017, it was reported that Joyner would remain at free safety heading into training camp. He competed for the starting free safety job against Cody Davis and John Johnson. Head coach Sean McVay officially named Joyner the starting free safety, alongside strong safety Maurice Alexander, to begin the regular season.

He started the Los Angeles Rams' season-opener against the Indianapolis Colts and recorded four solo tackles, two pass deflections, and returned an interception by Scott Tolzien for a 29-yard touchdown in the fourth quarter of their 46–9 victory. It marked Joyner's first career touchdown in his four-year career. The following week, Joyner recorded a season-high nine combined tackles during a 27–20 loss to the Washington Redskins. He was sidelined for three consecutive games (Weeks 4–6) after sustaining a hamstring injury. On December 3, 2017, he made a season-high three pass deflections, five combined tackles, and returned an interception by Carson Palmer in the Rams' 32–16 victory at the Cardinals in Week 13. Joyner was inactive for the Rams' Week 17 loss to the San Francisco 49ers, due to the decision by head coach Sean McVay to rest him for the playoffs. He finished his first season as the starting free safety with 49 combined tackles (39 solo), nine pass deflections, three interceptions, a forced fumble, and a touchdown in 12 games and 12 starts. Pro Football Focus gave Joyner an overall grade of 90.3, ranking him third among all qualified safeties in 2017.

The Rams finished first in the NFC West with an 11–5 record in their first season under head coach Sean McVay. On January 6, 2018, Joyner started in his first career playoff game and recorded 11 combined tackles (ten solo) in the Rams' 26–13 loss to the Atlanta Falcons in the NFC Wildcard Game.

==== 2018 ====
On March 6, 2018, the Rams placed their franchise tag tender on Joyner. On April 16, Joyner signed his one-year, $11.28 million franchise tag to remain with the Rams for the 2018 season. In Week 11 against the Kansas City Chiefs, Joyner made his first interception of the season off quarterback Patrick Mahomes II; his interception sealed a 54–51 Rams win. Joyner finished the season with 78 tackles and one interception. He helped the Rams reach Super Bowl LIII after they defeated the Dallas Cowboys and New Orleans Saints in the playoffs. The Rams would eventually fall 13–3 to the New England Patriots in the Super Bowl.

=== Oakland / Las Vegas Raiders ===
==== 2019 ====
On March 14, 2019, Joyner signed a four-year, $42 million contract with the Oakland Raiders. Joyner made his debut with the Raiders in week 1 against the Denver Broncos. In the game, Joyner made six tackles in the 24–16 win.

==== 2020 ====
Joyner was placed on the reserve/COVID-19 list by the team on November 17, 2020, and activated three days later. He was placed back on the COVID-19 list on November 22. and activated again on December 2. Joyner was released by the Raiders after the season on March 9, 2021.

=== New York Jets ===
Joyner signed a one-year contract with the New York Jets on March 22, 2021. He was placed on injured reserve on September 14, after suffering an elbow injury in Week 1 against the Carolina Panthers.

On March 15, 2022, Joyner signed a one-year contract extension with the Jets. He started 14 games for the team, recording three interceptions, one fumble recovery, and 57 total tackles. On January 7, 2023, Joyner was placed on season–ending injured reserve.

== NFL career statistics ==
Legend
**Bold**	Career high

Year	Team	Games		Tackles				Fumbles				Interceptions					
Year	Team	GP	GS	Comb	Solo	Ast	Sack	FF	FR	Yds	TD	PD	Int	Yds	Avg	Lng	TD
2014	STL	10	1	40	35	5	1.0	—	—	—	—	2	—	—	—	—	—
2015	STL	16	6	72	54	18	**2.0**	—	**1**	—	—	6	—	—	—	—	—
2016	LAR	14	8	66	50	16	1.0	**1**	—	—	—	5	—	—	—	—	—
2017	LAR	12	12	49	39	10	0.0	**1**	—	—	—	**9**	**3**	**104**	**34.7**	**46**	**1**
2018	LAR	15	15	**78**	**58**	20	1.0	—	**1**	—	—	3	1	5	5.0	5	0
2019	OAK	14	10	49	41	8	0.0	—	—	—	—	3	—	—	—	—	—
2020	LV	14	6	66	53	13	0.0	—	—	—	—	5	—	—	—	—	—
2021	NYJ	1	1	1	1	0	0.0	—	—	—	—	—	—	—	—	—	—
2022	NYJ	14	14	57	30	**27**	0.0	—	**1**	**1**	—	6	**3**	31	10.3	27	0
Career		110	73	478	361	117	5.0	2	3	1	0	39	7	140	20.0	46	1
