= 2011 Champs Sports Bowl =

American college football game

Florida State Seminoles	Notre Dame Fighting Irish
(8–4)	(8–4)
ACC	Independent
18	14
Head coach: Jimbo Fisher	Head coach: Brian Kelly
AP / Coaches / BCS; 25 / 25 / NR
	1	2	3	4	Total
Florida State	0	0	3	15	18
Notre Dame	7	0	7	0	14
- Date: December 29, 2011
- Season: 2011
- Stadium: Florida Citrus Bowl
- Location: Orlando, Florida
- MVP: WR Rashad Greene
- Favorite: Florida State by 3
- Referee: Reggie Smith (Big 12)
- Attendance: 68,305
- Payout: US$2.275 million per team

United States TV coverage
- Network: ESPN/ESPN 3D
- Announcers: Joe Tessitore (Play-by-Play); Rod Gilmore (Analyst); Holly Rowe (Sidelines)
- Nielsen ratings: 3.28

The 2011 Champs Sports Bowl, the 22nd edition of the game, was a post-season American college football bowl game, held on December 29, 2011, at the Citrus Bowl in Orlando, Florida as part of the 2011–12 NCAA bowl season.

The game, which was telecast at 5:30 p.m. ET on ESPN and ESPN 3D, featured a team from the Atlantic Coast Conference versus a team from the Big East Conference.

Invitations were accepted by Florida State and Notre Dame to play in the contest on December 4. It was FSU's second Champs Bowl, and Notre Dame's first. Notre Dame was invited through an option in the Big East tie-in. The game sold out on December 7, marking the Champs Sports Bowl's first ever sellout.

== Teams ==
The two teams met for the seventh time since 1981. The Seminoles lead the all-time series 5–2, including a 2–0 bowl record against the Fighting Irish. The other bowl meeting was the Orange Bowl following the 1995 season. The teams also had a 1994 regular season meeting in Orlando, a year after the teams met in South Bend ranked #1 and #2 in the nation. Beginning in 2014, Notre Dame will play Florida State at least once every three years as part of the Irish's agreement to play five ACC football schools each year, as in 2013, Notre Dame became a non-football member of the ACC, maintaining its football independence.

=== Florida State ===
Florida State won six of its last seven games. The Seminoles were rated as the No. 6 defense in the nation with a No. 2 rushing defense (81.83 yards per game). The team topped the nation in opponent yards per rush (2.32 yards per carry), and limited opponents to 15.2 points per game, 4th best in the country.

=== Notre Dame ===
December 25, 2011 Notre Dame had won four of its last five games, but lost 28–14 to then No. 4 Stanford to close the regular season. The team featured one the nation's best receiving combos in wide receiver Michael Floyd, who had 7.92 receptions per game for 92.17 yards per game, and tight end Tyler Eifert, who had 57 receptions for 713 receiving yards.

== Scoring Summary ==
Source.

Scoring Play	Score
1st Quarter
ND – Zeke Motta 29 Yd Fumble Return (David Ruffer Kick), 9:04	ND 7–0
2nd Quarter
3rd Quarter
ND – Michael Floyd 5 Yd Pass from Tommy Rees (David Ruffer Kick), 11:24	ND 14–0
FSU – Dustin Hopkins 42 Yd Field Goal, 9:03	ND 14–3
4th Quarter
FSU – Bert Reed 18 Yd Pass From EJ Manuel (Two-Point Conversion Failed), 14:54	ND 14–9
FSU – Rashad Greene 15 Yd Pass From E.J. Manuel (Two-Point Conversion Failed), 13:18	FSU 15–14
FSU – Dustin Hopkins 29 Yd Field Goal, 8:05	FSU 18–14

=== Statistics ===
Statistics	FSU	ND
First downs	13	19
Rushes-yards (net)	29–41	35–93
Passing yards (net)	249	187
Passes, Att-Comp-Int	31–20–0	35–19–3
Total yards	290	280
Time of Possession	29:51	30:09
