= 2010 Gator Bowl =

2010 Konica Minolta Gator Bowl
- 65th Gator Bowl
West Virginia Mountaineers	Florida State Seminoles
(9–3)	(6–6)
Big East	ACC
21	33
Head coach: Bill Stewart	Head coach: Bobby Bowden
AP / Coaches / BCS; 18 / 17 / 16
	1	2	3	4	Total
West Virginia	14	0	0	7	21
Florida State	3	10	10	10	33
- Date: January 1, 2010
- Season: 2009
- Stadium: Jacksonville Municipal Stadium
- Location: Jacksonville, Florida
- MVP: EJ Manuel (QB, Florida State) & Noel Devine (HB, West Virginia)
- Referee: Dave Witvoet (Big Ten)
- Attendance: 84,129
- Payout: US$2.5 million

United States TV coverage
- Network: CBS
- Announcers: Verne Lundquist, Gary Danielson, and Tracy Wolfson
- Nielsen ratings: 4.0

The 2010 Gator Bowl game was a post-season college football bowl game between the West Virginia University Mountaineers representing the Big East, and the Florida State University Seminoles from the ACC, and was played on Friday, January 1, 2010, at Jacksonville Municipal Stadium in Jacksonville, Florida. It was the 65th edition of the bowl game. This edition's full name was the Konica Minolta Gator Bowl after its sponsor, Konica Minolta.

The game was the last to be coached by legendary Florida State head coach Bobby Bowden prior to his retirement. Bowden had publicly stated that he would like to coach the game in the state of Florida — which created what amounts to a Florida State home game. Prior to coaching at FSU, Bowden was the head coach at West Virginia. Therefore, many felt that the bowl game would serve as a fitting end to his career. 42 of Bowden's 389 career wins came at West Virginia between 1970 and 1975. He was West Virginia's offensive coordinator for four seasons before becoming the head coach. Gator Bowl officials confirmed to The News & Observer of Raleigh, North Carolina that if they had the chance, they would select the Seminoles.

The main obstacle that surrounded the proposition was that Florida State finished 4–4 in ACC play. Under normal conditions, had Georgia Tech lost the ACC Championship Game to Clemson and been passed over for the Chick-fil-A Bowl then it would have been difficult for the Gator Bowl not to choose Georgia Tech because of the ACC's rule that states, "a team cannot be passed for consideration by an ACC bowl partner for a team more than one loss behind in the conference standings." In this case, the Gator Bowl would have theoretically not been able to pass over Georgia Tech, Clemson and Virginia Tech in favor of Florida State. However, Gator Bowl officials stated that under the same contract the bowl only has to invite the ACC title game loser once in four years, which it did with Georgia Tech in 2007.

Both West Virginia and Florida State had played in the Gator Bowl six times prior to this game. The two teams met in the Gator Bowl on two prior occasions, first in 1982 with FSU winning 31-12 and then again in 2005 with the Seminoles winning 30–18. The 1982 game was the start of Florida State's current 28-year streak of playing in bowl games.

== Pregame events ==
Activity	Sponsor	When
Golf tournaments	Gator Bowl Association	September/December
Red Wagon Parade	Gator Bowl Association	September
Little Gator Bowl Pop Warner Championships	Gator Bowl Association	November
Players Welcome at Dave and Busters	CSX Transportation	Gator Bowl week Day 1
Adventure Landing Player's Outing	Gator Bowl Association	Gator Bowl week Day 2/3
Fellowship of Christian Athletes Breakfast	First Baptist Church	Gator Bowl week Day 4
Day at the Jacksonville Zoo	Outback Steakhouse	Gator Bowl week Day 5
Coaches Luncheon/Hall of Fame Induction	Gate Petroleum	Gator Bowl week Day 6
5K Run	VyStar Credit Union	Gator Bowl week day 6
Gator Bowl Parade	Winn Dixie	Gator Bowl week day 6
Pep Rally	Jacksonville Landing	Gator Bowl week day 6
St. Johns River Midnight Fireworks	City of Jacksonville	Gator Bowl week day 6
Touchdown party at Fairgrounds	Florida Times-Union	Gator Bowl week day 7
Stadium Tailgate party	Budweiser	Gator Bowl week day 7
Gator Bowl Football Game	Konica Minolta	Gator Bowl week day 7

== Game summary ==
Seminoles tailback Jermaine Thomas ran for two touchdowns, Florida State scored 20 straight points to take control and the Seminoles knocked off No. 18 West Virginia 33–21 in the final game of Bobby Bowden's storied 44-year career as a head coach. Bowden finished with a 389-129-4 record, and most importantly to him, a 33rd consecutive winning season. West Virginia took the opening kickoff and scored without much resistance, a 72-yard, eight-play drive capped by a 32-yard touchdown rush by starting quarterback Jarrett Brown, who was injured in the second quarter. The Mountaineers went up 14–3 on their second possession, after Noel Devine broke off a 70-yard run to get inside the Florida State 5, then wound up scoring from 1 yard out. After Jamie Robinson intercepted Brown early in the second quarter, Florida State got back into it on Thomas' first touchdown of the day, a 12-yard rush. Dustin Hopkins, who missed a 37-yard try earlier in the period, connected on a 42-yard field goal with 8 seconds left in the half, getting the Seminoles within 14–13 at the break.

After the second-half kickoff was taken 69 yards to the West Virginia 9, FSU kicked another field goal. Then a Jarmon Fortson ridiculous, leaping, one-handed, 29-yard catch, Thomas scored from 19 yards out later in the third to give Florida State a 23–14 lead into entering the last 15 minutes of Bowden's career. Ryan Clarke plunged in from 5 yards away for West Virginia on the first play of the fourth quarter, but the Seminoles answered with a methodical drive to restore the nine-point lead, quarterback E.J. Manuel's 2-yard touchdown burst putting Florida State up 30–21.

West Virginia's school-record four-game bowl winning streak came to an end with the loss. Florida State won five of its final seven games of the season after a three-game losing streak. In his 33rd and presumably final bowl game, Bobby Bowden won again, bringing his career bowl record to 22-10-1. His .682 bowl winning percentage is the best in NCAA history among coaches to coach in at least 20 bowl games.

=== Scoring summary ===
Scoring Play	Score
1st Quarter
WVU — Jarrett Brown 31-yard rush (Tyler Bitancurt kick), 11:45	WVU 7-0
FSU — Dustin Hopkins 26 Yd FG, 7:06	WVU 7-3
WVU — Noel Devine 1-yard rush (Tyler Bitancurt kick), 5:13	WVU 14-3
2nd Quarter
FSU — Jermaine Thomas 12 Yd Run (Dustin Hopkins Kick), 10:57	WVU 14-10
FSU — Dustin Hopkins 42 Yd FG, 00:08	WVU 14-13
3rd Quarter
FSU — Dustin Hopkins 22 Yd FG, 12:15	FSU 16-14
FSU — Jermaine Thomas 19 Yd Run (Dustin Hopkins Kick), 3:50	FSU 23-14
4th Quarter
WVU — Ryan Clarke 5 Yd Run (Tyler Bitancurt Kick), 14:56	FSU 23-21
FSU — E.J. Manuel 2 Yd Run (Dustin Hopkins Kick), 8:54	FSU 30-21
FSU — Dustin Hopkins 37 Yd FG, 2:02	FSU 33-21
