= Dax Dellenbach =

American football player (born 1990)

Profile
- Position: Long snapper

Personal information
- Born: April 13, 1990 (age 36); Weston, Florida
- Listed height: 6 ft 2 in (1.88 m)
- Listed weight: 245 lb (111 kg)

Career information
- College: Florida State
- NFL draft: 2013: undrafted

Career history
- Tampa Bay Buccaneers (2017)*
- * Offseason or practice squad member only

Dax Dellenbach (born April 13, 1990) is an American football long snapper for the Tampa Bay Buccaneers of the National Football League (NFL). He played college football at Florida State.

== Professional career ==
On February 7, 2017, Dellenbach signed a reserve/future contract with the Tampa Bay Buccaneers.

== Personal life ==
He is the son of former NFL player and Super Bowl champion Jeff Dellenbach. Dax is one of four children of Jeff Dellenbach and Mary. Dax currently lives in Weston with his long-time girlfriend, Alyssa.
