= Ruben Carter (American football) =

American gridiron football player (born 1992)

Profile
- Position: Center

Personal information
- Born: December 1, 1992 (age 33); Miami, Florida, U.S.
- Listed height: 6 ft 4 in (1.93 m)
- Listed weight: 312 lb (142 kg)

Career information
- High school: Miami Jackson
- College: Florida State, Toledo
- NFL draft: 2016: undrafted

Career history
- Miami Dolphins (2016)*; Calgary Stampeders (2017)*; Dallas Cowboys (2017)*; Pittsburgh Steelers (2017)*; Baltimore Brigade (2018)*; Montreal Alouettes (2018); Orlando Apollos (2019)*; Massachusetts Pirates (2019–?)
- * Offseason or practice squad member only

Awards and highlights
- BCS national champion (2013)

Ruben Christopher Carter (born December 1, 1992) is an American former professional football center. He played college football for the Florida State Seminoles and Toledo. He signed with the Miami Dolphins as an undrafted free agent in 2016.

== Professional career ==
=== Miami Dolphins ===
On April 30, 2016, Carter signed with the Miami Dolphins as an undrafted free agent. Carter was waived by the Dolphins on August 27, 2016.

=== Calgary Stampeders ===
On October 7, 2016, Carter signed with the Calgary Stampeders of the Canadian Football League as a member of the practice roster.

=== Dallas Cowboys ===
On May 24, 2017, Carter signed with the Dallas Cowboys. He was waived on August 15, 2017.

=== Pittsburgh Steelers ===
On August 25, 2017, Carter signed with the Pittsburgh Steelers. He was waived on September 2, 2017.

=== Baltimore Brigade ===
On March 20, 2018, Carter was assigned to the Baltimore Brigade. On March 30, 2018, he was placed on reassignment.

=== Orlando Apollos ===
Carter signed with the Orlando Apollos of the Alliance of American Football for the 2019 season.
