= Nick Moody =

American football player (born 1990)

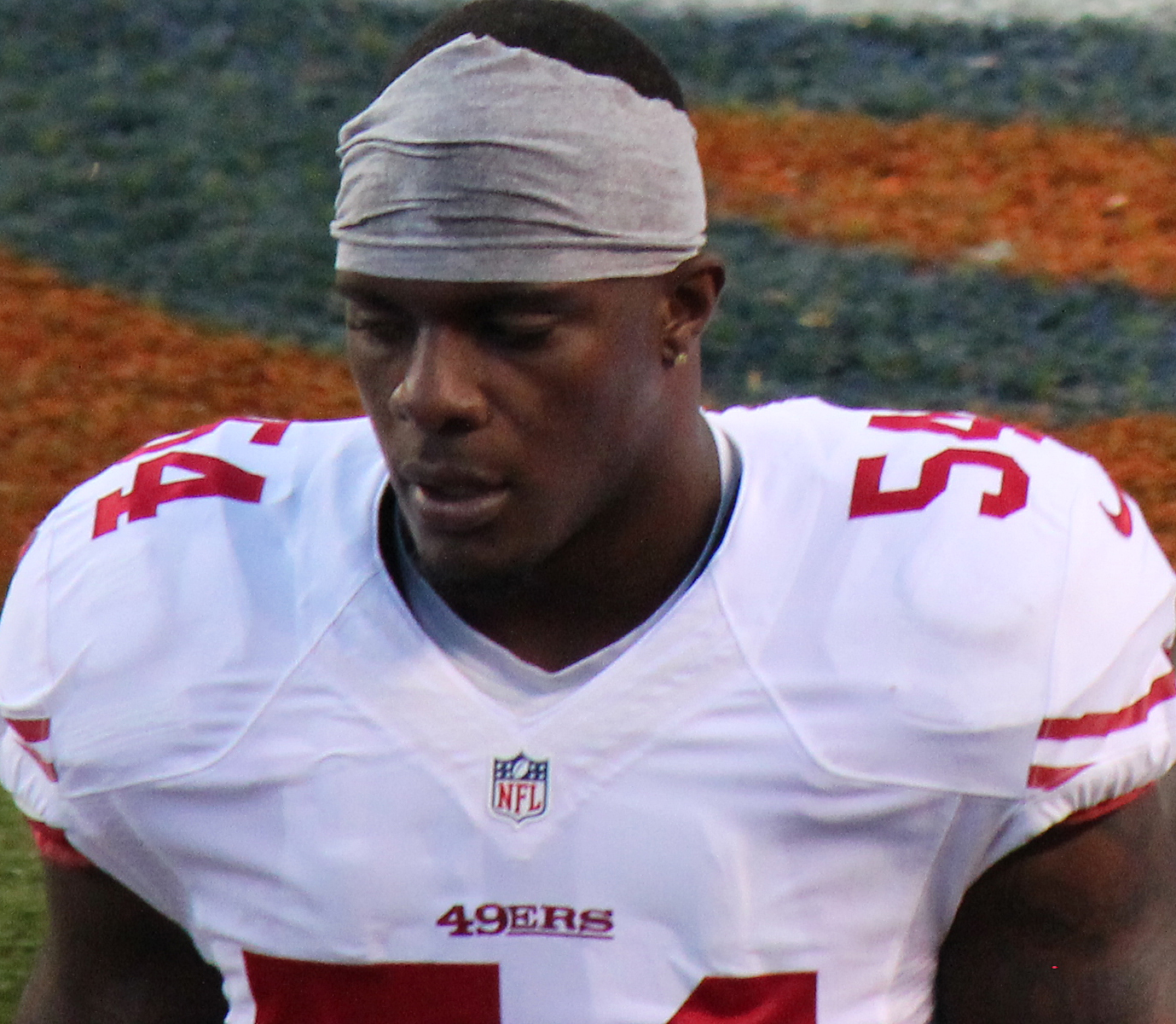
- Moody with the San Francisco 49ers in 2014

No. 54, 53, 55
- Position: Inside linebacker

Personal information
- Born: January 29, 1990 (age 36); Wyncote, Pennsylvania, U.S.
- Listed height: 6 ft 1 in (1.85 m)
- Listed weight: 245 lb (111 kg)

Career information
- High school: Roman Catholic (Philadelphia, Pennsylvania)
- College: Florida State (2008–2012)
- NFL draft: 2013: 6th round, 180th overall pick

Career history
- San Francisco 49ers (2013–2014); Seattle Seahawks (2015); Washington Redskins (2016)

Career NFL statistics
- Total tackles: 26
- Stats at Pro Football Reference

Nick Moody (born January 29, 1990) is an American former professional football player who was an inside linebacker in the National Football League (NFL). He was selected by the San Francisco 49ers in the sixth round of the 2013 NFL draft. He played college football for the Florida State Seminoles and played safety and linebacker. He was also a member of the Pi Kappa Alpha fraternity.

== Professional career ==
=== San Francisco 49ers ===
On April 27, 2013, Moody was selected with the 12th pick on the sixth round (180th overall) by the San Francisco 49ers. On May 10 Moody signed a four-year contract with the team. After breaking his hand in a week 1 victory over the Green Bay Packers, Moody was placed on injured reserve/recall on September 11. On November 12, 2013, the 49ers activated Moody.

On September 5, 2015, Moody was waived by the 49ers.

=== Seattle Seahawks ===
Moody signed to the practice squad of the Seattle Seahawks on September 12, 2015. On October 14, he was promoted to the Seahawks' active roster. On November 24, he was placed on injured reserve.

=== Washington Redskins ===
On December 13, 2016, Moody was signed by the Washington Redskins. He was waived on December 23.
