= Josue Matías =

American gridiron football player (born 1993)

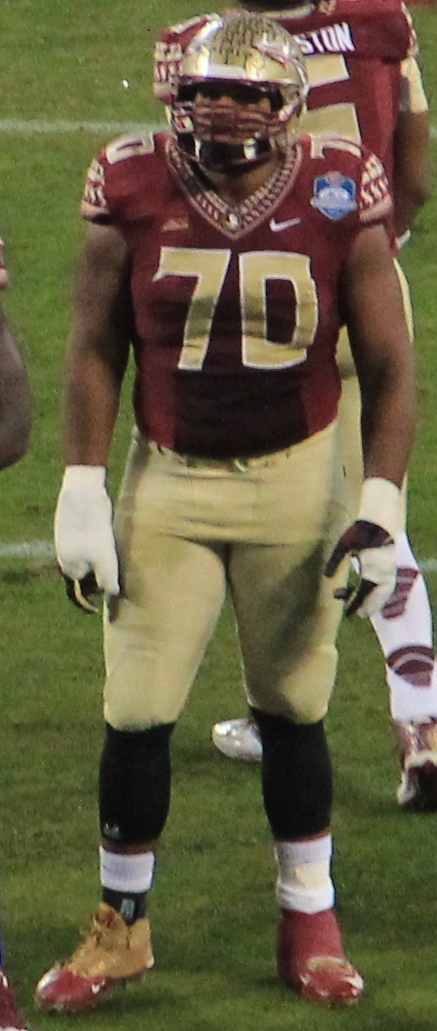
- Matías with the Florida State Seminoles

No. 67, 66
- Position: Guard

Personal information
- Born: January 6, 1993 (age 33); Dominican Republic
- Listed height: 6 ft 5 in (1.96 m)
- Listed weight: 309 lb (140 kg)

Career information
- High school: Union City (NJ)
- College: Florida State (2011-2014)
- NFL draft: 2015: undrafted

Career history
- Tennessee Titans (2015–2016); Ottawa Redblacks (2018)

Awards and highlights
- BCS national champion (2013); Second-team All-ACC (2014)
- Stats at Pro Football Reference
- Stats at CFL.ca

Josue Matías (born January 6, 1993) is a former gridiron football guard who last played for the Ottawa Redblacks. He played college football at Florida State. Upon signing with the Tennessee Titans in 2015, he became the first Dominican-born player in the NFL.

== Early life ==
Matías was born in the Dominican Republic and moved to Union City, New Jersey with his family when he was six. He attended Union City High School. Matías was a four-star recruit by Rivals.com. He originally committed to Rutgers University to play college football but changed to Florida State University.

== College career ==
After spending his true freshman season in 2011 as a backup, Matías started all 13 games as a sophomore in 2012. As a junior in 2013, he started all 14 games, including the 2014 BCS National Championship Game. He returned as a starter his senior season in 2014.

== Professional career ==
=== Tennessee Titans ===
Matias signed with the Tennessee Titans as an undrafted free agent following the 2015 NFL draft. He was waived on September 5, 2015, and was signed to the practice squad the next day, where he spent his entire rookie season.

On August 17, 2016, Matias was waived/injured by the Titans after suffering a torn patellar tendon and was placed on injured reserve.

On September 2, 2017, Matias was waived by the Titans.

=== Ottawa Redblacks ===
Matias joined the Ottawa Redblacks in June 2018. He started his first game since the 2015 Rose Bowl in October 2018.

Matias announced his retirement from football on March 30, 2019.
