= Zebrie Sanders =

American football player (born 1989)

No. 66
- Position: Offensive tackle

Personal information
- Born: December 4, 1989 (age 36); Columbia, South Carolina, U.S.
- Listed height: 6 ft 7 in (2.01 m)
- Listed weight: 335 lb (152 kg)

Career information
- High school: Northmont (Clayton, Ohio)
- College: Florida State
- NFL draft: 2012: 5th round, 144th overall pick

Career history
- Buffalo Bills (2012); Winnipeg Blue Bombers (2015)*; Calgary Stampeders (2015)
- * Offseason or practice squad member only

Awards and highlights
- First-team All-ACC (2011)
- Stats at Pro Football Reference

Zebrie Sanders (born December 4, 1989) is an American former professional football offensive tackle. He played college football for the Florida State Seminoles. He was selected by the Buffalo Bills in the fifth round of the 2012 NFL draft. He was considered one of the best offensive tackle prospects for the 2012 NFL draft.

== College career ==
Sanders was a starter for the Seminoles since beginning in his freshman year and started 37 games prior to his senior year.

== Professional career ==
Sanders was selected by the Buffalo Bills in the fifth round (144th overall) in the 2012 NFL draft. He spent his entire rookie season on IR due to an hip injury. He was released by the Bills on August 31, 2013.
