= Jimbo Fisher =

American football coach (born 1965)

- Fisher in 2014

Biographical details
- Born: October 9, 1965 (age 61); Clarksburg, West Virginia, U.S.
- Education: Samford University (1989)

Playing career
- 1985–1986: Salem
- 1987: Samford
- 1988: Chicago Bruisers
- Position: Quarterback

Coaching career (HC unless noted)
- 1988–1990: Samford (GA/QB)
- 1991–1992: Samford (OC/QB)
- 1993–1998: Auburn (QB)
- 1999: Cincinnati (OC/QB)
- 2000–2006: LSU (OC/QB)
- 2007–2009: Florida State (OC/QB)
- 2010–2017: Florida State
- 2018–2023: Texas A&M

Head coaching record
- Overall: 128–48
- Bowls: 8–2
- Tournaments: 0–1 (CFP)

Accomplishments and honors

Championships
- 1 National (2013); 3 ACC (2012–2014); 4 ACC Atlantic Division (2010, 2012–2014)

Awards
- Division III National Player of the Year (1987); AFCA Regional Coach of the Year (2013); Rawlings Football College Coach of the Year (2013)

John James "Jimbo" Fisher Jr. (born October 9, 1965) is an American college football coach. He was the head coach at Texas A&M from 2018 until 2023. Prior to that, he was the head coach at Florida State, leading the Seminoles to a BCS National Championship in 2013.

== Life and career ==
=== Early life and playing career ===
Born in Clarksburg, West Virginia, Fisher attended Liberty High School. He initially attended Clemson University to play baseball before going to Salem College (now Salem University) in Salem, West Virginia, where he played quarterback under head coach Terry Bowden from 1985 to 1986. When Bowden left for Samford University in Homewood, Alabama, Fisher transferred with him to play his final season for the Bulldogs. Fisher still holds multiple school records at Samford. As a senior at Samford University, Fisher was the 1987 NCAA Division III National Player of the Year.

Fisher played a season in the Arena Football League in 1988 for the Chicago Bruisers.

=== Assistant coaching career ===
His coaching career began when he rejoined his former coach Terry Bowden at Samford as a graduate assistant coach working with quarterbacks from 1988–1990. He was subsequently hired as the full-time offensive coordinator and quarterbacks coach. After two seasons, Fisher moved with Bowden to Auburn University where he coached quarterbacks. At Auburn, Fisher coached several successful quarterbacks including Patrick Nix. He continued at Auburn until Tommy Tuberville took over as head coach following Terry Bowden's 1998 mid-season resignation.

Fisher coached quarterbacks and was the offensive coordinator for one season at Cincinnati before joining Nick Saban's staff at LSU in 2000. When Saban left for the NFL's Miami Dolphins, Fisher remained at LSU to continue his role with Les Miles.

Fisher interviewed for the head coaching position at the University of Alabama at Birmingham after the 2006 season but the University of Alabama System Board of Trustees vetoed the contract offer, sparking controversy since the same board oversees the flagship campus in Tuscaloosa. He turned down an invitation from Nick Saban to join the coaching staff at the University of Alabama to become offensive coordinator and quarterbacks coach at Florida State University, where he replaced Jeff Bowden, son of then-Seminoles coach Bobby Bowden.

His contract guaranteed a salary of $215,000 with incentives increasing the total package into the $400,000's. After his first season as offensive coordinator at Florida State, Fisher was named "head coach in waiting", making him the eventual successor for Bobby Bowden. The new contract paid Fisher around $600,000 per year with a $2.5 million buyout clause. The university promised to pay $5 million to Fisher if he was not made head coach by January 2011.

On December 1, 2009, Bowden announced that he would retire from coaching after the Seminoles' Gator Bowl matchup on New Year's Day 2010 against West Virginia. Fisher began selecting his staff and recruiting players while preparing the team for its bowl game for the last time as a Bowden assistant. The Seminoles sent Bowden out with a 33–21 victory on January 1. Fisher held his first staff meeting the following afternoon. On January 5, he became the ninth head football coach in Florida State history.

=== Head coach at Florida State ===
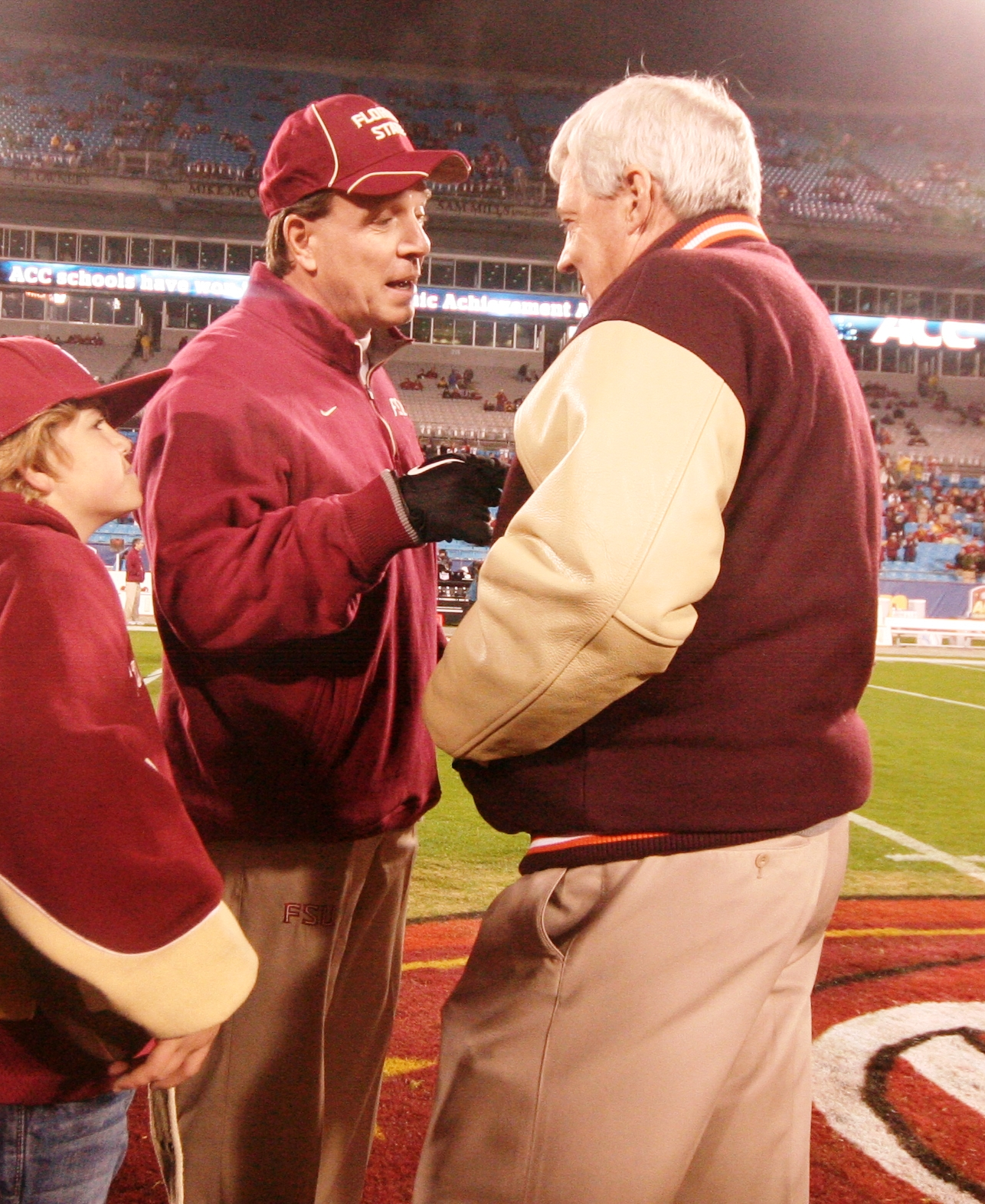
Jimbo Fisher (left) and Frank Beamer (right) at the 2010 ACC Championship Game

Jimbo Fisher's official introduction as head coach took place at a Florida State University press conference on January 7, 2010. "Empowered, confident athletes are winners," he said. "My goal is to get the structure, the staff and the support resources in place to facilitate a winning plan and get players into the structure and start effecting change. Now." Fisher then announced his 2010 coaching staff.

In his first season, Fisher led the Seminoles to their first 10-win season since 2003, and only their second of the new millennium. They also swept in-state rivals Miami and Florida for the first time since 1999, and defeated South Carolina in the Chick-fil-A Bowl. He followed that up with a 9–4 season in 2011, which included another sweep of Miami and Florida and a win over Notre Dame in the Champs Sports Bowl.

Fisher and the Seminoles experienced further success in 2012. The Seminoles won their first conference title in seven years. The program appeared in a major bowl for the first time in seven years, defeating Northern Illinois in the Orange Bowl.

One year later, the Seminoles, led by quarterback and Heisman Trophy winner Jameis Winston, rolled through the season undefeated and defeated Auburn in the 2014 BCS National Championship Game to win the school's third national championship and first since 1999.

Although it was not apparent at the time, Fisher's tenure at Florida State crested with the 2013 national championship season. A year later, the Seminoles stormed through the regular season undefeated for the second year in a row. However, they suffered a humiliating 59–20 loss to Oregon in the Rose Bowl, the most points Florida State had ever surrendered in a bowl game. It also ended a 29-game winning streak dating to the 2012 season. The next two years the team had identical 10–3 records with a combined 11–5 record in ACC play. One of those conference losses was a 63–20 rout at the hands of Louisville in 2016, at the time the most points the Seminoles had given up in school history. By comparison, the Seminoles had only lost six conference games in Fisher's first five years.

The beginning of the end for Fisher's tenure came in the 2017 season opener. In the second half of a season-opening 24–7 loss to Alabama, quarterback Deondre Francois tore the patellar tendon in his left knee. Francois' backup, James Blackman, was raw and untested, exposing FSU's several years of recruiting misses at quarterback since Winston's signing. A close loss to NC State a week later knocked them out of the polls for the first time since the middle of the 2011 season. They went on to finish with their first on-field losing record in ACC play since joining the league. They were only able to continue the longest active bowl streak in FBS by defeating Louisiana-Monroe team in a game that had been rescheduled from September due to Hurricane Irma.

A 2019 article in Bleacher Report detailed a number of problems with the culture of the FSU program under Fisher. According to former assistants, the players seemed to lose their drive after the 2013 national championship season. Additionally, Bleacher Report revealed that Florida State had the worst Academic Progress Rate score of any Power Five program, and was actually on the verge of an automatic postseason ban. Reportedly, Fisher had given his assistants a mandate to "keep players eligible" above all else; athletic director Dave Coburn conceded as much. Fisher's successor, Willie Taggart, was stunned at the apparent laissez-faire attitude toward academics when he arrived, and instituted immediate changes. Several former assistants from Fisher's tenure believed the casual attitude toward academics were part of a larger erosion of discipline that gradually led to a sense of entitlement.

In eight years at Florida State, Fisher accumulated an 83–23 record, a BCS national championship, three ACC conference championships, four Atlantic Division titles (three outright, one shared), four AP Poll top 10 finishes, and four bowl game victories. His .783 winning percentage is the highest in FSU history.

=== Head coach at Texas A&M ===
On December 1, 2017, Fisher resigned as the head coach at Florida State University to accept the same job at Texas A&M University. Fisher signed a 10-year, $75 million contract with the Aggies. During an August 2018 ESPN interview, when asked why he chose to take the A&M job, Fisher listed several reasons, including his connection with A&M athletic director Scott Woodward as well as the A&M culture, academics, and facilities.

In his first season at A&M, Fisher coached the Aggies to a 9–4 record and a second-place finish in the SEC West, which was the program's best conference finish since joining the conference in 2012. The season included a 74–72 seven-overtime win over LSU, which was the program's first victory over the Tigers since 1995. The game saw the most combined points scored (146) in a Division I Football Bowl Subdivision (FBS) football game. The Aggies defeated the NC State Wolfpack 52–13 in the 2018 Gator Bowl.

Fisher's 2019 Aggies team entered the season ranked 12th, but suffered losses to then-ranked top-10 teams including Clemson, Alabama, Auburn, Georgia, and LSU. Texas A&M became the first team to face three teams ranked #1 at the time of the matchup. The Aggies received an invitation to the 2019 Texas Bowl, where they defeated Oklahoma State 24–21.

During the COVID-19-shortened conference-only 2020 season, Fisher led the Aggies to a 9–1 record, which earned the team the No. 4 ranking in the AP Poll, the highest postseason ranking for the Aggies since the 1939 season. Texas A&M finished fifth in the College Football Playoff final poll, becoming the first team out of the field. The team qualified for the Orange Bowl, where they defeated North Carolina 41–27.

Prior to the 2021 season, the Texas A&M Board of Regents voted to extend Fisher's contract through the 2031 season. Beginning January 1, 2022, Fisher would be paid $9 million annually. If he was to be fired without cause before December 1, 2021, he would have been owed $95.6 million – the largest buyout clause in college football history. As was part of the original contract signed in 2018, if Jimbo chooses to leave Texas A&M for another coaching position, he will not owe any money to the school.

Fisher's Aggies entered the 2021 season ranked No. 6 in the preseason standings, but after a 3–0 start and losing starting quarterback Haynes King to injury, they lost to then-ranked No. 16 Arkansas and unranked Mississippi State. Following two consecutive losses the Aggies defeated then-No. 1 ranked Alabama at home. With the win several records were broken. Fisher became the first former assistant coach of Nick Saban to defeat him, shattering Saban's then-perfect 24–0 record. The Aggies capitalized on the Alabama win with three consecutive SEC victories over unranked Missouri, South Carolina, and then-ranked No. 13 Auburn, but suffered losses to then-ranked No. 15 Ole Miss and unranked LSU. The team received an invite to the Gator Bowl, but opted out of the game allegedly due to COVID-19 issues. The 2021 team finished with an 8–4 record, ranked No. 25 in the final Coaches Poll and unranked in the final AP Poll.

The Aggies would enter the 2022 with high expectations, ranked #6 in the country. They lost six of their first nine games, including a shocking upset loss to unranked Appalachian State in the Aggies' second game. The Aggies suffered through a six-game losing streak during the season. 2022 marked the first time the Aggies had lost six consecutive games since the 1972 season. The team finished with a 5–7 mark, missing a bowl game, but ending the season on a positive note with an upset 38–23 victory over #5 LSU.

Fisher was fired as head coach on November 12, 2023, after having a 6–4 record through 10 games. His contract was bought out for $77.5 million, the largest buyout in college football history.

=== After Texas A&M ===
Following his departure from Texas A&M, Fisher became an analyst for the ACC Network and a contributor to ACC Huddle in 2025.

Fisher was an unofficial consultant for Memphis head coach Charles Huff during 2026 spring practices. He helped Huff, who wanted advice from veteran coaches, with studying film on recruits and worked with the Tigers' offense.

== Personal life ==
Fisher met his second wife during his coaching days at FSU. They married in the summer of 2020 and reside in College Station. Fisher has two sons from a previous marriage. Fisher's brother, Bryan, was the offensive coordinator at Fairmont State University and is now a teacher and runs the family farm.

Fisher's younger son, Ethan, was diagnosed in 2011 with Fanconi anemia. The diagnosis prompted Jimbo and Candi Fisher to found Kidz1stFund, which funds critical research for the disease. The University of Minnesota's Masonic Children's Hospital rechristened its FA program the Kidz1stFund Fanconi Anemia Comprehensive Care Center.

Fisher's older son Trey attended the University of Tennessee at Martin where he played quarterback for the football team. He later transferred to Florida A&M.

Fisher became known as "Jimbo" as a child because his family already had several members who went by "Jim." Some media outlets, following a Wikipedia hoax created by Fisher's son Trey, have said that Fisher was known as "Slim Jimbo" because of an "affinity for meat snacks" (an example being Slim Jim brand beef jerky) and that Fisher planned to start an organic jerky company after leaving the coaching profession. Fisher denied these reports in an interview, noting that while he enjoyed beef jerky, it had nothing to do with his nickname, and he had no intention of starting a company.

== Awards ==
- 1987: Division III National Player of the Year
- 2001: Broyles Assistant Coach of the Year Award finalist
- 2013: AFCA Regional Coach of the Year
- 2013: Rawlings Football College Coach of the Year

== Head coaching record ==
| Year | Team | Overall | Conference | Standing | Bowl/playoffs | Coaches^{#} | AP^{°} |
|---|---|---|---|---|---|---|---|
Florida State Seminoles (Atlantic Coast Conference) (2010–2017)
| 2010 | Florida State | 10–4 | 6–2 | 1st (Atlantic) | W Chick-Fil-A | 16 | 17 |
| 2011 | Florida State | 9–4 | 5–3 | T–2nd (Atlantic) | W Champs Sports | 23 | 23 |
| 2012 | Florida State | 12–2 | 7–1 | T–1st (Atlantic) | W Orange^{†} | 8 | 10 |
| 2013 | Florida State | 14–0 | 8–0 | 1st (Atlantic) | W BCS NCG^{†} | 1 | 1 |
| 2014 | Florida State | 13–1 | 8–0 | 1st (Atlantic) | L Rose^{†} | 6 | 5 |
| 2015 | Florida State | 10–3 | 6–2 | 2nd (Atlantic) | L Peach^{†} | 14 | 14 |
| 2016 | Florida State | 10–3 | 5–3 | 3rd (Atlantic) | W Orange^{†} | 8 | 8 |
| 2017 | Florida State | 5–6 (Note: Fisher left for Texas A&M during the regular season. Odell Haggins served as interim head coach for the Seminoles in their final game of the regular season and the Independence Bowl. Florida State finished the season with an overall record of 7–6.) | 3–5 | 6th (Atlantic) | | | |
| Florida State: | | 83–23 | 48–16 | | | | |
Texas A&M Aggies (Southeastern Conference) (2018–2023)
| 2018 | Texas A&M | 9–4 | 5–3 | T–2nd (Western) | W Gator | 16 | 16 |
| 2019 | Texas A&M | 8–5 | 4–4 | 4th (Western) | W Texas | | |
| 2020 | Texas A&M | 9–1 | 8–1 | 2nd (Western) | W Orange^{†} | 4 | 4 |
| 2021 | Texas A&M | 8–4 | 4–4 | T–3rd (Western) | Gator (Note: Texas A&M dropped out of bowl game due to a breakout of positive COVID-19 cases and season-ending injuries limiting them to too few players within the program and was replaced by Rutgers.) | 25 | |
| 2022 | Texas A&M | 5–7 | 2–6 | T–6th (Western) | | | |
| 2023 | Texas A&M | 6–4 (Note: Texas A&M fired Fisher with two games remaining.) | 4–3 | (Western) | | | |
| Texas A&M: | | 45–25 | 27–21 | | | | |
| Total: | | 128–48 | | | | | |
National championship Conference title Conference division title or championship game berth
^{†}Indicates BCS or CFP / New Years' Six bowl.; ^{#}Rankings from final Coaches Poll.; ^{°}Rankings from final AP Poll.
