= 2014 BCS National Championship Game =

College football bowl game

2014 Vizio BCS National Championship Game
- 16th BCS National Championship Game
Auburn Tigers	Florida State Seminoles
(12–1)	(13–0)
SEC	ACC
31	34
Head coach: Gus Malzahn	Head coach: Jimbo Fisher
AP / Coaches / BCS; 2 / 2 / 2	AP / Coaches / BCS; 1 / 1 / 1
	1	2	3	4	Total
Auburn	7	14	0	10	31
Florida State	3	7	3	21	34
- Date: January 6, 2014
- Season: 2013
- Stadium: Rose Bowl
- Location: Pasadena, California
- MVP: Offense: Jameis Winston (QB, FSU); Defense: P. J. Williams (DB, FSU)
- Favorite: Florida State by 8.5
- National anthem: John Legend
- Referee: John O'Neill (Big Ten)
- Halftime show: Auburn University Marching Band; Marching Chiefs
- Attendance: 94,208
- Payout: US$23.9 million to each team

United States TV coverage
- Network: ESPN and ESPN Radio
- Announcers: Brent Musburger (play-by-play); Kirk Herbstreit (analyst); Heather Cox and Tom Rinaldi (sideline) (ESPN); Mike Tirico, Todd Blackledge, Holly Rowe, and Joe Schad (ESPN Radio)
- Nielsen ratings: 15.7 (26 million viewers)

International TV coverage
- Network: ESPN Deportes

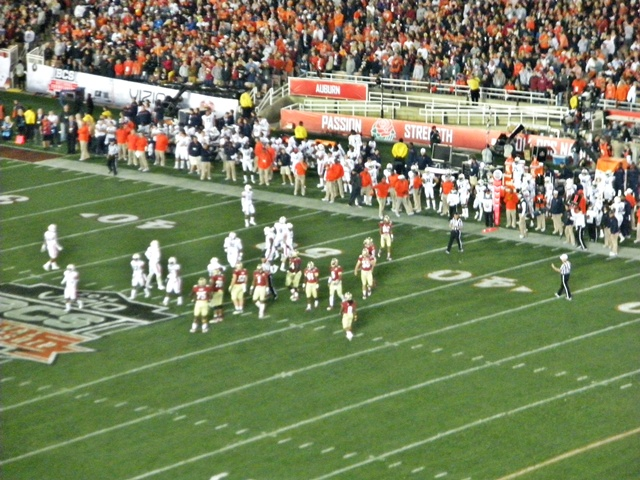
The Florida State Seminoles defeated the Auburn Tigers at the Rose Bowl, Pasadena Calif.

The 2014 BCS National Championship Game (branded as the 2014 Vizio BCS National Championship Game for sponsorship reasons) was the national championship game of the 2013 college football season, which took place on Monday, January 6, 2014, which was 5 days after the 2014 Rose Bowl took place at the same stadium. The game featured the Auburn Tigers and Florida State Seminoles. The game was played at the Rose Bowl Stadium in Pasadena, California, kicking off at 8:30 p.m. ET. The game was hosted by the Pasadena Tournament of Roses, the organizer of the annual Tournament of Roses Parade and the Rose Bowl Game on New Year's Day. The winner of the game, Florida State, was presented with the American Football Coaches Association's "The Coaches' Trophy", valued at $30,000. Pre-game festivities began at 4:30 p.m. PT. Face values of tickets were $385 and $325 (end zone seats) with both teams receiving a total of 40,000 tickets.

Florida State scored first on a 35-yard field goal to take an early 3–0 lead. Auburn responded with a touchdown in the first quarter and two in the second to storm out to a 21–3 lead. After a successful punt fake, the Seminoles managed a touchdown late in the second quarter, making it a 21–10 game in Auburn's favor going into halftime. Both teams dominated on defense in the third quarter with the Seminoles hitting a field goal to cut Auburn's lead to eight. In the fourth quarter, Florida State scored a touchdown early to make it a one-point game. Auburn extended its lead to 24–20 on a field goal, but Florida State took the lead 27–24 when Levonte Whitfield took the ensuing kickoff 100 yards for a touchdown. Auburn then retook the lead 31–27 with 1:19 remaining in the game, but Florida State was able to respond, winning the game 34–31 with a Kelvin Benjamin touchdown with 13 seconds left on the clock. It was the first national championship won by the Seminoles since 1999 and their third overall, ending a streak of seven straight championships won by the SEC.

For their performances in the game, quarterback Jameis Winston and defensive back P. J. Williams were named the game's most valuable players.

This was the 16th and last time the top two teams played for the Bowl Championship Series (BCS) title before implementation of a four-team College Football Playoff system the following season.

== Teams ==
Teams playing in this game were officially selected on Selection Sunday, December 8, 2013. They are the No. 1 and No. 2 nationally ranked teams in the final BCS standings. In the final BCS Standings, Florida State ended up ranked No. 1 and Auburn ended up ranked No. 2. Auburn and Florida State have played 17 times before, with Auburn leading the series, 13–4. Their last meeting was in 1990 at Auburn, Auburn winning 20–17.

The teams were housed in Newport Beach, Orange County. They held practices at UC Irvine (Auburn) in Irvine, CA and Orange Coast College (Florida State) in Costa Mesa, CA. On game day, Auburn wore its white away jerseys and used the west bench while Florida State wore its dark home jerseys and used the east bench.

=== Auburn ===
The Auburn Tigers staged a large turnaround in 2013, improving from a 3–9 record in 2012 to a 12–1 record in 2013. Auburn was coached by Gus Malzahn, who was in his first season at Auburn. The Tigers began the season unranked and were picked to finish fifth in the SEC West in the SEC Media Poll. The Tigers won their first three games of the season, before losing to LSU 21–35. The Tigers then won the final eight games of the regular season to move to an 11–1 record and a SEC West division title. Auburn's regular season was capped off by two improbable victories: the Prayer at Jordan–Hare and the Kick Six (Chris Davis' game-winning touchdown with a 109-yard return of a missed 57-yard field goal attempt). In the 2013 SEC Championship Game, the Tigers defeated Missouri 59–42. It was with the improbable finishes and the single-season turnaround that the Auburn Tigers were dubbed "a team of destiny." After Auburn's victory over Missouri in the SEC Championship, #10 Michigan State defeated #2 Ohio State 34–24 in the 2013 Big Ten Football Championship Game, keeping Ohio State out of the BCS Championship Game, while Auburn moved up to take Ohio State's spot.

The Tigers led the nation in rushing (335.69 yards per game). Auburn's rushing attack was led by Tre Mason, who rushed for 1,621 yards and 22 touchdowns. Wide receiver Sammie Coates had 38 catches for 841 yards and seven touchdowns, which was good enough to rank him second in the nation on yards per reception (21.3). Quarterback Nick Marshall threw for 1,759 yards, 12 touchdowns and five interceptions. Marshall also ran for 1,023 yards and 11 touchdowns.

Defensively, the Tigers were led by Dee Ford, who came into the game with 8.5 sacks. Auburn's defense as a whole had allowed 24.0 points per game in the season.

=== Florida State ===
Florida State entered the 2013 season ranked #11 in the AP Poll. Despite losing 11 starters to the 2013 NFL draft, the Seminoles were dominant during the 2013 season, winning by an average of 42.3 points en route to a 13–0 record. FSU's closest game was a 48–34 victory over Boston College. FSU's offense averaged 53 points per game, while the defense allowed only 10.7 points per game. The Noles’ second closest game was a 27-point win over Miami. However, the Seminoles schedule was rather weak, and was ranked just #62 in the country by Jeff Sagarin even after the BCS championship game. The team was coached by Jimbo Fisher, who was in his fourth season at Florida State.

Offensively, the Seminoles were led by Heisman Trophy winner, redshirt freshman quarterback Jameis Winston, who turned 20 years old on game day. Winston completed 237 of 349 passes with 3,820 yards for 38 touchdowns and 10 interceptions. The offense was also led by wide receivers Rashad Greene, Kenny Shaw and Kelvin Benjamin, who each had over 900 receiving yards. FSU's rushing attack was led by Devonta Freeman, who rushed for 943 yards. Roberto Aguayo lead the team in scoring with 147 points (perfect 90 PAT and 19 out of 20 field goal attempts).

Defensively, the Seminoles allowed 268.5 yards per game. Senior linebacker Telvin Smith led the team in tackles with 75, while safety Lamarcus Joyner led the team in sacks with 5.0.

== Starting lineups ==
Selected in an NFL Draft (number corresponds to draft round)

† = 2013 All-American

Florida State	Position		Auburn
Offense
Kelvin Benjamin 1	WR		Sammie Coates 3
†Cameron Erving 1	LT		Greg Robinson 1
Josue Matias	LG		Alex Kozan
†Bryan Stork 4	C		Reese Dismukes
Tre' Jackson 4	RG		Chad Slade
Bobby Hart 7	RT		Avery Young
Nick O'Leary 6	TE		C. J. Uzomah 5
Rashad Greene 5	WR		Ricardo Louis 4
†Jameis Winston 1	QB		Nick Marshall
Devonta Freeman 4	RB		†Tre Mason 3
Defense
Eddie Goldman 2	DE		Dee Ford 1
Timmy Jernigan 2	DT		Nosa Eguae
Nile Lawrence-Stample	DT		Gabe Wright 4
Mario Edwards Jr. 2	DE		Elijah Daniel
Dan Hicks	SLB		Robenson Therezie
Christian Jones	MLB	ILB	Jake Holland
Telvin Smith 5	WLB		Cassanova McKinzy
P. J. Williams 3	CB		Chris Davis
†Lamarcus Joyner 2	CB		Jonathon Mincy
Jalen Ramsey 1	S		Ryan Smith
Terrence Brooks 3	S		Jermaine Whitehead

== Game summary ==
Immediately after the 2014 Rose Bowl Game concluded, a fresh field was placed on top of the existing field. The field was laid on Thursday, and painting of the field began Friday. The field was completed Saturday in time for it to rest on Sunday for the championship game on Monday. The pregame singing of the national anthem was performed by John Legend.

The 2014 BCS National Championship Game kicked off at 8:30 p.m. EST at the Rose Bowl Stadium in Pasadena, California. A crowd of 94,208 people attended the game. The game was televised by ESPN, with Brent Musburger and Kirk Herbstreit as commentators. Other ESPN networks (including ESPN2, ESPNEWS, ESPN Classic, ESPNU, and ESPN3) provided supplemental coverage with analysis and additional perspectives of the game, which the network branded as the BCS Megacast. An estimated 26,061,000 people watched the game on ESPN, ESPN2 and ESPNEWS, for a combined Nielsen rating of 14.8.

=== First quarter ===
The opening kickoff went for a touchback, thus Auburn began its opening drive at its 25-yard line. On a third and 7 situation, the Tigers had a chance to score first when Auburn quarterback Nick Marshall threw a pass to an open Ricardo Louis. Marshall's pass fell short, however, forcing the Tigers to punt the ball away to FSU. On the Seminoles' first drive of the game, Florida State was able to drive to Auburn's red zone. However, on a third and 8 situation at Auburn's 16-yard line, Jameis Winston was sacked by Nosa Eguae, forcing the Seminoles to settle for a 35-yard field goal from Roberto Aguayo to give the Seminoles a 3–0 lead.

The ensuing Auburn drive ended in a punt. However, the Tigers were able to down the punt at FSU's 2-yard line. Auburn's defense then forced a three-and-out, forcing the Seminoles to punt from the endzone. Auburn's Chris Davis returned the punt 22 yards to Florida State's 25-yard line. Taking advantage of the good field position, Auburn went up 7–3 on a 12-yard touchdown pass to Tre Mason. On the ensuing Florida State drive, the Seminoles stalled at their 26-yard line after Winston was sacked by Dee Ford. On the punt return, Auburn was called for a roughing the kicker penalty, giving FSU a first down at the Seminoles' 41-yard line.

=== Second quarter ===
Florida State opened the second quarter with an incomplete pass to Rashad Greene, forcing the Seminoles to punt on fourth down. On the first play of Auburn's drive, Mason rushed for a 23-yard gain. On the next play, Auburn's Corey Grant was stopped for a three-yard loss. However, FSU received an unsportsmanlike conduct penalty, bring Auburn midfield. On the next play, Marshall connected to Melvin Ray for a 50-yard touchdown reception, giving Auburn a 14–3 lead. The next Florida State drive ended in a three-and-out, giving Auburn the ball back once again. Auburn was able to drive deep into Florida State territory. However, the Tigers came up empty after Cody Parkey missed a 33-yard field goal. Florida State did not hold on to the football long, however, when Winston fumbled at FSU's 27-yard line. Taking advantage of the turnover, Auburn went up 21–3 on a 4-yard touchdown run from Marshall.

On the following Florida State drive, the Seminoles faced a fourth and 4 situation at its own 40-yard line. FSU went for a fake punt, which was successfully converted after Karlos Williams ran seven yards for a first down. Six plays later, facing a third and 7 situation at Auburn's 24-yard line, Winston ran 21 yards for a first down. On the next play, the Seminoles made it a 21–10 game on a 3-yard Devonta Freeman rushing touchdown. The game remained 21–10 going into the half.

=== Third quarter ===
Florida State received the opening kickoff of the second half. The Seminoles went three-and-out on their first drive of the quarter, forcing the Seminoles to punt. Auburn received the punt at its 37-yard line and drove to Florida State territory. On a third and 8 play at FSU's 36-yard line, the Tigers were called for a holding penalty. On the next play, Nick Marshall's pass fell incomplete, forcing the Tigers to punt. The Seminoles began their second drive of the quarter at their 9-yard line and drove to Auburn's 24-yard line. Florida State was unable to convert a third and 8 situation, however, forcing to the Seminoles to settle for a 41-yard field goal. The field goal was successful, making it a 21–13 game. The game remained 21–13 in Auburn's favor going into the fourth quarter.

=== Fourth quarter ===
Florida State opened the fourth quarter punting the ball away to Auburn. On the ensuing Auburn drive, P. J. Williams intercepted Nick Marshall at FSU's 40-yard line. Willams fumbled the interception, but the fumble was recovered by teammate Lamarcus Joyner. Taking advantage of the turnover, the Seminoles cut into the Tigers' lead on an 11-yard touchdown pass to Chad Abram. Florida State's Devonta Freeman was called for a taunting penalty, pushing Florida State 15-yards back on the conversion attempt. In turn, Seminoles had to settle for an extra point instead of a two-point conversion, cutting FSU's deficit to 21–20. Auburn responded on its next drive with a 22-yard field goal from Cody Parkey to give Auburn a 24–20 lead with 4:42 remaining in the game. On the ensuing kickoff, FSU's Levonte Whitfield returned the kickoff 100 yards to give Florida State a 27–24 lead. Auburn retook the lead on a 37-yard rushing touchdown by Tre Mason to give Auburn a 31–27 lead with 1:19 remaining in the game. Levonte Whitfield received the kickoff again, but this time was only able to return the kickoff 17 yards to Florida State's 20-yard line.

Needing to go 80-yards for the win, Winston completed five of his first six passes of the drive, including a 49-yard pass to Rashad Greene, to take the Seminoles to Auburn's 5-yard line. After receiving a delay of game penalty, Florida State faced a third and 8 situation at Auburn's 10-yard line. On the next play, Winston's pass fell incomplete. However, Auburn's Chris Davis was called for a pass interference penalty in the endzone, giving FSU the ball at Auburn's 2-yard line. On the next play, Florida State took a 34–31 lead on a 2-yard touchdown pass to Kelvin Benjamin with 13 seconds remaining in the game. Auburn had one more chance to win the game. On the final play of the game, Auburn attempted several laterals in an effort to reach the endzone. However, Tre Mason was tackled at Auburn's 37-yard line with no time remaining, giving Florida State the victory and the National Championship.

=== Game notes ===
Florida State's deficit of 18-points was the largest ever overcome to win the BCS championship. FSU's win also ended the Southeastern Conference's seven-year winning streak in the national championship game. Texas had been the most recent non-SEC school to win a National Championship, in 2006.

== Scoring summary ==
Scoring summary

Quarter	Time	Drive			Team	Scoring information	Score	
Quarter	Time	Plays	Yards	TOP	Team	Scoring information	Florida State	Auburn
1	9:53	8	59	3:38	FSU	35-yard field goal by Roberto Aguayo	3	0
1	3:07	6	25	2:11	AUB	Tre Mason 12-yard touchdown reception from Nick Marshall, Cody Parkey kick good	3	7
2	13:48	3	85	1:01	AUB	Melvin Ray 50-yard touchdown reception from Marshall, Parkey kick good	3	14
2	5:01	6	27	2:19	AUB	Marshall 4-yard touchdown run, Parkey kick good	3	21
2	1:28	11	66	3:33	FSU	Devonta Freeman 3-yard touchdown run, Aguayo kick good	10	21
3	6:05	10	67	3:30	FSU	41-yard field goal by Aguayo	13	21
4	10:55	5	41	2:01	FSU	Chad Abram 11-yard touchdown reception from Jameis Winston, Aguayo kick good	20	21
4	4:42	12	69	6:13	AUB	22-yard field goal by Parkey	20	24
4	4:31	1	100	0:14	FSU	100-yard kickoff return by Kermit Whitfield, Aguayo kick good	27	24
4	1:19	8	75	3:12	AUB	Mason 37-yard touchdown run, Parkey kick good	27	31
4	0:13	7	80	1:06	FSU	Kelvin Benjamin 2-yard touchdown reception from Winston, Aguayo kick good	34	31
"TOP" = time of possession. For other American football terms, see Glossary of American football.							34	31

== Statistics ==
Statistics	Auburn	Florida State
First downs	25	19
Plays–yards	81–449	81–385
Rushes–yards	53–232	31–148
Passing yards	217	237
Passing: comp–att–int	14–27–1	20–35–0
Turnovers		
Time of possession	33:41	26:19

Quarterback Jameis Winston was named the game's offensive MVP. Winston completed 20 of his 35 passes for 2 touchdowns and 237 yards.

Auburn outgained FSU 449–385 in total yards. Auburn was also more efficient in converting third downs, converting 10 of 18 opportunities. FSU only went 2 for 12 on third downs.

Tigers quarterback Nick Marshall completed 14 of his 27 passes for 217 yards, 2 touchdowns and 1 interception. Marshall also had 45 rushing yards and 1 rushing touchdown. Tre Mason was Auburn's leading rusher, rushing for 195 yards on 34 carries for 1 touchdown. Sammie Coates was Auburn's leading receiver, catching 4 passes for 61 yards.

Florida State's leading rusher was Devonta Freeman, who rushed for 73 yards on 11 carries. Rashad Greene was the Seminole's leading receiver, catching 9 passes for 147 yards. Kelvin Benjamin was Florida State's second leading receiver, catching 4 passes for 54 yards and a touchdown.

By scoring 34 points in the game, Florida State set the all-time FBS record for scoring in a single season, with 723 points. The previous record was held by Oklahoma, who scored 716 points in 2008.

== Aftermath ==
Florida State's victory earned it the 2014 BCS national championship and brought the Seminoles' season to an end with an undefeated 14–0 record. This was FSU's third national title in school history. With the loss, Auburn ended its season with a 12–2 record and a #2 ranking in the AP and Coaches polls.

The 2014 BCS National Championship Game has been described as a classic. One writer described the game as the "perfect ending for the BCS." The game's back-and-forth nature and dramatic finish merited high praise for the game.

In the first half of the game Florida State had come to believe that Auburn assistant coach Dameyune Craig, who had spent the previous three seasons as FSU's quarterbacks coach, was helping Auburn identify FSU's offensive signals. After Kelvin Benjamin was recorded on broadcast yelling "Dameyune calling [out] all the plays" to Jimbo Fisher and Jameis Winston in the second quarter, FSU began using towels to shield their signals from Auburn. Before the towels were used FSU was gaining 4.14 yards per play on its first seven possessions, and afterwards this jumped by over 75% to 7.32 yards per play. Fisher stated in the press conference the next morning that "They had a couple of our signals a couple times and were getting to them...That’s part of the game. I don’t have a problem with that."

Several players on each team announced that they would leave early to enter the 2014 NFL draft. From Auburn, Greg Robinson and Tre Mason announced their intentions to leave early. From Florida State, Timmy Jernigan, James Wilder, Jr., Kelvin Benjamin and Devonta Freeman declared for the draft.

== Notes ==
- October 23, 2012 – Executive Director Bill Hancock announced the game, scheduled for Tuesday, January 7, would be moved to Monday to be "more fan-friendly."
- January 8, 2013 – It was announced that following this final BCS National Championship Game, the first College Football Playoff semifinal games would be held on January 1, 2015 at the Rose Bowl and Sugar Bowl, and that the first College Football Championship Game would be Monday, January 12, 2015.
- October 20, 2013 – First BCS Standings came out showing Alabama, Florida State, Oregon, Ohio State, Missouri, Stanford, Miami (FL), Baylor, Clemson, and Texas Tech as the top ten teams
- October 21, 2013 – In fifteen years, the teams named as the No. 1 and No. 2 teams on the first BCS standings of the season have only played twice for the national championship.
- November 30, 2013 – No. 1 Alabama loses to No. 4 Auburn, making the top two teams in the first BCS standings unlikely to play in the 2014 BCS National Championship Game, pending the results of all the conference championship games. No. 2 Florida State and No. 3 Ohio State remained undefeated after the weekend, but both must still play in the ACC and Big Ten Conference Games, respectively.
- December 7, 2013 – No. 3 Auburn defeats No. 5 Missouri in the SEC Championship; No. 1 Florida State defeats No. 20 Duke in the ACC Championship; No. 2 Ohio State loses to No. 10 Michigan State in the Big Ten Championship. Florida State is projected to play Auburn in the BCS National Championship Game.
- December 8, 2013 – Florida State is chosen as the #1 ranked team in the BCS to play Auburn as the #2 ranked team.
- December 23, 2013 – Auburn head coach Gus Malzahn was named AP's coach of the year.
- December 31, 2013 – Teams are scheduled to arrive in Southern California with welcome press conferences to be held at Downtown Disney.
- January 4, 2014 – Media Day.
- January 6, 2014
  - BCS National Championship Game tailgate parties, public tailgate party; Former Florida State coach Bobby Bowden (honorary captain) and former Auburn player Bo Jackson joined team captains for the game coin toss.
  - 2013 Heisman Trophy Winner Jameis Winston wins the 2014 BCS National Championship Game on his 20th Birthday.
