= Florida State Seminoles football statistical leaders =

The Florida State Seminoles football statistical leaders are individual statistical leaders of the Florida State Seminoles football program in various categories, including passing, rushing, receiving, total offense, defensive stats, and kicking. Within those areas, the lists identify single-game, single-season, and career leaders. The Seminoles represent Florida State University in the NCAA's Atlantic Coast Conference.

Florida State began competing in intercollegiate football in 1947. This relatively recent start date means that, unlike many other teams, the Seminoles do not divide statistics into a "modern" era and a "pre-modern" era in which complete statistics are unavailable. Thus, all of the lists below potentially include players from as far back as 1947.

These lists are dominated by more recent players for several reasons:

- Since 1947, seasons have increased from 10 games to 11 and then 12 games in length.
- The NCAA didn't allow freshmen to play varsity football until 1972 (with the exception of the World War II years), allowing players to have four-year careers.
- Bowl games only began counting toward single-season and career statistics in 2002. The Seminoles have played in a bowl game every year since the decision, giving players an extra game to accumulate statistics each year since 2002.
- Similarly, the Seminoles have played in the ACC Championship Game five times since it first occurred in 2005, giving players in those seasons an additional game to accumulate statistics.

These lists are updated through the end of the 2025 season.

== Passing ==
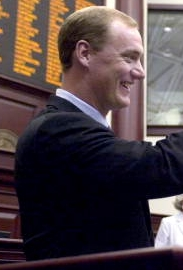
Heisman winner Chris Weinke is the Seminoles' all-time leader in passing yards and passing touchdowns.

=== Passing yards ===
Career
Rank	Player	Yards	Years
1	Chris Weinke	9,839	1997 1998 1999 2000
2	Jordan Travis	8,644	2019 2020 2021 2022 2023
3	Chris Rix	8,390	2001 2002 2003 2004
4	Jameis Winston	7,964	2013 2014
5	EJ Manuel	7,736	2009 2010 2011 2012
6	Drew Weatherford	7,567	2005 2006 2007 2008
7	Christian Ponder	6,872	2007 2008 2009 2010
8	Gary Huff	6,378	1970 1971 1972
9	Danny Kanell	6,372	1992 1993 1994 1995
10	Thad Busby	5,916	1994 1995 1996 1997

Single season
Rank	Player	Yards	Year
1	Chris Weinke	4,167	2000
2	Jameis Winston	4,057	2013
3	Jameis Winston	3,907	2014
4	EJ Manuel	3,392	2012
5	Deondre Francois	3,350	2016
6	Thad Busby	3,317	1997
7	Jordan Travis	3,214	2022
8	Drew Weatherford	3,208	2005
9	Peter Tom Willis	3,124	1989
10	Chris Rix	3,107	2003

Single game
Rank	Player	Yards	Year	Opponent
1	Chris Weinke	536	2000	Duke
2	Chris Weinke	521	2000	Clemson
3	Bill Cappleman	508	1969	Memphis State
4	Chris Weinke	496	2000	Miami
5	Peter Tom Willis	482	1989	Memphis State
6	Thad Busby	463	1997	North Carolina State
7	Danny Kanell	454	1995	Virginia
8	Charlie Ward	446	1993	Florida
9	Jameis Winston	444	2013	Clemson
10	Chris Weinke	443	2000	Georgia Tech

=== Passing touchdowns ===
Career
Rank	Player	TDs	Years
1	Chris Weinke	79	1997 1998 1999 2000
2	Jameis Winston	65	2013 2014
	Jordan Travis	65	2019 2020 2021 2022 2023
3	Chris Rix	63	2001 2002 2003 2004
4	Danny Kanell	57	1992 1993 1994 1995
5	Gary Huff	52	1970 1971 1972
6	Charlie Ward	49	1989 1991 1992 1993
7	EJ Manuel	47	2009 2010 2011 2012
8	Thad Busby	46	1994 1995 1996 1997
9	Christian Ponder	45	2007 2008 2009 2010
10	James Blackman	43	2017 2018 2019 2020

Single season
Rank	Player	TDs	Year
1	Jameis Winston	40	2013
2	Chris Weinke	33	2000
3	Danny Kanell	32	1995
4	Charlie Ward	27	1993
5	Bill Cappleman	25	1968
	Gary Huff	25	1972
	Thad Busby	25	1997
	Chris Weinke	25	1999
10	Chris Rix	24	2001
	Jordan Travis	24	2022

Single game
Rank	Player	TDs	Year	Opponent
1	Peter Tom Willis	6	1989	Memphis State
	Chris Weinke	6	1999	Maryland

== Rushing ==
=== Rushing yards ===
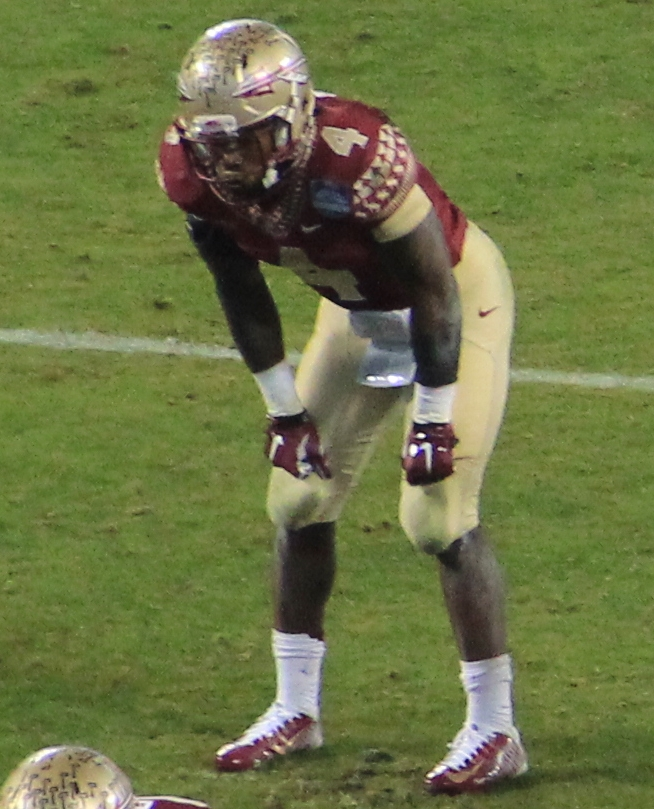
Dalvin Cook set career rushing records for the Seminoles in just 3 seasons.

Career
Rank	Player	Yards	Years
1	Dalvin Cook	4,464	2014 2015 2016
2	Warrick Dunn	3,959	1993 1994 1995 1996
3	Greg Allen	3,769	1981 1982 1983 1984
4	Travis Minor	3,218	1997 1998 1999 2000
5	Larry Key	2,953	1974 1975 1976 1977
6	Cam Akers	2,874	2017 2018 2019
7	Sammie Smith	2,539	1985 1986 1987 1988
8	Greg Jones	2,535	2000 2001 2002 2003
9	Lorenzo Booker	2,389	2003 2004 2005 2006
10	Devonta Freeman	2,255	2011 2012 2013
	Antone Smith	2,255	2005 2006 2007 2008

Single season
Rank	Player	Yards	Year
1	Dalvin Cook	1,765	2016
2	Dalvin Cook	1,691	2015
3	Warrick Dunn	1,242	1995
4	Sammie Smith	1,230	1987
5	Warrick Dunn	1,180	1996
6	Cam Akers	1,144	2019
7	Greg Allen	1,134	1983
8	Larry Key	1,117	1977
9	Warrick Dunn	1,026	1994
10	Cam Akers	1,024	2017

Single game
Rank	Player	Yards	Year	Opponent
1	Greg Allen	322	1981	Western Carolina
2	Dalvin Cook	267	2016	South Florida
3	Dalvin Cook	266	2015	South Florida
4	Sammie Smith	244	1987	East Carolina
5	Dalvin Cook	225	2016	Syracuse
6	Greg Allen	223	1984	Arizona State
7	Dalvin Cook	222	2015	Miami (FL)
8	Victor Floyd	212	1985	South Carolina
	Sammie Smith	212	1988	Tulane
10	Greg Allen	202	1981	LSU
	Sammie Smith	205	1986	Indiana

=== Rushing touchdowns ===
Career
Rank	Player	TDs	Years
1	Dalvin Cook	46	2014 2015 2016
2	Greg Allen	44	1981 1982 1983 1984
3	Warrick Dunn	37	1993 1994 1995 1996
4	Jordan Travis	31	2019 2020 2021 2022 2023
5	Devonta Freeman	30	2011 2012 2013
	Amp Lee	30	1989 1990 1991
7	Travis Minor	28	1997 1998 1999 2000
8	Cam Akers	27	2017 2018 2019
9	Antone Smith	26	2005 2006 2007 2008
10	Dayne Williams	24	1986 1987 1988

Single season
Rank	Player	TDs	Year
1	Greg Allen	20	1982
2	Dalvin Cook	19	2015
	Dalvin Cook	19	2016
4	Amp Lee	16	1990
5	Dayne Williams	15	1987
	Antone Smith	15	2008
7	Devonta Freeman	14	2013
	Cam Akers	14	2019
	Trey Benson	14	2023
9	Greg Allen	13	1983
	Warrick Dunn	13	1995

Single game
Rank	Player	TDs	Year	Opponent
1	Ashton Daniels	5	2026	Virginia
2	Greg Allen	4	1982	South Carolina
	Greg Allen	4	1982	Louisville
	Antone Smith	4	2008	Miami (FL)
	Dalvin Cook	4	2016	Clemson
	Dalvin Cook	4	2016	Syracuse
	Cam Akers	4	2019	Syracuse

== Receiving ==
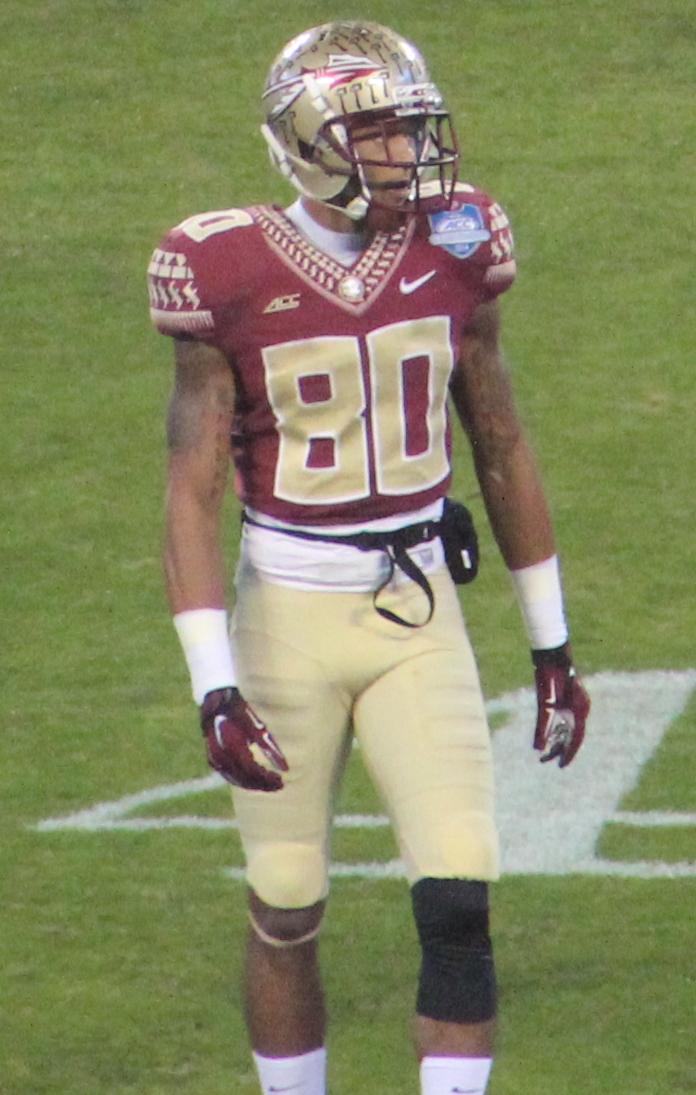
Rashad Greene is Florida State's career leader in receptions and receiving yards. He is tied for 2nd in receiving touchdowns.

=== Receptions ===
Career
Rank	Player	Rec	Years
1	Rashad Greene	270	2011 2012 2013 2014
2	Ron Sellers	212	1966 1967 1968
3	Peter Warrick	207	1996 1997 1998 1999
4	Kez McCorvey	189	1991 1992 1993 1994
5	Bert Reed	170	2008 2009 2010 2011
6	E.G. Green	166	1994 1995 1996 1997
7	Travis Rudolph	153	2014 2015 2016
8	Greg Carr	148	2005 2006 2007 2008
9	Chris Davis	137	2003 2004 2005 2006
10	Mike Shumann	134	1973 1974 1975

Single season
Rank	Player	Rec	Year
1	Rashad Greene	99	2014
2	Ron Sellers	86	1968
3	Rashad Greene	76	2013
4	Kez McCorvey	74	1993
5	Andre Cooper	71	1995
	Peter Warrick	71	1999
7	Ron Sellers	70	1967
8	Barry Smith	69	1972
9	Lawrence Dawsey	65	1990
	Anquan Boldin	65	2002

Single game
Rank	Player	Rec	Year	Opponent
1	Ron Sellers	16	1968	South Carolina
2	Ron Sellers	14	1967	Penn State
	Ron Sellers	14	1968	Wake Forest
	Ron Sellers	14	1968	Houston
5	Fred Biletnikoff	13	1964	Oklahoma
	Ron Sellers	13	1966	Virginia Tech
	Ron Sellers	13	1967	Alabama
	Ron Sellers	13	1968	Memphis State
	Kent Gaydos	13	1969	Houston
	Lawrence Dawsey	13	1990	Miami (FL)
	Rashad Greene	13	2014	Virginia
	Travis Rudolph	13	2016	Wake Forest

=== Receiving yards ===
Career
Rank	Player	Yards	Years
1	Rashad Greene	3,830	2011 2012 2013 2014
2	Ron Sellers	3,598	1966 1967 1968
3	Peter Warrick	3,517	1996 1997 1998 1999
4	E.G. Green	2,920	1994 1995 1996 1997
5	Kez McCorvey	2,660	1991 1992 1993 1994
6	Greg Carr	2,574	2005 2006 2007 2008
7	Barry Smith	2,392	1970 1971 1972
8	Travis Rudolph	2,311	2014 2015 2016
9	Mike Shumann	2,306	1973 1974 1975 1977
10	Craphonso Thorpe	2,153	2001 2002 2003 2004

Single season
Rank	Player	Yards	Year
1	Ron Sellers	1,496	1968
2	Rashad Greene	1,365	2014
3	Snoop Minnis	1,340	2000
4	Barry Smith	1,243	1972
5	Peter Warrick	1,232	1998
6	Ron Sellers	1,228	1967
7	Tamorrion Terry	1,188	2019
8	Rashad Greene	1,128	2013
9	Duce Robinson	1,081	2025
10	E.G. Green	1,059	1997

Single game
Rank	Player	Yards	Year	Opponent
1	Ron Sellers	260	1968	Wake Forest
2	Ron Sellers	259	1968	South Carolina
3	Peter Warrick	249	1997	Clemson
4	Travis Rudolph	238	2016	Wake Forest
5	Ron Sellers	229	1967	Virginia Tech
6	Ron Sellers	218	1968	Memphis State
7	Craphonso Thorpe	217	2003	Notre Dame
8	Ron Sellers	214	1968	Houston
9	Kelvin Benjamin	212	2013	Florida
10	Kez McCorvey	207	1994	Duke

=== Receiving touchdowns ===
Career
Rank	Player	TDs	Years
1	Peter Warrick	31	1996 1997 1998 1999
2	E.G. Green	29	1994 1995 1996 1997
	Ron Sellers	23	1966 1967 1968
	Greg Carr	29	2005 2006 2007 2008
	Rashad Greene	29	2011 2012 2013 2014
6	Barry Smith	25	1970 1971 1972
7	Andre Cooper	24	1993 1994 1995 1996
8	Anquan Boldin	21	1999 2000 2001 2002
	Jessie Hester	21	1981 1982 1983 1984
10	Lawrence Dawsey	20	1987 1988 1989 1990

Single season
Rank	Player	TDs	Year
1	Andre Cooper	15	1995
	Kelvin Benjamin	15	2013
3	Barry Smith	13	1972
	Anquan Boldin	13	2002
5	Ron Sellers	12	1968
	Peter Warrick	12	1998
	Greg Carr	12	2006
8	E.G. Green	11	1997
	Snoop Minnis	11	2000
	Talman Gardner	11	2001
	Craphonso Thorpe	11	2003
	Keon Coleman	11	2023

Single game
Rank	Player	TDs	Year	Opponent
1	Ron Sellers	5	1968	Wake Forest
2	Kelvin Benjamin	3	2013	Florida
	Keon Coleman	3	2023	LSU

== Total offense ==
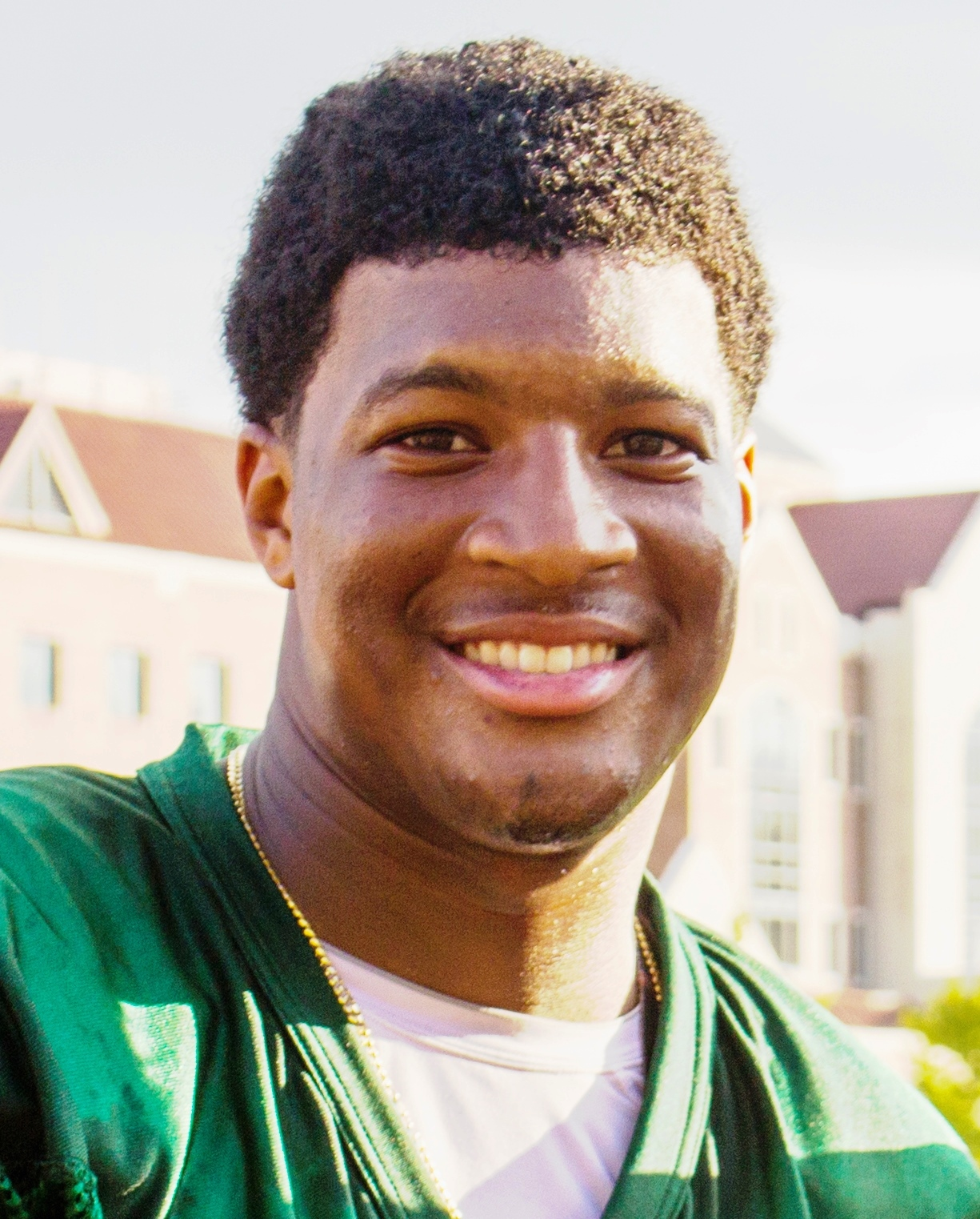
Heisman winner Jameis Winston holds the Seminole single-season records for total offense and total touchdowns and places high on both career lists, despite playing only two seasons.

Total offense is the sum of passing and rushing statistics. It does not include receiving or returns.

=== Total offense yards ===
Career
Rank	Player	Yards	Years
1	Jordan Travis	10,554	2019 2020 2021 2022 2023
2	Chris Weinke	9,473	1997 1998 1999 2000
3	Chris Rix	9,213	2001 2002 2003 2004
4	EJ Manuel	8,563	2009 2010 2011 2012
5	Jameis Winston	8,248	2013 2014
6	Christian Ponder	7,705	2007 2008 2009 2010
7	Drew Weatherford	7,604	2005 2006 2007 2008
8	Charlie Ward	6,636	1989 1991 1992 1993
9	Danny Kanell	6,176	1992 1993 1994 1995
10	Gary Huff	6,086	1970 1971 1972

Single season
Rank	Player	Yards	Year
1	Jameis Winston	4,276	2013
2	Chris Weinke	4,070	2000
3	Jameis Winston	3,972	2014
4	EJ Manuel	3,702	2012
5	Jordan Travis	3,631	2022
6	Deondre Francois	3,548	2016
7	Charlie Ward	3,371	1993
8	Tommy Castellanos	3,317	2025
9	Thad Busby	3,301	1997
10	Chris Rix	3,237	2003

Single game
Rank	Player	Yards	Year	Opponent
1	Chris Weinke	527	2000	Duke
2	Chris Weinke	509	2000	Clemson
3	Charlie Ward	506	1992	Maryland
4	Chris Weinke	496	2000	Miami (FL)
5	Bill Cappleman	490	1969	Memphis State
6	EJ Manuel	482	2012	Clemson
7	Deondre Francois	478	2016	Ole Miss
8	Charlie Ward	475	1993	Florida
9	Jordan Travis	468	2022	Oklahoma
10	Peter Tom Willis	452	1989	Memphis State

=== Touchdowns responsible for ===
"Touchdowns responsible for" is the official NCAA term for combined passing and rushing touchdowns.

Career
Rank	Player	TDs	Years
1	Jordan Travis	96	2019 2020 2021 2022 2023
2	Chris Weinke	81	1997 1998 1999 2000
3	Chris Rix	75	2001 2002 2003 2004
4	Jameis Winston	72	2013 2014
5	Charlie Ward	59	1989 1991 1992 1993
6	Danny Kanell	58	1992 1993 1994 1995
7	EJ Manuel	58	2009 2010 2011 2012
8	Christian Ponder	55	2007 2008 2009 2010
9	Gary Huff	54	1970 1971 1972
10	Thad Busby	51	1994 1995 1996 1997

Single season
Rank	Player	TDs	Year
1	Jameis Winston	44	2013
2	Chris Weinke	34	2000
3	Danny Kanell	32	1995
4	Charlie Ward	31	1993
	Jordan Travis	31	2022
6	Charlie Ward	28	1992
	Chris Rix	28	2003
	Jameis Winston	28	2014
9	Thad Busby	27	1997
	Chris Rix	27	2001
	EJ Manuel	27	2012
	Jordan Travis	27	2023

Single game
Rank	Player	TDs	Year	Opponent
1	Gary Huff	6	1971	South Carolina
	Peter Tom Willis	6	1989	Memphis State
	Chris Weinke	6	1999	Maryland

== Defense ==
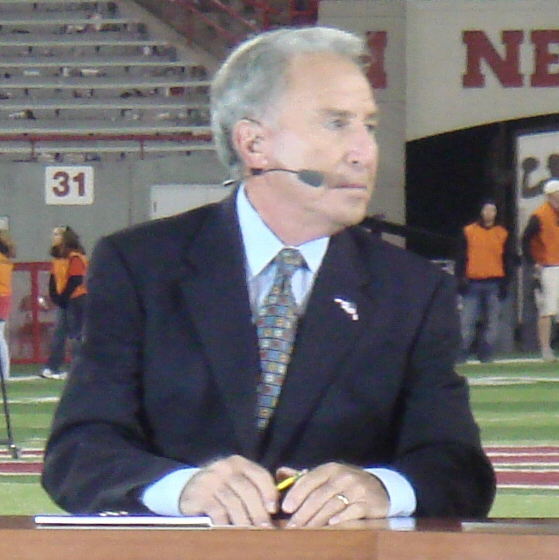
ESPN broadcaster Lee Corso is third on Florida State's career interceptions list. He also played quarterback for the Seminoles.

=== Interceptions ===
Career
Rank	Player	Ints	Years
1	Terrell Buckley	21	1989 1990 1991
2	Monk Bonasorte	15	1977 1978 1979 1980
3	Lee Corso	14	1953 1954 1955 1956
	Deion Sanders	14	1985 1986 1987 1988
5	Corey Sawyer	13	1991 1992 1993
6	Curt Campbell	12	1950 1951 1952
	Keith Jones	12	1978 1979 1980
	Brian McCrary	12	1981 1982 1983 1984
	Samari Rolle	12	1994 1995 1996 1997
	Tay Cody	12	1997 1998 1999 2000

Single season
Rank	Player	Ints	Year
1	Terrell Buckley	12	1991
2	Curt Campbell	8	1951
	Monk Bonasorte	8	1979
	Tarvarus McFadden	8	2016
5	LeRoy Butler	7	1989
	Corey Sawyer	7	1992
	Samari Rolle	7	1997
8	Ted Hewitt	6	1949
	Tommy Brown	6	1952
	Tom Feamster	6	1954
	Lee Corso	6	1954
	Bud Whitehead	6	1959
	Winfred Bailey	6	1964
	J. T. Thomas	6	1970
	Bobby Butler	6	1979
	Larry Harris	6	1982
	Terrell Buckley	6	1990
	Corey Sawyer	6	1993
	Mario Edwards	6	1998
	Tay Cody	6	2000
	Patrick Robinson	6	2007

Single game
Rank	Player	Ints	Year	Opponent
1	Mario Edwards	4	1998	Wake Forest

=== Tackles ===
Career
Rank	Player	Tackles	Years
1	Aaron Carter	512	1974 1975 1976 1977
2	Ron Simmons	483	1977 1978 1979 1980
3	Reggie Herring	452	1977 1978 1979 1980
4	Paul McGowan	446	1984 1985 1986 1987
5	Kirk Carruthers	435	1988 1989 1990 1991
6	Michael Boulware	377	2000 2001 2002 2003
7	Ken Roe	373	1980 1981 1982 1983
8	Marvin Jones	369	1990 1991 1992
9	Daryl Bush	362	1994 1995 1996 1997
10	Kendyll Pope	352	2000 2001 2002 2003

Single season
Rank	Player	Tackles	Year
1	Aaron Carter	181	1977
2	Dale McCullers	180	1967
3	Reggie Herring	170	1980
4	Dale McCullers	163	1968
5	Henry Taylor	159	1984
6	Jimmy Heggins	157	1977
7	Paul McGowan	150	1987

Single game
Rank	Player	Tackles	Year	Opponent
1	Dale McCullers	29	1968	Texas A&M

=== Sacks ===
Career
Rank	Player	Sacks	Years
1	Reinard Wilson	35.5	1993 1994 1995 1996
2	Peter Boulware	34.0	1994 1995 1996
3	DeMarcus Walker	28.5	2013 2014 2015 2016
4	Ron Simmons	25.0	1977 1978 1979 1980
5	Jamal Reynolds	23.5	1997 1998 1999 2000
	Björn Werner	23.5	2010 2011 2012
7	Andre Wadsworth	23.0	1994 1995 1996 1997
	Alonzo Jackson	23.0	1999 2000 2001 2002
	Everette Brown	23.0	2006 2007 2008
10	Brandon Jenkins	22.5	2009 2010 2011 2012

Single season
Rank	Player	Sacks	Year
1	Peter Boulware	19.0	1996
2	Andre Wadsworth	16.0	1997
	DeMarcus Walker	16.0	2016
4	Reinard Wilson	13.5	1996
	Everette Brown	13.5	2008
	Brandon Jenkins	13.5	2010
7	Alonzo Jackson	13.0	2002
	Björn Werner	13.0	2012
9	Ron Simmons	12.0	1977
	Jamal Reynolds	12.0	2000
	Jermaine Johnson II	12.0	2021

Single game
Rank	Player	Sacks	Year	Opponent
1	Willie Jones	5.0	1978	Florida

== Kicking ==
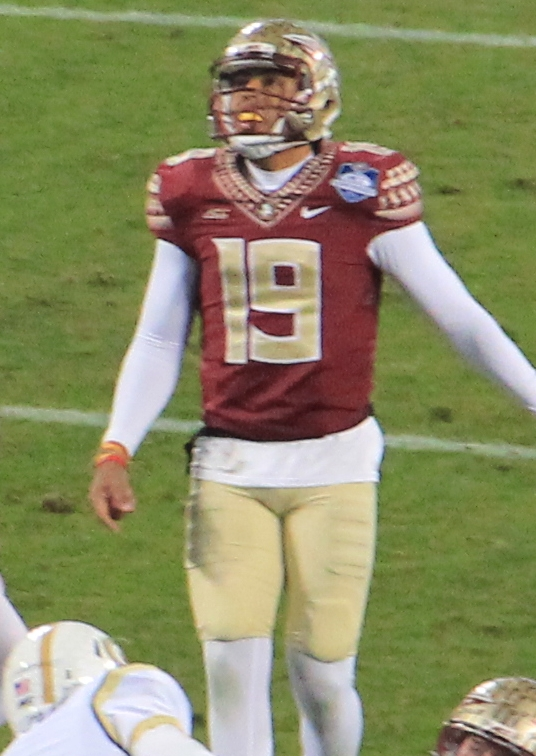
Roberto Aguayo is the second-most accurate kicker in Florida State history.

=== Field goals made ===
Career
Rank	Player	FGs	Years
1	Dustin Hopkins	88	2009 2010 2011 2012
2	Derek Schmidt	73	1984 1985 1986 1987
3	Roberto Aguayo	69	2013 2014 2015
4	Xavier Bietia	67	2001 2002 2003 2004
5	Sebastian Janikowski	66	1997 1998 1999
6	Gary Cismesia	65	2004 2005 2006 2007

Single season
Rank	Player	FGs	Year
1	Sebastian Janikowski	27	1998
	Gary Cismesia	27	2007
	Roberto Aguayo	27	2014
4	Dustin Hopkins	25	2012
5	Graham Gano	24	2008
6	Derek Schmidt	23	1987
	Sebastian Janikowski	23	1999
8	Bill Capece	22	1980
	Dustin Hopkins	22	2010
	Dustin Hopkins	22	2011

Single game
Rank	Player	FGs	Year	Opponent
1	Ricky Aguayo	6	2016	Ole Miss
2	Bill Capece	5	1980	Pittsburgh
	Sebastian Janikowski	5	1998	North Carolina State
	Sebastian Janikowski	5	1999	Maryland
	Gary Cismesia	5	2007	Miami (FL)
	Gary Cismesia	5	2007	Duke
	Roberto Aguayo	5	2014	Wake Forest

=== Field goal percentage ===
Career
Rank	Player	FG%	Years
1	Graham Gano	92.3%	2006 2007 2008
2	Roberto Aguayo	88.5%	2013 2014 2015
3	Sebastian Janikowski	79.5%	1997 1998 1999
4	Dustin Hopkins	78.6%	2009 2010 2011 2012
5	Ryan Fitzgerald	78.4%	2020 2021 2022 2023 2024
6	Gary Cismesia	78.3%	2004 2005 2006 2007
7	Xavier Bietia	72.8%	2001 2002 2003 2004
8	Derek Schmidt	70.2%	1984 1985 1986 1987

Single season
Rank	Player	FG%	Year
1	Ryan Fitzgerald	100.0%	2024
2	Roberto Aguayo	95.5%	2013
3	Xavier Beitia	92.9%	2001
4	Ryan Fitzgerald	90.5%	2023
5	Roberto Aguayo	90.0%	2014
6	Ricky Aguayo	85.7%	2017
7	Sebastian Janikowski	84.4%	1998
8	Dustin Hopkins	83.3%	2012
9	Derek Schmidt	82.1%	1987
10	Dustin Hopkins	81.5%	2011
