= 2014 Florida State Seminoles football team =

American college football season

2014 Florida State Seminoles football

ACC champion ACC Atlantic Division champion

ACC Championship, W 37–35 vs. Georgia Tech

Rose Bowl (CFP Semifinal), L 20–59 vs. Oregon
- Conference: Atlantic Coast Conference
- Atlantic Division

Ranking
- Coaches: No. 6
- AP: No. 5 (tie)
- CFP: No. 3
- Record: 13–1 (8–0 ACC)
- Head coach: Jimbo Fisher (5th season)
- Co-offensive coordinators: Lawrence Dawsey (1st season); Randy Sanders (1st season)
- Offensive scheme: Pro-style
- Defensive coordinator: Charles Kelly (1st season)
- Base defense: Multiple 4–3
- MVP: Dalvin Cook
- Captain: Mario Edwards Jr. Rashad Greene; Jared Haggins; Terrance Smith; Tre' Jackson; Christian Green; Cameron Erving; Josue Matías; Bobby Hart; Eddie Goldman; Nick Waisome; Desmond Hollin
- Home stadium: Doak Campbell Stadium

Uniform
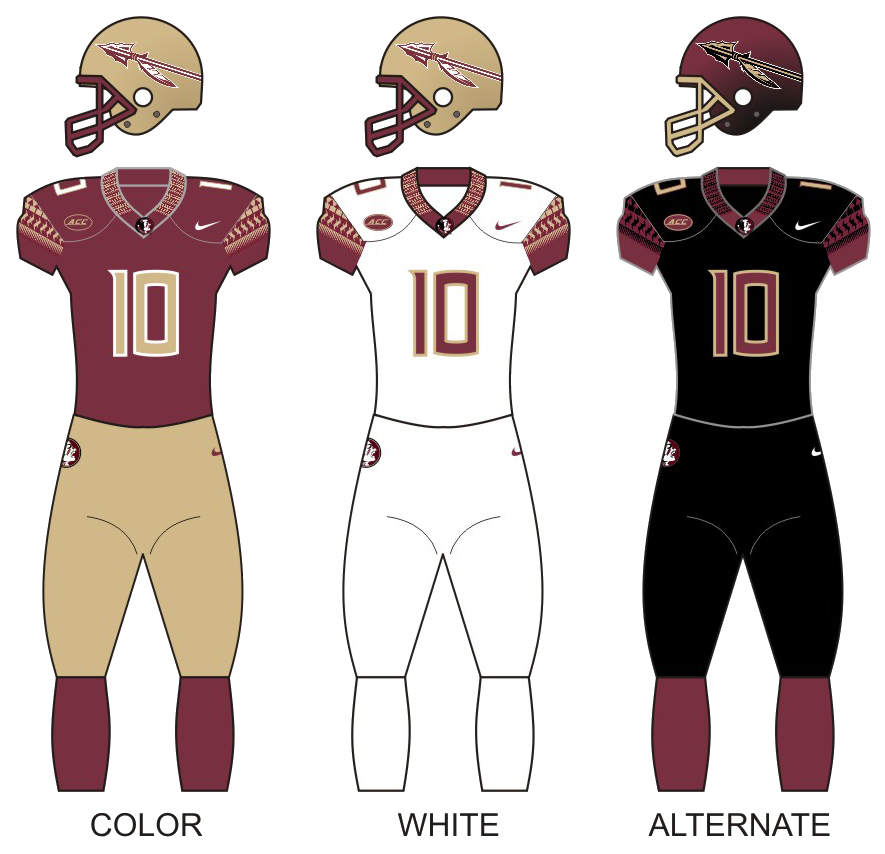

2014 Atlantic Coast Conference football standings
	Conf.			Overall
Team	W		L	W		L
Atlantic Division
No. T–5 Florida State x$^	8	–	0	13	–	1
No. 15 Clemson	6	–	2	10	–	3
No. 24 Louisville	5	–	3	9	–	4
Boston College	4	–	4	7	–	6
NC State	3	–	5	8	–	5
Syracuse	1	–	7	3	–	9
Wake Forest	1	–	7	3	–	9
Coastal Division
No. 8 Georgia Tech x	6	–	2	11	–	3
Duke	5	–	3	9	–	4
North Carolina	4	–	4	6	–	7
Pittsburgh	4	–	4	6	–	7
Miami (FL)	3	–	5	6	–	7
Virginia Tech	3	–	5	7	–	6
Virginia	3	–	5	5	–	7
Championship: Florida State 37, Georgia Tech 35
^ – College Football Playoff participant; $ – Conference champion; x – Division champion/co-champions; Rankings from AP Poll

The 2014 Florida State Seminoles football team, variously Florida State or FSU, represented Florida State University in the sport of American football during the 2014 NCAA Division I FBS college football season. Florida State competed in the Football Bowl Subdivision (FBS) of the National Collegiate Athletic Association (NCAA). The Seminoles were led by fifth-year head coach Jimbo Fisher and played their home games at Bobby Bowden Field at Doak Campbell Stadium in Tallahassee, Florida. They were members of the Atlantic Coast Conference, playing in the Atlantic Division. It was the Seminoles' 23rd season as a member of the ACC and its 10th in the ACC Atlantic Division.

Florida State entered the season as the defending national champion.

The Seminoles ended the regular season as the only team from a power conference without a loss, but finished the season with a 13–1 record. The Seminoles won the ACC Atlantic Division for the sixth time, advancing to their fifth conference championship game, where they defeated Georgia Tech to win their fifteenth conference title. Florida State was selected to play in the inaugural College Football Playoff, losing to Oregon in the semifinal at the Rose Bowl and snapping the Seminoles' 29-game win streak. Starting quarterback and 2013 Heisman Trophy winner Jameis Winston was the first pick in the NFL draft.

== Before the season ==
Seven players from the 2013 team were taken in the 2014 NFL draft.

=== Returning ===
==== Offense ====
- Jameis Winston
- Rashad Greene
- Nick O'Leary
- Cameron Erving
- Josue Matías
- Tre' Jackson
- Bobby Hart
- Kermit Whitfield

==== Defense ====
- Eddie Goldman
- Nile-Lawrence Stample
- Mario Edwards
- Terrance Smith
- Ronald Darby
- P. J. Williams
- Jalen Ramsey
- Nick Waisome
- Demarcus Walker

==== Special teams ====
- Roberto Aguayo
- Cason Beatty

=== Departures ===
==== Offense ====
- Chad Abram
- Kenny Shaw
- Bryan Stork
- Kelvin Benjamin
- Devonta Freeman
- James Wilder Jr.

==== Defense ====
- Jacobbi McDaniel
- Christian Jones
- Telvin Smith
- Terrence Brooks
- Lamarcus Joyner
- Timmy Jernigan
- Demonte McAllister

=== Transfers ===
==== Offense ====
- Jacob Coker

=== Recruiting class ===
College recruiting
Name	Hometown	School	Height	Weight	40^{‡}	Commit date
Kareem Are; OL	Fort Scott, Kansas	Fort Scott CC	6 ft 6 in (1.98 m)	300 lb (140 kg)	N/A	Dec 18, 2013
Kareem Are; OL	Recruit ratings: Scout: Rivals: 247Sports: ESPN:					
Demarcus Christmas; DT	Bradenton, Florida	Manatee HS	6 ft 3 in (1.91 m)	285 lb (129 kg)	N/A	Oct 1, 2012
Demarcus Christmas; DT	Recruit ratings: Scout: Rivals: 247Sports: ESPN:					
Dalvin Cook; RB	Miami	Miami Central HS	5 ft 11 in (1.80 m)	192 lb (87 kg)	N/A	Dec 31, 2013
Dalvin Cook; RB	Recruit ratings: Scout: Rivals: 247Sports: ESPN:					
J.J. Cosentino; QB	Pittsburgh	Central Catholic HS	6 ft 4 in (1.93 m)	216 lb (98 kg)	N/A	Mar 18, 2013
J.J. Cosentino; QB	Recruit ratings: Scout: Rivals: 247Sports: ESPN:					
Kain Daub; LB	Jacksonville, Florida	Sandalwood HS	6 ft 3 in (1.91 m)	240 lb (110 kg)	N/A	Apr 6, 2013
Kain Daub; LB	Recruit ratings: Scout: Rivals: 247Sports: ESPN:					
Alec Eberle; OL	Mechanicsville, Virginia	Atlee HS	6 ft 4 in (1.93 m)	270 lb (120 kg)	5.10	May 1, 2013
Alec Eberle; OL	Recruit ratings: Scout: Rivals: 247Sports: ESPN:					
Lorenzo Featherston; DE	Greensboro, North Carolina	Page HS	6 ft 7 in (2.01 m)	215 lb (98 kg)	N/A	Jan 1, 2014
Lorenzo Featherston; DE	Recruit ratings: Scout: Rivals: 247Sports: ESPN:					
Ethan Frith; OL	Summit, Mississippi	North Pike HS	6 ft 7 in (2.01 m)	300 lb (140 kg)	N/A	Jun 14, 2013
Ethan Frith; OL	Recruit ratings: Scout: Rivals: 247Sports: ESPN:					
Stephen Gabbard; OL	Tallahassee, Florida	Godby HS	6 ft 3 in (1.91 m)	215 lb (98 kg)	N/A	Jun 15, 2013
Stephen Gabbard; OL	Recruit ratings: Scout: Rivals: 247Sports: ESPN:					
Ja'Von Harrison; WR	Lakeland, Florida	Kathleen HS	6 ft 2 in (1.88 m)	190 lb (86 kg)	N/A	Feb 5, 2014
Ja'Von Harrison; WR	Recruit ratings: Scout: Rivals: 247Sports: ESPN:					
Ryan Izzo; TE	Sparta, New Jersey	Pope John XXIII HS	6 ft 6 in (1.98 m)	220 lb (100 kg)	N/A	Sep 23, 2013
Ryan Izzo; TE	Recruit ratings: Scout: Rivals: 247Sports: ESPN:					
Malique Jackson; ATH	Jesup, Georgia	Wayne County HS	5 ft 11 in (1.80 m)	168 lb (76 kg)	4.46	Jun 15, 2013
Malique Jackson; ATH	Recruit ratings: Scout: Rivals: 247Sports: ESPN:					
Roderick Johnson; OL	Florissant, Missouri	Hazelwood Central HS	6 ft 7 in (2.01 m)	310 lb (140 kg)	N/A	Feb 5, 2014
Roderick Johnson; OL	Recruit ratings: Scout: Rivals: 247Sports: ESPN:					
Frederick Jones; DT	Miami	Miami Central HS	6 ft 2 in (1.88 m)	270 lb (120 kg)	N/A	Jul 22, 2013
Frederick Jones; DT	Recruit ratings: Scout: Rivals: 247Sports: ESPN:					
Derrick Kelly, Jr. OL	Havana, Florida	East Gadsden HS	6 ft 5 in (1.96 m)	290 lb (130 kg)	N/A	Feb 5, 2014
Derrick Kelly, Jr. OL	Recruit ratings: Scout: Rivals: 247Sports: ESPN:					
Ermon Lane; WR	Homestead, Florida	Homestead HS	6 ft 2 in (1.88 m)	172 lb (78 kg)	N/A	Feb 5, 2014
Ermon Lane; WR	Recruit ratings: Scout: Rivals: 247Sports: ESPN:					
Rick Leonard; DE	Middletown, Maryland	Middletown HS	6 ft 7 in (2.01 m)	250 lb (110 kg)	4.72	Aug 13, 2013
Rick Leonard; DE	Recruit ratings: Scout: Rivals: 247Sports: ESPN:					
Trey Marshall; DB	Lake City, Florida	Columbia HS	6 ft 0 in (1.83 m)	192 lb (87 kg)	N/A	Jul 3, 2013
Trey Marshall; DB	Recruit ratings: Scout: Rivals: 247Sports: ESPN:					
Corey Martinez; OL	Tampa, Florida	Tampa Catholic HS	6 ft 4 in (1.93 m)	290 lb (130 kg)	N/A	Jul 3, 2013
Corey Martinez; OL	Recruit ratings: Scout: Rivals: 247Sports: ESPN:					
Chad Mavety; OL	Garden City, New York	Nassau C.C.	6 ft 6 in (1.98 m)	320 lb (150 kg)	N/A	Dec 9, 2013
Chad Mavety; OL	Recruit ratings: Scout: Rivals: 247Sports: ESPN:					
Derrick Nnadi; DT	Virginia Beach, Virginia	Ocean Lakes HS	6 ft 1 in (1.85 m)	299 lb (136 kg)	N/A	Feb 5, 2014
Derrick Nnadi; DT	Recruit ratings: Scout: Rivals: 247Sports: ESPN:					
Jacob Pugh; LB	Tallahassee, Florida	Godby HS	6 ft 4 in (1.93 m)	236 lb (107 kg)	N/A	May 29, 2013
Jacob Pugh; LB	Recruit ratings: Scout: Rivals: 247Sports: ESPN:					
Delvin Purifoy; LB	Pensacola, Florida	Catholic HS	6 ft 2 in (1.88 m)	228 lb (103 kg)	4.70	Jan 3, 2013
Delvin Purifoy; LB	Recruit ratings: Scout: Rivals: 247Sports: ESPN:					
Brock Ruble; OL	Hyattsville, Maryland	DeMatha HS	6 ft 8 in (2.03 m)	321 lb (146 kg)	N/A	Dec 13, 2013
Brock Ruble; OL	Recruit ratings: Scout: Rivals: 247Sports: ESPN:					
Travis Rudolph; WR	West Palm Beach, Florida	Cardinal Newman HS	6 ft 0 in (1.83 m)	189 lb (86 kg)	N/A	Jan 2, 2014
Travis Rudolph; WR	Recruit ratings: Scout: Rivals: 247Sports: ESPN:					
Mavin Saunders; TE	Houston	Kinkaid HS	6 ft 5 in (1.96 m)	233 lb (106 kg)	N/A	Jun 15, 2013
Mavin Saunders; TE	Recruit ratings: Scout: Rivals: 247Sports: ESPN:					
Adam Torres; DT	Lake Mary, Florida	Lake Mary HS	6 ft 5 in (1.96 m)	265 lb (120 kg)	N/A	Jul 29, 2013
Adam Torres; DT	Recruit ratings: Scout: Rivals: 247Sports: ESPN:					
Jonathan Vickers; RB	Tallahassee, Florida	North Florida Christian HS	6 ft 0 in (1.83 m)	205 lb (93 kg)	N/A	Jul 19, 2013
Jonathan Vickers; RB	Recruit ratings: Scout: Rivals: 247Sports: ESPN:					
Arthur Williams; DT	Fayetteville, North Carolina	E.E. Smith HS	6 ft 5 in (1.96 m)	298 lb (135 kg)	5.15	Oct 22, 2013
Arthur Williams; DT	Recruit ratings: Scout: Rivals: 247Sports: ESPN:					
Overall recruit ranking: Scout: 3 Rivals: 4 247Sports: 4 ESPN: 3
‡ Refers to 40-yard dash; Note: In many cases, Scout, Rivals, 247Sports, On3, and ESPN may conflict in their listings of height, weight and 40 time.; In these cases, the average was taken. ESPN grades are on a 100-point scale.; Sources: "Florida State 2014 Football Commitments". Rivals.; "2014 Florida State Commits". Scout.; "2014 Player Commitments – Florida State". ESPN.; "Scout.com Team Recruiting Rankings". Scout.; "2014 Team Ranking". Rivals.com.

=== Coaching changes ===
Prior to the start of the season, defensive coordinator Jeremy Pruitt left his position at Florida State to take the same job at the University of Georgia. Linebackers coach Charles Kelly was promoted to defensive coordinator while wide receivers coach Lawrence Dawsey and quarterbacks coach Randy Sanders were promoted as offensive coordinators. To round out the coaching staff, Bill Miller was hired to coach linebackers.

=== Spring game ===
The annual 'Garnet & Gold Game' was held on April 12 at Doak S. Campbell Stadium. The Garnet team, led by quarterback Jameis Winston, was victorious with a 31–14 win over the Gold team.

Florida State Spring Game

Quarter	1	2	3	4	Total
Gold	7	0	0	7	14
Garnet	0	24	0	7	31

at Doak Campbell Stadium • Tallahassee, Florida

- Date: April 12, 2014
- Game time: 3:00 p.m. EST
- Game attendance: 36,500

== Personnel ==
=== Coaching staff ===
Florida State Seminoles coaches

Head coach

- Jimbo Fisher

Assistant coaches

- Rick Trickett– Assistant head coach and offensive line coach
- Charles Kelly – Defensive coordinator and secondary coach
- Randy Sanders – Co-Offensive coordinator/quarterbacks coach
- Lawrence Dawsey – Co-Offensive coordinator/wide receivers coach
- Sal Sunseri – Defensive head coach/defensive ends coach
- Odell Haggins – Associate coach/defensive line coach
- Jay Graham – Special teams coordinator
- Tim Brewster – Tight ends coach/recruiting coordinator
- Bill Miller – Linebackers coach
- Vic viloria – Head strength and conditioning coach

Support staff

- Addison Lynch
- Kurt Kennedy
- Jeremiah Wilson
- Brian Williams
- Jamie Mujeni
- Bert Biffani
- David Spurlock
- Justin Bright
- Chris Revell
- Matt McCutchan
- Andrew Priest
- Mike Warren
- Myles Notkin
- Mario Edwards Sr.

=== Roster ===
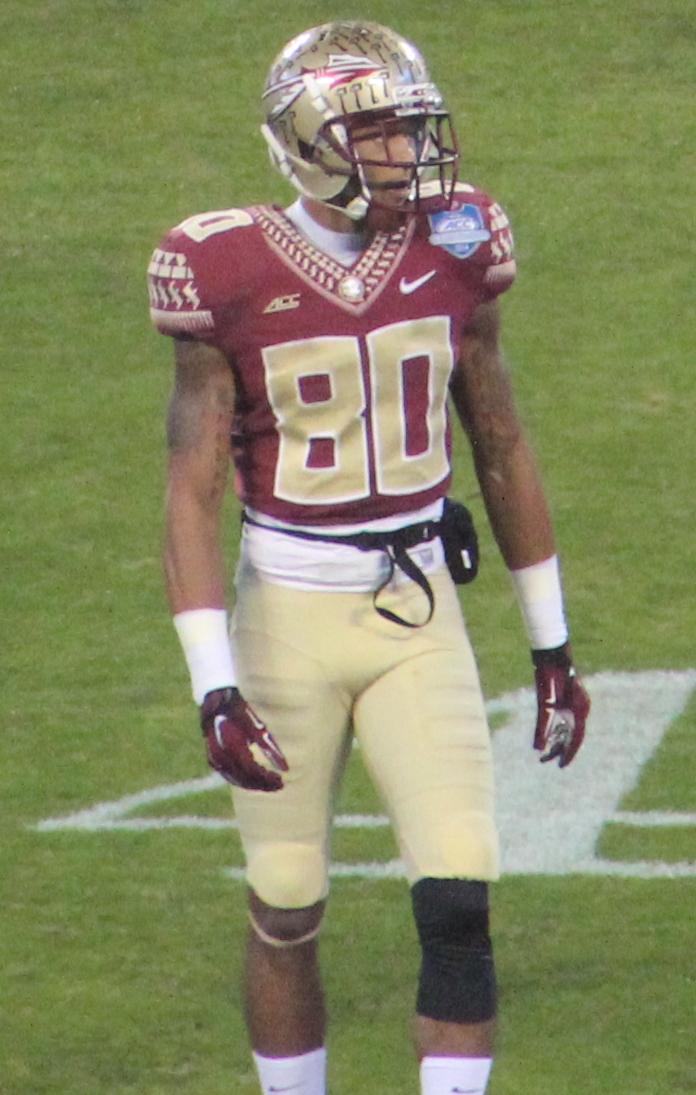
Wide receiver Rashad Greene

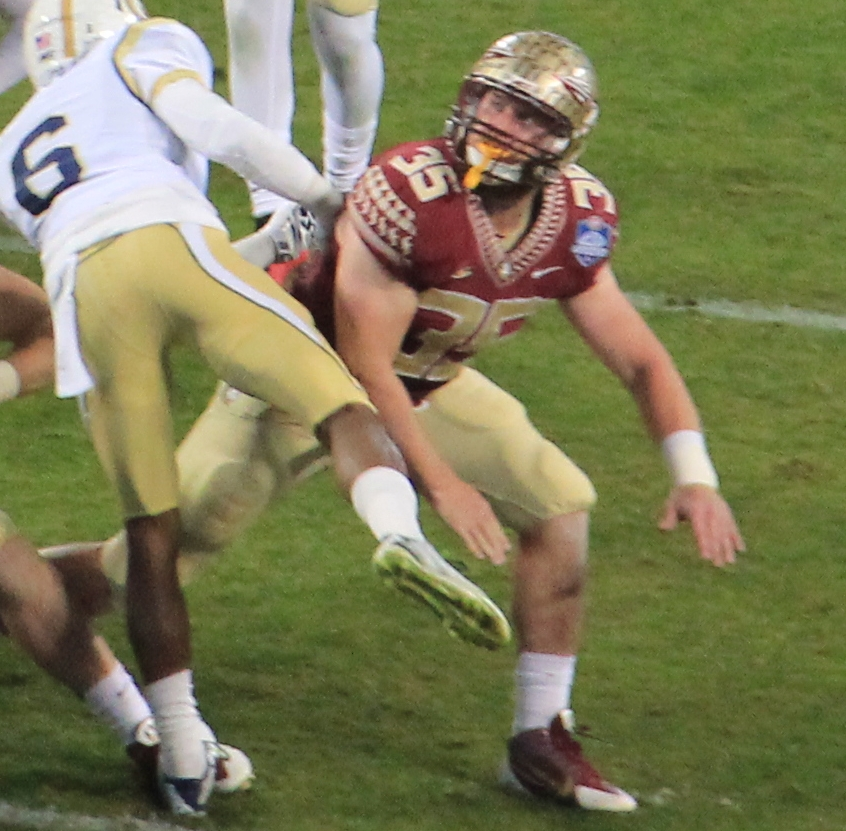
Tight end Nick O'Leary

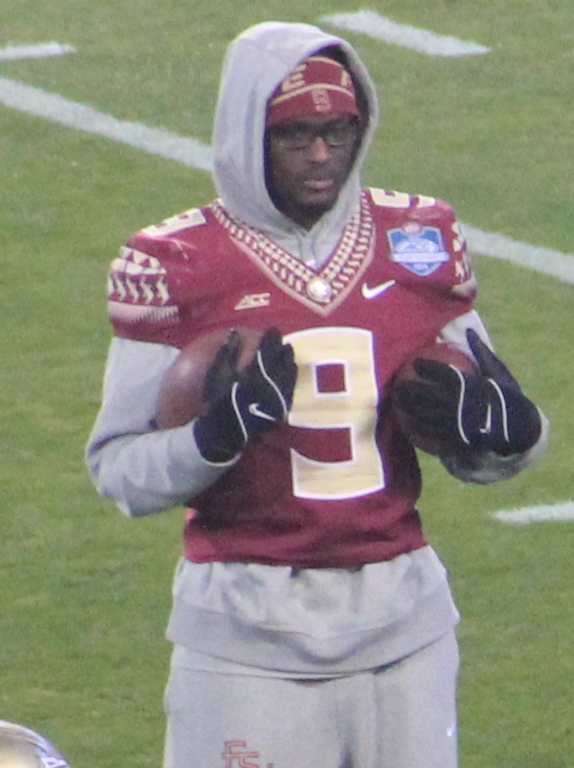
Runningback Karlos Williams

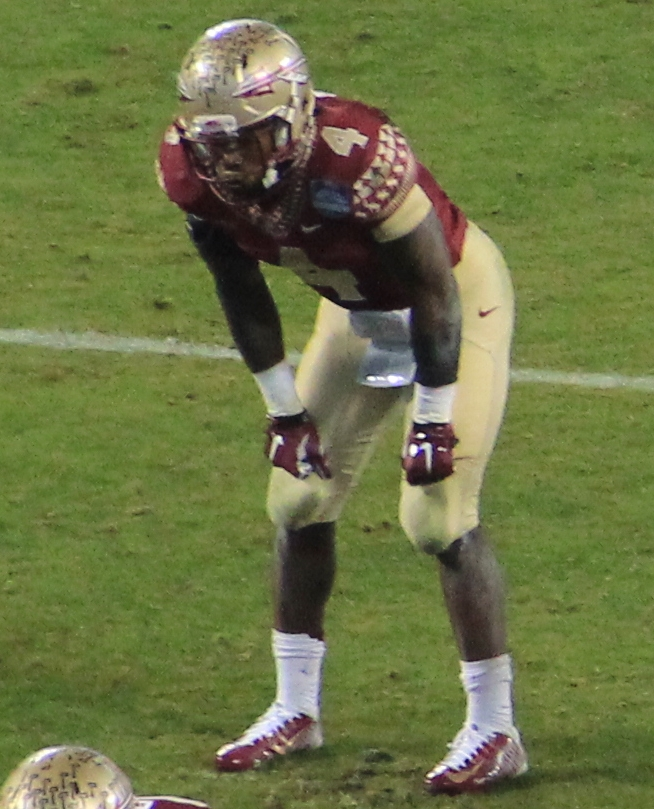
Runningback Dalvin Cook

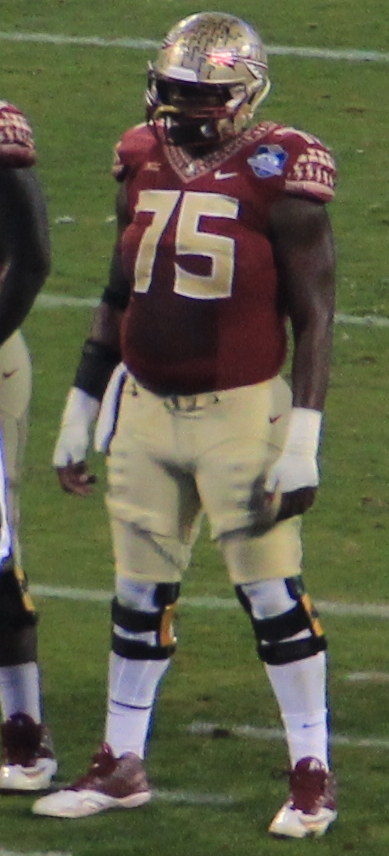
Offensive lineman Cameron Erving

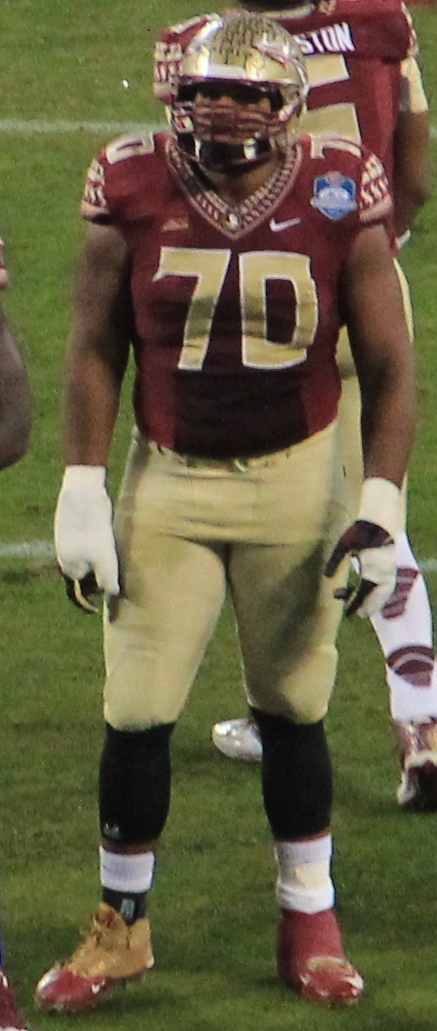
Offensive lineman Josue Matias

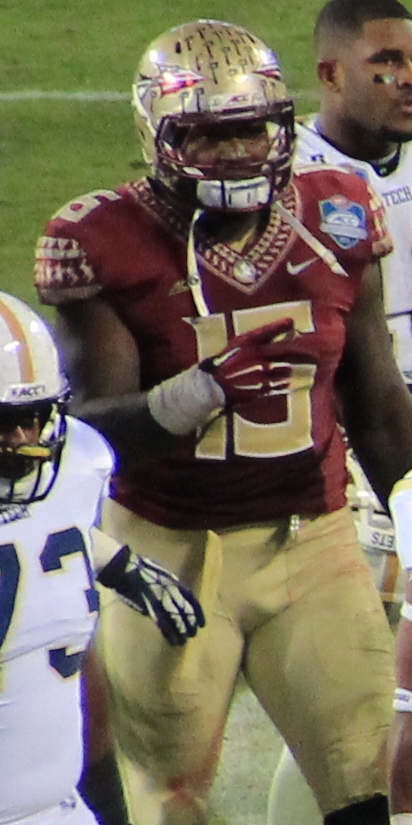
Defensive lineman Mario Edwards Jr.

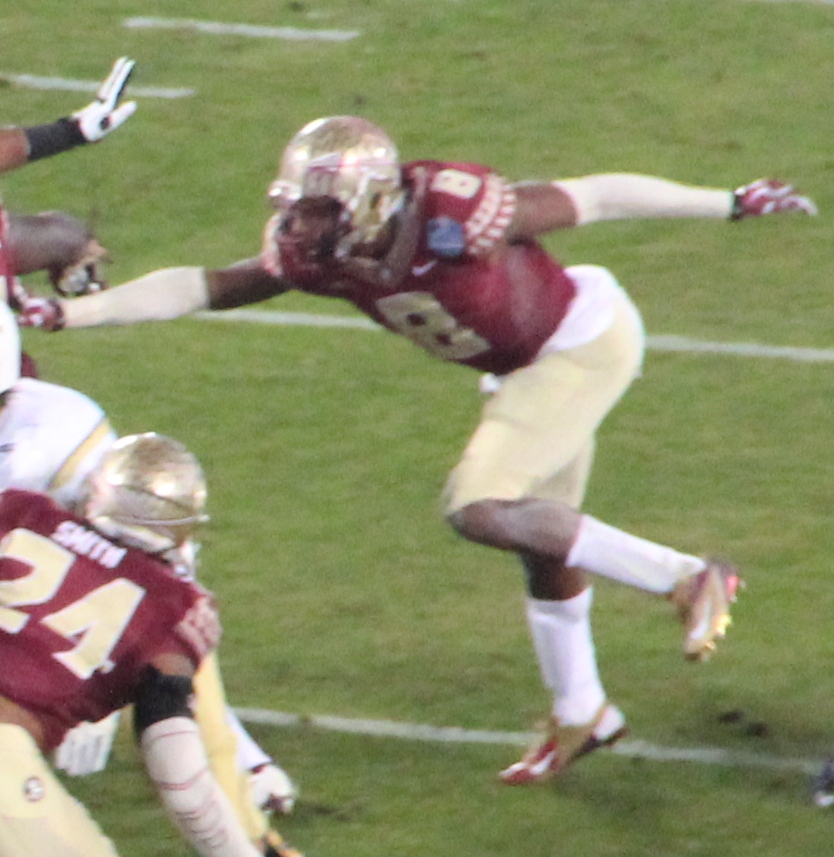
Safety Jalen Ramsey

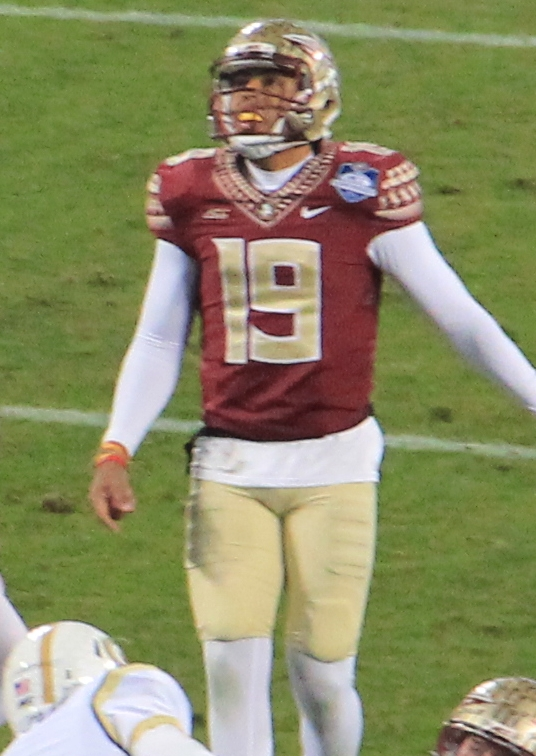
Kicker Roberto Aguayo

2014 Florida State Seminoles
Quarterback: 5 Jameis Winston – (redshirt) sophomore (6'4, 227); 10 Sean Maguire – (redshirt) sophomore (6'3, 215); 11 John Franklin III – (redshirt) freshman (6'0, 171); 16 J.J. Cosentino – freshman (6'4, 216); 19 Troy Cook – (redshirt) freshman (6'2, 198); 21 Lucas Clark – junior (6'1, 195); Running back: 4 Dalvin Cook – freshman (5'11, 190); 6 Ryan Green – sophomore (5'10, 195); 7 Mario Pender – (redshirt) sophomore (5'10, 192); 9 Karlos Williams – senior (6'1, 230); 22 Jonathan Vickers – freshman (6'0, 205); 23 Freddie Stevenson – sophomore (6'1, 237) (FB); 45 Will Burnham – (redshirt) junior (6'0, 185); Wide receiver: 1 Ermon Lane – freshman (6'2, 172); 3 Jesus Wilson – sophomore (5'9, 177); 8 Levonte 'Kermit' Whitfield – sophomore (5'7, 178); 12 Jarred Haggins – (redshirt) senior (6'0, 205); 13 Ja'Vonn Harrison – freshman (6'2, 190); 13 Rashad Gholston – (redshirt) senior (5'10, 167); 15 Travis Rudolph – freshman (6'0, 189); 18 Christian Griffith – (redshirt) junior (6'6, 203); 20 Bobby Lyons – freshman (6'0, 191); 24 Matthew McNulty – (redshirt) senior (6'3, 185); 32 Steven Williams – junior (5'7, 175); 38 Chet Iwuagwu – freshman (5'10, 172); 80 Rashad Greene – senior (6'0, 180); 82 Bryan LaCivita – sophomore (6'1, 180); 83 Dan O'Neill – senior (6'0, 175); 84 Isaiah Jones – (redshirt) freshman (6'4, 200); 86 Justin Motlow – freshman (5'11, 182); 87 Jared Jackson – (redshirt) freshman (6'3, 190); 89 Christian Green – (redshirt) senior (6'2, 205); Tight end: 33 Kevin Haplea – (redshirt) senior (6'4, 245); 35 Nick O'Leary – senior (6'3, 248); 46 Jayon Young – (redshirt) sophomore (6'1, 223); 49 Brandyn Musgrave – (redshirt) junior (6'0, 229); 81 Ryan Izzo – freshman (6'6, 220); 85 Jeremy Kerr – (redshirt) freshman (6'5, 254); 88 Mavin Saunders – freshman (6'5, 233)	Offensive line: 51 Bobby Hart – senior (6'4, 315); 54 Tre' Jackson – senior (6'4, 330); 55 Chad Mavety – junior (6'6, 320); 57 Corey Martinez – freshman (6'4, 290); 59 Ryan Hoefield – (redshirt) freshman (6'3, 292); 60 Cody Jay – (redshirt) senior (6'1, 250); 62 Austin Barron – senior (6'3, 300); 63 Larry Levy – (redshirt) senior (6'2, 275); 65 Ruben Carter – (redshirt) junior (6'4, 309); 66 Keith Weeks – (redshirt) sophomore (6'4, 303); 68 Brock Ruble – freshman (6'8, 321); 70 Josue Matías – senior (6'6, 322); 71 Alec Eberle – freshman (6'4, 270); 72 Kareem Are – freshman (6'6, 335); 74 Derrick Kelly Jr. – freshman (6'5, 290); 75 Cameron Erving – (redshirt) senior (6'6, 320); 76 Marcel Benalcazar – sophomore (6'6, 305); 77 Roderick Johnson – freshman (6'7, 310); 78 Wilson Bell – sophomore (6'4, 314); Defensive line: 4 Giorgio Newberry – (redshirt) junior (6'6, 280); 11 Derrick Mitchell – (redshirt) junior (6'4, 295); 15 Mario Edwards Jr. – junior (6'3, 277); 21 Chris Casher – (redshirt) sophomore (6'4, 260); 41 Lorenzo Featherston – freshman (6'7, 215); 43 Desmond Hollin – senior (6'3, 268); 44 DeMarcus Walker – sophomore (6'3, 274); 67 Adam Torres – freshman (6'5, 265); 90 Eddie Goldman – junior (6'4, 313); 91 Derrick Nnadi – freshman (6'1, 299); 92 Justin Shanks – (redshirt) sophomore (6'2 313); 93 Demarcus Christmas – freshman (6'3, 285); 93 Brad Bentz – (redshirt) junior (6'2 265); 94 Frederick Jones – freshman (6'2, 270); 95 Keith Bryant – (redshirt) freshman (6'2, 312); 96 Arthur Williams – freshman (6'5, 298); 98 Rick Leonard – freshman (6'7, 250); 99 Nile Lawrence-Stample – (redshirt) junior (6'1, 313)	Linebacker: 5 Reggie Northrup – junior (6'1, 223); 7 Matthew Thomas – sophomore (6'3, 210); 10 E.J. Levenberry – sophomore (6'3, 234); 16 Jacob Pugh – freshman (6'4, 236); 18 Ro'Derrick Hoskins – (redshirt) freshman (6'2, 216); 24 Terrance Smith – (redshirt) junior (6'4, 220); 35 Reginald Dixon Jr. – (redshirt) sophomore (5'10, 200); 39 Mitchell Zak – (redshirt) senior (5'11, 200); 40 Nick Patti – freshman (6'1, 225); 45 Delvin Purifoy – freshman (6'2, 228); 46 Kain Daub – freshman (6'3, 234); 48 Junior St. Louis – senior (6'2, 210); 56 Novisa Petrusich – (redshirt) freshman (6'0, 207); 59 Andrew Wright – (redshirt) senior (6'0, 214); 73 Joseph Hernandez – (redshirt) sophomore (6'0, 202); 91 Anthony Valdes – freshman (6'1, 215); Defensive back: 1 Tyler Hunter – (redshirt) junior (5'11, 197); 3 Ronald Darby – junior (5'11, 192); 6 Nick Waisome – senior (5'10, 176); 8 Jalen Ramsey – sophomore (6'1, 195); 20 Trey Marshall – freshman (5'11, 196); 20 Alfredo Davis – (redshirt) freshman (6'3, 182); 22 Tyrell Lyons – (redshirt) freshman (6'0, 210); 23 Je'Twan Smith – junior (5'11, 168); 26 P. J. Williams – junior (6'0, 193); 27 Marquez White – (redshirt) freshman (6'0, 171); 28 Malique Jackson – freshman (5'11, 170); 29 Nate Andrews – sophomore (5'11, 208); 30 Colin Blake – (redshirt) sophomore (6'3, 214); 31 Tres Copeland – sophomore (5'11, 176); 37 Keelin Smith – Junior (6'3, 185); 37 Osner Valmeus – freshman (5'10, 175); 42 Lamarcus Brutus – (redshirt) junior (6'0, 202); 79 Sean Scott – senior (6'0, 203); Special teams: 19 Roberto Aguayo – (redshirt) sophomore (6'0, 183) (K); 31 Ryan Feely – freshman (6'0, 155) (K); 38 Cason Beatty – junior (6'3, 215) (P) (H); 40 Danny Adams – (redshirt) senior (5'9, 193) (LS); 47 Stephen Gabbard – freshman (6'3, 215) (LS); 49 Jonathan Hernandez – sophomore (6'4, 202) (P); 69 Barrett Kernon – (redshirt) junior (6'4, 247) (LS); 96 Brian Crews – freshman (6'0, 162) (P) (H)

==== Depth chart ====
Defense

FS
Tyler Hunter
Lamarcus Brutus
Tyrell Lyons

WLB	MLB	SLB
Matthew Thomas	Terrance Smith	⋅
Reggie Northrup	E.J. Levenberry	⋅
⋅	⋅	⋅

SS
Jalen Ramsey
Keelin Smith
Trey Marshall

CB
P. J. Williams
Nick Waisome
Colin Blake

DE	DT	DT	DE
Mario Edwards	Nile Lawrence-Stample	Desmond Hollin	Eddie Goldman
Chris Casher	⋅	Justin Shanks	DeMarcus Walker
⋅	⋅	⋅	⋅

CB
Ronald Darby
Nate Andrews
Marquez White

Offense

WR
Rashad Greene
Levonte Whitfield
Christian Greene

LT	LG	C	RG	RT
Roderick Johnson	Josue Matías	Cameron Erving	Tre' Jackson	Bobby Hart
Cameron Erving	Kareem Are	Austin Barron	Ruben Carter	Chad Mavety
⋅	⋅	⋅	⋅	⋅

TE
Nick O'leary
Giorgio Newberry
Kevin Haplea

WR
Jesus Wilson
Travis Rudolph
Ermon Lane

QB
Jameis Winston
Sean Maguire
John Franklin III

RB
Dalvin Cook
Karlos Williams
Mario Pender

FB
Freddie Stevenson
Jonathan Vickers
⋅

Special teams
PK Roberto Aguayo
P Cason Beatty
KR Levonte Whitfield
Mario Pender
Jesus Wilson
Dalvin Cook
PR Levonte Whitfield
Rashad Greene
Jesus Wilson
H Cason Beatty
Jonathan Hernandez

== Media ==
Florida State football is broadcast on the Florida State University Seminoles Radio Network and the games are called by Gene Deckerhoff.

== Statistics ==
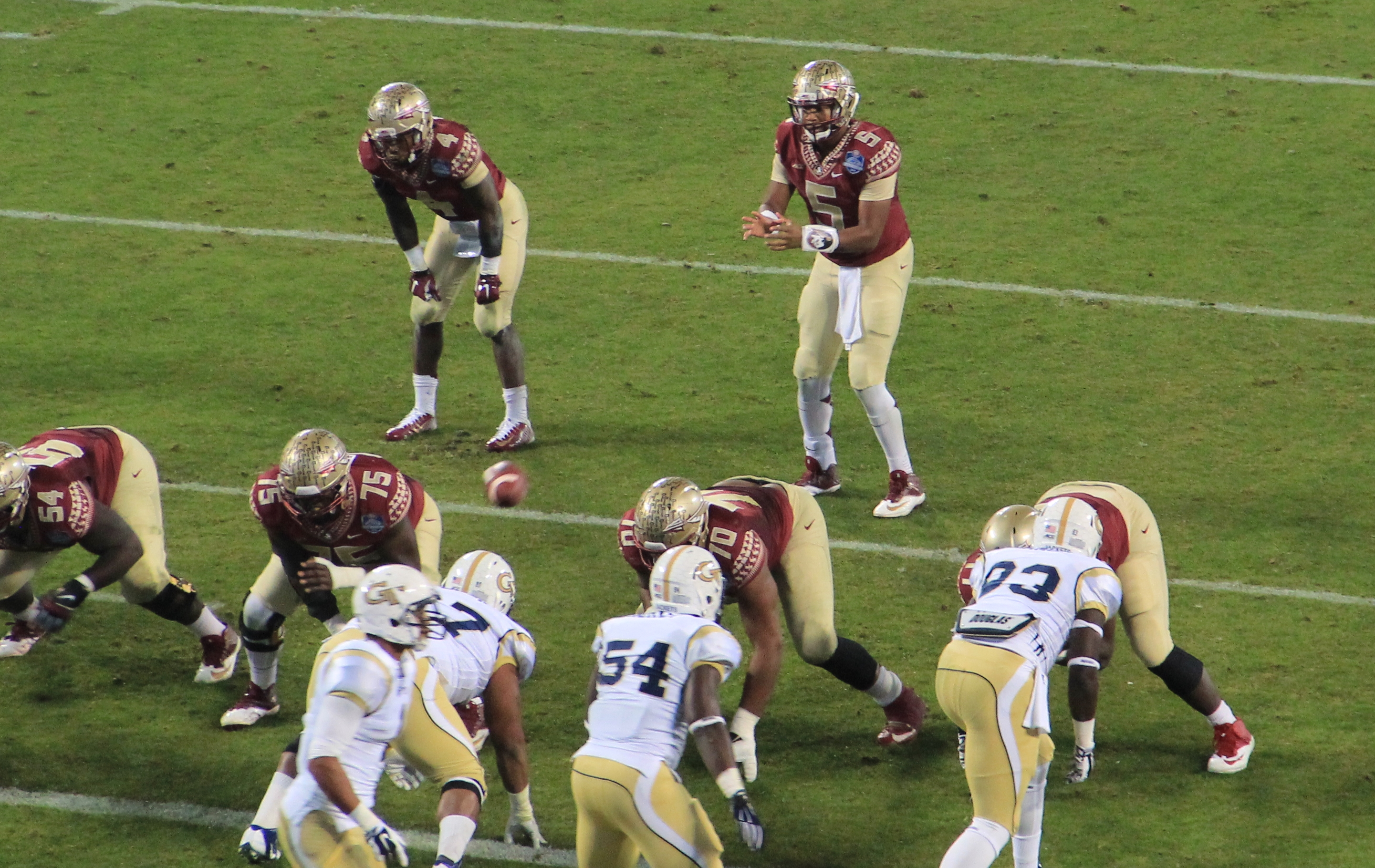
FSU on offense at the 2014 ACC Championship Game

=== Scores by quarter (all opponents) ===
	1	2	3	4	OT	Total
Florida State	82	158	119	107	6	472
All opponents	94	98	90	77	0	359

=== Scores by quarter (ACC opponents) ===
	1	2	3	4	OT	Total
Florida State	41	110	82	84	6	323
ACC opponents	70	61	45	34	0	210

== Rankings ==
Ranking movements Legend: ██ Increase in ranking ██ Decrease in ranking т = Tied with team above or below ( ) = First-place votes
	Week																
Poll	Pre	1	2	3	4	5	6	7	8	9	10	11	12	13	14	15	Final
AP	1 (57)	1 (46)	1 (38)	1 (37)	1 (34)	1 (27)	1 (35)	2 (12)	2 (14)	2 (14)	2 (15)	2 (12)	1 (43)	1 (37)	2 (29)	2 (25)	5 т
Coaches	1 (56)	1 (57)	1 (51)	1 (50)	1 (36)	2 (26)	1 (44)	2 (31)	2 (22)	2 (21)	2 (22)	2 (20)	1 (39)	2 (30)	2 (28)	2 (22)	6
CFP	Not released									2	2	3	3	3	4	3	Not released

== Season ==
In the ACC Media Poll, Florida State was voted to finish first in the Atlantic Division and win the ACC title. Jameis Winston was selected as the Preseason Player of the Year. FSU led the league with nine preseason All-ACC selections in Rashad Greene, Nick O'Leary, Cameron Erving, Tre' Jackson, Jameis Winston, Karlos Williams on offense along with Mario Edwards and P. J. Williams on defense and Roberto Aguayo on special teams.

=== Schedule ===
Date	Time	Opponent	Rank	Site	TV	Result	Attendance
August 30	8:00 p.m.	vs. Oklahoma State*	No. 1	AT&T Stadium; Arlington, TX (Cowboys Classic) (College GameDay)	ABC	W 37–31	61,521
September 6	7:30 p.m.	The Citadel*	No. 1	Doak Campbell Stadium; Tallahassee, FL	ACCRSN	W 37–12	81,294
September 20	8:00 p.m.	No. 22 Clemson	No. 1	Doak Campbell Stadium; Tallahassee, FL (rivalry) (College GameDay)	ABC	W 23–17 ^{OT}	82,316
September 27	3:30 p.m.	at NC State	No. 1	Carter–Finley Stadium; Raleigh, NC	ABC/ESPN2	W 56–41	57,583
October 4	3:30 p.m.	Wake Forest	No. 1	Doak Campbell Stadium; Tallahassee, FL	ABC	W 43–3	82,327
October 11	12:00 p.m.	at Syracuse	No. 1	Carrier Dome; Syracuse, NY	ESPN	W 38–20	43,295
October 18	8:00 p.m.	No. 5 Notre Dame*	No. 2	Doak Campbell Stadium; Tallahassee, Florida (College GameDay) (rivalry)	ABC	W 31–27	82,431
October 30	7:30 p.m.	at No. 25 Louisville	No. 2	Papa John's Cardinal Stadium; Louisville, KY	ESPN	W 42–31	55,414
November 8	6:30 p.m.	Virginia^{†}	No. 2	Doak Campbell Stadium; Tallahassee, FL (Jefferson-Eppes Trophy)	ESPN	W 34–20	82,325
November 15	8:00 p.m.	at Miami (FL)	No. 3	Sun Life Stadium; Miami Gardens, FL (rivalry)	ABC	W 30–26	76,530
November 22	3:30 p.m.	Boston College	No. 3	Doak Campbell Stadium; Tallahassee, FL	ABC/ESPN2	W 20–17	82,300
November 29	3:30 p.m.	Florida*	No. 3	Doak Campbell Stadium; Tallahassee, FL (rivalry)	ESPN	W 24–19	82,485
December 6	8:00 p.m.	vs. No. 11 Georgia Tech	No. 4	Bank of America Stadium; Charlotte, NC (ACC Championship)	ABC	W 37–35	64,808
January 1, 2015	5:00 p.m.	vs. No. 2 Oregon*	No. 3	Rose Bowl; Pasadena, CA (Rose Bowl–CFP Semifinal) (College GameDay)	ESPN	L 20–59	91,322
*Non-conference game; ^{†}Homecoming; Rankings from AP Poll and CFP; All times are in Eastern time

=== Game summaries ===
==== Oklahoma State ====
Florida State vs. Oklahoma State

Quarter	1	2	3	4	Total
#1 Seminoles	10	7	10	10	37
Cowboys	0	10	7	14	31

at AT&T Stadium, Arlington, Texas

- Date: August 30
- Game time: 8:14 p.m. EST
- Game weather: Temperature: 72 °F (22 °C) • Weather: Indoors
- Game attendance: 61,521
- Referee: Land Clark
- TV announcers (ABC): Chris Fowler (play-by-play), Kirk Herbstreit (analyst), Heather Cox (sideline reporter)

Game information

First Quarter

- FSU: Roberto Aguayo 36 yd field goal FSU 3 OSU 0
- FSU: Nate Andrews 9 yd interception return (Roberto Aguayo kick) FSU 10 OSU 0

Second Quarter

- FSU: Mario Pender 11 yd run (Roberto Aguayo kick) FSU 17 OSU 0
- OSU: Desmond Roland 1 yd run (Ben Grogan kick) FSU 17 OSU 7
- OSU: Ben Grogan 37 yd field goal FSU 17 OSU 10

Third Quarter

- FSU: Roberto Aguayo 27 yd field goal FSU 20 OSU 10
- OSU: David Glidden 55 yd pass from J.W. Walsh (Ben Grogan kick) FSU 20 OSU 17
- FSU: Jameis Winston 28 yd run (Roberto Aguayo kick) FSU 27 OSU 17

Fourth Quarter

- OSU: J.W. Walsh 24 yd run (Ben Grogan kick) FSU 27 OSU 24
- FSU: Roberto Aguayo 37 yd field goal FSU 30 OSU 24
- FSU: Rashad Greene 50 yd pass from Jameis Winston (Roberto Aguayo kick) FSU 37 OSU 24
- OSU: J.W. Walsh 3 yd run (Ben Grogan kick) FSU 37 OSU 31

Top Passers

- FSU – Jameis Winston; 25/40, 370 yards, 1 TD, 2 INT
- Oklahoma state – J.W. Walsh; 15/27, 203 yards, 1 TD, 1 INT

Top Rushers

- FSU – Karlos Williams; 23 carries, 66 yards
- Oklahoma state – J.W. Walsh; 11 carries, 51 yards, 2 TD

Top Receiving

- FSU – Rashad Greene; 11 receptions, 203 yards, 1 TD
- Oklahoma state – David Glidden; 2 receptions, 74 yards, 1 TD

==== The Citadel ====
The Citadel vs. Florida State

Quarter	1	2	3	4	Total
Bulldogs	0	0	0	12	12
#1 Seminoles	14	14	6	3	37

at Doak Campbell Stadium, Tallahassee, Florida

- Date: September 6
- Game time: 7:35 p.m. EST
- Game weather: Temperature: 78 °F (26 °C) • Wind: Calm • Weather: Overcast
- Game attendance: 81,294
- Referee: Pat Garvey
- TV announcers (Fox Sports Networks): Wes Durham (play-by-play), James Bates (analyst), Hans Heiserer (sideline reporter)

Game information

First Quarter

- FSU: Karlos Williams 1 yd run (Roberto Aguayo kick) CIT 0 FSU 7
- FSU: Jesus Wilson 12 yd pass from Jameis Winston (Roberto Aguayo kick) CIT 0 FSU 14

Second Quarter

- FSU: Dalvin Cook 5 yd run (Roberto Aguayo kick) CIT 0 FSU 21
- FSU: Nick O'Leary 1 yd pass from Jameis Winston (Roberto Aguayo kick) CIT 0 FSU 28

Third Quarter

- FSU: Roberto Aguayo 22 yd field goal CIT 0 FSU 31
- FSU: Roberto Aguayo 27 yd field goal CIT 0 FSU 34

Fourth Quarter

- CIT: Rudder Brown 10 yd pass from Aaron Miller (Austin Jordan kick failed) CIT 6 FSU 34
- FSU: Roberto Aguayo 24 yd field goal CIT 6 FSU 37
- CIT: DeAndre Schoultz 10 yd pass from Dominique Allen (Alex Glover pass failed) CIT 12 FSU 37

Top Passers

- Citadel – Aaron Miller; 3/11, 46 yards, 1 TD
- FSU – Jameis Winston; 22/27, 256 yards, 2 TD

Top Rushers

- Citadel – Aaron Miller; 14 carries, 61 yards
- FSU – Dalvin Cook; 13 carries, 67 yards, 1 TD

Top Receiving

- Citadel – DeAndre Schoultz; 2 receptions, 26 yards, 1 TD
- FSU – Rashad Greene; 4 receptions, 80 yards

==== Clemson ====
Clemson vs. Florida State

Quarter	1	2	3	4	OT	Total
#22 Tigers	0	10	0	7	0	17
#1 Seminoles	3	0	7	7	6	23

at Doak Campbell Stadium, Tallahassee, Florida

- Date: September 20
- Game time: 8:25 p.m. EST
- Game weather: Temperature: 75 °F (24 °C) • Wind NE 5–10 mph (8.0–16.1 km/h) • Weather: Clear
- Game attendance: 82,316
- Referee: Gary Patterson
- TV announcers (ABC): Chris Fowler (play-by-play), Kirk Herbstreit (analyst), Heather Cox, and Tom Rinaldi (sideline reporters)

Game information

First Quarter

- FSU: Roberto Aguayo 50 yd field goal CLEM 0 FSU 3

Second Quarter

- CLEM: Ammon Lakip 30 yd field goal CLEM 3 FSU 3
- CLEM: D.J. Howard 1 yd run (Ammon Lakip kick) CLEM 10 FSU 3

Third Quarter

- FSU: Mario Pender 1 yd run (Roberto Aguayo kick) CLEM 10 FSU 10

Fourth Quarter

- CLEM: Deshaun Watson 2 yd run (Bradley Pinion kick) CLEM 17 FSU 10
- FSU: Rashad Greene 74 yd pass from Sean Maguire (Roberto Aguayo kick) CLEM 17 FSU 17

Overtime

- FSU: Karlos Williams 12 yd run CLEM 17 FSU 23

Top Passers

- Clemson – Deshaun Watson; 19/28, 266 yards
- FSU – Sean Maguire; 21/39, 304 yards, 1 TD, 2 INT

Top Rushers

- Clemson – C.J. Davidson; 12 carries, 54 yards
- FSU – Karlos Williams; 10 carries, 45 yards, 1 TD

Top Receiving

- Clemson – Mike Williams; 2 receptions, 72 yards
- FSU – Rashad Greene; 9 receptions, 135 yards, 1 TD

==== NC State ====
Florida State vs. NC State

Quarter	1	2	3	4	Total
#1 Seminoles	7	14	21	14	56
Wolfpack	24	0	14	3	41

at Carter Finley Stadium, Raleigh, North Carolina

- Date: September 27
- Game time: 3:36 p.m. EST
- Game weather: Temperature: 76 °F (24 °C) • Wind ENE 8 mph (13 km/h) • Weather: Mostly Cloudy
- Game attendance: 57,583
- Referee: David Epperley
- TV announcers (ABC/ESPN2): Sean McDonough (play-by-play), Chris Spielman (analyst), Todd McShay (sideline reporter)

Game information

First Quarter

- NCST: Bo Hines 54 yd pass from Jacoby Brissett (Niklas Sade kick) FSU 0 NCST 7
- FSU: Jesus Wilson 32 yd pass from Jameis Winston (Roberto Aguayo kick) FSU 7 NCST 7
- NCST: Shadrach Thornton 3 yd run (Niklas Sade kick) FSU 7 NCST 14
- NCST: Niklas Sade 37 yd field goal FSU 7 NCST 17
- NCST: Johnathan Alston 8 yd pass from Jacoby Brissett (Niklas Sade kick) FSU 7 NCST 24

Second Quarter

- FSU: Karlos Williams 4 yd run (Roberto Aguayo kick) FSU 14 NCST 24
- FSU: Christian Green 22 yd pass from Jameis Winston (Roberto Aguayo kick) FSU 21 NCST 24

Third Quarter

- NCST: Matt Dayes 10 yd pass from Jacoby Brissett (Niklas Sade kick) FSU 21 NCST 31
- FSU: Dalvin Cook 19 yd run (Roberto Aguayo kick) FSU 28 NCST 31
- NCST: Shadrach Thornton 10 yd run (Niklas Sade kick) FSU 28 NCST 38
- FSU: Jesus Wilson 15 yd pass from Jameis Winston (Roberto Aguayo kick) FSU 35 NCST 38
- FSU: Rashad Greene 4 yd pass from Jameis Winston (Roberto Aguayo kick) FSU 42 NCST 38

Fourth Quarter

- FSU: Karlos Williams 1 yd run (Roberto Aguayo kick) FSU 49 NCST 38
- NCST: Niklas Sade 25 yd field goal FSU 49 NCST 41
- FSU: Karlos Williams 12 yd run (Roberto Aguayo kick) FSU 56 NCST 41

Top Passers

- FSU – Jameis Winston; 26/38, 365 yards, 4 TD, 2 INT
- NC state – Jacoby Brissett; 32/48, 359 yards, 3 TD

Top Rushers

- FSU – Karlos Williams; 21 carries, 126 yards, 3 TD
- NC state – Shadrach Thornton; 18 carries, 85 yards, 2 TD

Top Receiving

- FSU – Rashad Greene; 11 receptions, 125 yards, 1 TD
- NC state – Bo Hines; 8 receptions, 103 yards, 1 TD

==== Wake Forest ====
Wake Forest vs. Florida State

Quarter	1	2	3	4	Total
Demon Deacons	3	0	0	0	3
#1 Seminoles	0	13	17	13	43

at Doak Campbell Stadium, Tallahassee, Florida

- Date: October 4
- Game time: 3:35 p.m. EST
- Game weather: Temperature: 77 °F (25 °C) • Wind NW 13 mph (21 km/h) • Weather: Clear
- Game attendance: 82,327
- Referee: Jeff Flanagan
- TV announcers (ABC/ESPN3): Mike Patrick (play-by-play), Ed Cunningham (analyst), Jeannine Edwards (sideline reporter)

Game information

First Quarter

- WF: Mike Weaver 36 yd field goal WF 3 FSU 0

Second Quarter

- FSU: Roberto Aguayo 43 yd field goal WF 3 FSU 3
- FSU: Jameis Winston 2 yd run (Roberto Aguayo kick) WF 3 FSU 10
- FSU: Roberto Aguayo 40 yd field goal WF 3 FSU 13

Third Quarter

- FSU: Roberto Aguayo 52 yd field goal WF 3 FSU 16
- FSU: Mario Pender 3 yd run (Roberto Aguayo kick) WF 3 FSU 23
- FSU: Reggie Northrup 31 yd fumble return (Roberto Aguayo kick) WF 3 FSU 30

Fourth Quarter

- FSU: Roberto Aguayo 42 yd field goal WF 3 FSU 33
- FSU: Travis Rudolph 59 yd pass from Jameis Winston (Roberto Aguayo kick) WF 3 FSU 40
- FSU: Roberto Aguayo 32 yd field goal WF 3 FSU 43

Top Passers

- Wake forest – John Wolford; 9/15, 58 yards, 1 INT
- FSU – Jameis Winston; 23/39, 297 yards, 1 TD, 1 INT

Top Rushers

- Wake forest – Dezmond Wortham; 12 carries, 68 yards
- FSU – Mario Pender; 5 carries, 70 yards, 1 TD

Top Receiving

- Wake forest – E.J. Scott; 4 receptions, 28 yards
- FSU – Ermon Lane; 2 receptions, 70 yards

==== Syracuse ====
Florida State vs. Syracuse

Quarter	1	2	3	4	Total
#1 Seminoles	10	14	7	7	38
Orange	0	6	7	7	20

at Carrier Dome, Syracuse, New York

- Date: October 11
- Game time: 12:01 p.m. EST
- Game weather: Temperature: 66 °F (19 °C) • Weather: Indoors
- Game attendance: 43,295
- Referee: Tom McCreesh
- TV announcers (ESPN): Bob Wischusen (play-by-play), Matt Millen (analyst), Quint Kessenich (sideline reporter)

Game information

First Quarter

- FSU: Mario Pender 12 yd run (Roberto Aguayo kick) FSU 7 SYR 0
- FSU: Roberto Aguayo 34 yd field goal FSU 10 SYRA 0

Second Quarter

- SYR: Cole Murphy 21 yd field goal FSU 10 SYR 3
- FSU: Mario Pender 4 yd pass from Jameis Winston (Roberto Aguayo kick) FSU 17 SYR 3
- SYR: Cole Murphy 32 yd field goal FSU 17 SYR 6
- FSU: Nick O'Leary 21 yd pass from Jameis Winston (Roberto Aguayo kick) FSU 24 SYR 6

Third Quarter

- FSU: Jesus Wilson 7 yd pass from Jameis Winston (Roberto Aguayo kick) FSU 31 SYR 6
- SYR: Steve Ishmael 22 yd pass from A.J. Long (Cole Murphy kick) FSU 31 SYR 13

Fourth Quarter

- FSU: Dalvin Cook 7 yd run (Roberto Aguayo kick) FSU 38 SYR 13
- SYR: Steve Ishmael 35 yd pass from A.J. Long (Cole Murphy kick) FSU 38 SYR 20

Top Passers

- FSU – Jameis Winston; 30/36, 317 yards, 3 TD
- Syracuse – A.J. Long; 16/27, 167 yards, 2 TD, 2 INT

Top Rushers

- FSU – Dalvin Cook; 23 carries, 122 yards, 1 TD
- Syracuse – Prince-Tyson Gulley; 16 carries, 80 yards

Top Receiving

- FSU – Rashad Greene; 6 receptions, 107 yards
- Syracuse – Steve Ishmael; 3 receptions, 93 yards, 2TD

==== Notre Dame ====
Notre Dame vs. Florida State

Quarter	1	2	3	4	Total
#5 Fighting Irish	7	10	7	3	27
#2 Seminoles	7	3	14	7	31

at Doak Campbell Stadium, Tallahassee, Florida

- Date: October 18
- Game time: 8:24 p.m. EST
- Game weather: Temperature: 72 °F (22 °C) • Wind WNW 3 mph (4.8 km/h) • Weather: Clear
- Game attendance: 82,431
- Referee: David Epperley
- TV announcers (ABC): Chris Fowler (play-by-play), Kirk Herbstreit (analyst), Heather Cox, and Tom Rinaldi (sideline reporters)

Game information

First Quarter

- ND: Corey Robinson 1 yd pass from Everett Golson (Kyle Brindza kick) ND 7 FSU 0
- FSU: Travis Rudolph 11 yd pass from Jameis Winston (Roberto Aguayo kick) ND 7 FSU 7

Second Quarter

- ND: Corey Robinson 9 yd pass from Everett Golson (Kyle Brindza kick) ND 14 FSU 7
- FSU: Roberto Aguayo 28 Yd Field Goal ND 14 FSU 10
- ND: Kyle Brindza 34 yd field goal ND 17 FSU 10

Third Quarter

- FSU: Rashad Greene 10 yd pass from Jameis Winston (Roberto Aguayo kick) ND 17 FSU 17
- ND: William Fuller 11 yd pass from Everett Golson (Kyle Brindza kick) ND 24 FSU 17
- FSU: Karlos Williams 2 yd run (Roberto Aguayo kick) ND 24 FSU 24

Fourth Quarter

- ND: Kyle Brindza 46 yd field goal ND 27 FSU 24
- FSU: Karlos Williams 1 yd run (Roberto Aguayo kick) ND 27 FSU 31

Top Passers

- Notre dame – Everett Golson; 31/52, 313 yards, 3 TD, 2 INT
- FSU – Jameis Winston; 23/31, 273 yards, 2 TD, 1 INT

Top Rushers

- Notre dame – Tarean Folston; 21 carries, 120 yards
- FSU – Karlos Williams; 8 carries, 25 yards, 2 TD

Top Receiving

- Notre dame – Corey Robinson; 8 receptions, 99 yards, 2 TD
- FSU – Rashad Greene; 8 receptions, 108 yards, 1 TD

==== Louisville ====
Florida State vs. Louisville

Quarter	1	2	3	4	Total
#2 Seminoles	0	7	14	21	42
Cardinals	0	21	3	7	31

at Papa John's Cardinal Stadium, Louisville, Kentucky

- Date: October 30
- Game time: 7:32 p.m. EST
- Game weather: Temperature: 51 °F (11 °C) • Wind ENE 6 mph (9.7 km/h) • Weather: Partly Cloudy
- Game attendance: 55,414
- Referee: Dennis Hennigan
- TV announcers (ESPN): Rece Davis (play-by-play), Jesse Palmer and David Pollack (analysts), Samantha Ponder (sideline reporter)

Game information

Second Quarter

- LOU: Michael Dyer 4 yd run (John Wallace kick) FSU 0 LOU 7
- LOU: Michael Dyer 12 yd run (John Wallace kick) FSU 0 LOU 14
- LOU: Gerald Christian 11 yd pass from Will Gardner (John Wallace kick) FSU 0 LOU 21
- FSU: Nick O'Leary fumble recovery (Roberto Aguayo kick) FSU 7 LOU 21

Third Quarter

- LOU: John Wallace 33 yd field goal FSU 7 LOU 24
- FSU: Travis Rudolph 68 yd pass from Jameis Winston (Roberto Aguayo kick) FSU 14 LOU 24
- FSU: Dalvin Cook 40 yd run (Roberto Aguayo kick) FSU 21 LOU 24

Fourth Quarter

- FSU: Ermon Lane 47 yd pass from Jameis Winston (Roberto Aguayo kick) FSU 28 LOU 24
- LOU: Michael Dyer 1 yd run (John Wallace kick) FSU 28 LOU 31
- FSU: Dalvin Cook 38 yd run (Roberto Aguayo kick) FSU 35 LOU 31
- FSU: Freddie Stevenson 35 yd pass from Jameis Winston (Roberto Aguayo kick) FSU 42 LOU 31

Top Passers

- FSU – Jameis Winston; 25/48, 401 yards, 3 TD, 3 INT
- Louisville – Will Gardner; 20/38, 330 yards, 1 TD, 1 INT

Top Rushers

- FSU – Dalvin Cook; 9 carries, 110 yards, 2 TD
- Louisville – Michael Dyer; 28 carries, 134 yards, 3 TD

Top Receiving

- FSU – Nick O'Leary; 6 receptions, 76 yards
- Louisville – DeVante Parker; 8 receptions, 214 yards

==== Virginia ====
Virginia vs. Florida State

Quarter	1	2	3	4	Total
Cavaliers	13	0	7	0	20
#2 Seminoles	7	21	6	0	34

at Doak Campbell Stadium, Tallahassee, Florida

- Date: November 8
- Game time: 6:41 p.m. EST
- Game weather: Temperature: 60 °F (16 °C) • Wind: Calm • Weather: Partly Cloudy
- Game attendance: 82,325
- Referee: Jerry Magallane
- TV announcers (ESPN): Joe Tessitore (play-by-play), Brock Huard (analyst), Shannon Spake (sideline reporter)

Game information

First Quarter

- FSU: Karlos Williams 2 yd run (Roberto Aguayo kick) FSU 7 UVA 0
- UVA: Andre Levrone 16 yd pass from Greyson Lambert (Ian Frye kick) FSU 7 UVA 7
- UVA: Darius Jennings 15 yd pass from Greyson Lambert (Ian Frye PAT failed) FSU 7 UVA 13

Second Quarter

- FSU: Karlos Williams 3 yd run (Roberto Aguayo kick) FSU 14 UVA 13
- FSU: Rashad Greene 22 yd pass from Jameis Winston (Roberto Aguayo kick) FSU 21 UVA 13
- FSU: Jameis Winston 4 yd run (Roberto Aguayo kick) FSU 28 UVA 13

Third Quarter

- UVA: Canaan Severin 23 yd pass from Greyson Lambert (Ian Frye kick) FSU 28 UVA 20
- FSU: Roberto Aguayo 43 yd field goal FSU 31 UVA 20
- FSU: Roberto Aguayo 40 yd field goal FSU 34 UVA 20

Top Passers

- Virginia – Greyson Lambert; 20/35, 220 yards, 3 TD, 1 INT
- FSU – Jameis Winston; 22/35, 261 yards, 1 TD, 2 INT

Top Rushers

- Virginia – Kevin Parks; 15 carries, 43 yards
- FSU – Karlos Williams; 21 carries, 70 yards, 2 TD

Top Receiving

- Virginia – Canaan Severin; 4 receptions, 56 yards, 1 TD
- FSU – Rashad Greene; 12 receptions, 136 yards, 1 TD

==== Miami (FL) ====
Florida State vs. Miami (FL)

Quarter	1	2	3	4	Total
#2 Seminoles	0	10	7	13	30
Hurricanes	13	10	0	3	26

at Sun Life Stadium, Miami Gardens, Florida

- Date: November 15
- Game time: 8:15 p.m. EST
- Game weather: Temperature: 75 °F (24 °C) • Wind: Calm • Weather: Clear
- Game attendance: 76,530
- Referee: Ron Cherry
- TV announcers (ABC): Chris Fowler (play-by-play), Kirk Herbstreit (analyst), and Heather Cox (sideline reporter)/Bill Rosinski, David Norrie, and Joe Schad (ESPN Radio)

Game information

First Quarter

- MIA: Phillip Dorsett 27 yd pass from Brad Kaaya (Michael Badgley kick) FSU 0 MIA 7
- MIA: Duke Johnson 1 yd run (Michael Badgley PAT blocked) FSU 0 MIA 13

Second Quarter

- MIA: Michael Badgley 45 yd field goal FSU 0 MIA 16
- FSU: Dalvin Cook 44 yd run (Roberto Aguayo kick) FSU 7 MIA 16
- MIA: Clive Walford 61 yd pass from Brad Kaaya (Michael Badgley kick) FSU 7 MIA 23
- FSU: Roberto Aguayo 43 yd field goal FSU 10 MIA 23

Third Quarter

- FSU: Karlos Williams 11 yd pass from Jameis Winston (Roberto Aguayo kick) FSU 17 MIA 23

Fourth Quarter

- FSU: Roberto Aguayo 37 yd field goal FSU 20 MIA 23
- MIA: Michael Badgley 46 yd field goal FSU 20 MIA 26
- FSU: Roberto Aguayo 53 yd field goal FSU 23 MIA 26
- FSU: Dalvin Cook 26 yd run (Roberto Aguayo kick) FSU 30 MIA 26

Top Passers

- FSU – Jameis Winston; 25/42, 304 yards, 1 TD, 1 INT
- Miami – Brad Kaaya; 16/34, 316 yards, 2 TD, 1 INT

Top Rushers

- FSU – Dalvin Cook; 7 carries, 92 yards, 2 TD
- Miami – Duke Johnson; 27 carries, 130 yards, 2 TD, 1 INT

Top Receiving

- FSU – Travis Rudolph; 4 receptions, 65 yards
- Miami – Clive Walford; 4 receptions, 127 yards, 1 TD

==== Boston College ====
Boston College vs. Florida State

Quarter	1	2	3	4	Total
Eagles	3	7	7	0	17
#1 Seminoles	7	10	0	3	20

at Doak Campbell Stadium, Tallahassee, Florida

- Date: November 22
- Game time: 3:33 p.m. EST
- Game weather: Temperature: 63 °F (17 °C) • Wind ENE 8 mph (13 km/h) • Weather: Intermittent Rain
- Game attendance: 82,300
- Referee: Jeff Heaser
- TV announcers (ABC/ESPN2): Mike Patrick (play-by-play), Ed Cunningham (analyst), Jeannine Edwards (sideline reporter)

Game information

First Quarter

- FSU: Karlos Williams 3 yd run (Roberto Aguayo kick) BC 0 FSU 7
- BC: Mike Knoll 40 yd field goal BC 3 FSU 7

Second Quarter

- FSU: Roberto Aguayo 37 yd field goal BC 3 FSU 10
- BC: Shakim Phillips 49 yd pass from Tyler Murphy (Mike Knoll kick) BC 10 FSU 10
- FSU: Nick O'Leary 30 yd pass from Jameis Winston (Roberto Aguayo kick) BC 10 FSU 17

Third Quarter

- BC: Tyler Murphy 21 yd run (Mike Knoll kick) BC 17 FSU 17

Fourth Quarter

- FSU: Roberto Aguayo 26 yd field goal BC 17 FSU 20

Top Passers

- Boston college – Tyler Murphy; 6/10, 73 yards, 1 TD
- FSU – Jameis Winston; 22/32, 281 yards, 1 TD, 1 INT

Top Rushers

- Boston college – Jon Hilliman; 13 carries, 73 yards,
- FSU – Dalvin Cook; 14 carries, 76 yards

Top Receiving

- Boston college – Shakim Phillips; 1 reception, 49 yards, 1 TD
- FSU – Rashad Greene; 8 receptions, 106 yards

==== Florida ====
Florida vs. Florida State

Quarter	1	2	3	4	Total
Gators	9	7	3	0	19
#1 Seminoles	7	14	0	3	24

at Doak Campbell Stadium, Tallahassee, Florida

- Date: November 29
- Game time: 3:40 p.m. EST
- Game weather: Temperature: 67 °F (19 °C) • Wind NE 5 mph (8.0 km/h) • Weather: Clear
- Game attendance: 82,485
- Referee: Jeff Flanagan
- TV announcers (ESPN): Chris Fowler (play-by-play), Kirk Herbstreit (analyst), Heather Cox (sideline reporter)

Game information

First Quarter

- UF: Austin Hardin 52 yd field goal UF 3 FSU 0
- UF: Austin Hardin 39 yd field goal UF 6 FSU 0
- UF: Austin Hardin 43 yd field goal UF 9 FSU 0
- FSU: Terrance Smith 94 yd interception return (Roberto Aguayo kick) UF 9 FSU 7

Second Quarter

- FSU: Nick O'Leary 10 yd pass from Jameis Winston (Roberto Aguayo kick) UF 9 FSU 14
- FSU: Nick O'Leary 6 yd pass from Jameis Winston (Roberto Aguayo kick) UF 9 FSU 21
- UF: Clay Burton 15 yd pass from Treon Harris (Austin Hardin kick) UF 16 FSU 21

Third Quarter

- UF: Austin Hardin 32 yd field goal UF 19 FSU 21

Fourth Quarter

- FSU: Roberto Aguayo 37 yd field goal UF 19 FSU 24

Top Passers

- Florida – Treon Harris; 13/32, 169 yards, 1 TD, 2 INT
- FSU – Jameis Winston; 12/24, 125 yards, 2 TD, 4 INT

Top Rushers

- Florida – Treon Harris; 9 carries, 41 yards
- FSU – Dalvin Cook; 24 carries, 144 yards

Top Receiving

- Florida – Demarcus Robinson; 4 receptions, 71 yards
- FSU – Nick O'Leary; 4 receptions, 52 yards, 2 TD

==== ACC Championship: Georgia Tech ====
Florida State vs. Georgia Tech (ACC Championship)

Quarter	1	2	3	4	Total
#2 Seminoles	7	21	3	6	37
#12 Yellow Jackets	14	7	7	7	35

at Bank of America Stadium, Charlotte, North Carolina

- Date: December 6
- Game time: 8:14 p.m. EST
- Game weather: Temperature: 52 °F (11 °C) • Wind W 5 mph (8.0 km/h) • Weather: Foggy
- Game attendance: 64,808
- Referee: Gary Patterson
- TV announcers (ABC): Chris Fowler (play-by-play), Kirk Herbstreit (analyst), Heather Cox (sideline reporter)

Game information

First Quarter

- GT: Synjyn Days 1 yd run (Harrison Butker kick) FSU 0 GT 7
- FSU: Nick O'Leary 46 yd pass from Jameis Winston (Roberto Aguayo kick) FSU 7 GT 7
- GT: Synjyn Days 1 yd run (Harrison Butker kick) FSU 7 GT 14

Second Quarter

- FSU: Dalvin Cook 1 yd run (Roberto Aguayo kick) FSU 14 GT 14
- GT: Zach Laskey 4 yd run (Harrison Butker kick) FSU 14 GT 21
- FSU: Rashad Greene 44 yd pass from Jameis Winston (Roberto Aguayo kick) FSU 21 GT 21
- FSU: Rashad Greene 9 yd pass from Jameis Winston (Roberto Aguayo kick) FSU 28 GT 21

Third Quarter

- GT: Synjyn Days 1 yd run (Harrison Butker kick) FSU 28 GT 28
- FSU: Roberto Aguayo 33 yd field goal FSU 31 GT 28

Fourth Quarter

- FSU: Roberto Aguayo 32 yd field goal FSU 34 GT 28
- FSU: Roberto Aguayo 28 yd field goal FSU 37 GT 28
- GT: Darren Waller 25 yd pass from Justin Thomas (Harrison Butker kick) FSU 37 GT 35

Top Passers

- FSU – Jameis Winston; 21/30, 309 yards, 3 TD
- Georgia tech – Justin Thomas; 8/14, 134 yards, 1 TD, 1 INT

Top Rushers

- FSU – Dalvin Cook; 31 carries, 177 yards, 3 TD
- Georgia tech – Justin Thomas; 11 carries, 104 yards

Top Receiving

- FSU – Rashad Greene; 7 receptions, 123 yards, 2 TD
- Georgia tech – Darren Waller; 5 receptions, 73 yards, 1 TD

==== Rose Bowl: Oregon ====
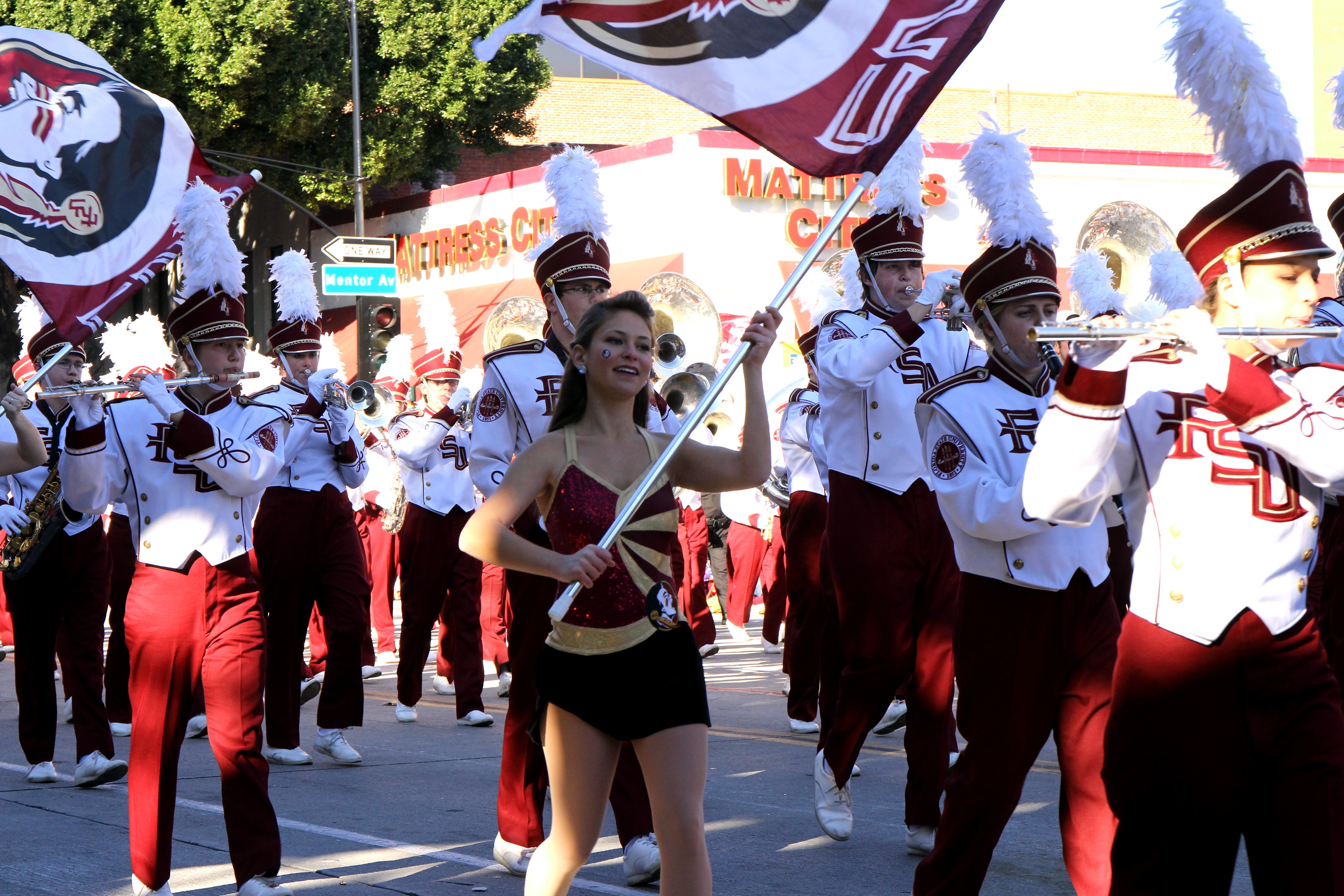
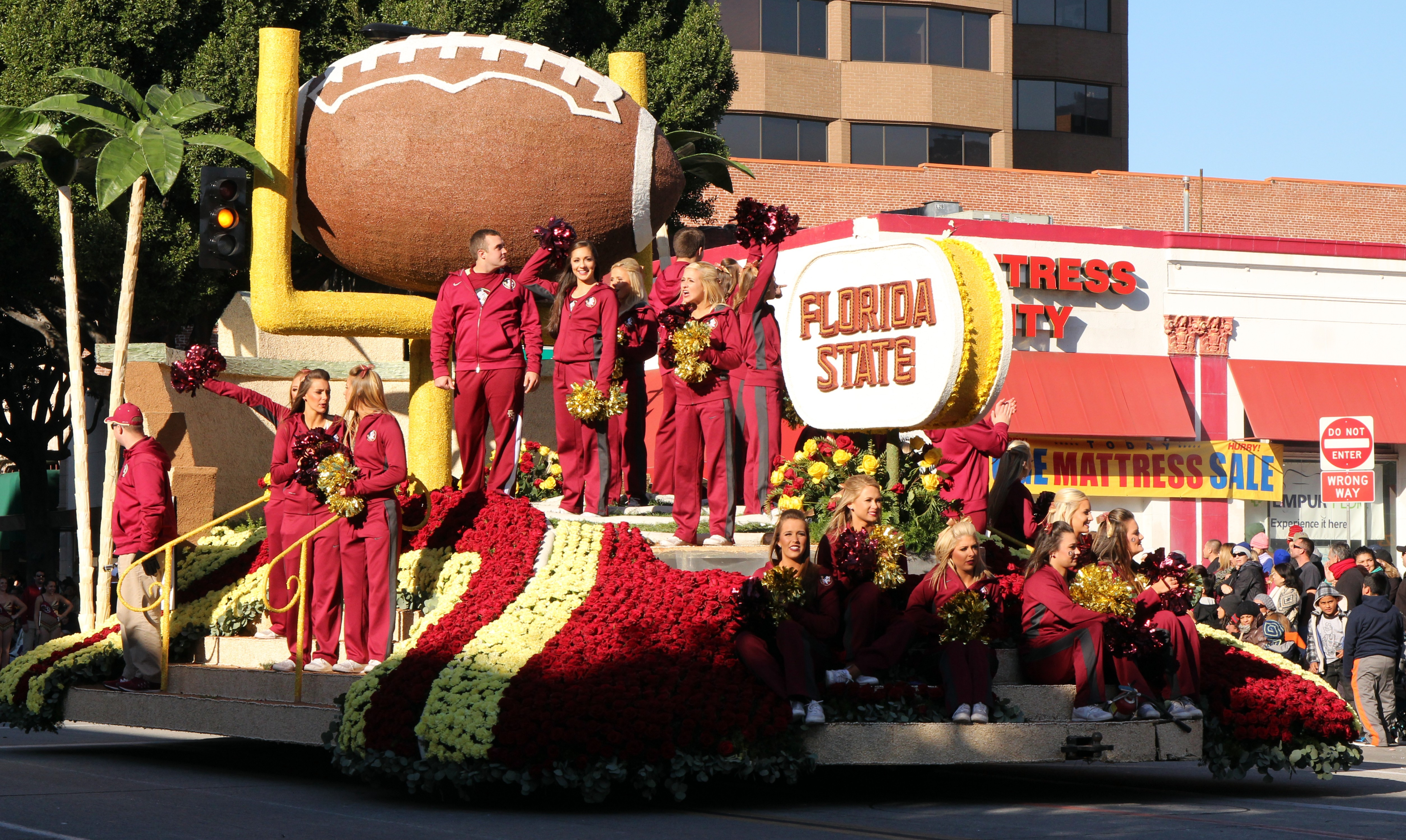
Marching Chiefs and FSU cheerleaders in the Rose Parade, as part of the Rose Bowl
Florida State vs. Oregon (Rose Bowl)

Quarter	1	2	3	4	Total
#2 Seminoles	3	10	7	0	20
#3 Ducks	8	10	27	14	59

at Rose Bowl, Pasadena, California

- Date: January 1
- Game time: 5:12 p.m. EST
- Game weather: Temperature: 57 °F (14 °C) • Wind: Calm • Weather: Sunny
- Game attendance: 91,322
- Referee: Matt Austin
- TV announcers (ESPN/ESPN Radio): Chris Fowler, Kirk Herbstreit, Heather Cox, Tom Rinaldi/Sean McDonough, Chris Spielman, Todd McShay

Game information

First Quarter

- FSU: Roberto Aguayo 28 yd field goal UO 0 FSU 3
- UO: Royce Freeman 1 yd run (Taylor Alie pass to Christian French for two-point conversion) UO 8 FSU 3

Second Quarter

- UO: Aidan Schneider 28 yd field goal UO 11 FSU 3
- FSU: Roberto Aguayo 26 yd field goal UO 11 FSU 6
- UO: Thomas Tyner 1 yd run (Aidan Schneider kick) UO 18 FSU 6
- FSU: Karlos Williams 10 yd run (Roberto Aguayo kick) UO 18 FSU 13

Third Quarter

- UO: Royce Freeman 3 yd run (Aidan Schneider kick) UO 25 FSU 13
- FSU: Travis Rudolph 18 yd pass from Jameis Winston (Roberto Aguayo kick) UO 25 FSU 20
- UO: Darren Carrington 56 yd pass from Marcus Mariota (Aidan Schneider kick) UO 32 FSU 20
- UO: Darren Carrington 30 yd pass from Marcus Mariota (Aidan Schneider kick) UO 39 FSU 20
- UO: Tony Washington 58 yd fumble return (Aidan Schneider PAT blocked) UO 45 FSU 20

Fourth Quarter

- UO: Marcus Mariota 23 yd run (Aidan Schneider kick) UO 52 FSU 20
- UO: Thomas Tyner 21 yd run (Aidan Schneider kick) UO 59 FSU 20

Top Passers

- FSU – Jameis Winston; 29/45, 348 yards, 1 TD, 1 INT
- Oregon – Marcus Mariota; 26/36, 338 yards, 2 TD, 1 INT

Top Rushers

- FSU – Dalvin Cook; 15 carries, 103 yards, 2 FUM
- Oregon – Thomas Tyner; 13 carries, 124 yards, 2 TD

Top Receiving

- FSU – Travis Rudolph; 6 receptions, 96 yards, 1 TD
- Oregon – Darren Carrington; 7 receptions, 165 yards, 2 TD

== Awards ==
- John Mackey Award

Nick O'Leary

- Career Achievement Award

Rashad Greene

- Vlade Janakievski Award

Roberto Aguayo

=== All-Americans ===
Nick O'Leary, Tre' Jackson and Roberto Aguayo were chosen as consensus All-American players.

- Nick O'Leary
- Cameron Erving
- Tre' Jackson
- Roberto Aguayo
- Josue Matias
- Ronald Darby
- Jalen Ramsey
- P. J. Williams
- Rashad Greene
- Eddie Goldman
- Mario Edwards Jr.
- Jameis Winston
- Roderick Johnson
- Dalvin Cook

=== Conference ===
- Jacobs Blocking Trophy

Cameron Erving

==== All-ACC ====
ACSMA

- Offense
  - First Team
    - Rashad Greene
    - Nick O'Leary
    - Cameron Erving
    - Tre' Jackson
    - Jameis Winston
    - Roberto Aguayo
  - Second Team
    - Josue Matias
    - Dalvin Cook
  - Third Team
    - Bobby Hart
- Defense
  - First Team
    - Mario Edwards Jr.
    - Eddie Goldman
    - P. J. Williams
    - Jalen Ramsey
  - Second Team
    - Terrance Smith
  - Third Team
    - Reggie Northrup
    - Ronald Darby

Coaches

- Offense
  - First Team
    - Rashad Greene
    - Nick O"Leary
    - Tre' Jackson
    - Jameis Winston
    - Roberto Aguayo
  - Third Team
    - Bobby Hart
    - Josue Matias
    - Cameron Erving
    - Dalvin Cook
  - Honorable Mention
    - Karlos Williams
- Defense
  - First Team
    - Mario Edwards Jr.
    - Eddie Goldman
    - Jalen Ramsey
  - Second Team
    - Terrance Smith
    - P. J. Williams
  - Third Team
    - Reggie Northrup
    - Ronald Darby

=== Honors ===
Week One

- ACC Players of the Week
  - Wide receiver
    - Rashad Greene
  - Defensive lineman
    - Mario Edwards Jr.
- Lou Groza Star of the Week
  - Roberto Aguayo
- College Football Performance Awards
  - Specialist of the Week: Roberto Aguayo (Honorable Mention)
  - Receiver of the Week: Rashad Greene (Honorable Mention)
  - Defensive Back of the Week: Nate Andrews (Honorable Mention)

Week Four

- ACC Players of the Week
  - Wide receiver
    - Rashad Greene
  - Defensive lineman
    - Eddie Goldman

Week Five

- ACC Players of the Week
  - Wide receiver
    - Rashad Greene
  - Offensive lineman
    - Tre' Jackson

Week Six

- ACC Players of the Week
  - Linebacker
    - Reggie Northrup
  - Specialist
    - Roberto Aguayo
- Lou Groza Star of the Week
  - Roberto Aguayo
- College Football Performance Awards
  - Specialist of the Week: Roberto Aguayo
  - Linebacker of the Week: Reggie Northrup

Week Seven

- ACC Players of the Week
  - Offensive lineman
    - Tre' Jackson
- John Mackey National Tight End of the Week
  - Nick O'Leary

Week Eight

- ACC Players of the Week
  - Offensive lineman
    - Tre' Jackson
  - Linebacker
    - Terrance Smith
- Bednarik National Defensive Player of the Week
  - Terrance Smith

Week Ten

- ACC Players of the Week
  - Offensive back
    - Jameis Winston
  - Offensive lineman
    - Cameron Erving
  - Linebacker
    - Reggie Northrup
  - Rookie
    - Dalvin Cook
- Athlon Sports Freshman of the Week
  - Dalvin Cook

Week Eleven

- ACC Players of the Week
  - Wide receiver
    - Rashad Greene
  - Defensive lineman
    - Mario Edwards Jr.
- Lou Groza Star of the Week
  - Roberto Aguayo

Week Twelve

- ACC Players of the Week
  - Offensive lineman
    - Cameron Erving
  - Defensive back
    - Jalen Ramsey
  - Specialist
    - Roberto Aguayo
  - Rookie
    - Dalvin Cook
- Athlon Sports Defensive Player of the Week
  - Jalen Ramsey
- Bednarik National Defensive Player of the Week
  - Jalen Ramsey

Week Thirteen

- ACC Players of the Week
  - Specialist
    - Roberto Aguayo

Week Fourteen

- ACC Players of the Week
  - Linebacker
    - Terrance Smith

=== Watchlists ===
- Lott Trophy

Ronald Darby

- Rimington Trophy

Austin Barron

- Paul Hornung Award

Levonte Whitfield

- Maxwell Award

Rashad Greene
Karlos Williams
Jameis Winston

- Bednarik Award

Mario Edwards Jr.
P. J. Williams

- John Mackey Award

Nick O'Leary

- Lou Groza Award

Roberto Aguayo

- Nagurski Trophy

Mario Edwards Jr.
P. J. Williams

- Outland Trophy

Cameron Erving
Tre' Jackson
Josue Matías

- Jim Thorpe Award

Jalen Ramsey
P. J. Williams

- Lombardi Award

Mario Edwards Jr.
Cameron Erving
Tre' Jackson
Josue Matías

- Butkus Award

Terrance Smith

- Biletnikoff Award

Rashad Greene

- Davey O'Brien Award

Jameis Winston

- Walter Camp Award

Cameron Erving
Jameis Winston

- Manning Award

Jameis Winston

==== Quarterfinalists ====
- John Mackey Award

Nick O'Leary

- Lott Trophy

Ronald Darby

==== Semifinalists ====
- Jim Thorpe Award

P. J. Williams

- Maxwell Award

Jameis Winston

- Davey O'Brien Award

Jameis Winston

- Lou Groza Award

Roberto Aguayo

- Biletnikoff Award

Rashad Greene

- John Mackey Award

Nick O'Leary

- Walter Camp Award

Jameis Winston

- Outland Trophy

Tre' Jackson

- Maxwell Coach of the Year Award

Jimbo Fisher

==== Finalists ====
- Lou Groza Award

Roberto Aguayo

- John Mackey Award

Nick O'Leary

- Manning Award

Jameis Winston

- Eddie Robinson Coach of the Year

Jimbo Fisher

- Dodd Trophy

Jimbo Fisher

- Bear Bryant Award

Jimbo Fisher

=== All-star games ===
Game	Date	Site	Players
66th Senior Bowl	January 24, 2015	Ladd–Peebles Stadium, Mobile, Alabama	Tre' Jackson

Game	Date	Site	Players
90th East–West Shrine Game	January 17, 2015	Tropicana Field, St. Petersburg, Florida	Bobby Hart

=== NFL draft ===
The following FSU players were selected in the 2015 NFL draft:

Round	Pick	Overall	Name	Position	Team
1st	1	1	Jameis Winston	Quarterback	Tampa Bay Buccaneers
1st	19	19	Cameron Erving	Center	Cleveland Browns
2nd	3	35	Mario Edwards Jr.	Defensive end	Oakland Raiders
2nd	7	39	Eddie Goldman	Defensive tackle	Chicago Bears
2nd	18	50	Ronald Darby	Defensive back	Buffalo Bills
3rd	14	78	P. J. Williams	Cornerback	New Orleans Saints
4th	12	111	Tre' Jackson	Guard	New England Patriots
5th	3	139	Rashad Greene	Wide receiver	Jacksonville Jaguars
5th	19	155	Karlos Williams	Running back	Buffalo Bills
6th	18	194	Nick O'Leary	Tight end	Buffalo Bills
7th	9	226	Bobby Hart	Offensive tackle	New York Giants

Offensive lineman Josue Matias went on to sign with the Tennessee Titans as an undrafted free agent while wide receiver Jarred Haggins signed with the Detroit Lions.
