= Ron Sellers =

American football player (born 1947)

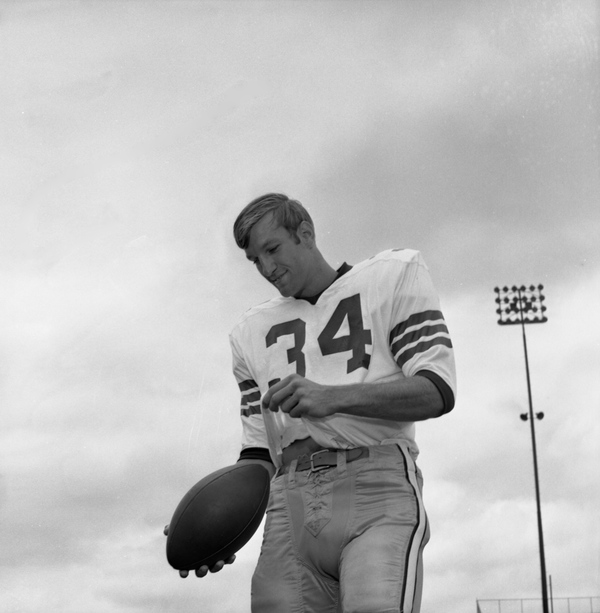
- Sellers in 1968 at FSU

No. 34, 88
- Position: Wide receiver

Personal information
- Born: February 5, 1947 (age 79); Jacksonville, Florida, U.S.
- Listed height: 6 ft 4 in (1.93 m)
- Listed weight: 205 lb (93 kg)

Career information
- High school: Paxon (Jacksonville)
- College: Florida State
- NFL draft: 1969: 1st round, 6th overall pick

Career history
- Boston / New England Patriots (1969–1971); Dallas Cowboys (1972); Miami Dolphins (1973)

Awards and highlights
- Super Bowl champion (VIII); AFL All-Star (1969); Consensus All-American (1967); First-team All-American (1968); Florida State Seminoles Jersey No. 34 honored

Career NFL/AFL statistics
- Receptions: 112
- Receiving yards: 2,184
- Receiving touchdowns: 18
- Stats at Pro Football Reference
- College Football Hall of Fame

Ronald Franklin "Jingle Joints" Sellers (born February 5, 1947) is an American former professional football player who was a wide receiver in the American Football League (AFL) and National Football League (NFL). He played college football for the Florida State Seminoles, twice earning All-American honors (1967, 1968). Despite being limited to a total of 30 games of regular season eligibility, Sellers still holds Florida State career record for most 200-yard receiving games. He was inducted into the College Football Hall of Fame in 1988. He played pro ball for the AFL's Boston Patriots in 1969, when he was an AFL All-Star, then for the NFL's Patriots, Dallas Cowboys and Miami Dolphins.

== Early life ==
Sellers attended Paxon High School in Jacksonville where he excelled in football and basketball. He helped his team win the 1965 state basketball championship. In 2007, he was named to The State of Florida's "100 Greatest High School Football Players in Florida History".

== Florida State University ==
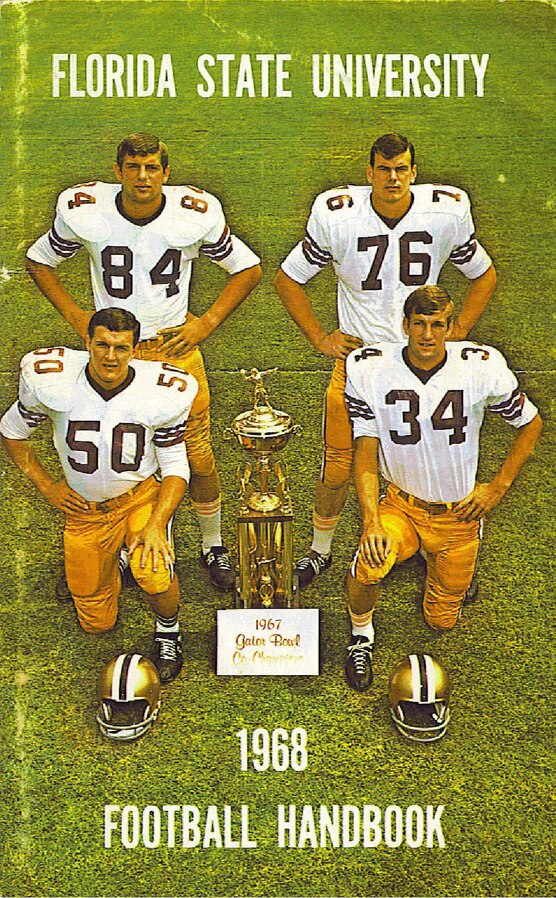
Sellers (bottom right) poses with a 1967 Gator Bowl trophy on the cover of their 1968 media guide

Sellers went on to star at Florida State University as a split end and flanker in Bill Peterson's pro-style offense. In 1967 and 1968 he received All-American honors. He recorded 212 receptions for 3,598 yards (an NCAA record at the time) and 23 touchdowns. His number 34 jersey was retired by the school until he gave linebacker Ernie Sims permission to use it while playing for the Seminoles.

Sellers still holds 17 receiving and scoring records at Florida State University, including marks for single-season receptions (86), single-season receiving (1,496), single-game receptions (16), single-game receiving yards (270) and single-game receiving touchdowns (5). He holds the record for having 4 of the top 5 all-time games in receiving yardage in FSU history and eclipsed 200 receiving yards in a game 5 times during his college career. Sellers caught 13 or more passes in 7 collegiate contests overall and averaged more than 7 receptions and 119 receiving yards per game while wearing the Seminole uniform. Memorable games included a school record 5 touchdown receptions against Wake Forest in 1968 and a 13 catch performance in the 1967 contest in Birmingham versus Alabama in which FSU snapped a 17 game Crimson Tide winning streak in the 37-37 tie.

In 1977 he was inducted into the Florida State University Hall of Fame. The school retired his #34 jersey while adding him to their Ring of Honor. Sellers is also a member of the Gator, Peach and Sun Bowl Halls of Fame. In 1988, he was the first FSU player to be inducted into the College Football Hall of Fame.

While there is some debate regarding the origin of the nickname ("Jingle Joints") he earned while at FSU, it is believed to have derived from a description of his distinctive running style and ability to perform sudden changes of direction while running routes.

== NFL career ==
=== New England Patriots ===
Sellers was selected by the Boston Patriots in the first round (6th overall) of the 1969 NFL/AFL draft. He earned AFL All-Star honors as a rookie after making 27 receptions for 705 yards, with 6 touchdowns averaging 26.1 yards per reception.

=== Dallas Cowboys ===
On July 13, 1972, he was traded to the Dallas Cowboys in exchange for a third round draft choice. That season, Sellers was promoted over Bob Hayes to take advantage of his big-play ability. He finished the year as the top receiver for Dallas with 31 receptions and 5 touchdowns, averaging 21.1 yards per catch. In the Divisional Playoff game versus San Francisco, Sellers caught the winning touchdown pass from Roger Staubach with under a minute remaining, overcoming a 15-point 4th quarter deficit. The team traded him along with a second round draft choice to the Miami Dolphins, in exchange for Otto Stowe.

=== Miami Dolphins ===
In 1973 while battling injuries, he appeared in three games, catching two passes. He was released on September 10, 1974. He remains as one of the few NFL players to have played for both Tom Landry and Don Shula.

== Professional Career ==
Following his professional football career, Sellers founded Sellers Benefits Group in 1975, establishing it as a diversified insurance and consulting firm based in Florida. The company has since expanded to serve clients both statewide and nationally, providing services in risk management, insurance, and retirement planning. Under Sellers' leadership, the firm and its affiliated entities have secured licensure in 15 states, primarily across the southeastern United States. Sellers earned a Bachelor of Science degree in Risk Management from Florida State University in 1969. While playing for the New England Patriots in 1970, he obtained his Series 7 securities license and became a Registered Representative with Burgess & Leith in Boston. In 1983, he was awarded the Chartered Life Underwriter (CLU) designation by The American College. The Sellers Benefits Group has developed strategic national partnerships focused on 401(k) consulting, life insurance, risk and insurance strategies, and business telecommunications solutions. The firm works closely with affinity-based organizations, including associations, group purchasing organizations (GPOs), group medical organizations (GMOs), private equity firms, and professional employer organizations (PEOs). The Sellers Family of Companies includes: Sellers Benefits Group, LLC, Key Retirement Solutions, LLC, Key Telecom Solutions, LLC, American Key Partners, LLC, and Connect 1234, LLC

== Professional and Community Activities ==
Sellers has been extensively involved in professional and community activities, particularly those affiliated with Florida State University. He has served on the Florida State University Business School Advisory Board for over 20 years and was a longtime trustee of the FSU Foundation Board. In 1989, he chaired the FSU Capital Campaign Fund and served as Homecoming Grand Marshal. He was a member of the FSU Annual Fund Committee from 1991 to 1993, a founding board member of the University Center Club, and a member of the Presidential Search Committee in 1990. He was inducted into the Garnet & Gold Key Club in 1968 and named to Who's Who in American Colleges in 1969. He also served as president of the FSU Palm Beach County Seminole Boosters in 1990 and chaired the Palm Beach County Seminole Golf Tournament for four years. Beyond his university affiliations, Sellers was a board member of the State of Florida Golf Association and served as chairman and founder of the Treasure Coast Chapter of the National College Football Hall of Fame. He has held board positions with the Florida Chamber of Commerce, the Florida Economic Development Council, and the State of Florida Sports Hall of Fame. In the private sector, he served on the board of Flagler National Bank and the Florida Petroleum & Marketers Association. He was also president of Mayacoo Lakes Country Club in 1990.

== Social and Leisure Activities ==
An avid golfer and tennis player, Sellers, along with former Cowboy teammate Lee Roy Jordan, captured the Professional Football Players Tennis Tournament doubles championship in Arizona. He holds a combined 11 club championships in golf at the Mayacoo Lakes Country Club in West Palm Beach, Florida and the Country Club of Sapphire Valley in Sapphire, North Carolina.

While having resided in Boston, Massachusetts, Dallas, Texas, Miami, Florida, and Sapphire, North Carolina, Sellers has held a permanent residence and corporate office in Palm Beach Gardens, Florida since his retirement from the NFL in 1975.
