= Chris Rix =

American football player (born 1981)

No. 16 – Florida State Seminoles
- Position: Quarterback

Personal information
- Born: May 1, 1981 (age 45); Santa Margarita, California, U.S.
- Listed height: 6 ft 4 in (1.93 m)
- Listed weight: 210 lb (95 kg)

Career information
- High school: Santa Margarita Catholic (Rancho Santa Margarita, California)
- College: Florida State (2000−2004)

Awards and highlights
- ACC Rookie of the Year (2001)
- Stats at ESPN

Christopher Charles Rix (born May 1, 1981) is an American sportscaster and former college football player. He played quarterback for the Florida State Seminoles.

== Early life ==
Chris Rix was born and raised in upstate New York. He is of Filipino, German, and Irish descent. Rix was primarily raised by his father Christopher Carroll Rix, after his mother died from cancer in 1989 when Rix was 7 years old. After his mother's death, Rix and his father moved to Seattle, WA and lived there from 1989 to 1995. Prior to entering high school, Rix and his father moved to Southern California to be closer to his family. Chris Rix attended both Bishop Amat Memorial High School and Santa Margarita Catholic High School, graduating in 2000.

== College career ==
Chris Rix is the first and only four year starter at quarterback (2001–2004) in the school's history, having played under Bobby Bowden. Rix ranks third in every major passing category at FSU. During Rix's career at Florida State, the Seminoles claimed three Atlantic Coast Conference (ACC) titles and appeared in four straight bowl games.

Rix had his most successful season in 2003 when he passed for 3,107 yards and 23 touchdowns. He ranks second in school history in passes attempted, completed, and touchdowns thrown. Rix missed the 2003 Sugar Bowl after he overslept and missed an exam while sleeping in his car in a handicap parking spot, subsequently causing him to be disciplined by sitting him for that year's final game.

Rix was named the Atlantic Coast Conference (ACC) freshman of the year, and he is the first, and only, four-year starter in Florida State history. His loyalty to Coach Bobby Bowden was the key factor in his decision to forego entering the NFL draft after his Junior year.

== Career statistics ==
=== College ===
College statistics
Year	Team	Games			Passing								Rushing			
Year	Team	GP	GS	Record	Cmp	Att	Pct	Yds	Avg	TD	Int	Rate	Att	Yds	Avg	TD
2000	Florida State	0	0	—	Redshirted (redshirt)											
2001	Florida State	12	12	8–4	165	286	57.7	2,734	9.6	24	13	156.6	99	389	3.9	3
2002	Florida State	11	9	6–3	118	225	52.4	1,684	7.5	13	7	128.2	86	289	3.4	3
2003	Florida State	13	13	10–3	216	382	56.5	3,107	8.1	27	13	137.9	89	130	1.5	5
2004	Florida State	8	5	4–1	76	149	51.0	865	5.8	3	7	97.0	32	15	2.7	1
Career		44	39	28–11	575	1,042	55.2	8,390	8.1	63	40	135.1	306	823	2.7	12

== Broadcasting career ==
Rix went undrafted in the 2005 NFL draft. He was invited to the San Diego Chargers' rookie camp on a tryout basis. Within the same year he began a career in sports broadcasting, first as a high school football analyst for Fox Sports Net in Los Angeles. In 2005, he worked as a college football analyst for Fox Sports Radio. Then in 2006 he signed with CSTV, a division of CBS, to work as a color commentator and analyst in their coverage of college football games. Rix was the sideline reporter for FOX Sports for the 2006 Cotton Bowl Classic between Texas Tech and Alabama as well as a FOX NFL game between the San Diego Chargers and the Arizona Cardinals. In 2007, Rix served as a college football studio analyst for ABC in Los Angeles.

Rix currently is a college football and NFL analyst for Fox Sports Radio. He is also a regular contributor on the Chris Myers and Steve Hartman Show, along with hosting Fox Gametime segments as a part of the Clear Channel Radio Affiliate.

== Ministerial career ==
After his playing career Rix founded the Champion Training Academy, and The Champion Organization. The venture focuses on developing and mentoring young athletes. In the spring of 2008, Bishop Amat High School named Rix as the school's varsity quarterbacks coach. Following one successful season, Rix resigned as a full-time coach to focus on family, sportscasting, and ministry.

Rix served as the Master of Ceremonies for the 2010 BCS National Championship Game's breakfast on January 5, 2010. The event was hosted by the Fellowship of Christian Athletes, who hired Rix as the Director of Ministries for the San Gabriel Valley in Los Angeles, CA.

== Personal ==
Rix currently resides in La Verne, California, with his wife Anita, and their five children. He runs the Champion Training Academy. He also runs P.E. at Western Christian P.S.P.
