= Greg Allen (American football) =

American football player (born 1963)

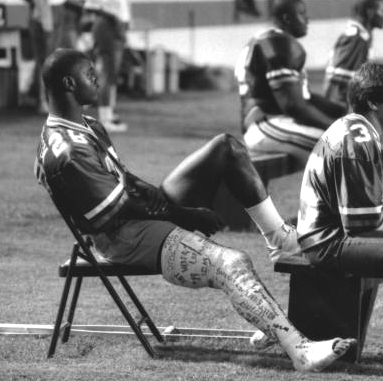
- Allen in a leg cast at FSU

No. 26, 28
- Position: Running back

Personal information
- Born: June 4, 1963 (age 63); Milton, Florida, U.S.
- Listed height: 5 ft 11 in (1.80 m)
- Listed weight: 200 lb (91 kg)

Career information
- High school: Milton
- College: Florida State (1981–1984)
- NFL draft: 1985: 2nd round, 35th overall pick

Career history
- Cleveland Browns (1985); Tampa Bay Buccaneers (1986); Indianapolis Colts (1987)*; Kansas City Chiefs (1987)*
- * Offseason or practice squad member only

Awards and highlights
- Consensus All-American (1983); First-team All-American (1984); First-team All-South Independent (1982); Florida State Seminoles Hall of Fame

Career NFL statistics
- Rushing yards: 35
- Rushing average: 3.9
- Stats at Pro Football Reference

Gregory W. Allen (born June 4, 1963) is an American former professional football player who was a running back in the National Football League (NFL). He played college football for the Florida State Seminoles and was selected by the Cleveland Browns in the second round of the 1985 NFL draft. He also played for the Tampa Bay Buccaneers.

== College career ==
Allen was Florida State's all-time leading rusher with 3,769 yards until Warrick Dunn broke it in 1996. He was a consensus All-American in 1983 after rushing for 1,134 yards with 13 touchdowns.

=== College statistics ===
Legend
**Bold**	Career high

Year	Team	Games	Rushing				Receiving			
Year	Team	GP	Att	Yds	Avg	TD	Rec	Yds	Avg	TD
1981	Florida State	9	139	888	6.4	3	5	35	7.0	0
1982	Florida State	11	152	776	5.1	**20**	**16**	**233**	**14.6**	**1**
1983	Florida State	11	**200**	**1,134**	5.7	12	11	96	8.7	0
1984	Florida State	9	133	971	**7.3**	8	2	12	6.0	0
Total		40	624	3,769	6.0	43	34	376	11.1	1

== Professional career ==
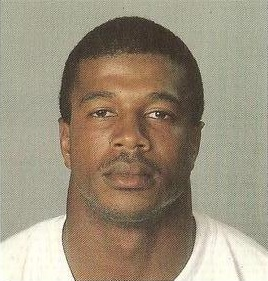
Allen in 1985

Allen was selected by the Cleveland Browns in the second round, with the 35th overall pick, of the 1985 NFL draft. He officially signed with the team on July 25. He played in seven games for the Browns in 1985, rushing eight times for 32 yards, before being placed on injured reserve on October 25, 1985. Allen was released on September 1, 1986.

He was signed by the Tampa Bay Buccaneers on November 12, 1986. He appeared in two games during the 1986 season, rushing once for three yards. Allen signed with the Indianapolis Colts on May 11, 1987. He was released on August 31, 1987, before the start of the season. He was signed by the Kansas City Chiefs on October 8, 1987. He did not appear in any games for the Chiefs and was later placed on injured reserve and released.

== See also ==
- List of NCAA major college football yearly scoring leaders
