= Lawrence Dawsey =

American football player and coach (born 1967)

Jacksonville State Gamecocks
- Title: Wide receivers coach

Personal information
- Born: November 16, 1967 (age 58); Dothan, Alabama, U.S.
- Listed height: 6 ft 0 in (1.83 m)
- Listed weight: 198 lb (90 kg)

Career information
- High school: Northview (Dothan)
- College: Florida State (1987–1990)
- NFL draft: 1991: 3rd round, 66th overall pick

Career history

Playing
- Tampa Bay Buccaneers (1991–1995); New York Giants (1996); Miami Dolphins (1997)*; New Orleans Saints (1999)
- * Offseason or practice squad member only

Coaching
- Tampa Catholic HS (FL) (1998) Assistant coach; Howard W. Blake HS (FL) (2002) Assistant coach; LSU (2003) Graduate assistant; South Florida (2004–2006) Wide receivers coach; Florida State (2007–2009) Wide receivers coach; Florida State (2010–2013) Pass game coordinator & wide receivers coach; Florida State (2014–2017) Co-offensive coordinator & wide receivers coach; Texas A&M (2020–2021) Offensive analyst; Appalachian State (2022–2024) Wide receivers coach; Jacksonville State (2025–present) Wide receivers coach

Awards and highlights
- UPI NFL-NFC Rookie of the Year (1991); PFWA All-Rookie Team (1991); First-team All-American (1990); First Team All South Independent (1989); 2X BCS National (2003,2013)

Career NFL statistics
- Receptions: 240
- Receiving yards: 3,271
- Receiving touchdowns: 6
- Stats at Pro Football Reference

Lawrence Leneir Dawsey (born November 16, 1967) is an American former professional football player who was a wide receiver in the National Football League (NFL) for eight seasons. He is currently the wide receivers coach at Jacksonville State University, a position he has held since 2025. Dawsey played college football for the Florida State Seminoles, and was recognized as an All-American. He was chosen 66th overall by the Tampa Bay Buccaneers in the third round of the 1991 NFL draft, and won the UPI NFL-NFC Rookie of the Year award in 1991.

Pre-draft measurables
Height	Weight	Arm length	Hand span	40-yard dash	10-yard split	20-yard split	20-yard shuttle	Vertical jump
6 ft 0 3/8 in (1.84 m)	192 lb (87 kg)	31 in (0.79 m)	9 3/8 in (0.24 m)	4.68 s	1.71 s	2.74 s	4.31 s	33.5 in (0.85 m)
