= 2012 Florida State Seminoles football team =

American college football season

2012 Florida State Seminoles football

ACC champion ACC Atlantic Division co-champion Orange Bowl champion

ACC Championship, W 21–15 vs. Georgia Tech

Orange Bowl, W 31–10 vs. Northern Illinois
- Conference: Atlantic Coast Conference
- Atlantic Division

Ranking
- Coaches: No. 8
- AP: No. 10
- Record: 12–2 (7–1 ACC)
- Head coach: Jimbo Fisher (3rd season)
- Offensive coordinator: James Coley (3rd season)
- Offensive scheme: Pro-style
- Defensive coordinator: Mark Stoops (3rd season; regular season); D. J. Eliot (interim; postseason)
- Base defense: Multiple 4–3
- Captains: Toshmon Stevens; Vince Williams; Everett Dawkins; Anthony McCloud; Nick Moody; EJ Manuel; Brandon Jenkins; Lonnie Pryor Rodney Smith Dustin Hopkins Chris Thompson
- Home stadium: Doak Campbell Stadium

2012 Atlantic Coast Conference football standings
	Conf.			Overall
Team	W		L	W		L
Atlantic Division
No. 10 Florida State xy$	7	–	1	12	–	2
No. 11 Clemson x	7	–	1	11	–	2
NC State	4	–	4	7	–	6
Wake Forest	3	–	5	5	–	7
Maryland	2	–	6	4	–	8
Boston College	1	–	7	2	–	10
Coastal Division
Georgia Tech xy	5	–	3	7	–	7
North Carolina†	5	–	3	8	–	4
Miami (FL)‡	5	–	3	7	–	5
Virginia Tech	4	–	4	7	–	6
Duke	3	–	5	6	–	7
Virginia	2	–	6	4	–	8
Championship: Florida State 21, Georgia Tech 15
$ – BCS representative as conference champion; x – Division champion/co-champions; y – Championship game participant; † North Carolina ineligible for ACC title, championship game, and bowl game due to NCAA sanctions. ‡ Miami ineligible for ACC title, championship game, and bowl game due to self-imposed sanctions.; Rankings from AP Poll

The 2012 Florida State Seminoles football team, variously Florida State or FSU, represented Florida State University in the sport of American football during the 2012 NCAA Division I FBS football season. The Seminoles were led by third-year head coach Jimbo Fisher, and played their home games at Bobby Bowden Field at Doak Campbell Stadium in Tallahassee, Florida. They were members of the Atlantic Coast Conference, playing in the Atlantic Division. 2012 marked the Seminoles' 21st season as a member of the ACC and their eighth in the ACC's Atlantic Division.

During the 2012 season, Florida State won its first ACC title since 2005, advancing to their first BCS bowl since that season as well, and won ten regular season games for the first time since the 2003 season. The Seminoles also won their first BCS game since the 2000 Sugar Bowl. The team also tied the school record for most games won in a single season and finished in the top ten of both major polls for the first time since the 2000 season.

== Forthcoming season ==
After the completion of the 2011 season, the Seminoles signed a highly rated recruiting class in February 2012 and completed spring practice the following April. With seventeen returning starters from the previous season, Florida State entered their 2012 campaign ranked as the number seven team in the nation and as a favorite to win the Atlantic Division and compete for the ACC championship and possibly a national title.

=== Preseason ===
Before the start of the season, the Seminoles were scheduled to play the West Virginia Mountaineers on September 8, but the game was canceled by the Mountaineers so they could make room for their nine-game Big 12 schedule. With the late cancellation, Florida State was forced to add another Football Championship Subdivision team to its schedule. Because of this, Florida State needed an additional win to be eligible for a bowl game.

On August 1, 2012, Florida State kicked senior cornerback and punt return specialist Greg Reid off the team. Coach Fisher announced Reid's dismissal for what he described as a violation of team rules. The dismissal came three weeks after Reid was charged with marijuana possession after being stopped by a Georgia state trooper near his home in Valdosta, Georgia.

Former Penn State tight end Kevin Haplea also transferred to Florida State in the wake of the Penn State child sex abuse scandal.

Spring Game

The annual 'Garnet and Gold Game' was held on April 14 at Bobby Bowden Field at Doak Campbell Stadium and the garnet team was victorious, winning by a score of 35–20. The game was televised on ESPNU with former FSU player Danny Kanell as commentator.

=== Postseason ===
Defensive coordinator Mark Stoops left his position at Florida State to take the job as head coach at Kentucky. D. J. Eliot left his position as defensive ends coach to assist Stoops at Kentucky as defensive coordinator. Eddie Gran, who served as runningback coach and special teams coordinator as well as associate head coach, also left the staff to serve as offensive coordinator at Cincinnati.

== Personnel ==
2012 was Jimbo Fisher's third year as the Seminoles' head coach. During his previous two years with Florida State, he led the Seminoles to an overall record of 19 wins and 8 losses (19–8). Mark Stoops and James Coley returned to their positions as coordinators.

=== Coaching staff ===
Florida State Seminoles coaches

Head coach

- Jimbo Fisher

Assistant coaches

- Eddie Gran – Associate head coach, running backs coach and special teams coordinator
- Rick Trickett– Assistant head coach and offensive line coach
- Greg Hudson – Assistant head coach and linebackers coach
- Mark Stoops – Defensive coordinator and secondary coach
- James Coley – Offensive Coordinator and tight end coach
- Dameyune Craig – Quarterbacks Coach/recruiting coordinator
- Lawrence Dawsey – Passing game coordinator and wide receivers coach
- D. J. Eliot – Defensive ends coach
- Odell Haggins – Defensive line coach
- Vic viloria – Head strength and conditioning coach

== Returning starters ==
=== Key losses ===
- OT Zebrie Sanders
- WR Bert Reed
- LB Nigel Bradham
- S Terrance Parks
- S Mike Harris
- P Shawn Powell
- CB Greg Reid (dismissed from team)

=== Transfers ===
- TE Kevin Haplea

=== Offense ===
Player	Class	Position
EJ Manuel	Senior	Quarterback
Lonnie Pryor	Senior	Full Back
Devonta Freeman	Sophomore	Running Back
Rodney Smith	Senior	Wide Receiver
Jacob Fahrenkrug	Senior	Offensive Lineman
Bryan Stork	Junior	Center
Garrett Faircloth	Junior	Offensive Lineman
Bobby Hart	Sophomore	Offensive Tackle

=== Defense ===
Player	Class	Position
Björn Werner	Junior	Defensive End
Everett Dawkins	Senior	Defensive tackle
Anthony McCloud	Senior	Defensive tackle
Brandon Jenkins	Senior	Defensive End
Christian Jones	Junior	Linebacker
Vince Williams	Senior	Linebacker
Xavier Rhodes	Junior	Cornerback
Lamarcus Joyner	Junior	Safety

=== Special teams ===
Player	Class	Position
Dustin Hopkins	Senior	Placekicker

== Media ==
Florida State football was broadcast on the Florida State University Seminoles Radio Network and the games were called by Gene Deckerhoff.

== Rankings ==
Entering the 2012 season, Florida State was ranked No. 7 in both the AP and Coaches' Preseason Polls. ESPN ranked the Seminoles number seven before the season. Florida State was ranked No. 9 in the first Harris Poll. In the initial BCS poll, Florida State was ranked No. 14. Florida State finished the season ranked No. 10 in the AP Poll and No. 8 in the coaches' poll.

Ranking movements Legend: ██ Increase in ranking ██ Decrease in ranking т = Tied with team above or below ( ) = First-place votes
	Week															
Poll	Pre	1	2	3	4	5	6	7	8	9	10	11	12	13	14	Final
AP	7	6	5 т	4	4	3	12	12	11	9	8	10	10	13	13	10
Coaches	7 (1)	6	6	4	4 (1)	4 (1)	11	10	10	7	6	6	5	12	12	8
Harris	Not released						9	8	10	7	6	6	6	12	12	Not released
BCS	Not released							14	12	9	10	10	10	13	12	Not released

*Source: ESPN.com: 2012 NCAA Football Rankings

== Schedule ==
Date	Time	Opponent	Rank	Site	TV	Result	Attendance
September 1	6:00 p.m.	Murray State*	No. 7	Doak Campbell Stadium; Tallahassee, FL	ESPN3	W 69–3	70,047
September 8	6:00 p.m.	Savannah State*	No. 6	Doak Campbell Stadium; Tallahassee, FL	ESPN3	W 55–0	71,126
September 15	Noon	Wake Forest	No. 5	Doak Campbell Stadium; Tallahassee, FL	ESPN, ESPN 3D	W 52–0	68,833
September 22	8:00 p.m.	No. 10 Clemson	No. 4	Doak Campbell Stadium; Tallahassee, FL (rivalry, College GameDay)	ABC	W 49–37	83,231
September 29	6:00 p.m.	at South Florida*	No. 4	Raymond James Stadium; Tampa, FL	ESPN	W 30–17	69,383
October 6	8:00 p.m.	at NC State	No. 3	Carter–Finley Stadium; Raleigh, NC	ESPN2	L 16–17	54,962
October 13	5:30 p.m.	Boston College	No. 12	Doak Campbell Stadium; Tallahassee, FL	ESPN2	W 51–7	81,075
October 20	8:00 p.m.	at Miami (FL)	No. 12	Sun Life Stadium; Miami Gardens, FL (rivalry)	ABC	W 33–20	73,328
October 27	3:30 p.m.	Duke^{†}	No. 11	Doak Campbell Stadium; Tallahassee, FL	ESPNU	W 48–7	71,467
November 8	7:30 p.m.	at Virginia Tech	No. 8	Lane Stadium; Blacksburg, VA	ESPN	W 28–22	65,632
November 17	Noon	at Maryland	No. 10	Byrd Stadium; College Park, MD	ESPNU	W 41–14	35,244
November 24	3:30 p.m.	No. 6 Florida*	No. 10	Doak Campbell Stadium; Tallahassee, FL (rivalry)	ABC	L 26–37	83,429
December 1	7:45 p.m.	vs. Georgia Tech	No. 13	Bank of America Stadium; Charlotte, NC (ACC Championship Game)	ESPN	W 21–15	64,778
January 1, 2013	8:30 p.m.	vs. No. 16 Northern Illinois*	No. 13	Sun Life Stadium; Miami Gardens, FL (Orange Bowl)	ESPN	W 31–10	72,073
*Non-conference game; ^{†}Homecoming; Rankings from AP Poll released prior to the game; All times are in Eastern time

== Game summaries ==
=== Murray State ===
Murray State at Florida State

Team	1	2	3	4	Total
Racers	0	3	0	0	3
• Seminoles	14	14	20	21	69

- Date: September 1
- Location: Doak Campbell Stadium
  Tallahassee, FL
- Game start: 6:00 p.m. EST
- Elapsed time: 3:35
- Game attendance: 70,047
- Game weather: 87 °F (31 °C), Wind: SSE 6mph, 30% rain/96 heat ind., 63% humidity, Partly Cloudy
- Referee: Tom Zimorski, ACC; Keith Roden (Umpire); Michael Kelley (Linesman); Tim Graham (Line judge); Delbert Bell (Back judge); Harris Tyson (Field judge); Angie Bartis (Side judge); Andrew Panucci (Scorer)
- TV announcers (ESPN3): Shawn Kennedy (play-by-play), Rene Ingoglia (color analyst), Michael Cain (reporter)

Scoring summary
1	13:31	FSU	Rashad Greene 47-yard punt return (Dustin Hopkins kick)	FSU 7–0
1	5:05	FSU	Lonnie Pryor 1 yard run (Dustin Hopkins kick)	FSU 14–0
2	6:57	FSU	Lonnie Pryor 18 yard run (Dustin Hopkins kick)	FSU 21–0
2	4:36	MSU	Benton, Jordan 28 yard field goal	FSU 21–3
2	00:29	FSU	Kenny Shaw 6 yard pass from EJ Manuel (Dustin Hopkins kick)	FSU 28–3
3	12:57	FSU	James Wilder, Jr. 9 yard run (Dustin Hopkins kick)	FSU 35–3
3	9:27	FSU	Dustin Hopkins 23 yard field goal	FSU 38–3
3	7:53	FSU	Lonnie Pryor 1 yard run (Dustin Hopkins kick)	FSU 45–3
3	1:37	FSU	Dustin Hopkins 30 yard field goal	FSU 48–3
4	10:24	FSU	Debrale Smiley 1 yard run (Dustin Hopkins kick)	FSU 55–3
4	6:01	FSU	James Wilder, Jr. 7 yard run (Dustin Hopkins kick)	FSU 62–3
4	1:51	FSU	Debrale Smiley 1 yard run (Dustin Hopkins kick)	FSU 69–3

To open the season, Florida State faced an FCS opponent, the Murray State Racers. This game was the first between the two teams. Coming into the game, Florida State held a 17–0 record against teams from the Football Championship Subdivision.

Florida State dominated the Racers throughout the game, winning 69–3. Florida State opened the scoring and scored 14 points in the first quarter, with Rashad Greene returning a 47-yard punt return from kicker Dustin Hopkins and a 1-yard touchdown run from Lonnie Pryor. Florida State added another fourteen points in the second quarter as the result of an 18-yard touchdown run from Lonnie Pryor and a 6-yard touchdown pass from EJ Manuel to Kenny Shaw. Murray State scored its first and only points near the end of the first half on a 28-yard field goal. In the third quarter, Florida State scored 20 points. James Wilder Jr. had a 9-yard touchdown run, Dustin Hopkins kicked a 23-yard field goal, Lonnie Pryor had a 1-yard touchdown run, and Dustin Hopkins kicked another 30-yard field goal. Florida State scored another 21 points in the fourth quarter with a 7-yard touchdown run from James Wilder Jr. and two 1-yard touchdown runs from Debrale Smiley.

EJ Manuel led the team in passing with 188 yards and one touchdown; James Wilder Jr. led the team in rushing with 12 carries for 106 yards and two touchdowns; Kenny Shaw led the team in receiving with 4 receptions for 82 yards and one touchdown. Xavier Rhodes recorded one interception and Karlos Williams returned a punt for a touchdown. Dustin Hopkins successfully attempted two field goals. The Seminoles totaled 606 yards of offense in the game, with 285 rushing yards and 321 passing yards while holding Murray State to 156 total yards of offense.

=== Savannah State ===
Savannah State at Florida State

Team	1	2	3	4	Total
Tigers	0	0	0	-	0
• Seminoles	35	13	7	-	55

- Date: September 8
- Location: Doak Campbell Stadium
  Tallahassee, FL
- Game start: 6:04 p.m. EST
- Elapsed time: 3:30
- Game attendance: 71,126
- Game weather: 82 °F (28 °C), Wind: S 7mph, 30% rain, 87% humidity, Showers
- Referee: Walter Davenport, ACC; David Goodwin (Umpire); Mike Pavese (Linesman); Allen Andrick (Line judge); Scott Maslin (Back judge); Chris Brown (Field judge); Jim Corpora (Side judge); Dennis Redding (Scorer)
- TV announcers (ESPN3): Dave Weekley (play-by-play), Ralph Friedgen (color analyst), Tiffany Greene (reporter)

Scoring summary
1	14:21	FSU	Rodney Smith 61-yard pass from EJ Manuel (Dustin Hopkins kick)	FSU 7–0
1	11:51	FSU	Chris Thompson 6 yard run (Dustin Hopkins kick)	FSU 14–0
1	8:53	FSU	Greg Dent 8 yard pass from EJ Manuel (Dustin Hopkins kick)	FSU 21–0
1	7:57	FSU	Kelvin Benjamin 9 yard pass from EJ Manuel	FSU 28–0
1	00:49	FSU	Devonta Freeman 5 yard run (Dustin Hopkins kick)	FSU 35–0
2	10:06	FSU	James Wilder Jr. 19 yard run (Dustin Hopkins kick)	FSU 42–0
2	8:02	FSU	James Wilder Jr. 1 yard run, PAT Failed	FSU 48–0
3	11:24	FSU	Kelvin Benjamin 19 yard pass From Jacob Coker (Dustin Hopkins kick)	FSU 55–0

For their second game of the season, Florida State faced another FCS team, the Savannah State Tigers. This was also the first meeting between these teams. Prior to the game, the Seminoles were installed as 70 1/2 point favorites, reportedly making Savannah State the biggest underdogs in any college football game ever.

Florida State held the Tigers scoreless, winning 55–0. Florida State opened the scoring and scored 35 points in the first quarter, with a 61-yard touchdown pass from EJ Manuel to Rodney Smith, a 6-yard touchdown run from Chris Thompson, an 8-yard touchdown pass from E.J. Manuel to Greg Dent, a 9-yard touchdown pass from E.J. Manuel to Kelvin Benjamin, and a 5-yard touchdown run from Devonta Freeman. Florida State added another thirteen points in the second quarter as the result of a 19-yard touchdown run from James Wilder, Jr. and another 1-yard touchdown run from James Wilder, Jr. with a subsequent failed point-after-attempt from kicker Dustin Hopkins, ending his streak of 145 consecutive extra point attempts. Florida State scored another seven points in the third quarter as the result of a 19-yard touchdown pass from Jacob Coker to Kelvin Benjamin.

E.J. Manuel led the team in passing with 161 yards and three touchdowns; Devonta Freeman led the team in rushing with 7 carries for 69 yards and one touchdown; Rodney Smith led the team in receiving with 3 receptions for 77 yards and one touchdown. The Seminoles totaled 413 yards of offense in the game, with 167 rushing yards and 246 passing yards while holding Savannah State to just 28 total yards of offense.

The game was delayed in the second quarter, used a running clock after halftime and later called with 8:49 left in the third due to weather.

=== Wake Forest ===
Wake Forest at Florida State
("True Seminole" Game)

Team	1	2	3	4	Total
Demon Deacons	0	0	0	0	0
• Seminoles	14	24	7	7	52

- Date: September 15
- Location: Doak Campbell Stadium
  Tallahassee, FL
- Game start: 12:01 p.m. EST
- Elapsed time: 3:19
- Game attendance: 68,833
- Game weather: 83 °F (28 °C), Wind: ENE 10mph, 20% rain, 87% humidity, Scattered Clouds
- Referee: David Epperley, ACC; Michael Webster (Umpire); Michael Kelley (Linesman); Rick Page (Line judge); James Cole (Back judge); Pat Garvey (Field judge); Mike Safrit (Side judge); Ted Jackson (Scorer)
- TV announcers (ESPN): Dave Pasch (play-by-play), Brian Griese (color analyst), Jenn Brown (sideline)

Scoring summary
1	4:28	FSU	EJ Manuel 16 yard run (Dustin Hopkins kick)	FSU 7–0
1	2:45	FSU	Rashad Greene 60 yard punt return (Dustin Hopkins kick)	FSU 14–0
2	12:52	FSU	Chris Thompson 74 yard run (Dustin Hopkins kick)	FSU 21–0
2	9:42	FSU	Chris Thompson 80 yard run (Dustin Hopkins kick)	FSU 28–0
2	4:37	FSU	Dustin Hopkins 19 yard field goal	FSU 31–0
2	00:14	FSU	Rodney Smith 20 yard pass from EJ Manuel (Dustin Hopkins kick)	FSU 38–0
3	00:44	FSU	Kenny Shaw 17 yard pass from EJ Manuel (Dustin Hopkins kick)	FSU 45–0
4	12:21	FSU	Debrale Smiley 18 yard run (Dustin Hopkins kick)	FSU 52–0

Florida State opened ACC play against the Wake Forest Demon Deacons. The teams last met the previous season with Wake Forest upsetting the Seminoles 35–30 in Winston-Salem. Florida State has struggled against Wake Forest recently, losing four out of the last six before this game.

Florida State shutout a team for the second week in a row by holding Wake Forest scoreless for the second time in three years and winning 52–0. Despite a sluggish start, Florida State scored first with a 16-yard rushing touchdown from EJ Manuel late in the first quarter. Another touchdown in the first quarter came from Rashad Greene with a 60-yard punt return. After a fourteen-point first quarter, the Seminoles scored twenty-four more points in the second with a 74-yard touchdown run and an 80-yard touchdown run from Chris Thompson, a field goal from Dustin Hopkins, and a 20-yard touchdown pass from E.J. Manuel to Rodney Smith. Florida State dominated the second half of the game as well. The Seminoles added seven points in the third quarter with a 17-yard touchdown pass from E.J. Manuel to Kenny Shaw. They finished off the game with seven points in the fourth quarter courtesy of an 18-yard touchdown run from Debrale Smiley.

E.J. Manuel led the team in passing with 176 yards and two touchdowns; Chris Thompson led the team in rushing with 9 carries for 197 yards and two touchdowns; Kelvin Benjamin led the team in receiving with 4 receptions for 44 yards. Dustin Hopkins successfully attempted one field goal. The Seminoles totaled 612 yards of offense in the game, with 385 rushing yards and 227 passing yards while holding Wake Forest to 126 total yards of offense. The victory improved Florida State's all-time record against the Deacons to 24–6–1.

=== Clemson ===
Clemson at Florida State (Clemson–Florida State football rivalry)

Team	1	2	3	4	Total
Tigers	14	7	10	6	37
• Seminoles	7	7	21	14	49

- Date: September 22
- Location: Doak Campbell Stadium
  Tallahassee, FL
- Game start: 8:12 p.m. EST
- Elapsed time: 3:38
- Game attendance: 83,221
- Game weather: 87 °F (31 °C), Wind: NNW 5mph, 0% rain, 46% humidity, clear skies
- Referee: Tom Zimorski, ACC; Jim Eckl (Umpire); Michael Kelley (Linesman); Tim Graham (Line judge); Delbert Bell (Back judge); Harris Tyson (Field judge); Angie Bartis (Side judge); Frank Kosman (Scorer)
- TV announcers (ABC): Brent Musburger (play-by-play), Kirk Herbstreit (color analyst), Heather Cox (sideline)

Scoring summary
1	13:34	CLEM	DeAndre Hopkins 60 yard pass From Tajh Boyd (Chandler Catanzaro kick)	CLEM 7–0
1	10:54	FSU	Lonnie Pryor 13 yard run (Dustin Hopkins kick)	tied 7–7
1	7:01	CLEM	Andre Ellington 6 yard run (Chandler Catanzaro kick)	Clem 14–7
2	14:35	FSU	James Wilder, Jr. 5 yard run (Dustin Hopkins kick)	tied 14–14
2	10:06	CLEM	Brandon Ford 17 yard pass from Tajh Boyd (Chandler Catanzaro kick)	Clem 21–14
3	11:48	CLEM	Andre Ellington 52 yard pass from Sammy Watkins (Chandler Catanzaro kick)	Clem 28–14
3	10:09	FSU	Chris Thompson 9 yard run (Dustin Hopkins kick)	Clem 28–21
3	7:07	CLEM	Chandler Catanzaro 50 yard field goal	Clem 31–21
3	6:15	FSU	Rashad Greene 9 yard pass from EJ Manuel (Dustin Hopkins kick)	Clem 31–28
3	2:37	FSU	Rodney Smith 29 yard pass from EJ Manuel (Dustin Hopkins kick)	FSU 35–31
4	13:25	FSU	James Wilder Jr. 5 yard run (Dustin Hopkins kick)	FSU 42–31
4	8:34	FSU	Chris Thompson 27 yard run (Dustin Hopkins kick)	FSU 49–31
4	2:11	CLEM	Brandon Ford 3 yard pass from Tajh Boyd (Two-Point Run Conversion Failed)	FSU 49–37

Following its meeting with Wake Forest, Florida State hosted the Clemson Tigers in a key division game. Clemson defeated Florida State the previous season 35–30 at Death Valley en route to the Atlantic Division title and an ACC Championship. The winner of this game has represented the Atlantic Division in the ACC Championship Game for the past three years with Clemson winning the division title in 2009, Florida State winning the division title in 2010 and Clemson taking the division title the following year. ESPN's College Gameday was on the campus of Florida State University for the game. The program previously visited the school for a game against Oklahoma during the 2011 season. It is their eighth time hosting and the show's twenty-fourth appearance at an FSU game.

Florida State won the game 49–37 after trailing by seven at halftime and erasing a fourteen-point deficit in the second half. Clemson struck first when, during the first drive of the game, Tajh Boyd hooked up with DeAndre Hopkins for a 60-yard touchdown pass. Florida State responded with a 13-yard touchdown run from Lonnie Pryor. The game then went back and forth throughout the first half with Clemson scoring on a 6-yard touchdown run from Andre Ellington and Florida State scoring with a James Wilder, Jr. 5-yard touchdown run. Clemson took the lead again with a 17-yard touchdown pass from Tajh Boyd to Brandon Ford after capitalizing on an FSU turnover. Clemson went into halftime with the lead. Florida State had many miscues that kept them from points, including two fumbles, two missed field goals, and a questionable 4th down call that kept them from leading.

In the second half, Clemson extended their lead to fourteen when Boyd connected to Sammy Watkins on a bubble screen who then threw the ball to Andre Ellington for a 52-yard touchdown. Florida State then took control of the game, as the Seminoles went on a 35–3 run. First, they scored on a 4-yard touchdown run from Chris Thompson. The defense, who had struggled containing the Tigers in the first half, held Clemson to a field goal which made it a ten-point game. Florida State then closed in on the lead with a 9-yard pass from EJ Manuel to Rashad Greene. They then finally took the lead at the end of the third quarter with a 29-yard touchdown pass from E.J. Manuel to Rodney Smith. This was followed by back-to-back touchdowns from Florida State with a 5-yard run from James Wilder, Jr. and a 27-yard run from Chris Thompson. Clemson scored one more touchdown late in the game with a 3-yard touchdown pass from Tajh Boyd to Brandon Ford on fourth down. They then attempted a two-point conversion which failed after a high snap. Florida State then ran out the clock to preserve the victory.

Quarterback E.J. Manuel had a career-best performance with 102 yards rushing, 380 yards passing along with 2 touchdowns as well as a rushing touchdown. He became the first Florida State player since Charlie Ward in 1992 to throw for 300 yards and rush for 100 in a game. Because of this accomplishment, Manuel was named the Davey O'Brien Quarterback of the Week. E.J. Manuel led the team in passing with 380 yards and two touchdowns; Chris Thompson led the team in rushing, with 15 carries for 103 yards and two touchdowns, and receiving, with 8 receptions for 79 yards. Dustin Hopkins unsuccessfully attempted two field goals. The Seminoles totaled 667 yards of offense in the game, with 287 rushing yards and 380 passing yards while holding Clemson's high powered offense to 426 total yards of offense. The victory improved Florida State's all-time record against the Tigers to 18–8.

=== South Florida ===
Florida State at South Florida

Team	1	2	3	4	Total
• Seminoles	7	6	17	0	30
Bulls	3	0	7	7	17

- Date: September 29
- Location: Raymond James Stadium
  Tampa, FL
- Game start: 6:00 p.m. EST
- Elapsed time: 3:30
- Game attendance: 69,383
- Game weather: 83 °F (28 °C), Wind: W 6mph, 61% humidity, Mostly Cloudy
- Referee: Ron Cherry, ACC; Tom Laverty (Umpire); Troy Gray (Linesman); Rober Zivkovic (Line judge); Barry Hendon (Back judge); Billy Beckett (Field judge); Richard Wilborn (Side judge)
- TV announcers (ESPN): Sean McDonough (play-by-play), Chris Spielman (color analyst), Quint Kessnich (sideline)

Scoring summary
1	11:18	USF	Maikon Bonani 32 yard field goal	USF 3–0
1	8:57	FSU	Rashad Greene 10 yard run (Dustin Hopkins kick)	FSU 7–3
2	5:45	FSU	Dustin Hopkins 6 yard field goal	FSU 10–3
2	00:03	FSU	Dustin Hopkins 43 yard field goal	FSU 13–3
3	11:55	USF	BJ Daniels 1 yard run (Maikon Bonani kick)	FSU 13–10
3	5:09	FSU	Kevin Haplea 1 yard pass from EJ Manuel (Dustin Hopkins kick)	FSU 20–10
3	00:34	FSU	Dustin Hopkins 23 yard field goal	FSU 23–10
3	00:00	FSU	Christian Jones 12 yard fumble return (Dustin Hopkins kick)	FSU 30–10
4	12:37	USF	BJ Daniels 3 yard run (Maikon Bonani kick)	FSU 30–17

In the first road game of the season, the Seminoles traveled to Tampa, Florida take on in-state foes, the South Florida Bulls. This was only the second meeting between these teams. The teams previously met during the 2009 season in Tallahassee where South Florida defeated Florida State 17–7.

Florida State won the game 30–17 despite a sluggish start. South Florida got on the board first with a 32-yard field goal from Maikon Bonani. Florida State took the lead with a 10-yard touchdown run from Rashad Greene. At the end of the first quarter, the Seminoles held a slim four point lead. They extended their lead in the second quarter with two field goals from Dustin Hopkins, a 6-yard field goal and a 23-yard field goal, after previously missing a field goal in the first quarter. Florida State carried a ten-point lead into the half.

At the start of the second half, South Florida closed the gap with a 1-yard touchdown run from B.J. Daniels. Florida State responded with a 1-yard touchdown pass from EJ Manuel to tight end Kevin Haplea and later extended their lead again with a 23-yard field goal from Hopkins. At the end of the third quarter, the Seminoles capitalized on a South Florida turnover when Christian Jones had a 12-yard fumble return to give the Seminoles their largest lead of the game. The Bulls scored again in the fourth quarter with B.J. Daniels 3-yard touchdown run, but Florida State was able to preserve a 13-point victory.

Quarterback E.J. Manuel had another impressive performance going 19/25 with one touchdown, no interceptions and 251 total yards of offense. Manuel led the team in passing with 242 yards and one touchdown; Chris Thompson led the team in rushing with 17 carries for 74 yards; Rashad Greene led the team in receiving with 2 receptions for 71 yards. Dustin Hopkins made two out of three field goals. The Seminoles totaled 425 yards of offense in the game, with 183 rushing yards and 242 passing yards while holding South Florida to 268 total yards of offense. The victory evened Florida State's all-time record against the Bulls at 1–1.

=== NC State ===
Florida State at NC State

Team	1	2	3	4	Total
Seminoles	3	13	0	0	16
• Wolfpack	0	0	3	14	17

- Date: October 6
- Location: Carter–Finley Stadium
  Raleigh, NC
- Game start: 8:00 p.m. EST
- Elapsed time: 3:40
- Game attendance: 54,962
- Game weather: 81 °F (27 °C), Wind: 0mph, Partly Cloudy
- Referee: Jerry Magallanne, ACC; Terrence Ramsey (Umpire); John Busch (Linesman); Deon Lawrence (Line judge); Pat Ryan (Back judge); Mike Cullin (Field judge); Jim Corpora (Side judge); Roger Warren (Scorer)
- TV announcers (ESPN2): Mark Jones (play-by-play), Brock Huard (color analyst), Shelley Smith and Jessica Mendoza (sideline)

Scoring summary
1	6:34	FSU	Dustin Hopkins 49 yard field goal	FSU 3–0
2	13:53	FSU	Nick O'Leary 4 yard pass from EJ Manuel (Dustin Hopkins kick)	FSU 10–0
2	4:07	FSU	Dustin Hopkins 20 yard field goal	FSU 13–0
2	00:28	FSU	Dustin Hopkins 36 yard field goal	FSU 16–0
3	6:50	NCST	Niklas Sade 27 yard field goal	FSU 16–3
4	13:47	NCST	Shadrach Thornton 24 yard pass from Mike Glennon (Niklas Sade kick)	FSU 16–10
4	00:16	NCST	Bryan Underwood 2 yard pass from Mike Glennon (Niklas Sade kick)	NCST 16–17

Following its trip to South Florida, Florida State traveled to Raleigh for their first ACC road game against the North Carolina State Wolfpack. Florida State shutout NC State 34–0 during the previous meeting in Tallahassee. The two schools have split their meetings over the past ten years, with Florida State winning five and N.C. State winning five and both teams have split the last two with N.C. State winning at home in 2010 and Florida State winning at home in 2011.

Florida State lost to the North Carolina State Wolfpack, 17–16. Florida State dominated the first half of the game, building a 16–0 lead by halftime. The Seminoles scored first with a 49-yard field goal from kicker Dustin Hopkins which put FSU up by three in the first quarter. They followed that up in the second quarter with a 4-yard touchdown pass from EJ Manuel to Nick O'Leary to give them a ten-point lead. Two more field goals, of 45 and 20 yards respectively, extended that lead to sixteen.

After controlling the first two quarters, the momentum shifted in the next two quarters as Florida State did not score in the second half. NC State scored their first points of the game with a 27-yard field goal. This was followed by a 24-yard touchdown pass from Mike Glennon to put the Wolfpack within six points. A subsequent drive by the Seminoles ended with a sack that put them out of field goal range. North Carolina State State blocked the punt and were able to score on a fourth down touchdown to give them the lead with just sixteen seconds remaining in the game. Florida State was unable to score on their next possession. The upset was the Seminoles' first loss of the season.

E.J. Manuel led the team in passing with 218 yards and one touchdown; Chris Thompson led the team in rushing with 25 carries for 141 yards; Rashad Greene led the team in receiving with 6 receptions for 60 yards. Dustin Hopkins successfully attempted three field goals. Despite losing, the Seminoles outgained NC State with 343 yards of offense in the game, with 125 rushing yards and 218 passing yards while holding the Wolfpack to 325 total yards of offense. The loss brought Florida State's all-time record against the Wolfpack to 22–11.

=== Boston College ===
Boston College at Florida State

Team	1	2	3	4	Total
Eagles	0	7	0	0	7
• Seminoles	14	17	10	10	51

- Date: October 13
- Location: Doak Campbell Stadium
  Tallahassee, FL
- Game start: 5:35 p.m. EST
- Elapsed time: 3:30
- Game attendance: 81,075
- Game weather: 84 °F (29 °C), Wind: NE 7mph, Partly Cloudy
- Referee: Pat Garvey, ACC; Jim Eckl (Umpire); John Busch (Linesman); Tommy Giles (Line judge); Tommy Pace (Back judge); Chris Junjulas (Field judge);; Eddie Bonet (Side judge); Rosie Amato (Scorer)
- TV announcers (ESPN2): Mark Jones (play-by-play), Brock Huard (color analyst), Maria Taylor (sideline)

Scoring summary
1	9:13	FSU	Kenny Shaw 77 yard pass from EJ Manuel (Dustin Hopkins kick)	FSU 7–0
1	4:53	FSU	Lonnie Pryor 2 yard run (Dustin Hopkins kick)	FSU 14–0
2	10:14	FSU	James Wilder, Jr. 7 yard pass from EJ Manuel (Dustin Hopkins kick)	FSU 21–0
2	7:27	FSU	Kelvin Benjamin 6 yard pass from EJ Manuel (Dustin Hopkins kick)	FSU 28–0
2	1:56	BC	Bobby Swigert 18 yard pass from Chase Rettig (Nate Freese kick)	FSU 28–7
2	00:00	FSU	Dustin Hopkins 51 yard field goal	FSU 31–7
3	11:45	FSU	Lonnie Pryor 3 yard run (Dustin Hopkins kick)	FSU 38–7
3	3:43	FSU	Dustin Hopkins 26 yard field goal	FSU 41–7
4	13:06	FSU	James Wilder, Jr. 12 yard pass from EJ Manuel (Dustin Hopkins kick)	FSU 48–7
4	6:53	FSU	Dustin Hopkins 38 yard field goal	FSU 51–7

After two straight road games, the Seminoles returned home to face the Boston College Eagles. Florida State won the game by a score of 38–7 in Chestnut Hill the previous season. Florida State has won the last two games in this series.

Florida State rebounded from a loss and defeated Boston College, 51–7. The Seminoles dominated the game from start to finish. They scored first early in the game with a 77-yard touchdown pass from EJ Manuel to Kenny Shaw. This was followed by a 2-yard touchdown run from Lonnie Pryor to give FSU a 14–0 lead at the end of the first quarter. Scoring was opened in the second quarter with a 7-yard touchdown run from James Wilder, Jr. on a pass from E.J. Manuel. They built a four possession lead with 6-yard touchdown pass from E.J. Manuel to Kelvin Benjamin. The Eagles got on the board with an 18-yard touchdown pass from Chase Rettig to Bobby Swiggert. Florida State extended the lead with a 51-yard field goal from kicker Dustin Hopkins, giving the Seminoles a twenty-four point lead at the half.

Florida State went on to control the second half of the game as well, holding Boston College scoreless in both the third and fourth quarters. In the third quarter, Florida State scored twice with a 3-yard touchdown run from Lonnie Pryor and a 26-yard field goal from Dustin Hopkins. Florida State scored two more times in the fourth quarter with a 12-yard touchdown pass from E.J. Manuel to James Wilder, Jr. and a 38-yard field goal from Dustin Hopkins.

E.J. Manuel had another career-best night with 439 passing yards becoming the first Florida State quarterback to have over 400 passing yards in one game since Chris Weinke in 2000. With this game, Dustin Hopkins became the all-time scoring leading at Florida State as well as in the Atlantic Coast Conference. E.J. Manuel led the team in passing with 439 yards and four touchdowns; Devonta Freeman led the team in rushing with 8 carries for 70 yards; Kenny Shaw led the team in receiving with 2 receptions for 125 yards and one touchdown. Dustin Hopkins successfully attempted three field goals. The Seminoles totaled 649 yards of offense in the game, with 201 rushing yards and 448 passing yards while holding the Eagles to 225 total yards of offense. The victory brought Florida State's all-time record against the Eagles to 7–4.

=== Miami (FL) ===
Florida State at Miami (Florida State–Miami football rivalry)

Team	1	2	3	4	Total
• Seminoles	3	10	3	17	33
Hurricanes	10	0	3	7	20

- Date: October 20
- Location: Sun Life Stadium
  Miami Gardens, FL
- Game start: 8:14 p.m. EST
- Elapsed time: 3:42
- Game attendance: 73,328
- Game weather: 79 °F (26 °C), Wind: ENE 9mph, Clear
- Referee: David Epperley, ACC; Michael Webster (Umpire); Joe Griesser (Linesman); Rick Page (Line judge); Pat Ryan (Back judge); Danny Short (Field judge); Mike Safrit (Side judge); K.C. Colebrook (Scorer)
- TV announcers (ABC): Brent Musburger (play-by-play), Kirk Herbstreit (color analyst), Heather Cox (sideline)

Scoring summary
1	11:06	MIA	Mike James 9 yard run (Jake Wieclaw kick)	MIA 7–0
1	7:32	MIA	Jake Wieclaw 19 yard field goal	MIA 10–0
1	1:00	FSU	Dustin Hopkins 33 yard field goal	MIA 10–3
2	9:14	FSU	James Wilder Jr. 17 yard run (Dustin Hopkins kick)	tied 10–10
2	00:03	FSU	Dustin Hopkins 46 yard field goal	FSU 13–10
3	6:07	FSU	Dustin Hopkins 35 yard field goal	FSU 16–10
3	00:19	MIA	Jake Wieclaw 27 yard field goal	FSU 16–13
4	11:53	FSU	Devonta Freeman 3 yard run (Dustin Hopkins kick)	FSU 23–13
4	6:13	FSU	Dustin Hopkins 48 yard field goal	FSU 26–13
4	2:45	FSU	Devonta Freeman 5 yard run (Dustin Hopkins kick)	FSU 33–13
4	00:47	MIA	Rashawn Scott 8 yard pass from Stephen Morris (Jake Wieclaw kick)	FSU 33–20

Florida State hit the road once again to face off against conference rival, the Miami Hurricanes. Florida State won the previous meeting between the two by a score of 23–19 in Tallahassee. The Seminoles have won three of the last four and three straight on the road against the Hurricanes.

Florida State beat Miami for a third straight time, 33–20. Miami struck first, scoring the first ten points of the game, the first seven off of a Florida State fumble and the other three on a botched punt. Florida State then went on to score 13 unanswered points in the first half, courtesy of a 33-yard field goal from Dustin Hopkins, a 17-yard run from James Wilder, Jr. to tie the game, and another 46-yard field goal as time expired. The Seminoles carried a three-point lead into halftime.

Florida State opened the second half with a 35-yard field goal to increase their lead to six. Miami responded with a 27-yard field goal of their own to cut the lead back down to three. The Seminoles then took control of the game in the fourth quarter with a 3-yard touchdown run from Devonta Freeman, a 48-yard field goal from Dustin Hopkins, and another 5-yard touchdown run from Devonta Freeman. The Hurricanes scored the final points of the game with an 8-yard touchdown pass from Stephen Morris to Rashawn Scott. Florida State got the ball back and ran the clock to maintain a thirteen-point win over their rival.

EJ Manuel led the team in passing with 229 yards; Devonta Freeman led the team in rushing with 10 carries for 70 yards and two touchdowns; Rashad Greene led the team in receiving with 7 receptions for 49 yards. Tyler Hunter recorded one interception. Dustin Hopkins successfully attempted four out of five field goals. The Seminoles totaled 447 yards of offense in the game, with 218 rushing yards and 229 passing yards while holding the Hurricanes to 258 total yards of offense. The victory brought Florida State's all-time record against the Hurricanes to 26–31.

Due to questionable calls, the officiating crew for this game was reprimanded by commissioner John Swofford and the head official was suspended for one game because of a failure to properly administer the 10-second runoff rule at the end of the first half.

=== Duke ===
Duke at Florida State
(Homecoming)

Team	1	2	3	4	Total
Blue Devils	0	7	0	0	7
• Seminoles	17	14	14	3	48

- Date: October 27
- Location: Doak Campbell Stadium
  Tallahassee, FL
- Game start: 3:36 p.m. EST
- Elapsed time: 3:05
- Game attendance: 71,467
- Game weather: 79 °F (26 °C), Wind: NW 14mph; gusts 15–20, Clear
- Referee: Gary Patterson, ACC; Rich McMahan (Umpire), John Busch (Linesman), Tommy Giles (Line judge), Doug Smith (Back judge), Chris Junjulas (Field judge), Eddie Bonet (Side judge), Frank Kosman (Scorer)
- TV announcers (ESPNU): Anish Shroff (play-by-play), Dan Hawkins (color analyst), Tom Luginbill (sideline)

Scoring summary
1	11:20	FSU	Rashad Greene 71 yard pass from EJ Manuel (Dustin Hopkins kick)	FSU 7–0
1	4:51	FSU	Tyler Hunter 75 yard punt return (Dustin Hopkins kick)	FSU 14–0
1	1:52	FSU	Dustin Hopkins 26 yard field goal	FSU 17–0
2	13:50	FSU	James Wilder Jr. 1 yard run (Dustin Hopkins kick)	FSU 24–0
2	11:09	FSU	Devonta Freeman 9 yard run (Dustin Hopkins kick)	FSU 31–0
2	4:25	DUKE	Jela Duncan 3 yard run (Ross Martin kick)	FSU 31–7
3	14:34	FSU	Devonta Freeman 14 yard run (Dustin Hopkins kick)	FSU 38–7
3	10:14	FSU	Kelvin Benjamin 35 yard pass from EJ Manuel (Dustin Hopkins kick)	FSU 45–7
4	9:40	FSU	Dustin Hopkins 56 yard field goal	FSU 48–7

After its trip to Miami, Florida State returned home for a homecoming game against the Duke Blue Devils. The Seminoles and the Blue Devils previously met last season in Durham where the Seminoles won by a score of 41–16. Duke has never defeated Florida State in football. As part of homecoming festivities, the Homecoming Chief and Princess were recognized along with alumni being honored.

Florida State kept their unbeaten streak against Duke going with a 48–7 win over the Blue Devils. Florida State led the game from start to finish. The first score came from a 13-yard touchdown pass from EJ Manuel to Rashad Greene to give the Seminoles the early lead. They then scored on a 75-yard punt returned for a touchdown by Tyler Hunter and then added to that lead with a 26-yard field goal from Dustin Hopkins. Florida State continued their control of the game in the second quarter with a 1-yard touchdown run from James Wilder, Jr. capping a three play drive and a 9-yard touchdown run from Devonta Freeman. Duke got on the board with their first score of the game courtesy of a 3-yard touchdown run from Jela Duncan. The Seminoles had a twenty-four point lead at the half.

Florida State dominated the second half by holding Duke scoreless. The Seminoles received the ball to open the half and took advantage by scoring a 14-yard touchdown run from Devonta Freeman. They scored again in the third quarter with a 35-yard touchdown pass to Kelvin Benjamin from E.J. Manuel. The last score of the game came from Dustin Hopkins who set a new career-long, first set in 2010, with a 56-yard field goal.

E.J. Manuel led the team in passing with 282 yards and two touchdowns; Devonta Freeman led the team in rushing with 12 carries for 104 yards and two touchdowns; Rodney Smith led the team in receiving with 3 receptions for 112 yards. On special teams, Tyler Hunter returned a punt for a touchdown and Dustin Hopkins successfully attempted two field goals, including the longest of his career. With this game, kicker Dustin Hopkins became the Atlantic Coast Conference career field goal leader and tied with Sebastian Janikowski for the second-longest kick in school history only trailing a 60-yard field goal from Gary Cismesia. The Seminoles totaled 560 yards of offense in the game, with 261 rushing yards and 299 passing yards while holding the Hurricanes to 232 total yards of offense. The victory brought Florida State's all-time record against the Blue Devils to 18–0.

=== Virginia Tech ===
Florida State at Virginia Tech

Team	1	2	3	4	Total
• Seminoles	3	10	7	8	28
Hokies	3	7	7	5	22

- Date: November 8
- Location: Lane Stadium
  Blacksburg, VA
- Game start: 7:32 p.m. EST
- Elapsed time: 3:30
- Game attendance: 65,632
- Game weather: 43 °F (6 °C), Wind: NW 4mph; wind chill of 37, gusts 15–20
- Referee: Ron Cherry, ACC; Tom Leverty (Umpire); Troy Gray (Linesman); Robert Zivkovic (Line judge); Barry Hendon (Back judge); Chris Brown (Field judge); Richard Wilborn (Side judge)
- TV announcers (ESPN): Rece Davis (play-by-play), David Pollack and Jesse Palmer (color analyst), Samantha Steele (sideline)

Scoring summary
1	10:57	FSU	Dustin Hopkins 52 yard field goal	FSU 3–0
1	7:29	VT	Cody Journell 35 yard field goal	tied 3–3
2	14:56	FSU	Dustin Hopkins 45 yard field goal	FSU 6–3
2	2:49	VT	Corey Fuller 4 yard pass from Logan Thomas (Cody Journell kick)	VT 10–6
2	00:48	FSU	Rashad Greene 25 yard pass from EJ Manuel (Dustin Hopkins kick)	FSU 13–10
3	6:56	FSU	Greg Dent 10 yard pass from EJ Manuel (Dustin Hopkins kick)	FSU 20–10
3	2:54	VT	Logan Thomas 5 yard run (Cody Journell kick)	FSU 20–17
4	6:59	VT	Penalty on Devonta Freeman in end zone/safety	FSU 20–19
4	2:19	VT	Cody Journell 21 yard field goal	VT 22–20
4	00:40	FSU	Rashad Greene 39 yard pass from EJ Manuel (EJ Manuel pass To Nick O'Leary for Two-Point Conversion)	FSU 28–22

Florida State had a bye before traveling to face the Virginia Tech Hokies in a Thursday night clash. Florida State and Virginia Tech had not met in the regular season since 2008, when the Seminoles defeated the Hokies 30–20 in Tallahassee. The teams previously met in the 2010 ACC Championship Game where Virginia Tech defeated Florida State 44–33. Coming into this game, Florida State had won thirteen of the last fifteen against Virginia Tech.

Florida State rallied to defeat Virginia Tech by a score of 28–22. Florida State opened the scoring with a 52-yard field goal from Dustin Hopkins to put the Seminoles up by three. Virginia Tech responded with a 35-yard field goal of their own to tie the game. In the second quarter, Florida State settled for another 45-yard field goal to once again give them a three-point lead. Late in the quarter, Virginia Tech took the lead for the first time with a 4-yard touchdown pass from Logan Thomas to Corey Fuller. The Seminoles scored again on a 25-yard touchdown pass from EJ Manuel to Rashad Greene to take back the lead. Florida State led by three points at the half.

Florida State struck first in the second half as well courtesy of a 10-yard touchdown from Greg Dent on a pass from E.J. Manuel to give the Seminoles their largest lead of the game. The Hokies then scored a touchdown of their own with a 5-yard run from Logan Thomas to get back within three. Florida State entered the final quarter with a slim lead. The lead slimmed even more as a penalty called on Devonta Freeman in the endzone resulted in a safety which cut the lead to one. The Hokies took the lead on a 21-yard touchdown run from Cody Journell with two minutes left. Trailing by two, the Seminoles, led by their quarterback, put together an 8-play, 68-yard game-winning drive that resulted in a 39-yard touchdown pass from E.J. Manuel to Rashad Greene and a subsequent two-point conversion. The drive gave Florida State a six-point lead with forty seconds left in the game. The game ended with Virginia Tech driving down the field with just seconds remaining on the clock. Tyler Hunter made a key interception in the red zone to prevent Tech from scoring and secure a victory for the Seminoles.

E.J. Manuel led the team in passing with 326 yards and three touchdowns while also recording one interception; Lonnie Pryor led the team in rushing with 5 carries for 22 yards; Rashad Greene led the team in receiving with 6 receptions for 125 yards and two touchdowns. On special teams, Dustin Hopkins successfully attempted two field goals. The Seminoles were outgained by the Hokies, totaling 311 yards of offense, with 326 passing yards but −15 rushing yards, while the Hokies had 385 total yards of offense although they were held to just 87 rushing yards . Florida State struggled mightily on rushing attempts throughout the game with the fourth worst rushing performance in school history. The victory brought Florida State's all-time record against the Hokies to 23–12–1.

=== Maryland ===
Florida State at Maryland

Team	1	2	3	4	Total
• Seminoles	14	13	7	7	41
Terrapins	0	0	7	7	14

- Date: November 17
- Location: Byrd Stadium
  College Park, MD
- Game start: 12:02 p.m. EST
- Elapsed time: 3:01
- Game attendance: 35,244
- Game weather: 52 °F (11 °C), Wind: S 7mph, Clear
- Referee: Tom Zimorski, ACC; Michael Webster (Umpire); Michael Kelley (Linesman); Tim Graham (Line judge); Delbert Bell (Back judge); Harris Tyson (Field judge); Angie Bartis (Side judge); Jon Stratton (Scorer)
- TV announcers (ESPNU): Tom Hart (play-by-play), John Congemi (color analyst)

Scoring summary
1	9:16	FSU	Devonta Freeman 5 yard run (Dustin Hopkins kick)	FSU 7–0
1	9:04	FSU	Nick O'Leary 10 yard pass from EJ Manuel (Dustin Hopkins kick)	FSU 14–0
2	14:51	FSU	Dustin Hopkins 26 yard field goal	FSU 17–0
2	11:05	FSU	Dustin Hopkins 40 yard field goal	FSU 20–0
2	1:32	FSU	Rashad Greene 30 yard pass from EJ Manuel (Dustin Hopkins kick)	FSU 27–0
3	10:27	MD	Kevin Dorsey 33 yard pass from Shawn Petty (Brad Craddock kick)	FSU 27–7
3	3:12	FSU	Devonta Freeman 2 yard run (Dustin Hopkins kick)	FSU 34–7
4	5:27	FSU	James Wilder Jr. 22 yard run (Dustin Hopkins kick)	FSU 41–7
4	00:25	MD	Kevin Dorsey 42 yard pass from Shawn Petty (Brad Craddock kick)	FSU 41–14

After its game against Virginia Tech, Florida State hit the road for the last time to play the Maryland Terrapins. Florida State won the last game played between the two by a score of 41–16 in Tallahassee.

Florida State ended conference play with a 41–14 win over the Terrapins. Florida State routed Maryland during the first half of the game. On their first possession, the Seminoles drove down the field and scored with a 5-yard touchdown run from Devonta Freeman. Immediately after, they capitalized on a Maryland fumble to go up by two scores with a 10-yard touchdown pass from EJ Manuel to Nick O'Leary. In the second quarter, Florida State extended their lead with two field goals from Dustin Hopkins, a 26-yard field goal and a 40-yard field goal, and a 30-yard touchdown pass to Rashad Greene from E.J. Manuel to make it a four score lead. The Seminoles led by twenty-seven points at halftime while the Terps remained scoreless at the half.

Maryland scored their first points of the game early in the third quarter with a 33-yard touchdown pass from Shawn Petty to Kevin Dorsey to cut the Seminole lead to twenty. Florida State responded with a 2-yard touchdown run from Devonta Freeman, his second touchdown of the day. Going into the fourth quarter, Florida State held a sizeable lead. The lead was extended courtesy of James Wilder, Jr. with a 22-yard touchdown run. Maryland's only other score came in the final seconds with another 42-yard touchdown pass from Shawn Petty to Kevin Dorsey following a State turnover.

E.J. Manuel led the team in passing with 144 yards and two touchdowns while also recording one interception, Clint Trickett also entered the game and recorded 16 yards; Devonta Freeman led the team in rushing with 16 carries for 148 yards and two touchdowns; Rashad Greene led the team in receiving with 4 receptions for 50 yards and one touchdown. On special teams, Dustin Hopkins successfully attempted two field goals, making him the all-time NCAA scoring leader with 448 points. The Seminoles totaled 397 yards of offense in the game, with 237 rushing yards and 160 passing yards, while holding the Terrapins to 170 total yards of offense. The victory brought Florida State's all-time record against the Terrapins to 21–2.

=== Florida ===
Florida at Florida State (Florida–Florida State football rivalry)

Team	1	2	3	4	Total
• Gators	3	10	0	24	37
Seminoles	0	3	17	6	26

- Date: November 24
- Location: Doak Campbell Stadium
  Tallahassee, FL
- Game start: 3:43 p.m. EST
- Elapsed time: 3:35
- Game attendance: 83,429
- Game weather: 66 °F (19 °C), Wind: NNW 10mph; gusts 17, Sunny
- Referee: Brad Allen, ACC; Jim Hyson (Umpire); Arthur Hardin (Linesman); Richard Misner (Line judge); Ron Boyd (Back judge); Mike Cullin (Field judge); Darrell Harriso (Side judge); Andrew Panucci (Scorer)
- TV announcers (ABC/Sun Sports): Brad Nessler (play-by-play), Todd Blackledge (color analyst), Holly Rowe (sideline)
  David Steele, Nat Moore, Casey Weldon, Brady Ackerman, Tom Block (Sun Sports crew)

Scoring summary
1	9:13	FLA	Caleb Sturgis 39 yard field goal	FLA 3–0
2	6:53	FLA	Caleb Sturgis 45 yard field goal	FLA 6–0
2	5:26	FLA	Mike Gillislee 9 yard run (Caleb Sturgis kick)	FLA 13–0
2	00:00	FSU	Dustin Hopkins 50 yard field goal	FLA 13–3
3	10:27	FSU	Nick O'Leary 6 yard pass from EJ Manuel (Dustin Hopkins kick)	FLA 13–10
3	8:30	FSU	EJ Manuel 1 yard run (Dustin Hopkins kick)	FSU 17–13
3	4:24	FSU	Dustin Hopkins 53 yard field goal	FSU 20–13
4	13:27	FLA	Caleb Sturgis 32 yard field goal	FSU 20–16
4	11:01	FLA	Mike Gillislee 37 yard run (Caleb Sturgis kick)	FLA 23–20
4	7:00	FLA	Quinton Dunbar 14 yard pass From Jeff Driskel (Caleb Sturgis kick)	FLA 30–20
4	2:33	FLA	Matt Jones 32 yard run (Caleb Sturgis kick)	FLA 37–20
4	00:00	FSU	EJ Manuel 22 yard run	FLA 37–26

Florida State returned home for their annual rivalry game with the Florida Gators in the regular season finale. Last season, Florida State was victorious with a 21–7 win over their rival in Gainesville. This was the second consecutive victory for the Seminoles after a win the previous season in Tallahassee that snapped a six-game losing streak to the Gators.

Florida State suffered their second loss of the season and ended the regular season with a 37–26 loss to Florida, their first loss in the series since 2009 and the first loss in the series for coach Jimbo Fisher. Florida State couldn't overcome a five turnover game, their worst ball protection performance so far. Florida scored first with a 39-yard field goal from Caleb Sturgis which was followed by another 45-yard field goal in the second quarter. The Gators then scored on a Florida State turnover with a 9-yard touchdown run from Mike Gillislee. The Seminoles got on the board at the end of the second quarter with 50-yard field goal from Dustin Hopkins. Florida held a ten-point lead at halftime, a half that included several turnovers from the Seminoles.

Florida State scored on their first possession of the second half with a 6-yard touchdown pass from E.J. Manuel to Nick O'Leary to bring the Seminoles within three of the Gators. They took the lead with a 1-yard touchdown run from Manuel following a Florida fumble. The lead was extended with a 53-yard field goal from Dustin Hopkins. Florida State held a seven-point lead heading into the final quarter. Florida pulled within four with a 32-yard field goal from Caleb Sturgis. The Gators then took the lead once again with a 37-yard touchdown run from Mike Gillislee. Their lead was extended courtesy of a 14-yard pass from Jeff Driskel to Quinton Dunbar and a 32-yard touchdown run from Matt Jones. Florida State didn't score again until the last seconds of the game with a 22-yard touchdown run from E.J. Manuel.

E.J. Manuel led the team in passing with 182 yards and one touchdown while also recording three interceptions, Clint Trickett also entered the game because of Manuel's injury and recorded 6 yards; E.J. Manuel also led the team in rushing with 12 carries for 54 yards and two touchdowns; Rashad Greene led the team in receiving with 5 receptions for 64 yards. On special teams, Dustin Hopkins successfully attempted two field goals. The Seminoles totaled 300 yards of offense in the game, with 112 rushing yards and 188 passing yards, and were outgained by the Gators who totaled 394 total yards of offense. The loss brought Florida State's all-time record against the Gators to 21–34–2 and 11–13–1 at Doak.

=== ACC Championship Game: Georgia Tech ===
Florida State vs Georgia Tech (ACC Championship Game)

Team	1	2	3	4	Total
• Seminoles	7	14	0	0	21
Yellow Jackets	0	6	3	6	15

- Date: December 1
- Location: Bank of America Stadium
  Charlotte, NC
- Game start: 8:02 p.m. EST
- Elapsed time: 3:11
- Game attendance: 64,778
- Game weather: 53 °F (12 °C), Wind: SE 3mph, Partly Cloudy
- Referee: Gary Patterson, ACC; Tom Laverty (Umpire); Matt Fitzgerald (Linesman); Colin Formulak (Line judge); Dale Shaw (Back judge); Mike Cullin (Field judge); Jim Coroira (Side judge); Greg Campbell (Scorer)
- TV announcers (ESPN): Brent Musburger (play-by-play), Kirk Herbstreit (color analyst), Heather Cox (sideline)

Scoring summary
1	10:45	FSU	Devonta Freeman 3 yard run (Dustin Hopkins kick)	FSU 7–0
2	13:54	FSU	James Wilder, Jr. 16 yard run (Dustin Hopkins kick)	FSU 14–0
2	9:25	GT	Chris Tanner 27 yard field goal	FSU 14–3
2	4:56	FSU	James Wilder, Jr. 1 yard run (Dustin Hopkins kick)	FSU 21–3
2	1:12	GT	David Scully 47 yard field goal	FSU 21–6
3	1:08	GT	Chris Tanner 36 yard field goal	FSU 21–9
4	6:27	GT	Tevin Washington 1 yard run (Two-Point Run Conversion Failed)	FSU 21–15

By virtue of winning the Atlantic Division, Florida State clinched a spot in the ACC Championship Game and played for the conference title in Charlotte. This is the Seminoles' third appearance in the conference championship game and their fourth division title. They have won the division title twice in the last three years. Florida State has a 1–1 record in this game.

Florida State faced the Coastal Division champion, the Georgia Tech Yellow Jackets. Georgia Tech was named champions of the Coastal Division due to Miami self imposing a post-season ban and North Carolina being under NCAA sanctions making both teams ineligible. These two teams last met during the 2009 season. In that meeting, the Yellow Jackets won 49–44 in Tallahassee. Georgia Tech has won two straight in the series, but Florida State has won eight of the last ten.

Florida State captured the ACC title with a 21–15 win over Georgia Tech. Florida State built up an early lead and never relinquished it. The Seminoles forced Georgia Tech to punt on the first possession of the game and then went on to score on their own first possession with a 3-yard touchdown run from Devonta Freeman. This was followed by a 16-yard touchdown run from James Wilder, Jr. in the second quarter. Georgia Tech put their first points on the board with a 27-yard field goal from Chris Turner to cut the Seminoles lead to eleven. Florida State scored again courtesy of another 1-yard touchdown run from James Wilder, Jr. Before halftime, Georgia Tech kicked a 47-yard field goal to give the Yellow Jackets three more points. The Seminoles went into the half with a 21–6 lead.

After dominating the first two quarters, Florida State was held scoreless during the last two quarters. Georgia Tech added more points in the third quarter with a 36-yard field goal from Chris Tanner and in the fourth quarter with a 1-yard touchdown run from Tevin Washington to pull them within six of the lead; a subsequent two-point conversion failed. Georgia Tech got the ball back and were driving down the field in the final minutes until Karlos Williams intercepted in Florida State territory, which enabled the Seminoles to take a knee and claim a win over the Yellow Jackets.

E.J. Manuel, who became just the seventh quarterback in school history to total over 3,000 yards, led the team in passing with 134 yards while recording one interception; James Wilder, Jr. led the team in rushing with 10 carries for 69 yards and two touchdowns; Rashad Greene led the team in receiving with 9 receptions for 82 yards. Rodney Smith tied the school record of 38 straight games with a reception. On special teams, no field goals were attempted and there were no punts returned for any touchdowns. James Wilder, Jr. was named the most-valuable player. With this game, FSU rushed for over 2,500 yards and passed for over 3,000 yards on the season, becoming only the second FSU team to accomplish this. The Seminoles totaled 328 yards of offense in the game, with 194 rushing yards and 134 passing yards, while holding the Yellow Jackets and their triple option to 301 total yards of offense. This game set a record for the Seminoles as they scored 36 rushing touchdowns which was a new school record, beating the previous record of 35 set in 1995. The victory brought Florida State's all-time record against the Yellow Jackets to 13–9–1 and also gave Florida State its first Atlantic Coast Conference title since the 2005 season, as well as its first BCS bid since that season.

=== Orange Bowl: Northern Illinois ===
Florida State vs Northern Illinois (Orange Bowl)

Team	1	2	3	4	Total
• Seminoles	7	7	3	14	31
Huskies	3	0	7	0	10

- Date: January 1
- Location: Sun Life Stadium
  Miami Gardens, FL
- Game start: 8:50 p.m. EST
- Elapsed time: 3:40
- Game attendance: 72,073
- Game weather: 70 °F (21 °C), Wind: E 2mph, Mostly Cloudy
- Referee: Matt Moore, SEC; T. Quick (Umpire); J, Crawford (Linesman); M. Shirey (Line judge); S. Patrick (Back judge); B. Parks (Field judge); C. Conley (Side judge); K. Colebrooke (Scorer)
- TV announcers (ESPN/ESPN Radio): Joe Tessitore (play-by-play), Matt Millen (color analyst), Maria Taylor (sideline)
  Radio: Bill Rosinski (play-by-play), David Norrie (color analyst), Joe Schad (reporter)

Scoring summary
1	5:28	FSU	Lonnie Pryor 60 yard run (Dustin Hopkins kick)	FSU 7–0
1	1:41	NIU	Mathew Sims 25 yard field goal	FSU 7–3
2	0:11	FSU	Rashad Greene 6 yard pass from EJ Manuel (Dustin Hopkins kick)	FSU 14–3
3	11:48	FSU	Dustin Hopkins 25 yard field goal	FSU 17–3
3	9:55	NIU	Martel Moore 11 yard pass from Jordan Lynch (Mathew Sims kick)	FSU 17–10
4	14:56	FSU	EJ Manuel 9 yard run (Dustin Hopkins kick)	FSU 24–10
4	10:33	FSU	Lonnie Pryor 37 yard run (Dustin Hopkins kick)	FSU 31–10

Florida State went to a bowl game for the 31st straight season, which is the current longest streak in the nation and the third longest streak in college football history. By virtue of winning the ACC championship, Florida State received an automatic bid to a BCS Bowl. This marks the Seminoles first BCS bowl appearance since the 2006 Orange Bowl, a game they lost in overtime. Florida State has a 1–5 record in BCS games and a 3–5 record in the Orange Bowl.

The Seminoles faced the Northern Illinois Huskies of the MAC. The Huskies received an automatic at-large bid because they finished ranked in the top 16 and ahead of an automatic qualifying conference champion, becoming the first non-automatic qualifying team to get a BCS bid with a loss. Florida State came into this game ranked thirteenth in the country, while Northern Illinois came into this game ranked sixteenth. Florida State was designated home team, while Northern Illinois was designated visiting team.

Florida State won its first Orange Bowl in twelve years with a 31–10 win over the Huskies of Northern Illinois. Florida State never trailed in the game. The Seminoles scored in the first quarter with a 60-yard touchdown run from eventual MVP Lonnie Pryor to give them an early seven to zero lead. Northern Illinois responded later in the first quarter with a 25-yard field goal from Matthew Sims to cut the lead to four. Late in the second quarter, Florida State built up their lead with a 6-yard touchdown pass from EJ Manuel to Rashad Greene. Florida State led by eleven at the half.

After halftime, Florida State made it a two possession game with a 25-yard field goal from Dustin Hopkins, making him the NCAA leader in field goals made with 88. The Huskies pulled to within one possession with an 11-yard touchdown pass from Jordan Lynch to Martel Moore. Going into the final quarter, the Seminoles held a seven-point lead. Florida State scored fourteen points in the fourth quarter courtesy of a 9-yard touchdown run from E.J. Manuel and a 37-yard touchdown run from Lonnie Pryor.

E.J. Manuel led the team in passing with 291 yards and a touchdown as he became just the second quarterback in college football history to 4–0 in bowl games throughout a career; Lonnie Pryor led the team in rushing with 5 carries for 134 yards and two touchdowns; Kenny Shaw led the team in receiving with 6 receptions for 61 yards. Dustin Hopkins successfully completed one out of two field goals. The Seminoles totaled 534 yards of offense in the game, with 243 rushing yards and 291 passing yards, while holding the Huskies to 259 total yards of offense. This game brought Florida State's record in BCS games to 2–5. It brought their record in the Orange Bowl to 4–5.

== Awards ==
- College Football Performance Award (Elite Specialist)

Dustin Hopkins

=== Watchlists ===
- Maxwell Award

EJ Manuel

- Johnny Unitas Golden Arm Award

E.J. Manuel

- Bednarik Award

Brandon Jenkins
Lamarcus Joyner
Xavier Rhodes

- Bronko Nagurski Trophy

Brandon Jenkins
Lamarcus Joyner
Xavier Rhodes
Bjoern Werner

- Lou Groza Award

Dustin Hopkins

- Outland Trophy

Brandon Jenkins
Lamarcus Joyner
Xavier Rhodes
Björn Werner

- Jim Thorpe Award

Lamarcus Joyner
Xavier Rhodes

- Lombardi Award

Brandon Jenkins
Bjoern Werner

- Butkus Award

Christian Jones
Nick Moody

- Biletnikoff Award

Willie Haulstead

- Davey O'Brien Award

E.J. Manuel

- Walter Camp Award

Brandon Jenkins

In addition to pre-season watchlists, four Florida State players were added to the lists after the season began:

- Chris Thompson (Maxwell Award)
- Bjoern Werner and Cornellius Carradine (Bednarik Award)
- E.J. Manuel (Manning Award, Walter Camp Player of the Year)

=== Finalists ===
- Davey O'Brien Award (semifinalist)

E.J. Manuel

- Maxwell Award (semifinalist)

E.J. Manuel

- Johnny Unitas Award (semifinalist)

E.J. Manuel

- Chuck Bednarik Award (semifinalist)

Bjoern Werner

- Lou Groza Award (semifinalist)

Dustin Hopkins

- Broyles Award (semifinalist)

Mark Stoops

- Wuerffel Trophy (finalist)

Dustin Hopkins

- Johnny Unitas Award (finalist)

E.J. Manuel

- Bronko Nagurski Trophy (finalist)

Bjoern Werner

- Lou Groza Award (finalist)

Dustin Hopkins

- Ted Hendricks Award (finalist)

Cornellius Carradine
Bjoern Werner

- Defensive coordinator of the Year (finalist)

Mark Stoops

- Bear Bryant Coach of the Year Award (finalist)

Jimbo Fisher

=== Honors ===
Björn Werner, Chris Thompson, Cornellius Carradine, EJ Manuel, Menelik Watson, Lamarcus Joyner, Dustin Hopkins, Telvin Smith, Christian Jones, Ronald Darby, and Rashad Greene have all been honored with ACC Player of the Week recognitions for their respective games.

==== All-ACC teams ====
Sixteen players from Florida State were voted on for All-ACC selections.

First Team Offense
Dustin Hopkins (K)

Second Team Offense
EJ Manuel (QB)
Chris Thompson (RB)
Cameron Erving (OT)
Tre' Jackson (OG)
Bryan Stork (C)

First Team Defense
Björn Werner (DE)
Cornellius Carradine (DE)
Xavier Rhodes (CB)
Lamarcus Joyner (S)

Second Team Defense
Everett Dawkins (DT)
Christian Jones (LB)

Honorable Mentions
Timmy Jernigan (DT)
Anthony McCloud (DT)
Menelik Watson (OT)
Vince Williams (LB)

===== Coaches All-ACC =====
Eighteen players from Florida State were voted on for Coaches All-ACC selections.

Second Team Offense
EJ Manuel (QB)
Chris Thompson (RB)
Tre' Jackson (G)
Bryan Stork (C)

Honorable Mentions (offense)
Rashad Greene (WR)
Nick O'Leary (TE)
Cameron Erving (T)
Menelik Watson (T)
Josue Matías (G)

First Team Defense
Cornellius Carradine (DE)
Björn Werner (DE)
Xavier Rhodes (CB)
Lamarcus Joyner (S)

Second Team Defense
Timmy Jernigan (DT)
Everett Dawkins (DT)
Christian Jones (LB)

Honorable Mentions (defense)
Anthony McCloud, Sr. (DT)

First Team Special teams
Dustin Hopkins (K)

Defensive player of the year
Bjoern Werner (DE)

Defensive rookie of the year
Ronald Darby (CB)

Coach of the Year Runner-Up
Jimbo Fisher

==== All-Americans ====
Four Florida State players have been honored with All-American selections.

- Björn Werner (consensus)
- Dustin Hopkins
- Rashad Greene
- Coenellius Carradine

==== Conference awards ====
- ACC Defensive Rookie of the Year

Ronald Darby

- ACC Defensive Player of the Year

Bjoern Werner

- Brian Piccolo Award

Chris Thompson

=== All-star games ===
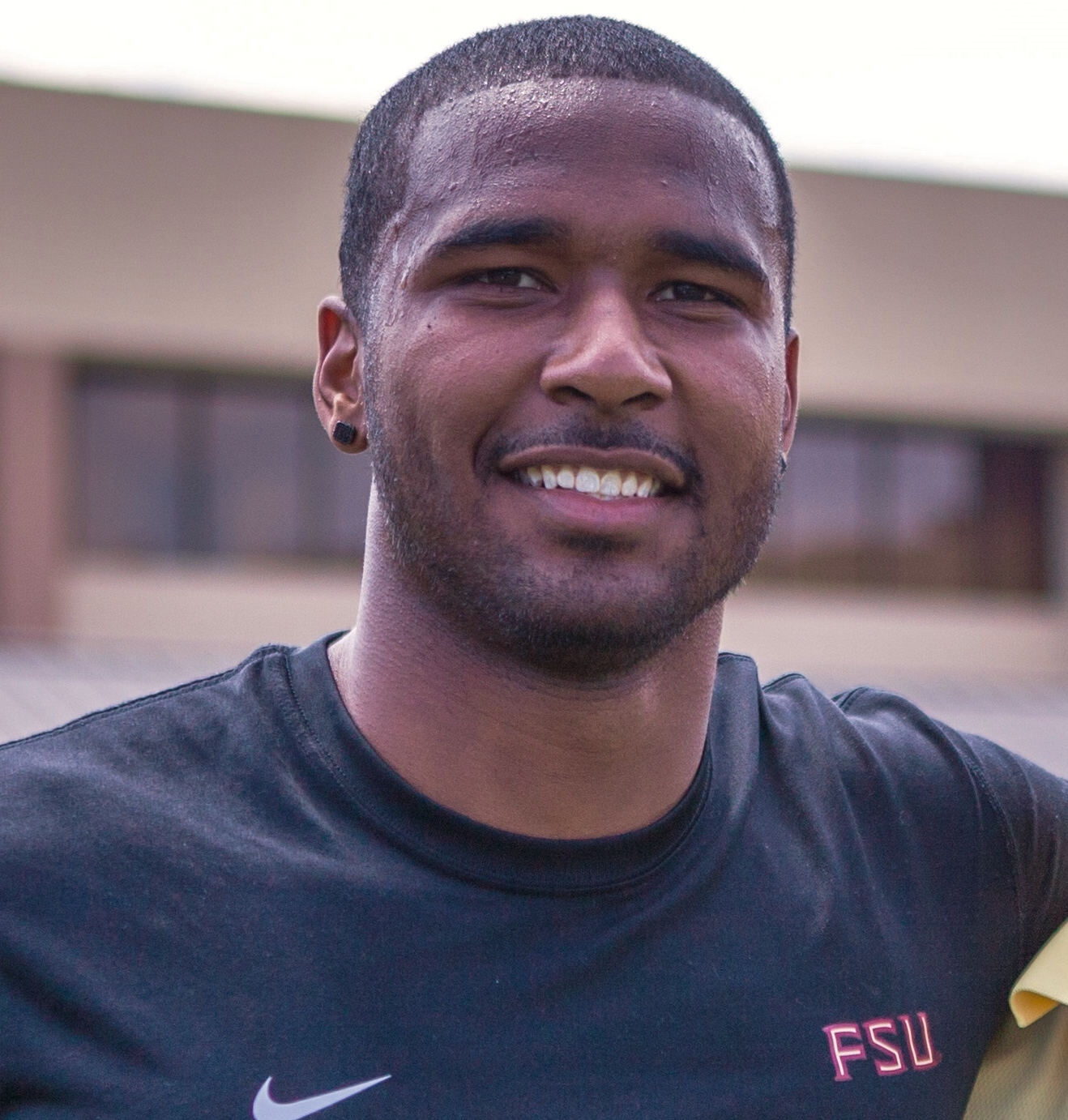
E.J. Manuel was named MVP of the Senior Bowl.

Game	Date	Site	Players
64th Senior Bowl	January 26, 2013	Ladd–Peebles Stadium, Mobile, Alabama	EJ Manuel, Dustin Hopkins, Everett Dawkins, Vince Williams

=== NFL draft ===
Eleven players were drafted in the 2013 NFL draft, which was the most for any university in the 2013 draft and the most in FSU history for a given year, besting the previous school record of 10 in 1995.

Three more players signed as free agents: Lonnie Pryor signed with the Jacksonville Jaguars while Rodney Smith and Anthony McCloud signed with the Minnesota Vikings.

Round	Pick	Overall	Name	Position	Team
1st	16	16	EJ Manuel	Quarterback	Buffalo Bills
1st	24	24	Björn Werner	Defensive end	Indianapolis Colts
1st	25	25	Xavier Rhodes	Cornerback	Minnesota Vikings
2nd	8	40	Cornelius Carradine	Defensive end	San Francisco 49ers
2nd	10	42	Menelik Watson	Offensive tackle	Oakland Raiders
5th	21	154	Chris Thompson	Running back	Washington Redskins
5th	29	162	Brandon Jenkins	Linebacker	Washington Redskins
6th	9	177	Dustin Hopkins	Placekicker	Buffalo Bills
6th	12	180	Nick Moody	Linebacker	San Francisco 49ers
6th	38	206	Vince Williams	Linebacker	Pittsburgh Steelers
7th	23	229	Everett Dawkins	Defensive tackle	Minnesota Vikings

== Roster ==
2012 Florida State Seminoles
Quarterback: 3 EJ Manuel – (redshirt) Senior; 5 Jameis Winston – Freshman; 9 Clint Trickett – (redshirt) Sophomore; 11 Sean Maguire – Freshman; 14 Jacob Coker – (redshirt) Freshman; Running back: 4 Chris Thompson – Senior; 7 Mario Pender – Freshman; 8 Devonta Freeman – Sophomore; 21 Debrale Smiley – (redshirt) Senior; 24 Lonnie Pryor – Senior; 32 James Wilder Jr. – Sophomore; 41 Chad Abram – Junior; Wide receiver: 1 Kelvin Benjamin – (redshirt) Freshman; 10 Marvin Bracy – Freshman; 12 Jarred Haggins – Junior; 15 Greg Dent – Junior; 19 Josh Gehres – (redshirt) Junior; 80 Rashad Greene – Sophomore; 81 Kenny Shaw – Junior; 82 Willie Haulstead – (redshirt) Junior; 84 Rodney Smith – Senior; 89 Christian Green – (redshirt) Sophomore; Tight end: 6 Dan Hicks – (redshirt) Junior; 33 Kevin Haplea – Junior; 35 Nick O'Leary – Sophomore; 44 Will Tye – (redshirt) Sophomore; 83 Christo Kourtzidis – Freshman	Offensive line: 51 Bobby Hart – Sophomore; 52 Bryan Stork – (redshirt) Junior; 53 Sterling Lovelady – Sophomore; 54 Tre' Jackson – Sophomore; 56 Trey Pettis – (redshirt) Freshman; 59 Henry Orelus – Junior; 60 Jacob Fahrenkrug – Senior; 62 Austin Barron – Sophomore; 65 Ruben Carter – (redshirt) Freshman; 67 Daniel Glauser – Senior; 70 Josue Matías – Sophomore; 71 Menelik Watson – Junior; 72 Daniel Foose – (redshirt) Sophomore; 75 Cameron Erving – (redshirt) Sophomore; 76 Garrett Faircloth – (redshirt) Junior; Defensive line: 4 Brandon Jenkins – Senior; 8 Timmy Jernigan – Sophomore; 15 Mario Edwards Jr. – Freshman; 21 Chris Casher – Freshman; 51 Giorgio Newberry – (redshirt) Freshman; 55 Jacobbi McDaniel – Senior; 56 Derrick Mitchell – (redshirt) Freshman; 81 Eddie Goldman – Freshman; 90 Moses McCray – (redshirt) Senior; 91 Cornellius Carradine – Senior; 92 Anthony McCloud – (redshirt) Senior; 93 Everett Dawkins – (redshirt) Senior; 94 Justin Shanks – Freshman; 95 Björn Werner – Junior; 96 Toshmon Stevens – (redshirt) Senior; 97 Demonte McAllister – (redshirt) Junior; 99 Nile Lawrence-Stample – (redshirt) Freshman	Linebacker: 7 Christian Jones – Junior; 10 Nick Moody – (redshirt) Senior; 11 Vince Williams – (redshirt) Senior; 16 Ukeme Eligwe – Freshman; 22 Telvin Smith – Junior; 24 Terrance Smith – (redshirt) Freshman; 28 Nigel Terrell – Sophomore; 29 Reggie Northrup – Freshman; Defensive back: 1 Tyler Hunter – Sophomore; 3 Justin Bright – (redshirt) Junior; 6 Nick Waisome – Sophomore; 9 Karlos Williams – Sophomore; 13 Ronald Darby – Freshman; 20 Lamarcus Joyner – Junior; 23 Gerald Demps – (redshirt) Junior; 26 P. J. Williams – Freshman; 27 Xavier Rhodes – Junior; 30 Colin Blake – Freshman; 31 Terrence Brooks – Junior; 37 Keelin Smith – Freshman; 42 Lamarcus Brutus – (redshirt) Freshman; Special teams: 18 Dustin Hopkins – Senior (K); 19 Roberto Aguayo – Freshman (K); 38 Cason Beatty – Freshman (P); 64 Dax Dellenbach – (redshirt) Senior (DS)

=== Depth chart ===
Defense

FS
Terrence Brooks
Karlos Williams
Gerald Demps

WLB	MLB	SLB
⋅	Telvin Smith	⋅
Nigel Terrell	Vince Williams	⋅
Matthew Thomas	⋅	⋅

SS
Lamarcus Joyner
Tyler Hunter
Lamarcus Brutus

CB
Xavier Rhodes
Keelin Smith
P.J. Williams

DE	DT	DT	DE
Brandon Jenkins	Everett Dawkins	Anthony McCloud	Björn Werner
Giorgio Newberry	Demonte McAllister	Timmy Jernigan	Cornellius Carradine
⋅	Nile Lawrence-Stample	⋅	Toshmon Stevens

CB
Nick Waisome
Tyler Hunter
Ronald Darby

Offense

WR
Rashad Greene
Kenny Shaw
Willie Haulstead

LT	LG	C	RG	RT
Cameron Erving	Josue Matías	Bryan Stork	Tre' Jackson	Menelik Watson
Daniel Glauser	Jacob Fahrenkrug	Austin Barron	Garrett Faircloth	Jonathan Wallace
⋅	⋅	⋅	⋅	⋅

TE
Nick O'Leary
Dan Hicks
Will Tye

WR
Rodney Smith
Greg Dent
Kelvin Benjamin

QB
EJ Manuel
Clint Trickett
Jacob Coker

RB
Chris Thompson
James Wilder, Jr.
Devonta Freeman

FB
Lonnie Pryor
Debrale Smiley
Chad Abram

Special teams
PK Dustin Hopkins
P Cason Beatty
P Dillon Kidd
KR Karlos Williams
Lamarcus Joyner
PR Rashad Greene
LS Chad Spinney
H Cason Beatty

=== Recruits ===
College recruiting
Name	Hometown	School	Height	Weight	40^{‡}	Commit date
Roberto Aguayo; K	Groveland, FL	South Lake HS	6 ft 0 in (1.83 m)	183 lb (83 kg)	N/A	Jan 31, 2011
Roberto Aguayo; K	Recruit ratings: Scout: Rivals: (78)					
Cason Beatty; K	Charlotte, NC	Olympic HS	6 ft 3 in (1.91 m)	215 lb (98 kg)	N/A	Jun 19, 2011
Cason Beatty; K	Recruit ratings: Scout: Rivals: (75)					
Colin Blake; DB	San Antonio, TX	Brandeis HS	6 ft 3 in (1.91 m)	180 lb (82 kg)	4.5	Feb 1, 2012
Colin Blake; DB	Recruit ratings: Scout: Rivals: (78)					
Marvin Bracy; WR	Orlando, FL	Boone HS	5 ft 10 in (1.78 m)	162 lb (73 kg)	N/A	Jul 14, 2011
Marvin Bracy; WR	Recruit ratings: Scout: Rivals: (81)					
Chris Casher; DE	Mobile, AL	Davidson HS	6 ft 4 in (1.93 m)	225 lb (102 kg)	N/A	Jan 5, 2011
Chris Casher; DE	Recruit ratings: Scout: Rivals: (83)					
Ronald Darby; DB	Oxon Hill, MD	Potomac HS	5 ft 11 in (1.80 m)	174 lb (79 kg)	4.3	Feb 1, 2012
Ronald Darby; DB	Recruit ratings: Scout: Rivals: (82)					
Mario Edwards Jr. DE	Denton, TX	Ryan HS	6 ft 4 in (1.93 m)	275 lb (125 kg)	4.8	Mar 15, 2011
Mario Edwards Jr. DE	Recruit ratings: Scout: Rivals: (90)					
Markuss Eligwe; LB	Stone Mountain, GA	Stone Mountain HS	6 ft 3 in (1.91 m)	210 lb (95 kg)	N/A	Apr 27, 2011
Markuss Eligwe; LB	Recruit ratings: Scout: Rivals: (80)					
Daniel Glauser; OL	Rheinfelden, Switzerland	New Mexico Military Institute	6 ft 6 in (1.98 m)	320 lb (150 kg)	5.2	Dec 4, 2011
Daniel Glauser; OL	Recruit ratings: Scout: Rivals: (JC)					
Eddie Goldman; DT	Washington, DC	Friendship Collegiate Academy	6 ft 4 in (1.93 m)	310 lb (140 kg)	5.05	Feb 1, 2012
Eddie Goldman; DT	Recruit ratings: Scout: Rivals: (85)					
Christo Kourtzidis; TE	Orange, CA	Lutheran HS	6 ft 4 in (1.93 m)	230 lb (100 kg)	N/A	Jun 18, 2011
Christo Kourtzidis; TE	Recruit ratings: Scout: Rivals: (78)					
Sean Maguire; QB	West Orange, NJ	Seton Hall Prep	6 ft 3 in (1.91 m)	200 lb (91 kg)	N/A	Jun 1, 2011
Sean Maguire; QB	Recruit ratings: Scout: Rivals: (80)					
Reggie Northrup; LB	Jacksonville, FL	First Coast HS	6 ft 2 in (1.88 m)	220 lb (100 kg)	4.6	Feb 1, 2012
Reggie Northrup; LB	Recruit ratings: Scout: Rivals: (79)					
Mario Pender; RB	Cape Coral, FL	Island Coast HS	6 ft 0 in (1.83 m)	185 lb (84 kg)	N/A	Oct 15, 2010
Mario Pender; RB	Recruit ratings: Scout: Rivals: (81)					
Justin Shanks; DT	Prattville, AL	Prattville HS	6 ft 3 in (1.91 m)	310 lb (140 kg)	N/A	Jul 27, 2011
Justin Shanks; DT	Recruit ratings: Scout: Rivals: (80)					
Dalvon Stuckey; DT	DeFuniak Springs, FL	Walton Senior HS	6 ft 3 in (1.91 m)	303 lb (137 kg)	N/A	Sep 11, 2010
Dalvon Stuckey; DT	Recruit ratings: Scout: Rivals: (79)					
Menelik Watson; OL	Manchester, England	Saddleback College	6 ft 6 in (1.98 m)	320 lb (150 kg)	N/A	Jan 25, 2012
Menelik Watson; OL	Recruit ratings: Scout: Rivals: (JC)					
P.J. Williams; DB	Ocala, FL	Vanguard HS	6 ft 1 in (1.85 m)	175 lb (79 kg)	N/A	Jul 24, 2010
P.J. Williams; DB	Recruit ratings: Scout: Rivals: (80)					
Jameis Winston; QB	Hueytown, AL	Hueytown HS	6 ft 4 in (1.93 m)	200 lb (91 kg)	N/A	Aug 3, 2011
Jameis Winston; QB	Recruit ratings: Scout: Rivals: (84)					
Overall recruit ranking: Scout: 5 Rivals: 6 ESPN: 3
‡ Refers to 40-yard dash; Note: In many cases, Scout, Rivals, 247Sports, On3, and ESPN may conflict in their listings of height, weight and 40 time.; In these cases, the average was taken. ESPN grades are on a 100-point scale.; Sources: "2012 Florida St. Football Commitment List". Rivals.; "2012 Florida State Commits". Scout.; "2012 Player Commitments – Florida State". ESPN.; "Scout.com Team Recruiting Rankings". Scout.; "2012 Team Ranking". Rivals.com.

==== Position key ====
Back	B	Center	C	Cornerback	CB	Defensive back	DB
Defensive end	DE	Defensive lineman	DL	Defensive tackle	DT	End	E
Fullback	FB	Guard	G	Halfback	HB	Kicker	K
Kickoff returner	KR	Offensive tackle	OT	Offensive lineman	OL	Linebacker	LB
Long snapper	LS	Punter	P	Punt returner	PR	Quarterback	QB
Running back	RB	Safety	S	Tight end	TE	Wide receiver	WR

== Statistics ==
=== Scores by quarter (all opponents) ===
	1	2	3	4	Total
Florida State	145	165	133	107	550
All opponents	36	47	47	76	206

=== Scores by quarter (ACC opponents) ===
	1	2	3	4	Total
Florida State	82	125	86	72	365
ACC opponents	30	41	36	72	179

=== Team statistics ===
Offense
Category	Number/per game
Points	39.3
Pass Attempts	30.6
Pass Completion Percent	67.3
Passing yards	265.3
Passing touchdowns	1.7
Rushing Attempts	36.6
Rushing yards	206.2
Rushing yards per attempt	5.6
Rushing touchdowns	2.9
Total Plays	67.2
Total yards	471.5
Average yards per play	7.0
First downs	23.0
Penalties	6.4
Turnovers	1.9

Defense
Category	Number/per game
Points	14.7
Pass Attempts	32.4
Pass Completion Percent	48.8
Passing yards	161.9
Passing touchdowns	0.9
Rushing Attempts	33.5
Rushing yards	92.3
Rushing yards per attempt	2.8
Rushing touchdowns	0.7
Total Plays	65.9
Total yards	254.1
Average yards per play	3.9
First downs	14.5
Penalties	4.9
Turnovers	1.5
