= Johnny Garrett =

Johnny Garrett may refer to:

- Johnny Frank Garrett, death row prisoner executed by the state of Texas
- Johnny Garrett (politician), member of the Tennessee House of Representatives

== See also ==
- John Garrett (disambiguation)
