= D. J. Eliot =

American football player and coach (born 1976)

Personal information
- Born: August 14, 1976 (age 50); Stillwater, Oklahoma, U.S.

Career information
- High school: Edmond Memorial (Edmond, Oklahoma)
- College: Wyoming (1996–1998)

Career history
- Wyoming (1999) Graduate assistant; Houston (2000–2001) Graduate assistant; Miami (FL) (2002) Graduate assistant; Texas State (2003) Defensive backs coach; Texas State (2004–2005) Linebackers coach; Tulsa (2006) Linebackers coach; Rice (2007–2009) Defensive line coach & recruiting coordinator; Florida State (2010–2012) Defensive ends coach; Kentucky (2013–2016) Defensive coordinator & linebackers coach; Colorado (2017–2018) Defensive coordinator & linebackers coach; Kansas (2019–2020) Defensive coordinator; Temple (2022) Defensive coordinator & outside linebackers coach; Philadelphia Eagles (2023) Linebackers coach; NC State (2025–2026) Defensive coordinator & linebackers coach

Darin "D. J." Eliot (born August 14, 1976) is an American football coach. He most recently served as the defensive coordinator and linebackers coach for the NC State Wolfpack, positions he held from 2025 to 2026. He previously served as the defensive coordinator and outside linebackers coach at Temple University and also served as an assistant coach at the University of Kansas, University of Colorado Boulder, University of Kentucky, Florida State University, Rice University, University of Tulsa, Texas State University, University of Miami, University of Houston and the University of Wyoming.

== Coaching career ==
=== Early career ===
Eliot began his coaching career at his alma mater, the University of Wyoming in 1999. He then served as a graduate assistant at University of Houston from 2000 to 2001 and at the University of Miami in 2002.

=== Texas State ===
In 2003, Eliot was hired as the defensive backs coach at Texas State University. In 2004, he became their linebackers coach.

=== Tulsa ===
In 2006, Eliot joined the University of Tulsa as their linebackers coach.

=== Rice ===
In 2007, Eliot was hired by Rice University as their defensive line coach and recruiting coordinator.

=== Florida State ===
In 2010, Eliot joined Florida State University as their defensive ends coach. During his time there, Eliot helped guide them to a win in the 2013 Orange Bowl.

=== Kentucky ===
In 2013, Eliot was hired as the defensive coordinator and linebackers coach at the University of Kentucky under head coach Mark Stoops.

=== Colorado ===
In 2017, Eliot joined the University of Colorado Boulder as their defensive coordinator and linebackers coach under head coach Mike MacIntyre.

=== Kansas ===
In 2019, Eliot was hired by the University of Kansas as their defensive coordinator.

=== Temple ===
In 2022, Eliot was hired as the defensive coordinator and outside linebackers coach at Temple University under head coach Stan Drayton.

=== Philadelphia Eagles ===
On March 9, 2023, Eliot was hired by the Philadelphia Eagles as their linebackers coach under head coach Nick Sirianni.

=== NC State ===
On December 30, 2024, Eliot was hired by NC State as their defensive coordinator and linebackers coach.

On October 25, 2026, Eliot was fired one day after the firing of head coach Dave Doeren.

== Personal life ==
Eliot and his wife, Miekel, have one son, Dawson, and three daughters, Drue, Page, and Reace.

Eliot’s daughter, Drue, was diagnosed with Ewing sarcoma, a rare bone cancer. She died of the disease in 2025.
