= List of Florida State Seminoles head football coaches =

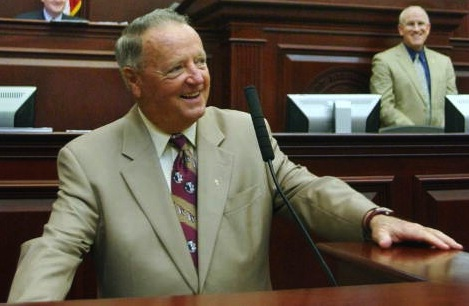
Bobby Bowden won 304 games during his 34 years as head coach at Florida State.

The Florida State Seminoles college football team represents the Florida State University in the Atlantic Coast Conference (ACC). The Seminoles compete as part of the NCAA Division I Football Bowl Subdivision. The program has had 13 head coaches, and one interim head coach, since it began play during the 1902 season. Since December 2019, Mike Norvell has served as head coach at Florida State.

Seven coaches have led Seminoles in postseason bowl games: Tom Nugent, Bill Peterson, Larry Jones, Bobby Bowden, Jimbo Fisher, Odell Haggins, and Norvell. Four of those coaches also won conference championships: Don Veller captured three as a member of the Dixie Conference; Bowden captured twelve, Fisher three, and Norvell one as a member of the Atlantic Coast Conference.

Bowden is the leader in overall wins and seasons coached with 304 wins during his 34 years as head coach. Fisher has the highest winning percentage at 0.783. Ed Williamson has the lowest winning percentage at 0.000. Of the 13 different head coaches who have led the Seminoles, Bowden and Darrell Mudra have been inducted into the College Football Hall of Fame.

== Key ==
Key to symbols in coaches list
General		Overall		Conference		Postseason (Note: Although the first Rose Bowl Game was played in 1902, it has been continuously played since the 1916 game, and is recognized as the oldest bowl game by the NCAA. "—" indicates any season prior to 1916 when postseason games were not played.)	
No.	Order of coaches (Note: A running total of the number of head coaches, with coaches who served separate tenures being counted only once. Interim head coaches are represented with "Int" and are not counted in the running total. "—" indicates the team played but either without a coach or no coach is on record. "X" indicates an interim year without play.)	GC	Games coached	CW	Conference wins	PW	Postseason wins
DC	Division championships	OW	Overall wins	CL	Conference losses	PL	Postseason losses
CC	Conference championships	OL	Overall losses	CT	Conference ties	PT	Postseason ties
NC	National championships	OT	Overall ties (Note: Overtime rules in college football were introduced in 1996, making ties impossible in the period since.)	C%	Conference winning percentage		
†	Elected to the College Football Hall of Fame	O%	Overall winning percentage (Note: When computing the win–loss percentage, a tie counts as half a win and half a loss.)				

== Coaches ==
List of head football coaches showing season(s) coached, overall records, conference records, postseason records, championships and selected awards (Note: Statistics correct as of the end of the 2025 NCAA Division I FBS football season.)
No.	Name	Season(s) (Note: Florida State did not field a team from the 1905–1946 seasons.)	GC	OW	OL	OT	O%	CW	CL	CT	C%	PW	PL	PT	CC	NC	Awards
1	W. W. Hughes	1902–1903	9	5	3	1	0.611	—	—	—	—	—	—	—	—	—	—
2	Jack Forsythe	1904	5	2	3	0	0.400	—	—	—	—	—	—	—	—	—	—
3	Ed Williamson	1947	5	0	5	0	.000	—	—	—	—	—	—	—	—	—	—
4	Don Veller	1948–1952	44	31	12	1	0.716	12	0	0	1.000	—	—	—	3	—	—
5	Tom Nugent	1953–1958	63	34	28	1	0.548	—	—	—	—	0	2	0	—	—	—
6	Perry Moss	1959	10	4	6	0	0.400	—	—	—	—	0	0	0	—	—	—
7	Bill Peterson	1960–1970	115	62	42	11	0.587	—	—	—	—	1	2	1	—	—	—
8	Larry Jones	1971–1973	34	15	19	0	0.441	—	—	—	—	0	1	0	—	—	—
9	Darrell Mudra^{†}	1974–1975	22	4	18	0	0.182	—	—	—	—	0	0	0	—	—	—
10	Bobby Bowden^{†}	1976–2009	405	304	97	4	0.756	105	27	0	0.795	21	9	1	12	2; 1993; 1999	Bobby Dodd COY (1980); Walter Camp COY (1991); ACC COY (1993, 1997)
11	Jimbo Fisher	2010–2017	106	83	23	—	0.783	48	16	—	0.750	5	2	—	3	1; 2013	—
Int.	Odell Haggins	2017; 2019	6	4	2	—	0.667	1	0	—	1.000	1	1	—	0	—	—
12	Willie Taggart	2018–2019	21	9	12	—	0.429	6	9	—	0.400	0	0	—	0	—	—
13	Mike Norvell	2020–2026	81	41	39	—	0.513	23	30	—	0.434	1	1	—	1	—	Bobby Dodd COY (2023); Paul "Bear" Bryant COY (2023; ACC COY (2023)
Int.	Rick Stockstill	2026	3	2	1	—	0.667	2	1	—	0.667						

== General managers ==
No.	Name	Year(s)
1	Darrick Yray	2022–2025
2	John Garrett	2026–present
