= 2013 Orange Bowl =

2013 Discover Orange Bowl
- BCS Bowl Game; 79th Orange Bowl
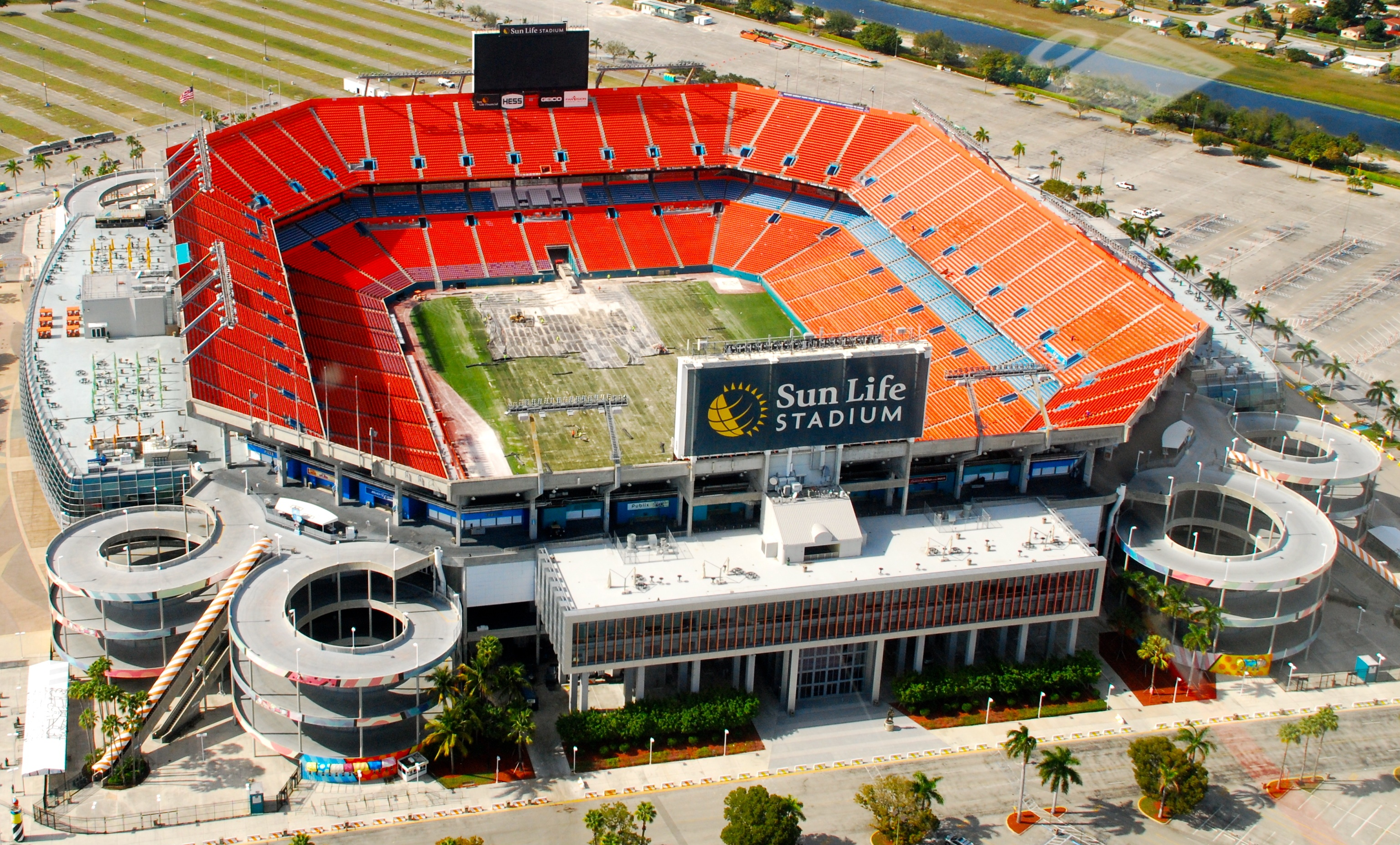
- Sun Life Stadium in Miami Gardens, Florida, hosted the Orange Bowl.
Northern Illinois Huskies	Florida State Seminoles
(12–1)	(11–2)
MAC	ACC
10	31
Head coach: Rod Carey (interim)	Head coach: Jimbo Fisher
AP / Coaches / BCS; 16 / 16 / 15	AP / Coaches / BCS; 13 / 12 / 12
	1	2	3	4	Total
Northern Illinois	3	0	7	0	10
Florida State	7	7	3	14	31
- Date: January 1, 2013
- Season: 2012
- Stadium: Sun Life Stadium
- Location: Miami Gardens, Florida
- MVP: Lonnie Pryor (FB - Florida State)
- Favorite: Florida St. by 14.5 (59)
- National anthem: Ayla Brown
- Referee: Matt Moore (SEC)
- Halftime show: Jake Owen
- Attendance: 72,073
- Payout: US$17,000,000 per team

United States TV coverage
- Network: ESPN, ESPN Deportes
- Announcers: ESPN: Joe Tessitore (Play-by-Play); Matt Millen (Analyst); Maria Taylor (Sidelines); ESPN Deportes: Eduardo Varela (Play-by-Play); Pablo Viruega (Analyst)
- Nielsen ratings: 6.5 (10 Million viewers)

The 2013 Discover Orange Bowl was a college football bowl game played on Tuesday, January 1, 2013, at Sun Life Stadium in Miami Gardens, Florida. The game was organized by the Orange Bowl committee. The Orange Bowl featured ACC champions Florida State versus at-large selection and MAC champions Northern Illinois. The game was part of the 2012–2013 Bowl Championship Series and was the second of the series to be played, following the 2013 Rose Bowl. Florida State won the game by a score of 31–10.

The Florida State Seminoles clinched a berth in the 2013 Orange Bowl by winning the 2012 ACC Championship. The Northern Illinois Huskies became the first MAC team to earn a BCS berth by being the 15th ranked team in the nation. A school from a BCS non-automatic qualifying conference earns a bid if in the top sixteen and ranked ahead of a champion from an automatic qualifying conference. The Huskies, winners of the 2012 MAC Championship Game, became the first—and, to date, only—team from the MAC to make a BCS bowl.

== Scoring summary ==
Scoring summary

Quarter	Time	Drive			Team	Scoring information	Score	
Quarter	Time	Plays	Yards	TOP	Team	Scoring information	NIU	FSU
1	5:28	4	95	1:11	FSU	Lonnie Pryor 60-yard touchdown run, Dustin Hopkins kick good	0	7
1	1:41	10	67	3:47	NIU	25-yard field goal by Mathew Sims	3	7
2	:11	10	82	3:46	FSU	Rashad Greene 6-yard touchdown reception from EJ Manuel, Dustin Hopkins kick good	3	14
3	11:48	9	68	3:12	FSU	25-yard field goal by Dustin Hopkins	3	17
3	9:55	6	87	1:53	NIU	Martel Moore 11-yard touchdown reception from Jordan Lynch, Mathew Sims kick good	10	17
4	14:56	8	61	3:17	FSU	EJ Manuel 9-yard touchdown run, Dustin Hopkins kick good	10	24
4	10:33	2	42	:42	FSU	Lonnie Pryor 37-yard touchdown run, Dustin Hopkins kick good	10	31
"TOP" = time of possession. For other American football terms, see Glossary of American football.							10	31

=== Statistics ===
Statistics	NIU	FSU
First downs	17	23
Total offense, plays – yards	73–259	75–534
Rushes-yards (net)	32–83	37–243
Passing yards (net)	176	291
Passes, Comp-Att-Int	15–41–1	26–38–0
Time of Possession	25:52	34:08
