= Brandon Jenkins (American football) =

American football player (born 1990)

No. 51
- Position: Linebacker

Personal information
- Born: February 9, 1990 (age 36); Tallahassee, Florida, U.S.
- Listed height: 6 ft 2 in (1.88 m)
- Listed weight: 251 lb (114 kg)

Career information
- High school: Florida State University School (Tallahassee, Florida)
- College: Florida State
- NFL draft: 2013: 5th round, 162nd overall pick

Career history
- Washington Redskins (2013)

Awards and highlights
- Second-team All-American (2010); First-team All-ACC (2010); Second-team All-ACC (2011)

Career NFL statistics
- Total tackles: 1
- Stats at Pro Football Reference

Brandon Jenkins (born February 9, 1990) is an American former professional football player who was a linebacker in the National Football League (NFL). He played college football for the Florida State Seminoles as a defensive end. The Washington Redskins selected him in the fifth round of the 2013 NFL draft.

== Early life ==
Jenkins attended the Florida State University School. Jenkins carried a four-star rating and was considered the No. 13 weakside defensive end in the nation by Rivals.com as a senior.

== College career ==
As a true freshman Jenkins played in 12 of 13 games after enrolling in January 2009. He had 12 total tackles and three tackles for loss, including one in the Seminoles' Gator Bowl victory over West Virginia.

Jenkins was selected as the most improved defensive lineman at the end of spring practice after establishing himself as the starter at right end.

As a true sophomore in 2010, Jenkins recorded 62 tackles, 13.5 sacks, and 21.5 tackles for loss and was named Team MVP, 1st team All ACC, and 2nd team All America according to Rivals.com and Scout.com. He had a career-high nine tackle performance, including 3.5 for loss and two sacks against Boston College. NFLdraftscout.com said Jenkins was considered one of the best defensive ends in the country and future high NFL draft pick until he got hurt.

== Professional career ==
Pre-draft measurables
Height	Weight	Arm length	Hand span	Wingspan	40-yard dash	10-yard split	20-yard split	20-yard shuttle	Three-cone drill	Bench press
6 ft 2 1/2 in (1.89 m)	251 lb (114 kg)	33 1/4 in (0.84 m)	9 1/4 in (0.23 m)	6 ft 8 5/8 in (2.05 m)	5.07 s	1.78 s	2.84 s	4.48 s	7.40 s	19 reps
All values from NFL Combine/Pro Day

Jenkins was selected by the Washington Redskins in the fifth round, with the 162nd overall pick, of the 2013 NFL draft with the draft pick Washington received in exchange for defensive tackle Albert Haynesworth. He signed a four-year contract in May 2013 that counted roughly $449,125 against the Redskins 2013 salary cap number.

On July 27, 2014, the Redskins waived Jenkins.
