= Lonnie Pryor =

American football player (born 1990)

No. 34
- Position: Fullback

Personal information
- Born: February 2, 1990 (age 36); Okeechobee, Florida, U.S.
- Listed height: 6 ft 0 in (1.83 m)
- Listed weight: 227 lb (103 kg)

Career information
- High school: Okeechobee
- College: Florida State
- NFL draft: 2013: undrafted

Career history
- Jacksonville Jaguars (2013)*; Tampa Bay Buccaneers (2013); Buffalo Bills (2014)*
- * Offseason or practice squad member only

Awards and highlights
- 2013 Orange Bowl MVP
- Stats at Pro Football Reference

Lonnie Pryor (born February 2, 1990) is an American former professional football player who was a fullback in the National Football League (NFL). He played college football for the Florida State Seminoles and was signed as an undrafted free agent by the Jacksonville Jaguars in 2013.

== Professional career ==
=== Jacksonville Jaguars ===
After not being drafted in the 2013 NFL draft, Pryor signed with the Jacksonville Jaguars as an undrafted free agent. He was released on September 1, 2013, and signed to the team's practice squad on September 2.

=== Tampa Bay Buccaneers ===
The Tampa Bay Buccaneers signed Pryor off the Jaguars practice squad on November 19, 2013. The Buccaneers released Pryor on August 29, 2014.
