= James Wilder Jr. =

American football player (born 1992)

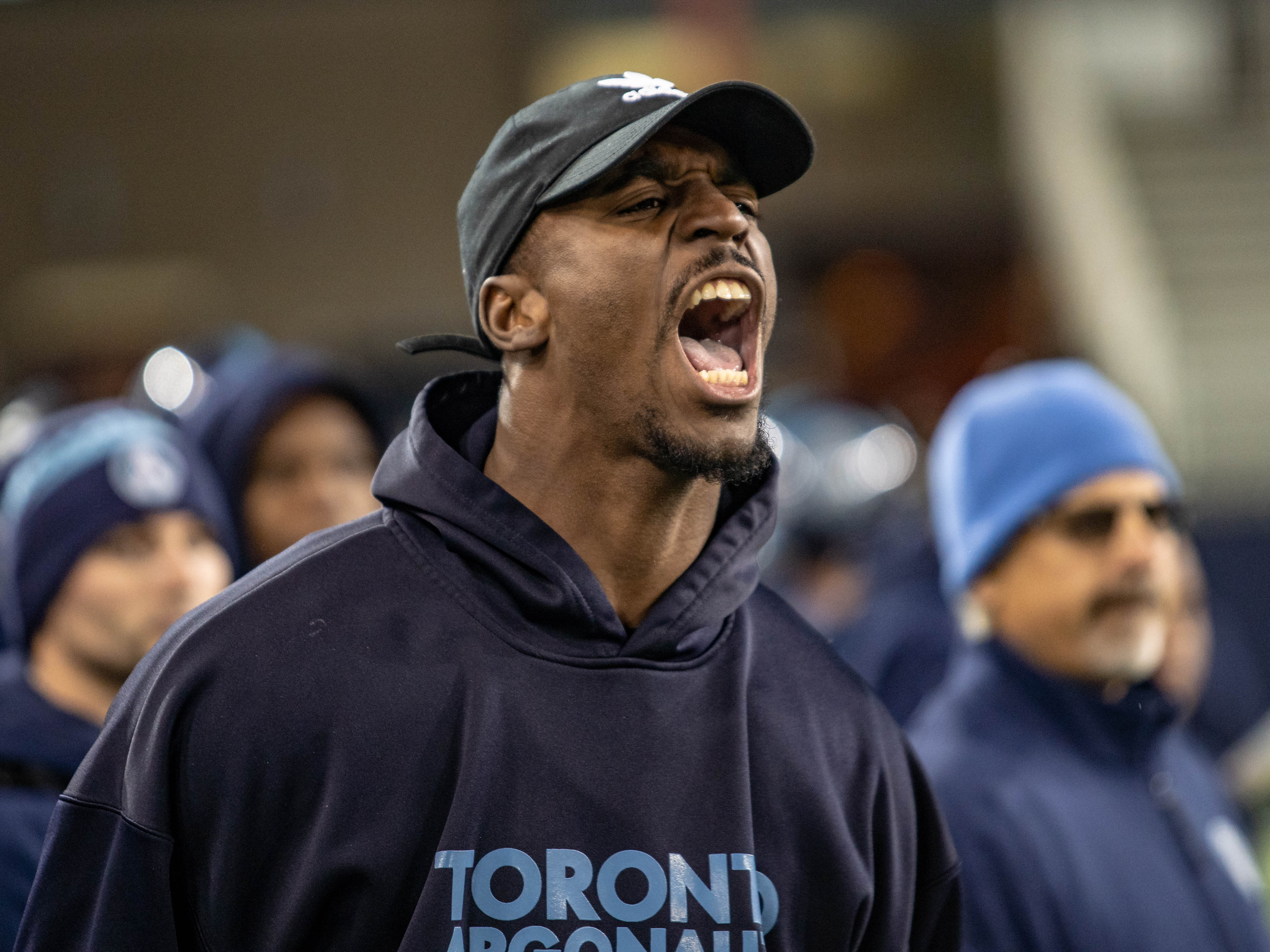
- Wilder yells during a 2018 regular season game

Profile
- Position: Running back

Personal information
- Born: April 14, 1992 (age 34); Tampa, Florida, U.S.
- Listed height: 6 ft 3 in (1.91 m)
- Listed weight: 232 lb (105 kg)

Career information
- High school: Henry B. Plant (Tampa)
- College: Florida State
- NFL draft: 2014: undrafted

Career history
- Cincinnati Bengals (2014–2015)*; Buffalo Bills (2016); Toronto Argonauts (2017–2019); Montreal Alouettes (2020)*; Edmonton Elks (2021–2022)
- * Offseason or practice squad member only

Awards and highlights
- Grey Cup champion (2017); CFL's Most Outstanding Rookie Award (2017); Frank M. Gibson Trophy (2017); BCS national champion (2013)

Career CFL statistics
- Rushing attempts: 502
- Rushing yards: 2,793
- Rushing touchdowns: 11
- Receptions: 182
- Receiving yards: 1,713
- Stats at CFL.ca
- Stats at Pro Football Reference

James Curtis Wilder Jr. (born April 14, 1992) is an American former professional football player who was a running back for five seasons in the Canadian Football League (CFL) with the Toronto Argonauts and Edmonton Elks, winning the Grey Cup in 2017 and the CFL's Most Outstanding Rookie Award for 2017. Wilder played college football for the Florida State Seminoles, where he was part of the team that won the 2014 BCS National Championship Game. He was also a member of the Cincinnati Bengals, Buffalo Bills, and Montreal Alouettes but did not appear in any games for those teams.

== Early life ==
He attended Henry B. Plant High School in Tampa, Florida. Wilder was considered the No. 1 athlete recruit in the nation in his class by Rivals.com.

In 2009, Wilder ran for 1,004 yards and 15 touchdowns, while registering 136 tackles (66 solo) and 19 quarterback sacks on defense. He was named the High School Junior of the Year by Rivals.com, as well as 2009 USA Today All-American. Wilder was selected to play in the 2011 U.S. Army All-American Bowl.

== College career ==
Wilder attended Florida State University from 2011 to 2013. He selected Florida State over the University of Florida and the University of Georgia. In 2012, Wilder had a breakout season, running for 635 rushing yards (5.8 yards per carry) and 13 touchdowns. Wilder won Offensive MVP for the 2012 ACC Championship Game. In 2013, Wilder averaged 7 yards per carry. Wilder was named All-ACC Honorable Mention.

Wilder rushed for 1,363 yards with 20 rushing touchdowns during his career at Florida State University. He entered the 2014 NFL draft after his junior season.

== Professional career ==
Pre-draft measurables
Height	Weight	Arm length	Hand span	40-yard dash	10-yard split	20-yard split	20-yard shuttle	Three-cone drill	Vertical jump	Broad jump	Bench press
6 ft 2 5/8 in (1.90 m)	232 lb (105 kg)	32 in (0.81 m)	9 3/4 in (0.25 m)	4.65 s	1.68 s	2.68 s	4.24 s	6.92 s	35 in (0.89 m)	10 ft 1 in (3.07 m)	18 reps
All values from NFL Combine, 40-yard dash from Pro Day

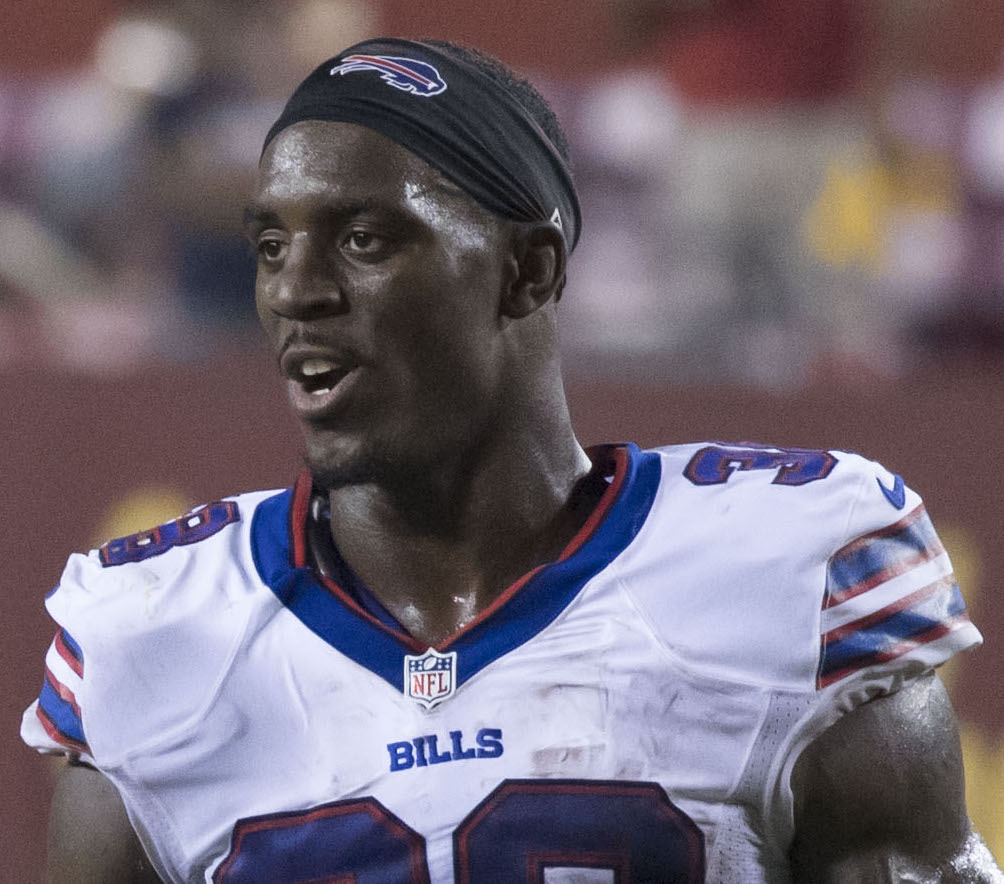
Wilder with the Buffalo Bills in 2016

=== Cincinnati Bengals ===
On May 12, 2014, Wilder was signed as an undrafted free agent by the Cincinnati Bengals. On August 30, 2014, he was waived by the Bengals. He was signed to the Bengals' practice squad after clearing waivers. On January 14, 2015, Wilder signed a reserve/future contract with the Bengals. On September 5, 2015, he was waived by the Bengals. On the following day, he was signed to the Bengals' practice squad.

=== Buffalo Bills ===
On January 20, 2016, Wilder signed a reserve/future contract with the Buffalo Bills. On September 2, 2016, he was waived/injured by the Bills. He was then placed on injured reserve. He was released by the Bills on September 27, 2016.

=== Toronto Argonauts ===
Wilder signed with the Toronto Argonauts on March 14, 2017, reuniting head coach Marc Trestman with the family, as Trestman was a former Tampa Bay Buccaneers assistant coach when Wilder's father was a running back on the team. Following an injury to starting running back Brandon Whittaker, Wilder made his first professional start on July 24, 2017, against the Ottawa Redblacks. Wilder took over the starting running back role in September, earning consecutive player of week honors in weeks 13 and 14, gaining 257 and 218 yards from scrimmage in each game, respectively. He amassed 872 yards and 5 touchdowns on 122 carries, as well as 467 yards on 51 catches, and was named the CFL's Most Outstanding Rookie on November 23, 2017. While largely contained in both playoff games the Argonauts played in, Wilder rushed for a touchdown in the final game of the year, helping Toronto secure a Grey Cup championship.

In late January 2018 Wilder announced that he was planning to sit out of the Argos' 2018 season in the hopes of pursuing a return to the NFL in 2019. Wilder noted that his current contract of $56,000 (around US$45,000) in 2018, combined with the risk of career ending injury, does not give his family comfort about the future were he to play in 2018. The Argonauts issued a statement in response to Wilder's comments, stating their expectations of him to fulfill his contractual agreement with the organization. Failure to report to the team in due course will likely result in him being placed on the team's suspended list for his decision as per his contractual commitments with the organization. By February 27, 2018, the Argos had reportedly offered Wilder a contract extension which would make him one of the highest-paid running backs in the league. On March 3, 2018, the Argos and Wilder agreed to a two-year contract extension, keeping him in Toronto through the 2019 season. The deal is reportedly worth $100,000 per year, with no signing bonus. Wilder played in the first 13 games of the season for the Argos, before suffering a leg injury in Week 16.

Wilder, who began the 2019 season as the Argos' starting running back, was listed as a healthy-scratch by the Argos during the team's August 16, 2019 loss to the Eskimos: The loss pushed the Argos record to 1–7. He finished the 2019 season playing in 14 games, rushing 92 times for 464 yards and one touchdown and catching 47 passes for 415 receiving yards and four touchdowns. Prior to entering free agency, Wilder was released upon his request on November 25, 2019.

=== Montreal Alouettes ===
On January 30, 2020, Wilder signed a one-year contract with the Montreal Alouettes. It was a self-negotiated contract, reportedly for $90,000. In late June 2020, at age 28, due to uncertainty over the 2020 CFL season amid the COVID-19 pandemic, he announced his retirement from playing before being able to play a game with Montreal; he had already received a $25,000 signing bonus from his contract. He accepted a coaching position at his former high school in Tampa, Florida.

=== Edmonton Elks ===
On February 9, 2021, Wilder came out of retirement to sign a one-year contract with the Edmonton Elks. Wilder played in 12 games for the Elks in 2021, serving as the team's starting running back carrying the ball 142 times for 770 yards and two touchdowns. He also caught 28 passes for 226 yards and one receiving touchdown. On January 24, 2022, Wilder and the Elks agreed to a one-year contract extension. Wilder played in only three games during the 2022 season as his season was cut short by a neck injury which will require surgery in order to play professional football again. On March 29, 2023, the Elks released Wilder.

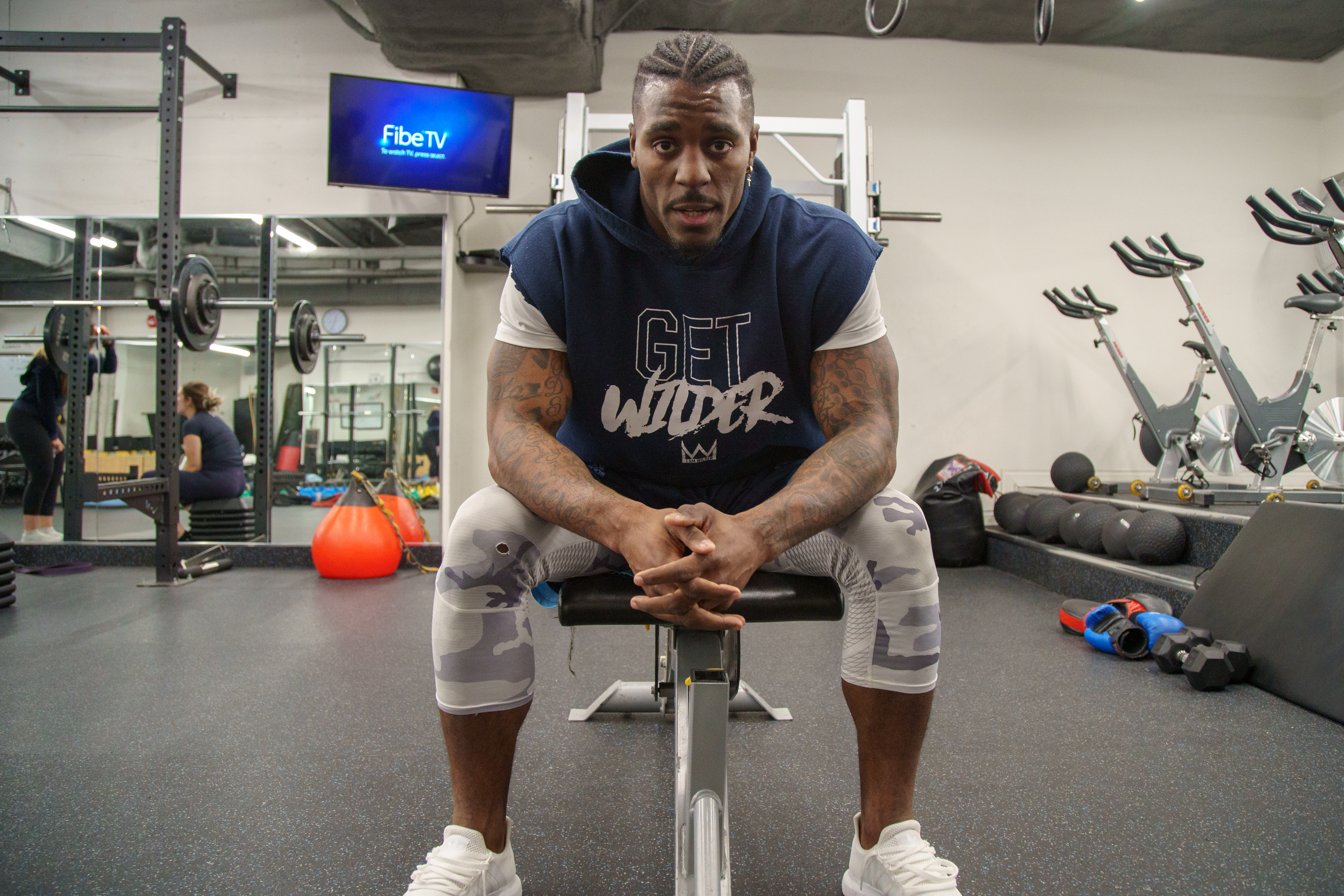
Wilder wears his signature "Get Wilder" hoodie at Sweatshoppe TO.

== Personal ==
His father James Wilder Sr. was an NFL running back for the Tampa Bay Buccaneers. In January 2014, James Wilder launched his clothing line, I Am Wilder Apparel. Wilder Jr. and Wilder Sr. also announced that they would be opening and lending their names to a training facility in Tampa Bay, which helped prompt Wilder's initial retirement, stating, "I have a lot of tread on the tires, but it's a decision I have to make right now."

Wilder has also participated in activism. He was a frequent protester in Houston during Black Lives Matter demonstrations following the murder of George Floyd. Wilder also started the #RunWILDERForACure hashtag once he assumed the starting tailback role in 2017, challenging other CFL running backs to donate a dollar for every yard they gained and $100 for each touchdown they scored towards breast cancer research. Several NFL rushers also joined in the initiative. He was previously the head football coach at Chamberlain High School in Tampa.
