= Björn Werner =

German American football player (born 1990)

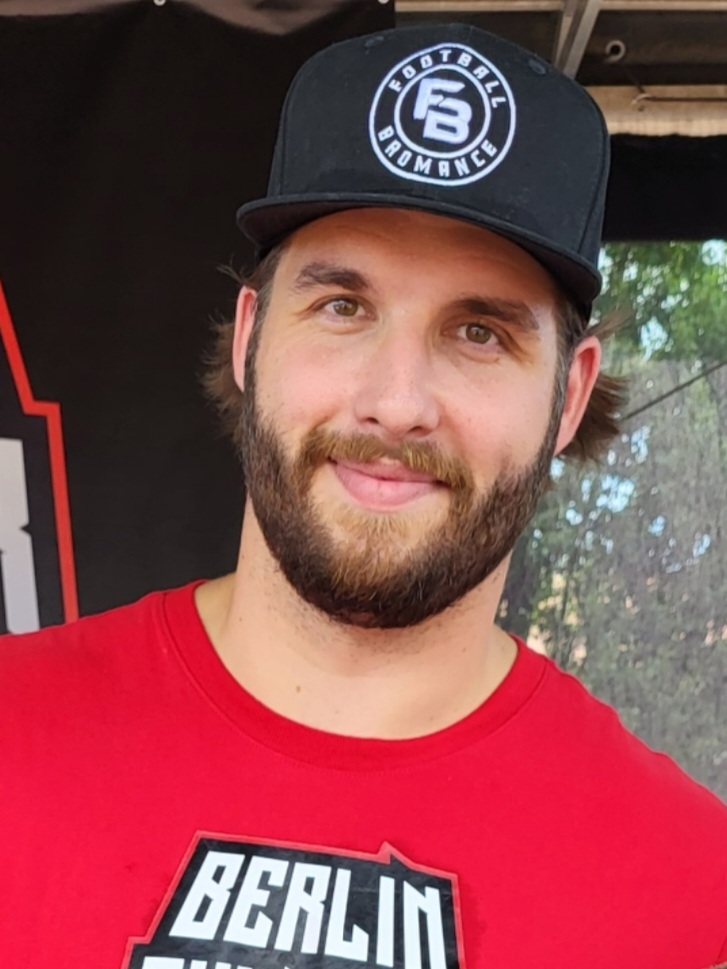
- Werner in 2022

Berlin Thunder (ELF)
- Title: Co-owner and sports director

Personal information
- Born: August 30, 1990 (age 36); Berlin, Germany
- Listed height: 6 ft 3 in (1.91 m)
- Listed weight: 255 lb (116 kg)

Career information
- High school: Salisbury School (Salisbury, Connecticut, U.S.)
- College: Florida State (2010–2012)
- NFL draft: 2013: 1st round, 24th overall pick

Career history

Playing
- Indianapolis Colts (2013–2015); Jacksonville Jaguars (2016)*
- * Offseason or practice squad member only

Operations
- Berlin Thunder (2021–2024) Co-owner and sports director

Awards and highlights
- Unanimous All-American (2012); ACC Defensive Player of the Year (2012); First-team All-ACC (2012)

Career NFL statistics
- Total tackles: 81
- Sacks: 6.5
- Forced fumbles: 1
- Fumble recoveries: 2
- Stats at Pro Football Reference

Björn Werner (German pronunciation: [bjœʁn ˈvɛʁnɐ]; born August 30, 1990) is a German former professional player of American football who was a defensive end for the Indianapolis Colts of the National Football League (NFL). He played college football for the Florida State Seminoles, earning unanimous All-American honors in 2012. Werner was selected by the Indianapolis Colts in the first round of the 2013 NFL draft. He was a co-owner and sports director of the Berlin Thunder of the European League of Football (ELF) from 2021 to 2024.

== Early life ==
Werner grew up in the Berlin neighborhoods of Wedding and Reinickendorf. He originally played for the Berlin Adler, before attending Salisbury School in Salisbury, Connecticut, as an exchange student in 2007, as part of an exchange program organized by Pat Steenberge. He had 54 tackles, including 24 for losses, 12 sacks and two fumble recoveries in just eight games, but returned to Germany for his junior year. In 2008, he played on the U-19 Germany national team against the Poland U-19 squad in Będzin, winning 67–0. In 2009, Werner returned to Salisbury, and logged 57 tackles in seven games with three sacks, four forced fumbles and two blocked field goals as a senior.

Despite having played high school football for only two years, Werner was regarded a three-star recruit and ranked the fifth overall prospect in the state of Connecticut by Rivals.com. Werner chose FSU over Oregon, University of Miami, and California, during a National Signing Day telecast on ESPN.

Over spring break 2010, Werner married his girlfriend Denise, whom he had met in tenth grade in Berlin.

== College career ==
Werner enrolled in Florida State University in Tallahassee, Florida, where he was a member of coach Jimbo Fisher's Florida State Seminoles football team from 2010 through 2012. He appeared in all 14 games as a true freshman, registering 20 tackles, including 6.0 tackles for loss and 3.5 sacks, as a backup of senior defensive end Markus White. In his sophomore season, he took over as starter at left defensive end, registered 37 tackles, including 25 solo stops, 11 tackles for loss and 7 sacks for a Florida State defense that ranked second in rushing defense, fourth in scoring defense and sixth in total defense. In his junior season, he had his best collegiate season. He registered 42 tackles, 30 solo stops, 18 tackles for loss and 13 sacks. He was voted the 2012 Defensive Player of the Year.

== Professional career ==
=== Pre-draft ===
In preseason mock drafts from May 2012, Werner was listed as a late first-rounder for the 2013 NFL draft. By mid-season, he had moved up to a top-3 spot. The Seminoles had not seen one of their players selected in the top-3 since Andre Wadsworth in 1998. On January 3, 2013, Werner announced his decision to enter the 2013 NFL draft. He signed with agent Jimmy Sexton of Creative Artists Agency.

Pre-draft measurables
Height	Weight	Arm length	Hand span	40-yard dash	10-yard split	20-yard split	20-yard shuttle	Three-cone drill	Vertical jump	Broad jump	Bench press
6 ft 3 1/4 in (1.91 m)	266 lb (121 kg)	33 1/4 in (0.84 m)	9 5/8 in (0.24 m)	4.83 s	1.69 s	2.81 s	4.40 s	7.30 s	31.0 in (0.79 m)	9 ft 3 in (2.82 m)	25 reps
All values from NFL Combine

=== Indianapolis Colts ===
==== 2013 season ====
In the 2013 NFL Draft, the Indianapolis Colts selected him in the first round, 24th overall.

On July 24, 2013, Werner signed a four-year contract worth $7.9 million featuring a $4.12 million signing bonus. On September 8, 2013, Werner played his first NFL game. During a 21-17 win over the Oakland Raiders, Werner made also his first tackle. In week 15, Werner had his first sack in the NFL against the Houston Texans. During the season, Werner played in 13 games making 18 tackles with 4 passes defended and 2.5 sacks. Werner entered the playoffs with the Colts and played in both of the Colts' playoff games: their Wild Card win over the Kansas City Chiefs and their Divisional Round loss to the New England Patriots.

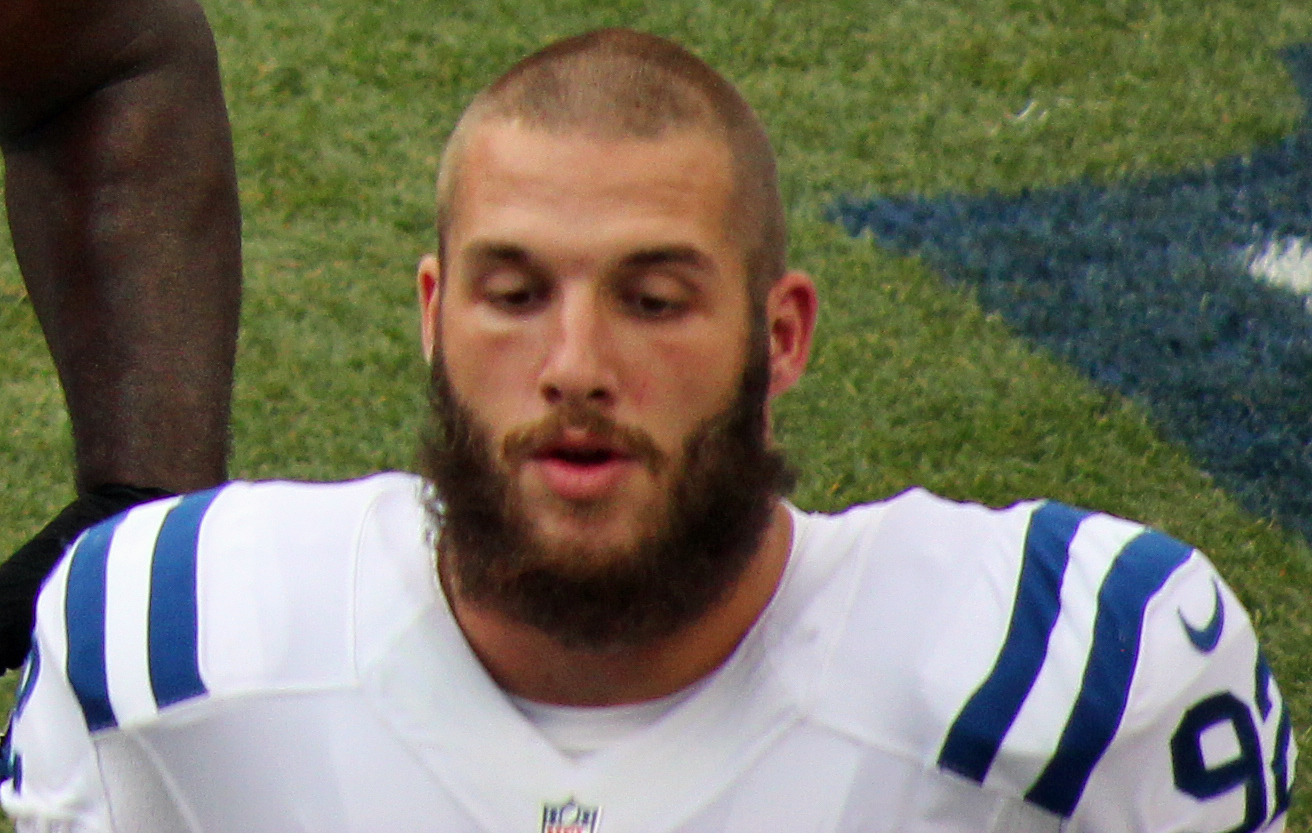
Werner with the Colts in 2014

==== 2014 season ====
Werner had 3 tackles in a Week 1 loss against the Denver Broncos. He had his first career two-sack game against the Baltimore Ravens in Week 5. After Week 7, however, his only stat other than tackles was a pass defensed in Week 16 against the Dallas Cowboys. Although he was active for the Colts' playoff wins over the Cincinnati Bengals and Denver Broncos, he was inactive for their AFC Championship Game loss to the New England Patriots.

==== 2015 season ====
Werner appeared in 10 games during the 2015 season, making 13 combined tackles. On March 8, 2016, he was waived by the Colts.

=== Jacksonville Jaguars ===
Werner signed with the Jacksonville Jaguars on May 11, 2016. He was released on August 30, 2016.

=== Retirement ===
On January 15, 2017, during the divisional playoff game between the Seattle Seahawks and the Atlanta Falcons, Werner, as a color commentator for German broadcaster Sat.1, announced his retirement from professional football, citing ongoing problems from injuries as his reason. Werner will continue his work on supporting young European talents to become players in America and the NFL.

== European League of Football ==
On September 21, 2021, it was revealed that Werner became a co-owner of the Berlin Thunder of the European League of Football (ELF). After the 2024 season, Björn Werner stepped down as sporting director and also as owner.

== Broadcasting career ==
Since his retirement from professional football, Werner has served as a commentator and analyst for NCAA and NFL games on German television. He is co-host of the podcast Football Bromance.
