= Tank Carradine =

American football player (born 1990)

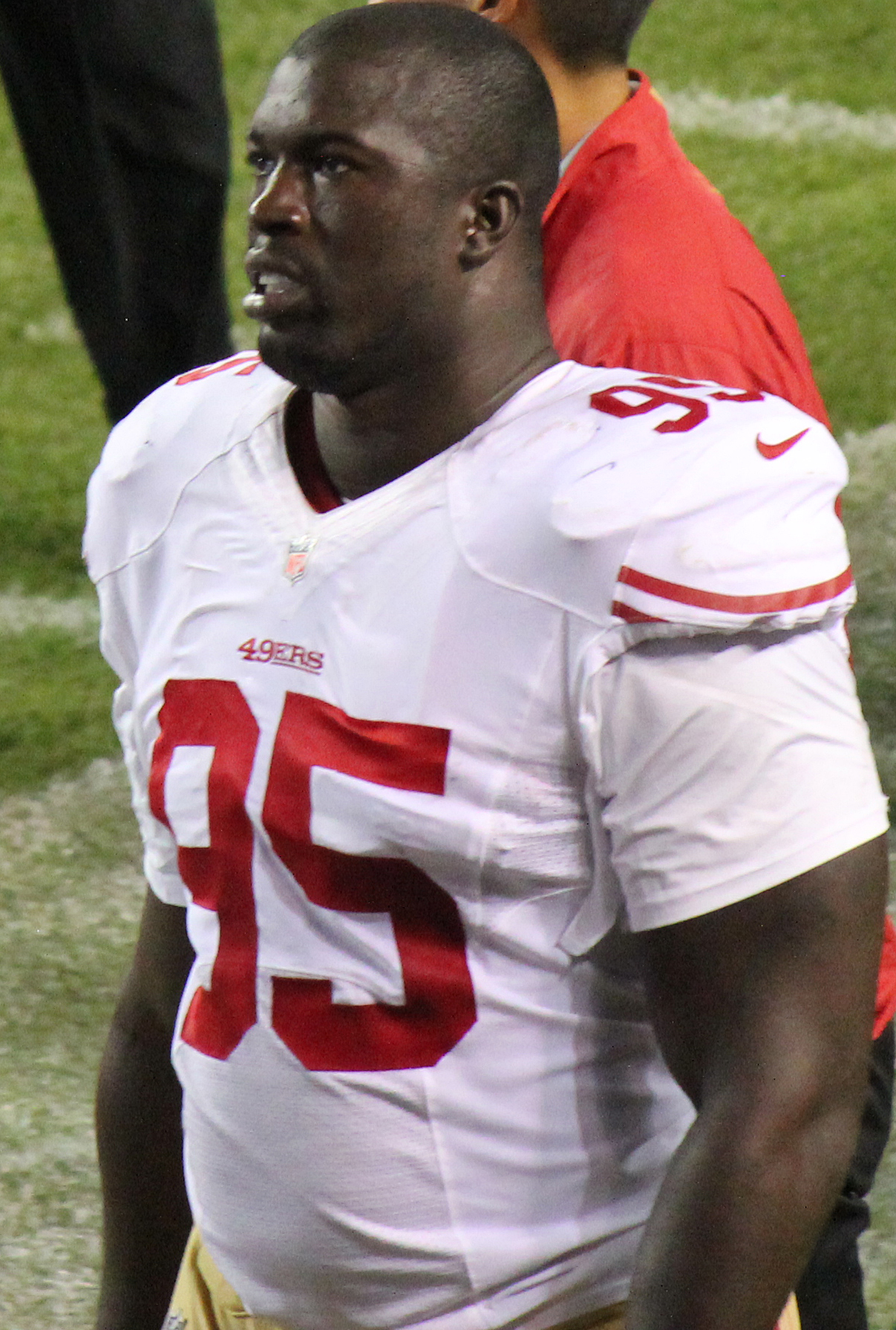
- Carradine with the San Francisco 49ers in 2015

No. 95, 96
- Position: Defensive end

Personal information
- Born: February 18, 1990 (age 36); Cincinnati, Ohio, U.S.
- Listed height: 6 ft 4 in (1.93 m)
- Listed weight: 270 lb (122 kg)

Career information
- High school: Taft (Cincinnati)
- College: Butler CC (2009–2010); Florida State (2011–2012)
- NFL draft: 2013: 2nd round, 40th overall pick

Career history
- San Francisco 49ers (2013–2017); Oakland Raiders (2018); Miami Dolphins (2019)

Awards and highlights
- First-team All-ACC (2012)

Career NFL statistics
- Total tackles: 77
- Sacks: 5.5
- Forced fumbles: 1
- Stats at Pro Football Reference

Cornellius "Tank" Carradine (born February 18, 1990) is an American former professional football player who was a defensive end in the National Football League (NFL). He played college football for the Florida State Seminoles and was selected by the San Francisco 49ers in the second round of the 2013 NFL draft.

== Early life ==
Carradine was born in Cincinnati, Ohio. He attended Taft High School in Cincinnati, and played high school football for the Taft Senators.

== College career ==
Carradine initially attended Butler Community College. He transferred to Florida State University, where he played for coach Jimbo Fisher's Florida State Seminoles football team in 2011 and 2012. Carradine totaled 11 sacks in 11 games in 2012, and suffered a season-ending torn ACL injury in November 2012.

== Professional career ==
Pre-draft measurables
Height	Weight	Arm length	Hand span	Bench press
6 ft 4 1/8 in (1.93 m)	276 lb (125 kg)	34 3/4 in (0.88 m)	10 1/4 in (0.26 m)	32 reps

=== San Francisco 49ers ===
The San Francisco 49ers selected Carradine in the second round, with the 40th overall pick, of the 2013 NFL draft.

On August 27, 2013, he was placed on the reserve/non-football injury list. On October 29, 2013, he was activated and placed on the 53-man active roster.

In the 2016 offseason, Carradine moved to outside linebacker and put his weight down to 273 pounds. On September 6, 2016, Carradine signed a one-year contract extension with the 49ers through 2018.

On September 25, 2017, Carradine was placed on injured reserve with a high ankle sprain. He was activated off injured reserve to the active roster on November 25, 2017.

=== Oakland Raiders ===
On March 17, 2018, Carradine signed with the Oakland Raiders. He was released by the Raiders on October 6, 2018, per his request due to limited playing time.

=== Miami Dolphins ===
On February 15, 2019, Carradine signed with the Miami Dolphins. He was released on August 31, 2019. He was re-signed on September 12, 2019. He was released on September 24, 2019.
