= John Garrett =

John Garrett may refer to:

== Politicians ==
- John Garrett (Australian politician) (1805–1885), member of the New South Wales Legislative Assembly
- John Garrett (British politician) (1931–2007), British management consultant and politician
- John Sidney Garrett (1921–2005), Louisiana state representative
- John W. Garrett (diplomat) (1872–1942), United States ambassador

== Sports ==
- John Garrett (American football) (born 1965), American football coach and former wide receiver
- John Garrett (ice hockey) (1951–2026), Canadian hockey player and sports commentator
- John Garrett (rower) (born 1963), British Olympic rower

== Fictional characters ==
- John Garrett (comics), fictional character from Marvel Comics and Agents of S.H.I.E.L.D. TV series

== Others ==
- John Garrett (cinematographer), cinematographer on 2018 American-Australian film A Boy Called Sailboat
- John Garrett (publisher) (active 2005–2021), publisher of a chain of local newspapers in Texas
- John Raymond Garrett (born 1940), Australian/British photographer
- John W. Garrett (1820–1884), American banker, philanthropist, and railroad executive
