= 2013 Florida State Seminoles football team =

American college football season

2013 Florida State Seminoles football

Consensus national champion ACC champion ACC Atlantic Division champion Florida Cup champion

ACC Championship Game, W 45–7 vs. Duke

BCS National Championship Game, W 34–31 vs. Auburn
- Conference: Atlantic Coast Conference
- Atlantic Division

Ranking
- Coaches: No. 1
- AP: No. 1
- Record: 14–0 (8–0 ACC)
- Head coach: Jimbo Fisher (4th season)
- Offensive scheme: Pro-style
- Defensive coordinator: Jeremy Pruitt (1st season)
- Base defense: Multiple 4–3
- MVPs: Jameis Winston; P. J. Williams
- Captains: Lamarcus Joyner; Bryan Stork; Telvin Smith; Christian Jones; Kenny Shaw; Terrence Brooks; Gerald Demps; Chad Abram Dan Hicks Phillip Doumar Demonte McAllister
- Home stadium: Doak Campbell Stadium

2013 Atlantic Coast Conference football standings
| | Conf. | | | Overall |
| Team | W | | L | W | | L |
|---|---|---|---|---|---|---|
Atlantic Division
| No. 1 Florida State x$# | 8 | – | 0 | 14 | – | 0 |
| No. 8 Clemson % | 7 | – | 1 | 11 | – | 2 |
| Boston College | 4 | – | 4 | 7 | – | 6 |
| Syracuse | 4 | – | 4 | 7 | – | 6 |
| Maryland | 3 | – | 5 | 7 | – | 6 |
| Wake Forest | 2 | – | 6 | 4 | – | 8 |
| NC State | 0 | – | 8 | 3 | – | 9 |
Coastal Division
| No. 23 Duke x | 6 | – | 2 | 10 | – | 4 |
| Miami (FL) | 5 | – | 3 | 9 | – | 4 |
| Virginia Tech | 5 | – | 3 | 8 | – | 5 |
| Georgia Tech | 5 | – | 3 | 7 | – | 6 |
| North Carolina | 4 | – | 4 | 7 | – | 6 |
| Pittsburgh | 3 | – | 5 | 7 | – | 6 |
| Virginia | 0 | – | 8 | 2 | – | 10 |
Championship: Florida State 45, Duke 7
# – BCS National Champion; $ – BCS representative as conference champion; % – BCS at-large representative; x – Division champion/co-champions; Rankings from AP Poll

The 2013 Florida State Seminoles football team, variously Florida State or FSU, represented Florida State University in the sport of American football during the 2013 NCAA Division I FBS college football season. Florida State competed in the Football Bowl Subdivision (FBS) of the National Collegiate Athletic Association (NCAA). The Seminoles were led by fourth-year head coach Jimbo Fisher and played their home games at Bobby Bowden Field at Doak Campbell Stadium in Tallahassee, Florida. They were members of the Atlantic Coast Conference, and played in the Atlantic Division. It was the Seminoles' 22nd season as a member of the ACC and its ninth in the ACC Atlantic Division.

Led by eventual Heisman Trophy winner Jameis Winston, Florida State finished the season with a school-record fourteen wins and completed the school's third undefeated season. The Seminoles captured their seventeenth conference title and third national championship, earning the Grantland Rice Award, the MacArthur Trophy, the Associated Press Trophy and the AFCA National Championship Trophy.

In addition to the Heisman, Jameis Winston won the Walter Camp Award, the Davey O'Brien Award, and the Manning Award as well as being a finalist for the Maxwell Award and honored as the AP Player of the Year. Roberto Aguayo won the Lou Groza Award as the nation's best placekicker, Bryan Stork won the Rimington Trophy awarded to the nation's top center. Ten players were named All-Americans, with three earning consensus honors. For their accomplishments, Lamarcus Joyner was a finalist for both the Jim Thorpe Award and the Nagurski Trophy, and Coach Fisher was named the AFCA Coach of the Year and was a semifinalist for Maxwell Coach of the Year.

Twenty-six Seminoles from the national title team have gone on to play professional football with twenty-five players going on to play in the NFL, including four first-round picks, and one player in the CFL. Nine players have been named consensus All-Americans. Since the National Championship, numerous players have gone on to win a Super Bowl, including Bryan Stork, Tre' Jackson, Ronald Darby, Timmy Jernigan and Cameron Erving. The team set a then FBS record for points in a season with 723, previously held by the 2008 Oklahoma Sooners, led the country in scoring defense allowing only 12.1 points per game and set an FBS record winning by an average margin of 39.5 points per game, the highest ever in modern college football. The 2013 Florida State Seminoles are considered by many experts to be one of the greatest college football teams of all time, and with many arguing they were the most dominant BCS era champion. The team was the final BCS National Champion before the implementation of the College Football Playoffs in 2014.

== Before the season ==
Eleven players from the 2012 team were taken in the 2013 NFL draft.

=== Preseason ===
After the season, FSU lost six coaches from their coaching staff. Defensive coordinator Mark Stoops left his position at Florida State to take the job as head coach at Kentucky. D.J. Eliot left his position as defensive ends coach to assist Stoops at Kentucky as defensive coordinator. Eddie Gran, who served as running back coach and special teams coordinator as well as associate head coach, also left the staff to serve as offensive coordinator at Cincinnati. Offensive coordinator James Coley left Florida State to take the same position at Miami. Greg Hudson, an assistant head coach left his position to become the defensive coordinator at Purdue. Quarterbacks coach Dameyune Craig left Florida State to return to Auburn, his alma mater.

Former Alabama assistant coach, Jeremy Pruitt, joined the Florida State staff as the new defensive coordinator, replacing Mark Stoops. Former Tennessee assistant coach Sal Sunseri was hired as defensive ends coach. Former Minnesota head coach Tim Brewster was hired as tight ends coach. Former South Carolina assistant coach Jay Graham was hired as running backs coach. Former Georgia Tech defensive coordinator Charles Kelly was hired as linebackers coach and special teams. Randy Sanders was hired as quarterbacks coach.

Prior to the start of the season, wide receiver Greg Dent was suspended indefinitely following an arrest and subsequent charge of sexual battery. Just days later, Tight end transfer Kevin Haplea suffered a torn ACL during workouts, ruled to be out for the season. During the offseason, tight end Nick O'Leary (grandson of Jack Nicklaus) was involved in a motorcycle accident but recovered before the start of the season. Just before fall practice, tight end Christo Kourtzidis chose to transfer. At the start of fall practice, freshman tight end Jeremy Kerr suffered a knee cartilage tear leaving him sidelined for an undetermined amount of time. In August, wide receiver Willie Haulstead was released from the team after being named academically ineligible. Running back Mario Pender was also declared ineligible due to academics. Jarred Haggins, a wide receiver, suffered a knee stress fracture in practice causing him to miss the season.

In the ACC Media Poll, Florida State was voted to finish second in the Atlantic Division. FSU led the league with six preseason All-ACC selections in Tre' Jackson, Bryan Stork, and James Wilder, Jr. on offense along with Timmy Jernigan, Christian Jones, and Lamarcus Joyner on defense.

Spring Game

The annual 'Garnet and Gold Game' was held on April 13 at Doak S. Campbell Stadium and the gold team was victorious, winning by a score of 40–24.

== Personnel ==
This was head coach Jimbo Fisher's fourth year as the Seminole's head coach. During his previous three years with Florida State, he led the Seminoles to an overall record of 31 wins and 10 losses (31–10).

Jeremy Pruitt, a former assistant coach at Alabama, assumed the duties of defensive coordinator. Head coach Jimbo Fisher took over as offensive coordinator.

=== Coaching staff ===
Florida State Seminoles coaches

Head coach

- Jimbo Fisher

Assistant coaches

- Rick Trickett– Assistant head coach and offensive line coach
- Jeremy Pruitt – Defensive coordinator and Secondary coach
- Jimbo Fisher – Offensive coordinator
- Randy Sanders – Quarterbacks coach
- Jay Graham – Running backs coach
- Tim Brewster – Tight ends coach/recruiting coordinator
- Lawrence Dawsey – Wide receivers coach
- Sal Sunseri – Defensive ends coach
- Odell Haggins – Defensive line coach
- Charles Kelly – Linebackers coach and special teams coordinator
- Vic Viloria – Head strength and conditioning coach

Support Staff

- Addison Lynch
- Kurt Kennedy
- Jeremiah Wilson
- Brian Williams
- Jamie Mujeni
- Bert Biffani
- George Helow
- David Spurlock
- Blake Snider
- Chris Revell
- Matt McCutchan
- Roy Upchurch
- Mike Warren
- Mario Edwards Sr.
- Ernest Bradley – "Recruiting Intern"
- Paul Sheffield – "Recruiting Intern"

== Returning starters ==
For the 2013 season, Florida State had eight returning starters on offense, three on defense, and one on special teams.

=== Offense ===
| Player | Class | Position |
|---|---|---|
| Karlos Williams | Junior | Running Back |
| Devonta Freeman | Junior | Running Back |
| Rashad Greene | Junior | Wide receiver |
| Kelvin Benjamin | Junior | Wide receiver |
| Kenny Shaw | Senior | Wide receiver |
| Christian Green | Senior | Wide receiver |
| Nick O'Leary | Junior | Tight end |
| Cameron Erving | Junior | Offensive tackle |
| Bryan Stork | Senior | Center |
| Josue Matias | Junior | Guard |
| Bobby Hart | Senior | Offensive tackle |
| Tre Jackson | Junior | Guard |

=== Defense ===
| Player | Class | Position |
|---|---|---|
| Telvin Smith | Senior | Linebacker |
| P. J. Williams | Junior | Cornerback |
| Mario Edwards | Junior | Defensive end |

=== Special teams ===
| Player | Class | Position |
|---|---|---|
| Lamarcus Joyner | Junior | Kick returner |
| Cason Beatty | Sophomore | Punter |

== Media ==
Florida State football was broadcast on the Florida State University Seminoles Radio Network and the games were called by Gene Deckerhoff.

== Rankings ==
Ranking movements Legend: ██ Increase in ranking ██ Decrease in ranking ( ) = First-place votes
| | Week | | | | | | | | | | | | | | | | |
| Poll | Pre | 1 | 2 | 3 | 4 | 5 | 6 | 7 | 8 | 9 | 10 | 11 | 12 | 13 | 14 | 15 | Final |
|---|---|---|---|---|---|---|---|---|---|---|---|---|---|---|---|---|---|
| AP | 11 | 10 | 10 | 8 | 8 | 8 | 6 | 5 | 3 (2) | 3 (2) | 3 (6) | 2 (3) | 2 (5) | 2 (4) | 1 (58) | 1 (56) | 1 (60) |
| Coaches | 12 | 10 | 9 | 8 | 8 | 8 | 6 | 5 | 3 (1) | 3 | 3 (3) | 2 (4) | 2 (6) | 2 (6) | 1 (58) | 1 (62) | 1 (59) |
| Harris | Not released | | | | | | | 5 | 3 (2) | 3 | 3 (2) | 2 | 2 (5) | 2 (5) | 1 (97) | 1 (97) | Not released |
| BCS | Not released | | | | | | | | 2 | 3 | 2 | 2 | 2 | 2 | 1 | 1 | Not released |

*Source: ESPN.com: 2013 NCAA Football Rankings

Other preseason rankings for Florida State include:

- #15 – Athlon Sports
- #13 – Lindy's
- #3 – Phil Steele
- #16 – Dennis Dodd
- #13 – Barnhart (CBS Sports)
- #9 – Feldman (CBS Sports)
- #13 – Fowler (CBS Sports)
- #13 – Palm (CBS Sports)
- #7 – Fornelli (CBS Sports)
- #3 – Hinnen (CBS Sports)
- #11 – Patterson (CBS Sports)
- #10 – Tim Hyland
- #18 – Sporting News
- #12 – Sports Illustrated
- #14 – ESPN
- #17 – FOX Sports
- #14 – National Champs
- #12 – Lost Letterman
- #2 – College Football News
- #25 – College Football Universe
- #11 – ESPN Magazine
- #14 – Steve Helwagen
- #6 – CFB Matrix
- #10 – CapHeresy
- #8 – Pick Six
- #11 – Computer Ratings
- #14 – Arena Fanatic
- #5 – Mclllece Sports
- #12 – Clay Travis/Outkick the Coverage
- #11 – Bleacher Report
- #11 – FWAA

== Statistics ==
The Seminoles ended the season as the highest-scoring team in college football history, surpassing the 2008 Oklahoma Sooners. They have since only been surpassed by the 2019 LSU Tigers (with 726 points), who also went undefeated and won a national championship. However, LSU's total was based on 15 games played while FSU's total was based on 14 games played. Florida State maintains the record for margin of victory over a season with an average of 39.5 points.

=== Scores by quarter (all opponents) ===
| | 1 | 2 | 3 | 4 | Total |
|---|---|---|---|---|---|
| Florida State | 165 | 214 | 203 | 141 | 723 |
| All opponents | 42 | 41 | 29 | 58 | 170 |

=== Scores by quarter (ACC opponents) ===
| | 1 | 2 | 3 | 4 | Total |
|---|---|---|---|---|---|
| Florida State | 125 | 135 | 121 | 75 | 456 |
| ACC opponents | 35 | 13 | 23 | 34 | 105 |

== Schedule ==
| Date | Time | Opponent | Rank | Site | TV | Result | Attendance |
|---|---|---|---|---|---|---|---|
| September 2 | 8:00 p.m. | at Pittsburgh | No. 11 | Heinz Field; Pittsburgh, PA | ESPN | W 41–13 | 65,500 |
| September 14 | 3:30 p.m. | Nevada* | No. 10 | Doak Campbell Stadium; Tallahassee, FL | ESPN | W 62–7 | 73,847 |
| September 21 | 6:00 p.m. | No. 19 (FCS) Bethune–Cookman* | No. 8 | Doak Campbell Stadium; Tallahassee, FL | ESPN3 (PPV) | W 54–6 | 74,841 |
| September 28 | 3:30 p.m. | at Boston College | No. 8 | Alumni Stadium; Chestnut Hill, MA | ABC/ESPN2 | W 48–34 | 40,129 |
| October 5 | 12:00 p.m. | No. 25 Maryland | No. 8 | Doak Campbell Stadium; Tallahassee, FL | ESPN | W 63–0 | 74,909 |
| October 19 | 8:00 p.m. | at No. 3 Clemson | No. 5 | Memorial Stadium; Clemson, SC (rivalry) (College GameDay) | ABC | W 51–14 | 83,428 |
| October 26 | 3:30 p.m. | NC State | No. 3 | Doak Campbell Stadium; Tallahassee, FL | ABC/ESPN2 | W 49–17 | 80,389 |
| November 2 | 8:00 p.m. | No. 7 Miami (FL) | No. 3 | Doak Campbell Stadium; Tallahassee, FL (rivalry) (College GameDay) | ABC | W 41–14 | 84,409^{A} |
| November 9 | 12:30 p.m. | at Wake Forest | No. 3 | BB&T Field; Winston-Salem, NC | ABC | W 59–3 | 30,865 |
| November 16 | 3:30 p.m. | Syracuse^{†} | No. 2 | Doak Campbell Stadium; Tallahassee, FL | ABC/ESPN2 | W 59–3 | 74,491 |
| November 23 | 3:30 p.m. | Idaho* | No. 2 | Doak Campbell Stadium; Tallahassee, FL | ESPNU | W 80–14 | 65,061 |
| November 30 | 12:00 p.m. | at Florida* | No. 2 | Ben Hill Griffin Stadium; Gainesville, FL (rivalry) | ESPN | W 37–7 | 90,454 |
| December 7 | 8:00 p.m. | vs. No. 20 Duke | No. 1 | Bank of America Stadium; Charlotte, NC (ACC Championship Game) | ABC | W 45–7 | 67,694 |
| January 6, 2014 | 8:30 p.m. | vs. No. 2 Auburn* | No. 1 | Rose Bowl; Pasadena, CA (BCS National Championship Game) (College GameDay) | ESPN | W 34–31 | 94,208 |
*Non-conference game; ^{†}Homecoming; Rankings from AP Poll released prior to the game; All times are in Eastern time

- ^ADenotes the largest crowd in Doak Campbell Stadium history

=== Game summaries ===
==== Pittsburgh ====
Florida State at Pittsburgh

| Team | 1 | 2 | 3 | 4 | Total |
|---|---|---|---|---|---|
| • #11 Seminoles | 7 | 21 | 6 | 7 | 41 |
| Panthers | 7 | 3 | 3 | 0 | 13 |

- Date: September 2, 2013
- Location: Heinz Field
  Pittsburgh
- Game start: 8:11 p.m. EST
- Elapsed time: 3:03
- Game attendance: 65,500
- Game weather: 73 °F (23 °C); Wind: W 4mph, Cloudy w/ Showers
- Referee: Jeff Flanagan
- TV announcers (ESPN): Rece Davis (play-by-play), David Pollack and Jesse Palmer (color analysts), Samantha Ponder (sideline)

Scoring summary
| 1 | 10:50 | PITT | Garner, M. 4 yd pass from Savage, T. (Blewitt, C. kick); 9 plays, 80 yds, TOP: 4:10 | PITT 7–0 |
| 1 | 4:11 | FSU | Nick O'Leary 24 yd pass from Jameis Winston (Roberto Aguayo kick); 2 plays, 24 yds, TOP: 0:43 | TIE 7–7 |
| 2 | 13:41 | FSU | Nick O'Leary 2 yd pass from Jameis Winston (Roberto Aguayo kick); 8 plays, 81 yds, TOP: 3:59 | FSU 14–7 |
| 2 | 9:18 | PITT | Blewitt, C. 28 yd field goal; 11 plays, 69 yds, TOP: 4:23 | FSU 14–10 |
| 2 | 2:13 | FSU | Jameis Winston 5 yd run (Roberto Aguayo kick); 14 plays, 78 yds, TOP: 7:05 | FSU 21–10 |
| 2 | 00:38 | FSU | Rashad Greene 23 yd pass from Jameis Winston (Roberto Aguayo kick); 3 plays, 41 yds, TOP: 1:18 | FSU 28–10 |
| 3 | 11:08 | FSU | Roberto Aguayo 22 yd field goal; 8 plays, 70 yds, TOP: 3:52 | FSU 31–10 |
| 3 | 4:43 | PITT | Blewitt, C. 39 yd field goal; 11 plays, 52 yds, TOP: 6:25 | FSU 31–13 |
| 3 | 1:12 | FSU | Roberto Aguayo 28 yd field goal; 8 plays, 64 yds, TOP: 3:31 | FSU 34–13 |
| 4 | 9:32 | FSU | Nick O'Leary 10 yd pass from Jameis Winston (Roberto Aguayo kick); 9 plays, 49 yds, TOP: 5:28 | FSU 41–13 |

Pittsburgh Leads Series: 5 – 3

On February 23, 2013, officials from both Florida State and Pittsburgh, as well as the commissioner of the Atlantic Coast Conference announced that the Seminoles and the Panthers would open the season at Heinz Field on Labor Day in what would be Pittsburgh's first game as a member of the ACC.

In the game that would serve as the debut of Jameis Winston as quarterback, the Seminoles had to overcome an early deficit to defeat the Panthers, 41–13. After Pitt scored on their first possession to take a touchdown lead, Florida State quickly responded on their first drive with a touchdown pass from Winston to Nick O'Leary to tie the game. Winston and O'Leary would connect twice more for touchdowns in a game where the offense rolled.

The first quarter would end with a tie game. Driving down the field, Florida State took their first lead of the game with another touchdown pass to Nick O'Leary. Pittsburgh was able to close the gap to four points after a twenty-eight-yard field goal. The Seminoles would extend their lead with a rushing touchdown from Jameis Winston and a pass to Rashad Greene following an interception to give Florida State an eighteen-point lead at halftime. The third quarter was mostly uneventful with a pair of field goals from Florida State and a single field goal from Pittsburgh. The Seminoles held a three score lead going into the fourth quarter. Winston would add another touchdown in the final quarter.

Following Pitt's touchdown on the first drive, Florida State kept them out of the end zone for the remainder of the game and held the Panthers to just two field goals. After a slow start for the defense, Pitt was held to only 297 yards of offense and one touchdown.

For his four touchdown and 356 all-purpose yardage rookie performance, Winston was recognized as the Davey O'Brien Quarterback of the Week while tight end Nick O'Leary was named the John Mackey Tight End of the Week. The victory improved Florida State's all-time record against the Panthers to 4–5.

The game drew 4.5 million viewers and a 2.9 rating for ESPN, a three-year high for the network's Labor Day game. It was the third-most viewed game of college football's opening week.

==== Nevada ====
Nevada at Florida State

| Team | 1 | 2 | 3 | 4 | Total |
|---|---|---|---|---|---|
| Wolf Pack | 0 | 7 | 0 | 0 | 7 |
| • #10 Seminoles | 3 | 14 | 31 | 14 | 62 |

- Date: September 14, 2013
- Location: Doak Campbell Stadium
  Tallahassee, Florida
- Game start: 3:35 p.m. EST
- Elapsed time: 3:20
- Game attendance: 73,847
- Game weather: 90 °F (32 °C); Wind: WSW 4mph, Partly Cloudy, 47% humidity
- Referee: Jerry Magallane
- TV announcers (ESPN): Bob Wischusen (play-by-play), Rod Gilmore (color analyst), Quint Kessenich (sideline)

Scoring summary
| 1 | 6:19 | FSU | Roberto Aguayo 23 yd field goal; 12 plays, 77 yds, TOP: 5:28 | FSU 3–0 |
| 2 | 4:11 | NEV | WIMBERLY, B. 11 yd pass from COMBS, Devin (ZUZO, Brent kick); 4 plays, 28 yds, TOP: 2:02 | NEV 7–3 |
| 2 | 3:21 | FSU | Kenny Shaw 24 yd pass from Jameis Winston (Roberto Aguayo kick); 7 plays, 92 yds, TOP: 2:33 | FSU 10–7 |
| 2 | 00:38 | FSU | Rashad Greene 24 yd pass from Jameis Winston (Roberto Aguayo kick); 4 plays, 56 yds, TOP: 1:12 | FSU 17–7 |
| 3 | 14:29 | FSU | Devonta Freeman 6 yd run (Roberto Aguayo kick); 2 plays, 66 yds, TOP: 0:25 | FSU 24–7 |
| 3 | 12:47 | FSU | Karlos Williams 65 yd run (Roberto Aguayo kick); 1 play, 65 yds, TOP: 0:08 | FSU 31–7 |
| 3 | 10:06 | FSU | James Wilder Jr. 1 yd run (Roberto Aguayo kick); 4 plays, 61 yds, TOP: 1:17 | FSU 38–7 |
| 3 | 4:41 | FSU | Jameis Winston 10 yd run (Roberto Aguayo kick); 5 plays, 45 yds, TOP: 1:17 | FSU 45–7 |
| 3 | 00:58 | FSU | Roberto Aguayo 33 yd field goal; 7 plays, 62 yds, TOP: 2:14 | FSU 48–7 |
| 4 | 7:11 | FSU | Freddie Stevenson 1 yd run (Roberto Aguayo kick); 9 plays, 69 yds, TOP: 4:42 | FSU 55–7 |
| 4 | 2:48 | FSU | Ryan Green 1 yd run (Roberto Aguayo kick); 6 plays, 64 yds, TOP: 2:45 | FSU 62–7 |

Series Tied: 0 – 0

In their home opener, Florida State faced the Nevada Wolf Pack of the Mountain West Conference. After a slow start and another early deficit, the Seminoles would go on to defeat the Wolf Pack in dominating fashion, 62–7, after scoring 59 unanswered points.

The Seminoles would strike first courtesy of a field goal from Roberto Aguayo, which would serve as the only score of the first quarter. Going into the second quarter, the Seminoles held a three-point lead but they would eventually trail after Nevada scored the first touchdown of the game to take a four-point lead. However, this would be the only points allowed by the Seminole defense. Florida State scored touchdowns on two consecutive drives with two passes from quarterback Jameis Winston to Kenny Shaw and Rashad Greene to take a ten-point lead into the half.

Florida State rolled during the second half of the game, scoring thirty-one points in the third quarter and fourteen more points in the fourth quarter while holding Nevada scoreless.

Despite allowing a touchdown early in the game, the Florida State defense allowed only 214 yards while the Florida State offense tallied up 617 yards of total offense.

Winston continued to impress completing fifteen of his eighteen pass attempts with 214 yards, two passing touchdowns and one rushing touchdown. For his performance, he was named the ACC Rookie of the Week for the second consecutive week. Kicker Roberto Aguayo was also honored as the ACC Specialist of the Week after a game that saw him kick a career long field goal of 33 yards as well as make all eight extra-point attempts. The eight touchdowns were all scored by different players: Devonta Freeman, Ryan Green, Freddie Stevenson, James Wilder Jr., Karlos Williams (in his first start as running back), and Jameis Winston scored rushing touchdowns while Rashad Greene and Kenny Shaw scored the game's two receiving touchdowns.

==== Bethune–Cookman ====
Bethune–Cookman at Florida State

| Team | 1 | 2 | 3 | 4 | Total |
|---|---|---|---|---|---|
| #19 (FCS) Wildcats | 0 | 0 | 6 | 0 | 6 |
| • #8 Seminoles | 10 | 23 | 21 | 0 | 54 |

- Date: September 21, 2013
- Location: Doak Campbell Stadium
  Tallahassee, Florida
- Game start: 6:04 p.m. EST
- Elapsed time: 3:25
- Game attendance: 74,841
- Game weather: 72 °F (22 °C); Wind: S 6mph, Cloudy, 70% chance of rain
- Referee: Walt Davenport
- TV announcers (ESPN3): John Sadak (play-by-play), Al Groh (color analyst), Tiffany Greene (sideline)

Scoring summary
| 1 | 8:39 | FSU | Telvin Smith 68 yd interception return (Roberto Aguayo kick) | FSU 7–0 |
| 1 | 2:33 | FSU | Roberto Aguayo 45 yd field goal; 7 plays, 58 yds, TOP: 1:34 | FSU 10–0 |
| 2 | 13:50 | FSU | TEAM safety | FSU 12–0 |
| 2 | 12:11 | FSU | Kelvin Benjamin 11 yd pass from Jameis Winston (Roberto Aguayo kick); 4 plays, 46 yds, TOP: 1:34 | FSU 19–0 |
| 2 | 5:49 | FSU | James Wilder Jr. 2 yd run (Roberto Aguayo kick); 12 plays, 82 yds, TOP: 4:50 | FSU 26–0 |
| 2 | 1:13 | FSU | James Wilder Jr. 2 yd run (Roberto Aguayo kick); 8 plays, 66 yds, TOP: 1:53 | FSU 33–0 |
| 3 | 13:39 | FSU | James Wilder Jr. 2 yd run (Roberto Aguayo kick); 4 plays, 69 yds, TOP: 1:17 | FSU 40–0 |
| 3 | 8:21 | BCU | WILSON, Jackie 7 yd run (CAGLE, Jonathan kick failed); 12 plays, 75 yds, TOP: 5:18 | FSU 40–6 |
| 3 | 6:15 | FSU | Karlos Williams 3 yd run (Roberto Aguayo kick); 4 plays, 53 yds, TOP: 1:58 | FSU 47–6 |
| 3 | 00:46 | FSU | Karlos Williams 1 yd run (Roberto Aguayo kick); 6 plays, 63 yds, TOP: 2:31 | FSU 54–6 |

Series Tied: 0 – 0

In their third game of the season, Florida State defeated the Bethune–Cookman Wildcats on a rainy night in their first meeting by a final score of 54–6. Coming into this game, Florida State held a 19–0 record against teams from the Football Championship Subdivision.

Florida State jumped out to a quick lead by scoring the first 40 points of the game. Telvin Smith opened up the scoring for The Seminoles with an interception returned for a touchdown followed up by a 45-yard field goal from Roberto Auayo. A safety, caused by a penalty in the endzone by the Wildcats, gave the Seminoles an early twelve point lead. Florida State then scored three straight touchdowns courtesy of Kelvin Benjamin, James Wilder Jr., and Devonta Freeman to carry a thirty-three point lead into halftime.

Bethune–Cookman scored their first points at the start of the third quarter with a seven-yard touchdown run; they subsequently missed the extra point kick. Florida State would then score the final fourteen points of the game with two touchdown runs from newly converted RB Karlos Williams.

The defense allowed only 242 yards while the offense gained 492 total yards. Quarterback Jameis Winston completed 10 of 19 passes for 148 yards and two touchdowns. Running back Devonta Freeman led the team in rushing while wide receiver Kenny Shaw led the team in receiving.

==== Boston College ====
Florida State at Boston College

| Team | 1 | 2 | 3 | 4 | Total |
|---|---|---|---|---|---|
| • #8 Seminoles | 3 | 21 | 14 | 10 | 48 |
| Eagles | 14 | 3 | 10 | 7 | 34 |

- Date: September 28, 2013
- Location: Alumni Stadium
  Chestnut Hill, Massachusetts
- Game start: 3:41 p.m. EST
- Elapsed time: 3:20
- Game attendance: 40,129
- Game weather: 73 °F (23 °C); Wind: ENE 9mph, Sunny
- Referee: Pat Garvey
- TV announcers (ABC/ESPN2): Sean McDonough (play-by-play), Chris Spielman (color analyst), Shannon Spake (sideline)

Scoring summary
| 1 | 9:58 | BC | M Moore 6 yd pass from C Rettig (N Freese kick); 8 plays, 36 yards, TOP 4:05 | BC 7–0 |
| 1 | 6:34 | FSU | Roberto Aguayo 40 yd field goal; 7 plays, 53 yards, TOP 3:24 | BC 7–3 |
| 1 | 1:46 | BC | J Sinkovec 3 yd pass from C Rettig (N Freese kick); 10 plays, 75 yards, TOP 4:48 | BC 14–3 |
| 2 | 11:19 | BC | N Freese 24 yd field goal; 8 plays, 55 yards, TOP 4:04 | BC 17–3 |
| 2 | 10:35 | FSU | Rashad Greene 56 yd pass from Jameis Winston (Roberto Aguayo kick); 2 plays, 75 yards, TOP 0:44 | BC 17–10 |
| 2 | 1:49 | FSU | Chad Abram 10 yd pass from Jameis Winston (Roberto Aguayo kick); 7 plays, 80 yards, TOP 2:55 | TIE 17–17 |
| 2 | 00:00 | FSU | Kenny Shaw 55 yd pass from Jameis Winston (Roberto Aguayo kick); 3 plays, 60 yards, TOP 0:50 | FSU 24–17 |
| 3 | 11:52 | BC | N Freese 24 yd field goal; 6 plays, 19 yards, TOP 3:08 | FSU 24–20 |
| 3 | 9:06 | FSU | Rashad Greene 10 yd pass from Jameis Winston (Roberto Aguayo kick); 9 plays, 75 yards, TOP 2:46 | FSU 31–20 |
| 3 | 3:42 | FSU | Karlos Williams 1 yd run (Roberto Aguayo kick); 9 plays, 60 yards, TOP 3:48 | FSU 38–20 |
| 3 | 2:10 | BC | M Willis 52 yd pass from C Rettig (N Freese kick); 5 plays, 79 yards, TOP 1:32 | FSU 38–27 |
| 4 | 14:07 | FSU | Roberto Aguayo 20 yd field goal; 9 plays, 80 yards, TOP 3:03 | FSU 41–27 |
| 4 | 13:41 | FSU | P. J. Williams 20 yd interception return (Roberto Aguayo kick) | FSU 48–27 |
| 4 | 9:44 | BC | M Moore 17 yd pass from C Rettig (N Freese kick); 7 plays, 75 yards, TOP 3:57 | FSU 48–34 |

Florida State Leads Series: 7 – 4

For their second road game of the season, the first since the season opener, Florida State hit the road to face the Boston College Eagles. In 2012, Florida State was victorious with a 51–7 win over the Eagles in Tallahassee. Florida State last traveled to Chestnut Hill in 2011 for a Thursday night match-up, a game the Seminoles won 38–7.

Florida State mounted a comeback to defeat Boston College, 48–34, in their second conference game of the season.

After stopping Florida State on their first offensive possession, Boston College took the early lead with a touchdown pass from BC quarterback Chase Rettig. Florida State responded with a seven play drive that ended in a field goal to cut the lead to four. The Eagles would then go on to score the next ten points of the game to take a fourteen-point lead and seemingly seize control of the game. However, the Seminoles rattled off twenty-one unanswered points including a "Hail Mary" pass, with no time remaining, at the end of the second quarter to take a seven-point lead at the half.

On the first drive of the second half, Boston College mustered up a drive that resulted in a field goal to close the gap and make it a four-point game. Florida State then completed two drives ending in touchdowns to take an eighteen-point lead. Boston College added another touchdown at the end of the third quarter. Entering the fourth quarter, Florida State held an eleven-point lead. In the final quarter, Florida State would extend their lead with a field goal. Boston College then began a promising drive, but P. J. Williams intercepted the ball and returned it for a touchdown to put the Noles up 48–27 late in the game. Boston College closed the gap with a touchdown to pull within two scores midway through the quarter. Florida State sealed the win with a late interception to take possession of the ball with less than two minutes remaining.

Although Boston College controlled the game early, Florida State outgained them with 489 yards of offense while limiting to Eagles to 397 total yards. Quarterback Jameis Winston completed 17 of 27 passes for 330 yards and four touchdowns. Winston also led the team in rushing with 14 rushes for 96 yards while wide receiver Kenny Shaw led the team in receiving with 4 receptions for 93 yards and one touchdown.

This was the 12th meeting between Florida State and Boston College, the 8th meeting as conference opponents. The victory improved Florida State's all-time record against the Eagles to 8–4.

==== Maryland ====
Maryland at Florida State

| Team | 1 | 2 | 3 | 4 | Total |
|---|---|---|---|---|---|
| #25 Terrapins | 0 | 0 | 0 | 0 | 0 |
| • #8 Seminoles | 7 | 14 | 21 | 21 | 63 |

- Date: October 5, 2013
- Location: Doak Campbell Stadium
  Tallahassee, Florida
- Game start: 12:01 p.m. EST
- Elapsed time: 3:16
- Game attendance: 74,909
- Game weather: 86 °F (30 °C); Wind: ESE 6mph, 58% humidity
- Referee: David Epperley
- TV announcers (ESPN): Dave Pasch (play-by-play), Brian Griese (color analyst), Tom Luginbill (sideline)

Scoring summary
| 1 | 8:14 | FSU | Karlos Williams 1 yd run (Roberto Aguayo kick); 10 plays, 77 yards, TOP 4:40 | FSU 7–0 |
| 2 | 6:15 | FSU | Devonta Freeman 5 yd run (Roberto Aguayo kick); 9 plays, 80 yards, TOP 4:11 | FSU 14–0 |
| 2 | 00:28 | FSU | Kelvin Benjamin 5 yd pass from Jameis Winston (Roberto Aguayo kick); 9 plays, 78 yards, TOP 3:20 | FSU 21–0 |
| 3 | 12:18 | FSU | Nick O'Leary 8 yd pass from Jameis Winston (Roberto Aguayo kick); 7 plays, 94 yards, TOP 2:38 | FSU 28–0 |
| 3 | 9:47 | FSU | Kenny Shaw 21 yd pass from Jameis Winston (Roberto Aguayo kick); 6 plays, 55 yards, TOP 1:43 | FSU 35–0 |
| 3 | 1:50 | FSU | Nick O'Leary 12 yd pass from Jameis Winston (Roberto Aguayo kick); 10 plays, 83 yards, TOP 5:15 | FSU 42–0 |
| 4 | 14:56 | FSU | Kelvin Benjamin 21 yd pass from Jameis Winston (Roberto Aguayo kick); 1 play, 21 yards, TOP 0:04 | FSU 49–0 |
| 4 | 11:28 | FSU | Karlos Williams 17 yd run (Roberto Aguayo kick); 7 plays, 66 yards, TOP 2:03 | FSU 56–0 |
| 4 | 9:49 | FSU | Jacob Coker 24 yd run (Roberto Aguayo kick); 1 play, 24 yards, TOP 0:07 | FSU 63–0 |

Florida State Leads Series: 21 – 2

After a tough road game, the Seminoles returned home to face the Maryland Terrapins, who were ranked twenty-fifth in the nation coming into the game. In 2012, Florida State was victorious with a 41–14 win over the Terrapins in College Park, clinching the division in the process. In Maryland's last visit to Tallahassee in 2011, the Terps lost to the Seminoles by a score of 41–16. This game marked the final meeting between the teams as conference opponents as Maryland is leaving for the Big Ten Conference following the end of this season.

Florida State earned their first shutout of the season with a rout of Maryland, 63–0, setting a record for the most lop-sided victory against a ranked opponent in school history as well as the first shut-out of a ranked opponent in sixteen years.

Florida State struck first on offense and defense, forcing a three-and-out on the opening possession of the game and scoring a touchdown on their first possession. Maryland's defense held Florida State scoreless for the rest of the first quarter. However, Florida State would score another fourteen points in the second quarter courtesy of two five-yard touchdown runs from Devonta Freeman and Kelvin Benjamin. At halftime, Florida State held a 21–0 lead.

The Seminoles opened up the second half with another scoring drive capping off with an eight-yard pass from Jameis Winston to tight end Nick O'Leary to extend the lead to twenty eight. The second half was an offensive explosion for Florida State as the Seminoles went on a forty-two point scoring spree. With a twenty-one-yard pass to Kenny Shaw and a twelve-yard pass to Nick O'Leary, Florida State carried a forty-two point lead into the final quarter. Florida State continued to score in the fourth with another twenty-one point quarter that consisted of touchdowns from Kelvin Benjamin and Karlos Williams along with backup QB Jacob Coker.

Florida State dominated the game with 614 yards of offense while the defense limited the Terrapins to only 234 total yards. Quarterback Jameis Winston completed 23 of 32 passes for 393 yards and five touchdowns and led the team in passing. Devonta Freeman led the team in rushing with 17 rushes for 63 yards while Rashad Greene led the team in receiving with 4 receptions for 108 yards.

This was the 24th and final meeting between Florida State and Maryland, the 22nd and last meeting as conference opponents. The victory improved Florida State's all-time record against the Terps to 22–2. The victory also improved Florida State's record against the Terps to 12–0 at Doak.

==== Clemson ====
#5 Florida State Seminoles (5–0) at #3 Clemson Tigers (6–0)

| Quarter | 1 | 2 | 3 | 4 | Total |
|---|---|---|---|---|---|
| Florida St | 17 | 10 | 14 | 10 | 51 |
| Clemson | 7 | 0 | 0 | 7 | 14 |

at Memorial Stadium • Clemson, South Carolina

- Date: October 19
- Game time: 8:20 p.m. EDT
- Game weather: Partly cloudy • 60 °F (16 °C) • Wind S/SW 5 miles per hour (8.0 km/h; 4.3 kn)
- Game attendance: 83,428
- Referee: Jeff Flanagan
- TV announcers (ABC): Brent Musburger, Kirk Herbstreit & Heather Cox
- Box Score

Game information

Florida St

- Jameis Winston
  22/34, 444 Yds, 3 TD, INT
- Devonta Freeman
  21 Rush, 84 Yds, TD
- Nick O'Leary
  5 Rec, 161 Yds

Clemson

- Tajh Boyd
  17/37, 156 Yds, TD, 2 INT
- Roderick McDowell
  11 Rush, 61 Yds
- Sammy Watkins
  8 Rec, 68 Yds, TD

Following a bye week, Florida State traveled to Clemson to face the Clemson Tigers in a top five matchup. In 2012, Florida State was victorious with a 49–37 comeback win over the Tigers in Tallahassee en route to an Atlantic Division title and an ACC Championship. Florida State last traveled to Death Valley in 2011, a game the Seminoles lost 35–30, furthering their win drought in Clemson, a place they have not won at since 2001. The winner of this game has represented the Atlantic Division in the ACC Championship Game for the past four years with Clemson winning the division title in 2009 and 2011 while Florida State won it in 2010 and 2012.

Under the lights (and with the attendance of College GameDay), Florida State stunned the third-ranked Clemson Tigers, 51–14, becoming the first team in history to score 50 points at Memorial Stadium.

Florida State struck early, capitalizing on a Clemson turnover on the first play from scrimmage. The Seminoles scored a touchdown on their third play as Winston threw a touchdown on his first pass of the game. Florida State added a field goal on their second series of the game. With a ten-point lead, Mario Edwards Jr. returned a fumble for a touchdown that put the Seminoles up 17–0. Clemson scored their first points of the game near the end of the first quarter with a touchdown pass from Tajh Boyd to Sammy Watkins to cut the lead back down to ten. Florida State doubled their lead with a touchdown and a field goal in the second quarter while Clemson failed to score. The Seminoles went into the half holding a twenty-point advantage.

Florida State continued to control the game in the second half, scoring twenty-four straight points, courtesy of a passing touchdown to Rashad Greene, rushing touchdowns from Devonta Freeman and Jameis Winston, and a field goal from Roberto Agauyo. Clemson would not make it into the endzone again until the end of the fourth quarter, securing a thirty-seven point win for the Noles.

Florida State amassed 565 yards of offense while the defense held the Tigers to 326 total yards and a season low 14 points. Quarterback Jameis Winston completed 22 of 34 passes for 444 yards and four touchdowns, three passing and one rushing, while leading the team in passing. Devonta Freeman led the team in rushing with 21 rushes for 84 yards while Nick O'Leary led the team in receiving with 5 receptions for 161 yards.

This was the 29th meeting between Florida State and Clemson, the 22nd meeting as conference opponents. The victory improved Florida State's all-time record against the Tigers to 19–8. With the win, Florida State became bowl eligible for the thirty-second consecutive year, the longest active streak in college football.

Scoring summary

| Quarter | Time | Drive | | | Team | Scoring information | Score | |
| Quarter | Time | Plays | Yards | TOP | Team | Scoring information | FSU | CLEM |
|---|---|---|---|---|---|---|---|---|
| 1 | 13:38 | 3 | 34 | 1:14 | Florida St | Kelvin Benjamin 22-yard touchdown reception from Jameis Winston, Roberto Aguayo kick good | 7 | 0 |
| 1 | 4:18 | 16 | 77 | 7:39 | Florida St | 28-yard field goal by Roberto Aguayo | 10 | 0 |
| 1 | 3:07 | | | | Florida St | Fumble recovery returned 37 yards for touchdown by Mario Edwards Jr., Roberto Aguayo kick good | 17 | 0 |
| 1 | 0:51 | 11 | 65 | 2:16 | Clemson | Sammy Watkins 3-yard touchdown reception from Tajh Boyd, Chandler Catanzaro kick good | 17 | 7 |
| 2 | 7:08 | 4 | 95 | 1:39 | Florida St | Rashad Greene 72-yard touchdown reception from Jameis Winston, Robert Aguayo kick good | 24 | 7 |
| 2 | 0:03 | 13 | 72 | 5:13 | Florida St | 24-yard field goal by Roberto Aguayo | 27 | 7 |
| 3 | 13:33 | 6 | 42 | 1:20 | Florida St | Rashad Greene 17-yard touchdown reception from Jameis Winston, Roberto Aguayo kick good | 34 | 7 |
| 3 | 4:04 | 8 | 66 | 3:09 | Florida St | Jameis Winston 4-yard touchdown run, Roberto Aguayo kick good | 41 | 7 |
| 4 | 12:17 | 7 | 57 | 4:05 | Florida St | Devonta Freeman 2-yard touchdown run, Roberto Aguayo kick good | 48 | 7 |
| 4 | 4:41 | 6 | 97 | 3:59 | Florida St | 20-yard field goal by Roberto Aguayo | 51 | 7 |
| 4 | 0:13 | 16 | 71 | 4:23 | Clemson | Cole Stoudt 2-yard touchdown run, Chandler Catanzaro kick good | 51 | 14 |
| "TOP" = time of possession. For other American football terms, see Glossary of American football. | | | | | | | 51 | 14 |

==== NC State ====
NC State at Florida State

| Team | 1 | 2 | 3 | 4 | Total |
|---|---|---|---|---|---|
| Wolfpack | 0 | 0 | 10 | 7 | 17 |
| • #3 Seminoles | 35 | 7 | 0 | 7 | 49 |

- Date: October 26, 2013
- Location: Doak Campbell Stadium
  Tallahassee, Florida
- Game start: 3:39 p.m. EST
- Elapsed time: 3:18
- Game attendance: 80,389
- Game weather: 71 °F (22 °C); Wind: NNE 5mph, clear skies
- Referee: Jerry Magallane
- TV announcers (ABC/ESPN2): Sean McDonough (play-by-play), Chris Spielman (color analyst), Shannon Spake (sideline)

Scoring summary
| 1 | 13:02 | FSU | Karlos Williams 18 yd run (Roberto Aguayo kick); 4 plays, 65 yards, TOP 1:25 | FSU 7–0 |
| 1 | 11:12 | FSU | Kelvin Benjamin 39 yd pass from Jameis Winston (Roberto Aguayo kick); 1 play, 39 yards, TOP 0:08 | FSU 14–0 |
| 1 | 7:02 | FSU | Devonta Freeman 11 yd run (Roberto Aguayo kick); 7 plays, 62 yards, TOP 2:29 | FSU 21–0 |
| 1 | 6:09 | FSU | Nick O'Leary 14 yd pass from Jameis Winston (Roberto Aguayo kick); 2 plays, 14 yards, TOP 0:11 | FSU 28–0 |
| 1 | 2:02 | FSU | Rashad Greene 42 yd pass from Jameis Winston (Roberto Aguayo kick); 5 plays, 89 yards, TOP 1:55 | FSU 35–0 |
| 2 | 3:06 | FSU | Devonta Freeman 4 yd run (Roberto Aguayo kick); 6 plays, 54 yards, TOP 1:14 | FSU 42–0 |
| 3 | 7:51 | NCST | Sade, N. 36 yd field goal; 12 plays, 75 yards, TOP 5:09 | FSU 42–3 |
| 3 | 00:59 | NCST | Thornton, S. 72 yd run (Sade, N. kick); 3 plays, 88 yards, TOP 0:57 | FSU 42–10 |
| 4 | 7:16 | NCST | Thornton, S. 1 yd run (Sade, N. kick); 11 plays, 62 yards, TOP 3:50 | FSU 42–17 |
| 4 | 2:19 | FSU | Kermit Whitfield 31 yd run (Roberto Aguayo kick); 9 plays, 79 yards, TOP 4:51 | FSU 49–17 |

Florida State Leads Series: 22 – 11

In a game that honored former head coach Bobby Bowden, Florida State faced the NC State Wolfpack. In 2012, Florida State was upset by the Wolfpack, 17–16, in Raleigh, giving the Seminoles their first loss of the season. When North Carolina State last traveled to Tallahassee in 2011, the Wolfpack were defeated by the Seminoles 34–0.

Florida State avenged last season's upset loss to NC State, riding on a huge first quarter to defeat the Wolfpack, 49–17.

The Seminoles took control of the game early, scoring the first thirty-five points. The first score of the game came from an 18-yard run from Karlos Williams following an interception by Brandon Mitchell. The next score came courtesy of a 39-yard touchdown pass from Jameis Winston to Kelvin Benjamin to give the Noles an early fourteen-point advantage. Devonta Freeman scored on an 11-yard rush for a touchdown. After a forced fumble by Terrence Brooks, Florida State converted the turnover into points with a 14-yard pass to Nick O'Leary. The Seminoles ended the first quarter with another receiving touchdown from Rashad Greene. The scoring continued in the second quarter when Devonta Freeman ran four yards for a touchdown. Florida State scored a total of 42 points in the first half while holding NC State scoreless.

NC State put their first points on the board in the third quarter by scoring ten unanswered points with a field goal and a 72-yard touchdown. The Wolfpack added seven more points in the fourth with another rushing touchdown. Florida State scored their final points of the game with a 31-yard rushing touchdown from Levonte Whitfield to secure the blowout win.

Florida State amassed 566 yards of offense, giving the Seminoles over 500 yards of offense for the fifth consecutive conference game, while the defense held the Wolfpack to 316 total yards. Quarterback Jameis Winston completed 16 of 26 passes for 292 yards and three touchdowns. Devonta Freeman led the team in rushing with 12 rushes for 92 yards and two touchdowns while Rashad Greene led the team in receiving with 8 receptions for 137 yards and a touchdown.

This was the 24th meeting between Florida State and NC State, the 22nd meeting as conference opponents. The victory improved Florida State's all-time record against the Wolfpack to 23–11.

==== Miami (FL) ====
Miami at Florida State (Florida State–Miami football rivalry)

| Team | 1 | 2 | 3 | 4 | Total |
|---|---|---|---|---|---|
| #7 Hurricanes | 7 | 7 | 0 | 0 | 14 |
| • #3 Seminoles | 7 | 14 | 14 | 6 | 41 |

- Date: November 2, 2013
- Location: Doak Campbell Stadium
  Tallahassee, Florida
- Game start: 8:20 p.m. EST
- Elapsed time: 3:10
- Game attendance: 84,409
- Game weather: 67 °F (19 °C); Wind: WNW 5mph, Clear, O% rain
- Referee: Dennis Hennigan
- TV announcers (ABC): Brent Musburger (play-by-play), Kirk Herbstreit (color analyst), Heather Cox and Tom Rinaldi (sideline)

Scoring summary
| 1 | 9:16 | FSU | Devonta Freeman 5 yd run (Roberto Aguayo kick); 13 plays, 72 yards, TOP 5:44 | FSU 7–0 |
| 1 | 2:43 | MIA | Allen Hurns 33 yd pass from Stephen Morris (Matt Goudis kick); 5 plays, 65 yards, TOP 1:38 | TIE 7–7 |
| 2 | 10:42 | FSU | James Wilder Jr. 1 yd run (Roberto Aguayo kick); 11 plays, 79 yards, TOP 6:50 | FSU 14–7 |
| 2 | 5:08 | FSU | Devonta Freeman 48 yd pass from Jameis Winston (Roberto Aguayo kick); 5 plays, 80 yards, TOP 2:35 | FSU 21–7 |
| 2 | 00:22 | MIA | Allen Hurns 14 yd pass from Stephen Morris (Matt Goudis kick); 8 plays, 57 yards, TOP 1:43 | FSU 21–14 |
| 3 | 8:33 | FSU | James Wilder Jr. 5 yd run (Roberto Aguayo kick); 10 plays, 83 yards, TOP 4:42 | FSU 28–14 |
| 3 | 3:41 | FSU | Devonta Freeman 12 yd run (Roberto Aguayo kick); 9 plays, 79 yards, TOP 4:38 | FSU 35–14 |
| 4 | 1:03 | FSU | Roberto Aguayo 28 yd field goal; 6 plays, 33 yards, TOP 3:39 | FSU 41–14 |

Miami Leads Series: 31 – 26

Following an emotional game, Florida State took on their rival, the Miami Hurricanes. In 2012, Florida State was victorious with a 33–20 win in Miami Gardens. Miami last traveled to Tallahassee in 2011, where the Hurricanes lost to the Seminoles 23–19 in a game dominated by questionable calls from the referees. College Gameday was on campus to witness the top ten clash, marking the tenth time that the program has visited campus and the twenty-sixth appearance for the school.

In front of a record crowd, Florida State defeated their rival for the fourth straight time, 41–14.

The Seminoles scored the first points on the opening drive of the game when Devonta Freeman ran the ball into the endzone to give Florida State an early seven-point lead. Miami then drove the ball down the field only to be stopped in the red zone; the Hurricanes then attempted a field goal that sailed wide left. As the Seminoles were once again going down the field, Jameis Winston threw his first interception of the season that led to a Miami touchdown five plays later to tie the game at 7. The first quarter ended in a tie game. Florida State responded by scoring the fourteen unanswered points courtesy of a rushing touchdown from James Wilder, Jr. and a receiving touchdown from Devonta Freeman. Looking to go up by more before the half, Jameis Winston made his second mistake of the game with an interception that led to another Miami score, to make the score 21–14 at halftime.

The Seminoles went on to dominate the second half, scoring twenty points while holding Miami scoreless. James Wilder, Jr. and Devonta Freeman each scored a touchdown in the third quarter to give Florida State a fourteen-point lead heading into the final quarter. In the fourth quarter, the Seminoles were held to two field goals from Roberto Aguayo, one with only a minute remaining, to secure the win over their rival.

Florida State amassed 517 yards of offense while the defense held the Hurricanes to 275 total yards and a season-low 14 points. Quarterback Jameis Winston completed 21 of 29 passes for 325 yards and one touchdown. Devonta Freeman led the team in both rushing and receiving with 23 carries for 78 yards and two touchdowns along with six receptions for 98 yards and one touchdown.

This was the 58th meeting between Florida State and Miami, the 8th meeting as conference opponents. The victory improved Florida State's all-time record against the Hurricanes to 27–31.

==== Wake Forest ====
Florida State at Wake Forest

| Team | 1 | 2 | 3 | 4 | Total |
|---|---|---|---|---|---|
| • #3 Seminoles | 21 | 21 | 10 | 7 | 59 |
| Demon Deacons | 0 | 0 | 0 | 3 | 3 |

- Date: November 9, 2013
- Location: BB&T Field
  Winston-Salem, North Carolina
- Game start: 12:06 p.m. EST
- Elapsed time: 3:21
- Game attendance: 30,865
- Game weather: 52 °F (11 °C); Wind: NNE 6mph, Partly cloudy
- Referee: Ron Cherry
- TV announcers (ABC): Mike Patrick (play-by-play), Ed Cunningham (color analyst), Jeannine Edwards (sideline)

Scoring summary
| 1 | 7:15 | FSU | James Wilder Jr. 5 yd run (Roberto Aguayo kick); 13 plays, 80 yards, TOP 5:48 | FSU 7–0 |
| 1 | 6:25 | FSU | Devonta Freeman 1 yd run (Roberto Aguayo kick); 2 plays, 2 yards, TOP 0:41 | FSU 14–0 |
| 1 | 2:10 | FSU | Kelvin Benjamin 18 yd pass from Jameis Winston (Roberto Aguayo kick); 2 plays, 15 yards, TOP 0:47 | FSU 21–0 |
| 2 | 14:15 | FSU | Nate Andrews 56 yd interception return (Roberto Aguayo kick) | FSU 28–0 |
| 2 | 13:56 | FSU | Jalen Ramsey 23 yd fumble recovery (Roberto Aguayo kick) | FSU 35–0 |
| 2 | 00:11 | FSU | Chad Abram 2 yd pass from Jameis Winston (Roberto Aguayo kick); 8 plays, 57 yards, TOP 1:36 | FSU 42–0 |
| 3 | 12:03 | FSU | Karlos Williams 5 yd run (Roberto Aguayo kick); 1 play, 5 yards, TOP 0:07 | FSU 49–0 |
| 3 | 8:24 | FSU | Roberto Aguayo 42 yd field goal; 6 plays, 15 yards, TOP 2:23 | FSU 52–0 |
| 4 | 9:07 | WF | Hedlund, C 23 yd field goal; 12 plays, 48 yards, TOP 5:00 | FSU 52–3 |
| 4 | 8:52 | FSU | Kermit Whitfield 97 yd kickoff return (Roberto Aguayo kick) | FSU 59–3 |

Florida State Leads Series: 24 – 6 – 1

Florida State traveled to face the Wake Forest Demon Deacons. In 2012, Florida State shutout the Demon Deacons, 52–0, in Tallahassee. When the Seminoles last traveled to Winston-Salem in 2011, they were upset by the Demon Deacons 35–30, part of a three-game skid for the Noles.

The defense totaled a school record seven turnovers in a rout of Wake Forest, 59–3.

After holding Wake Forest on the first drive of the game, Florida State scored on their first possession to take the lead. Following their opening drive, Terrence Smith intercepted Tanner Price's pass and set up Devonta Freeman to score on a one-yard touchdown run. Price was then picked off again by Mario Edwards Jr. to set up another rushing touchdown from Karlos Williams. In the second quarter, the Florida State defense continued their impressive performance when Nate Andrews returned an interception for a touchdown. On the next play, Jalen Ramsey returned a fumble for a touchdown. The offense put together another drive to go up by 42 points before halftime.

Another interception would lead to a touchdown at the start of the second half. A field goal extended the lead to 52 going into the final quarter. Wake Forest's only points of the game came courtesy of a field goal in the fourth. Florida State would add a score on special teams with a sixty-two yard punt return.

Florida State amassed 296 yards of offense, the lowest output of the season, while the defense held the Deacons to 166 total yards. Quarterback Jameis Winston completed 17 of 28 passes for 159 yards and two touchdowns, leading the team in passing. Karlos Williams led the team in rushing with 12 carries for 49 yards and a touchdown. Rashad Greene led the team in receiving with 5 receptions for 47 yards.

This was the 32nd meeting between Florida State and Wake Forest, the 22nd meeting as conference opponents. The victory improved Florida State's all-time record against the Demon Deacons to 25–6–1. With the win, Florida State claimed the division title and clinched a berth in the conference championship game.

==== Syracuse ====
Syracuse at Florida State

| Team | 1 | 2 | 3 | 4 | Total |
|---|---|---|---|---|---|
| Orange | 0 | 0 | 0 | 3 | 3 |
| • #2 Seminoles | 28 | 10 | 21 | 0 | 59 |

- Date: November 16, 2013
- Location: Doak Campbell Stadium
  Tallahassee, Florida
- Game start: 3:36 p.m. EST
- Elapsed time: 3:11
- Game attendance: 74,491
- Game weather: 74 °F (23 °C); Wind: SSE 5mph, Mostly cloudy
- Referee: Jeff Flanagan
- TV announcers (ABC/ESPN2): Mike Patrick (play-by-play), Ed Cunningham (color analyst), Jeannine Edwards (sideline)

Scoring summary
| 1 | 12:29 | FSU | James Wilder Jr. 3 yd run (Roberto Aguayo kick); 6 plays, 77 yards, TOP 2:31 | FSU 7–0 |
| 1 | 10:41 | FSU | Kermit Whitfield 74 yd run (Roberto Aguayo kick); 1 play, 74 yards, TOP 0:13 | FSU 14–0 |
| 1 | 4:41 | FSU | Devonta Freeman 4 yd run (Roberto Aguayo kick); 6 plays, 79 yards, TOP 2:50 | FSU 21–0 |
| 1 | 00:40 | FSU | Rashad Greene 6 yd pass from Jameis Winston (Roberto Aguayo kick); 4 plays, 39 yards, TOP 1:32 | FSU 28–0 |
| 2 | 11:52 | FSU | Kelvin Benjamin 6 yd pass from Jameis Winston (Roberto Aguayo kick); 7 plays, 79 yards, TOP 1:39 | FSU 35–0 |
| 2 | 5:07 | FSU | Roberto Aguayo 53 yd field goal; 5 plays, 16 yards, TOP 1:37 | FSU 38–0 |
| 3 | 10:51 | FSU | James Wilder Jr. 37 yd run (Roberto Aguayo kick); 3 plays, 46 yards, TOP 1:15 | FSU 45–0 |
| 3 | 7:45 | FSU | Nick O'Leary 17 yd pass from Sean Maguire (Roberto Aguayo kick); 4 plays, 83 yards, TOP 1:31 | FSU 52–0 |
| 3 | 5:47 | FSU | Chris Casher 31 yd fumble recovery (Roberto Aguayo kick) | FSU 59–0 |
| 4 | 7:42 | SYR | Ryan Norton 32 yd field goal; 20 plays, 66 yards, TOP 10:01 | FSU 59–3 |

Florida State Leads Series: 5 – 1

In the final conference game of the year, Florida State faced the Syracuse Orange. The teams last met during the 2005 season in Tallahassee, a 38–14 win for the Seminoles.

On a day when the 1993 national title team was recognized to honor the twentieth anniversary of Florida State's first national championship, the Seminoles continued their own run by defeating Syracuse 59–3.

The Seminoles seized control of the game, scoring on the first drive of the game with a six-play drive culminating in a three-yard touchdown run from James Wilder, Jr. to put the Seminoles up early. Florida State went on to score on three straight possessions, with touchdown runs from Levonte Whitfield and Devonta Freeman and a touchdown throw from Jameis Winston to Rashad Greene, to put the Seminoles up by twenty-eight going into the second quarter. Florida State scored on their first possession in the second as well courtesy of a Jameis Winston pass to Kelvin Benjamin. The Seminoles extended their lead with a 53-yard field goal from Roberto Aguayo to go into halftime with a 38–0 lead.

To open the third quarter, Florida State forced Syracuse to punt. James Wilder, Jr. then ran for a touchdown to put the Seminoles up by forty-five. The Seminoles scored on their next possession with a seventeen-yard pass from Sean Maguire to Nick O'Leary. After forcing a fumble, Chris Casher returned the ball thirty-one yards for a touchdown. Going into the final quarter, the Seminoles held a fifty-nine point lead while the Orange had yet to score. Syracuse would get their first points of the game as a result of a ten-minute drive that ended in a field goal. With the clock ticking down, Florida State held Syracuse in the end zone to preserve a fifty-six point homecoming win.

Florida State amassed 523 yards of offense while the defense held the Orange to 247 total yards. Amid speculation of an alleged sexual assault, quarterback Jameis Winston completed 19 of 21 passes for 277 yards and two touchdowns, leading the team in passing; backup quarterback Sean Maguire, who played for much of the second half, also threw for a touchdown. Karlos Williams led the team in rushing with 4 carries for 78 yards. Kenny Shaw led the team in receiving with 7 receptions for 99 yards.

This was the 7th meeting between Florida State and Syracuse, the 1st meeting as conference opponents. The victory improved Florida State's all-time record against the Orange to 6–1. Florida State finished the season with an unbeaten conference record for the eighth time in school history, the first time since 2000.

==== Idaho ====
Idaho at Florida State

| Team | 1 | 2 | 3 | 4 | Total |
|---|---|---|---|---|---|
| Vandals | 0 | 7 | 0 | 7 | 14 |
| • #2 Seminoles | 21 | 21 | 17 | 21 | 80 |

- Date: November 23, 2013
- Location: Doak Campbell Stadium
  Tallahassee, Florida
- Game start: 3:35 p.m. EST
- Elapsed time: 3:40
- Game attendance: 65,061
- Game weather: 75 °F (24 °C); Wind: NW 10mph, Cloudy, 30% rain
- Referee: Walt Davenport
- TV announcers (ESPNU): Anish Shroff (play-by-play), Kelly Stouffer (color analyst), Kaylee Hartung (sideline), Mark Schwarz (reporter)

Scoring summary
| 1 | 9:58 | FSU | Devonta Freeman 60 yd run (Roberto Aguayo kick); 7 plays, 82 yards, TOP 2:44 | FSU 7–0 |
| 1 | 5:18 | FSU | Kelvin Benjamin 32 yd pass from Jameis Winston (Roberto Aguayo kick); 5 plays, 73 yards, TOP 2:02 | FSU 14–0 |
| 1 | 3:05 | FSU | Telvin Smith 79 yd interception return (Roberto Aguayo kick) | FSU 21–0 |
| 2 | 12:48 | FSU | Kenny Shaw 46 yd pass from Jameis Winston (Roberto Aguayo kick); 5 plays, 44 yards, TOP 2:04 | FSU 28–0 |
| 2 | 5:54 | FSU | James Wilder Jr. 1 yd run (Roberto Aguayo kick); 5 plays, 85 yards, TOP 1:33 | FSU 35–0 |
| 2 | 00:41 | IDA | R Montgomery 15 yd pass from Taylor Davis (Austin Rehkow kick); 10 plays, 63 yards, TOP 1:44 | FSU 35–7 |
| 2 | 00:04 | FSU | Kenny Shaw 20 yd pass from Jameis Winston (Roberto Aguayo kick); 6 plays, 35 yards, TOP 0:29 | FSU 42–7 |
| 3 | 13:11 | FSU | Kelvin Benjamin 21 yd pass from Jameis Winston (Roberto Aguayo kick); 5 plays, 45 yards, TOP 1:43 | FSU 49–7 |
| 3 | 11:34 | FSU | Karlos Williams 4 yd run (Roberto Aguayo kick); 4 plays, 61 yards, TOP 0:47 | FSU 56–7 |
| 3 | 3:07 | FSU | Roberto Aguayo 42 yd field goal; 14 plays, 65 yards, TOP 5:32 | FSU 59–7 |
| 4 | 14:25 | FSU | Karlos Williams 25 yd run (Roberto Aguayo kick); 6 plays, 64 yards, TOP 2:21 | FSU 66–7 |
| 4 | 7:18 | FSU | Ryan Green 2 yd pass from Sean Maguire (Roberto Aguayo kick); 3 plays, 7 yards, TOP 1:20 | FSU 73–7 |
| 3 | 4:19 | FSU | E.J. Levenberry 78 yd interception return (Roberto Aguayo kick) | FSU 80–7 |
| 4 | 00:42 | IDA | Najee Lovett 14 yd pass from Josh McCain (Austin Rehkow kick); 9 plays, 75 yards, TOP 3:37 | FSU 80–14 |

Series Tied: 0 – 0

For their final home game of the season, Florida State faced the independent Idaho Vandals. In the first meeting between the two, Florida State set a school record for points scored with an 80–14 victory over the Vandals.

The Seminoles dominated the game from the start, scoring the game's first thirty-five points. Florida State's first score came courtesy of a rushing touchdown from Devonta Freeman. This was followed up by a touchdown run from Kelvin Benjamin. Telvin Smith returned an interception seventy-one yards for another touchdown to put the Noles up by three scores at the end of the first quarter. Florida State built on their lead in the second quarter with a passing touchdown from Jameis Winston to Kenny Shaw and a rushing touchdown from James Wilder, Jr. to give the Seminoles a commanding lead. Idaho got on the board with a ten-play drive that ended with a passing touchdown. In the final seconds of the first half, Florida State scored with a passing touchdown to Kenny Shaw. The Seminoles went into halftime, leading 42–7.

Florida State scored on the opening drive of the second half with a pass to Kelvin Benjamin. Karlos Williams rushed for a touchdown on the Seminole's next possession. A 42-yard field goal from Roberto Aguayo extended the lead going into the fourth. In the final quarter, Florida State scored two more touchdowns, a rush from Karlos Williams and a pass from backup Sean Maguire to Ryan Green. Idaho completed a nine-play drive that resulted in a touchdown as the game wound down.

Florida State amassed 645 yards of offense while the defense held the Vandals to 345 total yards. Quarterback Jameis Winston completed 14 of 25 passes for 225 yards and four touchdowns, leading the team in passing. Devonta Freeman led the team in rushing with 11 carries for 129 yards and one touchdown. Kenny Shaw led the team in receiving with 5 receptions for 107 yards and two touchdowns.

==== Florida ====
Florida State at Florida (Florida–Florida State football rivalry)

| Team | 1 | 2 | 3 | 4 | Total |
|---|---|---|---|---|---|
| • #2 Seminoles | 3 | 14 | 10 | 10 | 37 |
| Gators | 0 | 0 | 0 | 7 | 7 |

- Date: November 30, 2013
- Location: Ben Hill Griffin Stadium
  Gainesville, Florida
- Game start: 12:02 p.m. EST
- Elapsed time: 3:07
- Game attendance: 90,454
- Game weather: 63 °F (17 °C); Wind: NNW 16mph, Cloudy, 77% humidity
- Referee: Matt Loeffler
- TV announcers (ESPN/Sun Sports): Dave Pasch (play-by-play), Brian Griese (color analyst), Tom Luginbill (sideline)

Scoring summary
| 1 | 3:43 | FSU | Roberto Aguayo 49 yd field goal; 8 plays, 35 yards, TOP 4:00 | FSU 3–0 |
| 2 | 4:24 | FSU | Kelvin Benjamin 45 yd pass from Jameis Winston (Roberto Aguayo kick); 12 plays, 96 yards, TOP 5:51 | FSU 10–0 |
| 2 | 00:25 | FSU | Kelvin Benjamin 29 yd pass from Jameis Winston (Roberto Aguayo kick); 6 plays, 74 yards, TOP 1:42 | FSU 17–0 |
| 3 | 11:02 | FSU | Roberto Aguayo 40 yd field goal; 6 plays, 16 yards, TOP 2:36 | FSU 20–0 |
| 3 | 7:08 | FSU | Devonta Freeman 11 yd run (Roberto Aguayo kick); 5 plays, 84 yards, TOP 1:43 | FSU 27–0 |
| 4 | 13:39 | UF | Hunter Joyer 5 yd pass from Skyler Mornhinweg (Francisco Velez kick); 14 plays, 83 yards, TOP 8:29 | FSU 27–7 |
| 4 | 8:06 | FSU | Kelvin Benjamin 4 yd pass from Jameis Winston (Roberto Aguayo kick); 10 plays, 79 yards, TOP 5:33 | FSU 34–7 |
| 4 | 3:14 | FSU | Roberto Aguayo 28 yd field goal; 6 plays, 21 yards, TOP 3:38 | FSU 37–7 |

Florida Leads Series: 34 – 21 – 2

Florida State traveled to Gainesville for their annual rivalry game with the Florida Gators, who were in the midst of their worst season since 1979, in the regular season finale. In 2012, Florida was victorious with a 37–26 win over the Seminoles in Tallahassee after Florida State blew a late lead. The Seminoles last traveled to Gainesville in 2011, where Florida State beat the Gators 21–7 in a turnover filled game.

In the final regular season game, Florida State defeated their archrival, 37–7, marking the Seminoles' third win in the last four games against the Gators.

The Seminoles started off sluggish against the Gators, scoring only three points in the first quarter. The offense was more productive in the second quarter, scoring their first touchdown of the game when Jameis Winston completed a 45-yd pass to Kelvin Benjamin to put them up by ten. Just before the half, Winston completed a 29-yd pass to Kelvin Benjamin for a touchdown to give the Noles a seventeen-point lead at halftime. Despite the offensive struggles, the defense held the Gators scoreless in the first half.

Early in the third quarter, Florida State capitalized on a Florida fumble, scoring three more points on a 40-yd field goal. Florida State extended their lead when Devonta Freeman rushed 11 yards for a touchdown to give the Seminoles a twenty-seven point advantage. Florida scored their first points of the game in the fourth quarter courtesy of a 5-yd pass from third-string quarterback Skyler Mornhinweg to Hunter Joyer. Florida State responded with a 4-yd pass from Winston to Benjamin. The final score of the game would come from Roberto Aguayo who kicked 28-yd field goal to give the Seminoles a thirty-point win over the rival Gators. Because of their victory over Florida, along with their earlier victory over Miami, the Seminoles were awarded the Florida Cup.

Florida State amassed 456 yards of offense while the defense held the Gators to 193 total yards. Quarterback Jameis Winston completed 19 of 31 passes for 327 yards and three touchdowns, leading the team in passing. James Wilder, Jr. led the team in rushing with 10 carries for 63 yards. Kelvin Benjamin led the team in receiving with 9 receptions for 212 yards and three touchdowns.

This was the 58th meeting between Florida State and Florida, making it one of the most-played rivalries in college football. The victory improved Florida State's all-time record against the Gators to 22–34–2. Florida State also completed their first undefeated regular season since 1999.

==== ACC Championship: Duke ====
Duke vs Florida State (ACC Championship Game)

| Team | 1 | 2 | 3 | 4 | Total |
|---|---|---|---|---|---|
| #20 Blue Devils | 0 | 0 | 0 | 7 | 7 |
| • #1 Seminoles | 0 | 17 | 21 | 7 | 45 |

- Date: December 7, 2013
- Location: Bank of America Stadium
  Charlotte, North Carolina
- Game start: 8:16 p.m. EST
- Elapsed time: 3:18
- Game attendance: 67,694
- Game weather: 50 °F (10 °C); Wind: ENE 10mph, Cloudy
- Referee: David Epperley
- TV announcers (ABC): Brent Musburger (play-by-play), Kirk Herbstreit (color analyst), Heather Cox (sideline)

Scoring summary
| 2 | 12:36 | FSU | Kelvin Benjamin 14 yd pass from Jameis Winston (Roberto Aguayo kick); 9 plays, 64 yards, TOP 4:03 | FSU 7–0 |
| 2 | 3:37 | FSU | Karlos Williams 12 yd run (Roberto Aguayo kick); 11 plays, 73 yards, TOP 5:01 | FSU 14–0 |
| 2 | 00:25 | FSU | Roberto Aguayo 45 yd field goal; 7 plays, 53 yards, TOP 0:58 | FSU 17–0 |
| 3 | 9:52 | FSU | Kenny Shaw 11 yd pass from Jameis Winston (Roberto Aguayo kick); 3 plays, 26 yards, TOP 1:01 | FSU 24–0 |
| 3 | 6:31 | FSU | Kelvin Benjamin 54 yd pass from Jameis Winston (Roberto Aguayo kick); 5 plays, 87 yards, TOP 1:49 | FSU 31–0 |
| 3 | 3:38 | FSU | Jameis Winston 17 yd run (Roberto Aguayo kick); 4 plays, 61 yards, TOP 1:25 | FSU 38–0 |
| 4 | 7:25 | FSU | Devonta Freeman 7 yd run (Roberto Aguayo kick); 9 plays, 92 yards, TOP 4:33 | FSU 45–0 |
| 4 | 1:01 | DUKE | Josh Snead 5 yd run (Ross Martin kick); 14 plays, 75 yards, TOP 6:24 | FSU 45–7 |

Florida State Leads Series: 18 – 0

By virtue of winning the Atlantic Division, Florida State played in the ACC Championship Game in Charlotte. This marked the Seminoles' fourth appearance in the conference championship game and their fifth division title. Florida State's most recent appearance in the game came in 2012 when they won the conference title. The Seminoles faced the Coastal Division champion, the Duke Blue Devils.

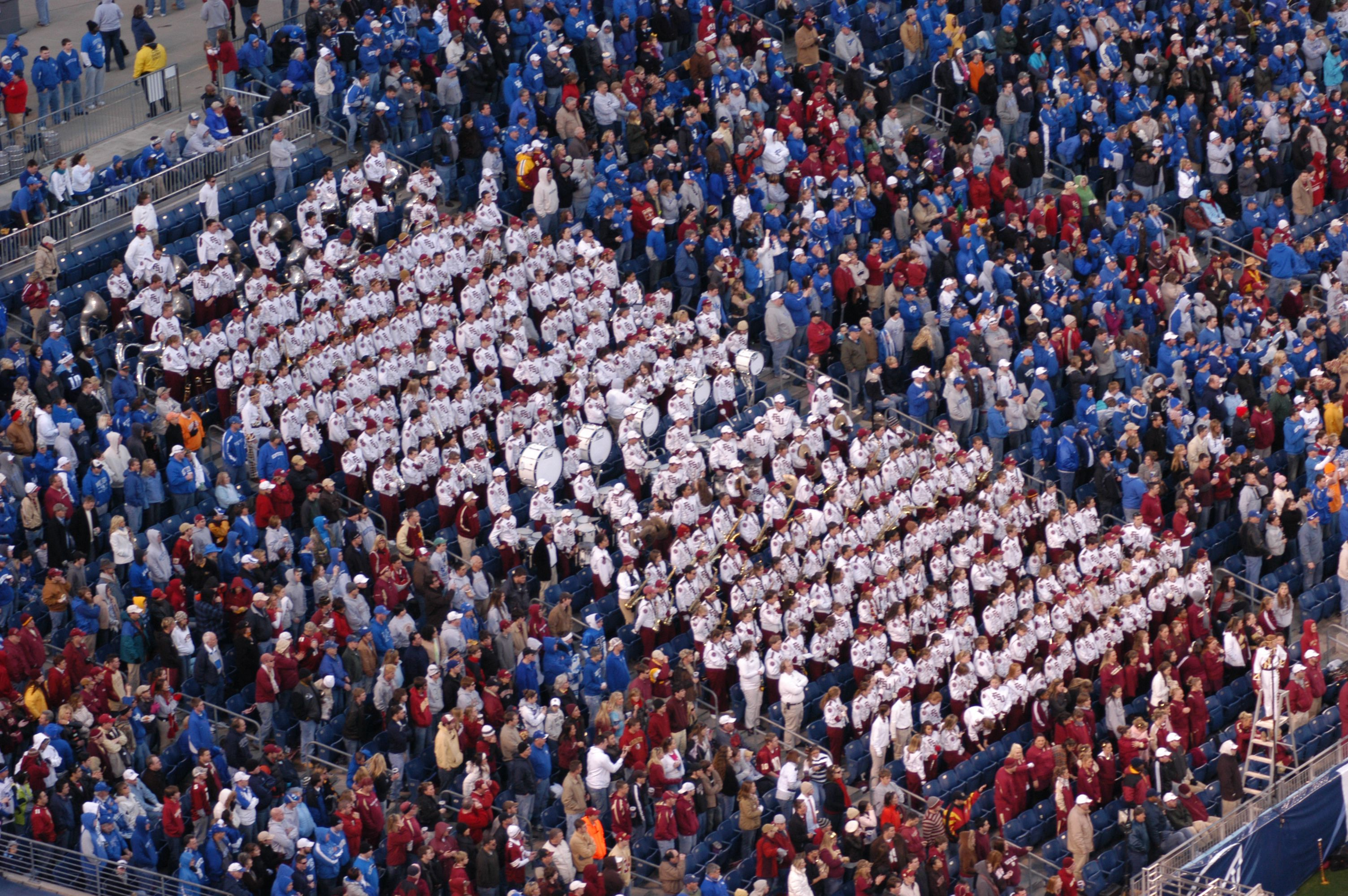
Marching Chiefs at the ACC Championship Game

The Seminoles won the ACC title, defeating the Blue Devils, 45–7, earning a spot to play in the BCS National Championship Game as the only undefeated team left in the country.

Florida State was held scoreless in the first quarter for the first time all season. The Seminoles scored the first points of the game with a fourteen-yard pass to Kelvin Benjamin to put the Noles up by a touchdown. After being forced to punt on their next possession, Florida State scored with a rushing touchdown from Karlos Williams. A field goal before the half put Florida State up by seventeen.

Florida State began to seize control of the game in the second half. An interception turned into points with a pass to Kenny Shaw. The Seminoles scored on their next drive courtesy of a pass to Kelvin Benjamin. Nate Andrews forced a fumble which the Seminoles converted into points when Winston rushed seventeen yards for a touchdown. In the fourth quarter, Devonta Freeman rushed for a touchdown while Duke scored their only points of the game in the final minute with a five-yard rushing touchdown.

Florida State amassed 569 yards of offense while the defense held the Blue Devils to 239 total yards. Quarterback Jameis Winston completed 19 of 32 passes for 330 yards and three touchdowns, leading the team in passing. Devonta Freeman led the team in rushing with 18 carries for 91 yards and a touchdown. Kelvin Benjamin led the team in receiving with 5 receptions for 119 yards and two touchdowns.

This was the 19th meeting between Florida State and Duke. The victory improved Florida State's all-time record against the Blue Devils to 19–0.

==== BCS Championship: Auburn ====
Auburn vs Florida State (BCS National Championship Game)

| Team | 1 | 2 | 3 | 4 | Total |
|---|---|---|---|---|---|
| #2 Tigers | 7 | 14 | 0 | 10 | 31 |
| • #1 Seminoles | 3 | 7 | 3 | 21 | 34 |

- Date: January 6, 2014
- Location: Rose Bowl Stadium
  Pasadena, California
- Game start: 8:33 p.m. EST
- Elapsed time: 3:31
- Game attendance: 94,208
- Game weather: 69 °F (21 °C); Wind: W 4mph, Partly cloudy
- Referee: John O'Neill
- TV announcers (ESPN/ESPN Radio): Brent Musburger (play-by-play), Kirk Herbstreit (color analyst), Heather Cox, and Tom Rinaldi (sidelines)/Mike Tirico (play-by-play), Todd Blackledge, (color analyst), Holly Rowe, and Joe Schad (sidelines)

Scoring summary
| 1 | 9:53 | FSU | Roberto Aguayo 35 yd field goal; 9 plays, 59 yards, TOP 3:38 | FSU 3–0 |
| 1 | 3:07 | AUB | Tre Mason 12 yd pass from Nick Marshall (Cody Parkey kick); 6 plays, 25 yards, TOP 2:11 | AUB 7–3 |
| 2 | 13:48 | AUB | Melvin Ray 50 yd pass from Nick Marshall (Cody Parkey kick); 3 plays, 85 yards, TOP 1:01 | AUB 14–3 |
| 2 | 5:01 | AUB | Nick Marshall 4 yd run (Cody Parkey kick); 6 plays, 27 yards, TOP 2:19 | AUB 21–3 |
| 2 | 1:28 | FSU | Devonta Freeman 3 yd run (Roberto Aguayo kick); 11 plays, 66 yards, TOP 3:27 | AUB 21–10 |
| 3 | 6:05 | FSU | Roberto Aguayo 41 yd field goal; 11 plays, 67 yards, TOP 5:30 | AUB 21–13 |
| 4 | 10:55 | FSU | Chad Abram 11 yd pass from Jameis Winston (Roberto Aguayo kick); 5 plays, 56 yards, TOP 2:01 | AUB 21–20 |
| 4 | 4:42 | AUB | Cody Parkey 22 yd field goal; 13 plays, 69 yards, TOP 6:13 | AUB 24–20 |
| 4 | 4:31 | FSU | Levonte Whitfield 100 yd kickoff return (Roberto Aguayo kick) | FSU 27–24 |
| 4 | 1:19 | AUB | Tre Mason 37 yd run (Cody Parkey kick); 8 plays, 75 yards, TOP 3:12 | AUB 31–27 |
| 4 | 00:13 | FSU | Kelvin Benjamin 2 yd pass from Jameis Winston (Roberto Aguayo kick); 7 plays, 80 yards, TOP 0:58 | FSU 34–31 |

Auburn Leads Series: 13 – 4 – 1

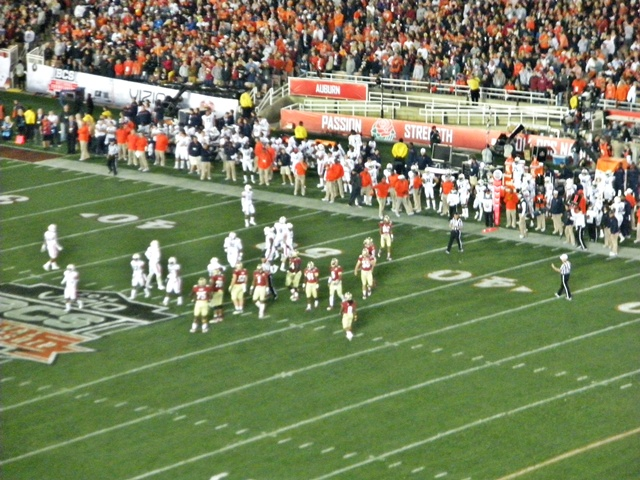
The Florida State Seminoles won their third national title by defeating the Auburn Tigers at the Rose Bowl.

In the national championship game, Florida State faced the Auburn Tigers, champions of the SEC.

The Seminoles captured their third national title by defeating Auburn, 34–31, at the Rose Bowl.

After Florida State scored a field goal on their first drive, Auburn responded with a touchdown in the first quarter and two in the second to storm out to a 21–3 lead. After a successful punt fake, the Seminoles managed a late touchdown before the half to go into the locker room down 21–10, marking the first halftime deficit of the season for the Seminoles.

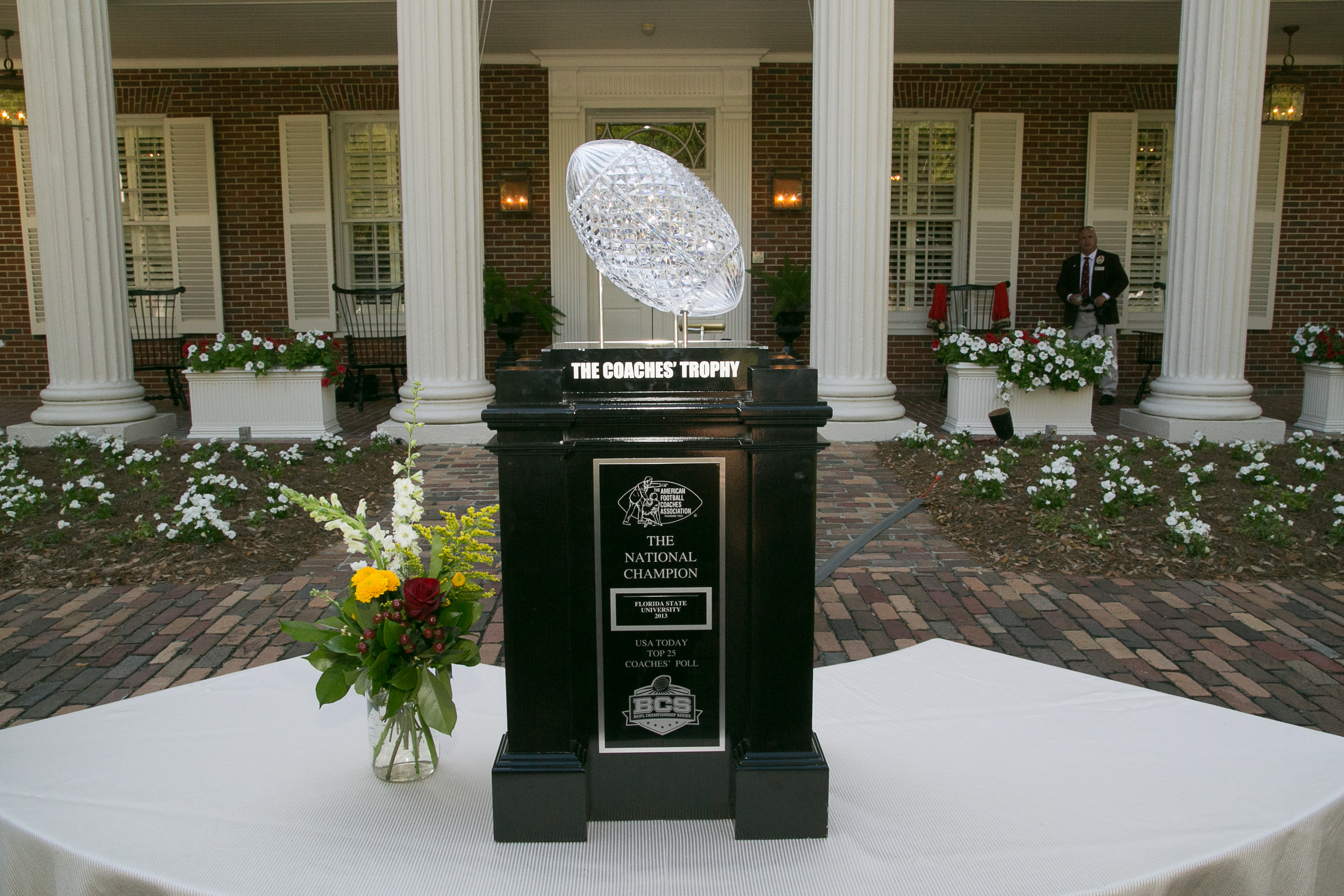
For their win in the national title game, FSU received the Coaches' Trophy.

Both teams dominated on defense in the third quarter with the Seminoles hitting a field goal to cut the lead to eight. In the fourth quarter, Florida State scored a touchdown early to make it a one-point game. After Auburn made a field goal, Kermit Whitfield returned the following kickoff 100 yards to give the Seminoles a three-point lead. Auburn answered with a touchdown to go up by four with just over a minute remaining. On their final drive of seven plays, Florida State scored a touchdown with thirteen seconds remaining, benefiting from a 49-yard completion to Rashad Greene to bring them into scoring position with less than a minute to play. The Seminoles emerged victorious to complete a perfect season and end the SEC's streak of seven consecutive BCS titles.

Florida State amassed 385 yards of offense but was outgained by Auburn. The defense allowed 449 total yards with running back Tre Mason accounting for 195 yards. Despite an unproductive first half, quarterback Jameis Winston completed 20 of 35 passes for 237 yards and two touchdowns, leading the team in passing. Devonta Freeman led the team in rushing with 11 carries for 73 yards and a touchdown and also passed the 1,000 yard mark for the season. Rashad Greene led the team in receiving with 9 receptions for 147 yards.

This was the 19th meeting between Florida State and Auburn. The victory improved Florida State's all-time record against the Tigers to 5–13–1.

== Awards ==
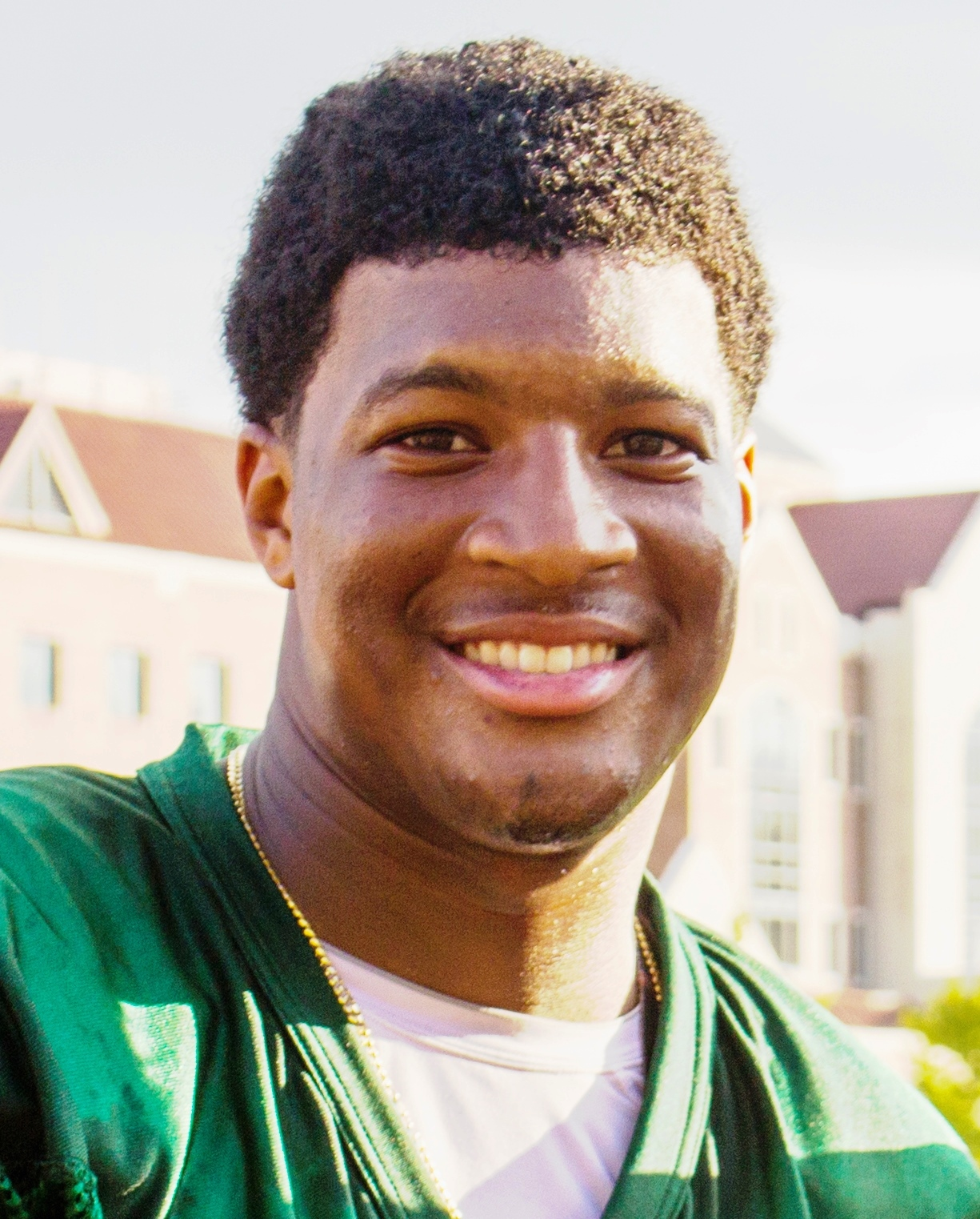
Quarterback Jameis Winston became the third Florida State player to win the Heisman.

- Heisman Trophy

Jameis Winston

- Walter Camp Award

Jameis Winston

- Davey O'Brien Award

Jameis Winston

- Lou Groza Award

Roberto Aguayo

- Rimington Trophy

Bryan Stork

- Manning Award

Jameis Winston

- Associated Press Player of the Year

Jameis Winston

- AFCA Coach of the Year

Jimbo Fisher

=== Conference awards ===
- Jacobs Blocking Trophy

Cameron Erving

- ACC Rookie of the Year

Jameis Winston

- ACC Offensive Rookie of the Year

Jameis Winston

- ACC Offensive Player of the Year

Jameis Winston

- ACC Player of the Year

Jameis Winston

=== Watchlists ===
- Lott Trophy

Lamarcus Joyner

- Rimington Trophy

Bryan Stork

- Bednarik Award

Timmy Jernigan
Christian Jones
Lamarcus Joyner

- John Mackey Award

Nick O'Leary

- Outland Trophy

Cameron Erving
Tre Jackson
Timmy Jernigan
Bryan Stork

- Nagurski Award

Timmy Jernigan
Christian Jones
Lamarcus Joyner

- Jim Thorpe Award

Lamarcus Joyner

- Butkus Award

Christian Jones
Telvin Smith

- Lombardi Award

Tre Jackson
Timmy Jernigan
Christian Jones

- Biletnikoff Award

Rashad Greene

=== Semifinalists ===
Players

- Maxwell Award

Jameis Winston

- Bednarik Award

Lamarcus Joyner

- Lou Groza Award

Roberto Aguayo

- Davey O'Brien Award

Jameis Winston

- Walter Camp Award

Jameis Winston

- John Mackey Award

Nick O'Leary

- Outland Trophy

Bryan Stork

- Nagurski Trophy

Lamarcus Joyner

Coaches

- Bear Bryant Award

Jimbo Fisher

- Maxwell Coach of the Year Award

Jimbo Fisher

=== Finalists ===
Players

- Maxwell Award

Jameis Winston

- Davey O'Brien Award

Jameis Winston

- John Mackey Award

Nick O'Leary

- Jim Thorpe Award

Lamarcus Joyner

- Lou Groza Award

Roberto Aguayo

- Manning Award

Jameis Winston

- Walter Camp Award

Jameis Winston

- Rimington Trophy

Bryan Stork

- Nagurski Trophy

Lamarcus Joyner

- Heisman Trophy

Jameis Winston

Coaches

- Broyles Award

Jeremy Pruitt

- Eddie Robinson Coach of the Year

Jimbo Fisher

- Bobby Bowden Coach of the Year

Jimbo Fisher

=== Honors ===
- CFPA Freshman Performance of the Year

Jameis Winston

==== All-ACC ====
Seventeen players from Florida State were honored as All-ACC selections by the Atlantic Coast Sports Media Association:

- First Team

Jameis Winston
Devonta Freeman
Rashad Greene
Cameron Erving
Tre' Jackson
Bryan Stork
Lamarcus Joyner

- Second Team

Nick O'Leary
Timmy Jernigan
Telvin Smith
Christian Jones
Terrence Brooks
Roberto Aguayo

- Third Team

Kelvin Benjamin
Josue Matías
Mario Edwards Jr.
Nate Andrews

- Honorable Mentions

James Wilder Jr.
Kenny Shaw
Bobby Hart
Terrance Smith
P. J. Williams

Eighteen players from Florida State were also honored as All-ACC selections by the coaches:

- First Team

Jameis Winston
Devonta Freeman
Rashad Greene
Cameron Erving
Tre' Jackson
Bryan Stork
Timmy Jernigan
Telvin Smith
Lamarcus Joyner
Terrence Brooks
Roberto Aguayo

- Second Team

Kelvin Benjamin
Nick O'Leary
Josue Matías
Christian Jones

- Third Team

Kenny Shaw
Mario Edwards Jr.

- Honorable Mentions

Bobby Hart

==== All-Americans ====
- Jameis Winston (consensus)
- Cameron Erving
- Lamarcus Joyner (consensus)
- Roberto Aguayo
- Timmy Jernigan
- Bryan Stork (consensus)
- Kelvin Benjamin
- Tre' Jackson
- Telvin Smith
- Terrence Brooks

=== All-star games ===
| Game | Date | Site | Players |
|---|---|---|---|
| 65th Senior Bowl | January 25, 2014 | Ladd–Peebles Stadium, Mobile, Alabama | Terrence Brooks, Telvin Smith, Christian Jones, Bryan Stork |

| Game | Date | Site | Players |
|---|---|---|---|
| 89th East–West Shrine Game | January 18, 2014 | Tropicana Field, St. Petersburg, Florida | Demonte McAllister |

=== NFL Draft selections ===
Twenty-three players who were on the Seminoles this season were selected in the NFL draft:

| Player | Position | Round | Pick | Year | NFL team |
|---|---|---|---|---|---|
| Jameis Winston | Quarterback | 1 | 1 | 2015 | Tampa Bay Buccaneers |
| Jalen Ramsey | Cornerback | 1 | 5 | 2016 | Jacksonville Jaguars |
| Cameron Erving | Guard | 1 | 19 | 2015 | Cleveland Browns |
| Kelvin Benjamin | Wide receiver | 1 | 28 | 2014 | Carolina Panthers |
| Mario Edwards Jr. | Defensive end | 2 | 35 | 2015 | Oakland Raiders |
| Eddie Goldman | Defensive tackle | 2 | 39 | 2015 | Chicago Bears |
| Lamarcus Joyner | Safety | 2 | 41 | 2014 | St. Louis Rams |
| Timmy Jernigan | Defensive tackle | 2 | 48 | 2014 | Baltimore Ravens |
| Ronald Darby | Cornerback | 2 | 50 | 2015 | Buffalo Bills |
| DeMarcus Walker | Defensive end | 2 | 51 | 2017 | Denver Broncos |
| Roberto Aguayo | Kicker | 2 | 59 | 2016 | Tampa Bay Buccaneers |
| P. J. Williams | Cornerback | 3 | 78 | 2015 | New Orleans Saints |
| Terrence Brooks | Safety | 3 | 79 | 2014 | Baltimore Ravens |
| Devonta Freeman | Running back | 4 | 103 | 2014 | Atlanta Falcons |
| Bryan Stork | Center | 4 | 105 | 2014 | New England Patriots |
| Tre' Jackson | Guard | 4 | 111 | 2015 | New England Patriots |
| Rashad Greene | Wide receiver | 5 | 139 | 2015 | Jacksonville Jaguars |
| Telvin Smith | Linebacker | 5 | 144 | 2014 | Jacksonville Jaguars |
| Karlos Williams | Running back | 5 | 155 | 2015 | Buffalo Bills |
| Ukeme Eligwe | Linebacker | 5 | 183 | 2017 | Kansas City Chiefs |
| Nick O'Leary | Tight end | 6 | 194 | 2015 | Buffalo Bills |
| Marquez White | Cornerback | 6 | 216 | 2017 | Dallas Cowboys |
| Bobby Hart | Guard | 7 | 226 | 2015 | New York Giants |

Sixteen former players signed as undrafted free agents:

| Name | Position | Team |
|---|---|---|
| Christian Jones | Linebacker | Chicago Bears |
| James Wilder, Jr. | Running back | Cincinnati Bengals |
| Kenny Shaw | Wide receiver | Cleveland Browns |
| Demonte McAllister | Defensive lineman | Seattle Seahawks |
| Jacobbi McDaniel | Defensive tackle | Cleveland Browns |
| Chad Abram | Fullback | Detroit Lions |
| Josue Matias | Offensive lineman | Tennessee Titans |
| Jared Haggins | Wide receiver | Detroit Lions |
| Lamarcus Brutus | Defensive back | Tennessee Titans |
| Nile Lawrence-Stample | Defensive tackle | Cleveland Browns |
| Giorgio Newberry | Defensive lineman | Pittsburgh Steelers |
| Reggie Northrup | Linebacker | Washington Redskins |
| Terrance Smith | Linebacker | Kansas City Chiefs |
| Kermit Whitfield | Wide receiver | Chicago Bears |
| Jesus Wilson | Wide receiver | Tampa Bay Buccaneers |
| Freddie Stevenson | Running back | Chicago Bears |

Four former players have been chosen to go to the Pro Bowl:

| Name | Position | Year |
|---|---|---|
| Devonta Freeman | Running back | 2015, 2016 |
| Jalen Ramsey | Cornerback | 2017 |
| Telvin Smith | Linebacker | 2017 |
| Jameis Winston | Quarterback | 2015 |

=== ESPY awards ===
In recognition of their season, Florida State was nominated for two ESPY Awards.

| Award | Category | Nominee | Result |
|---|---|---|---|
| ESPY | Best Team | | Nominated |
| ESPY | Best Male College Athlete | Jameis Winston | Nominated |

== Roster ==
2013 Florida State Seminoles
| Quarterback: 5 Jameis Winston – (redshirt) freshman (6'4, 227); 10 Sean Maguire – (redshirt) freshman (6'3, 215); 11 John Franklin III – freshman (6'0, 171); 14 Jacob Coker – (redshirt) sophomore (6'5, 235); Running back: 7 Mario Pender – (redshirt) freshman (5'10, 192); 8 Devonta Freeman – junior (5'9, 209); 9 Karlos Williams – junior (6'1, 230); 24 Ryan Green – freshman (5'10, 195); 32 James Wilder Jr. – junior (6'2, 229); 33 Freddie Stevenson – freshman (6'1, 237); 41 Chad Abram – senior (6'0, 234); 43 Ebo Entsuah – sophomore (5'11, 245); 30 Keijofer Pittman – freshman (5'11, 240); 45 Will Burnham – sophomore (5'10, 174); Wide receiver: 1 Kelvin Benjamin – (redshirt) sophomore (6'5, 238); 3 Jesus Wilson – freshman (5'9, 177); 7 Kermit Whitfield – freshman (5'7, 178); 12 Jarred Haggins – senior (6'0, 193); 13 Rashad Gholston – (redshirt) junior (5'10, 167); 80 Rashad Greene – junior (6'0, 180); 81 Kenny Shaw – senior (6'0, 170); 84 Isaiah Jones – freshman (6'4, 200); 89 Christian Green – (redshirt) junior (6'2, 205); Tight end: 4 Giorgio Newberry – (redshirt) sophomore (6'6, 280); 33 Kevin Haplea – senior (6'4, 245); 35 Nick O'Leary – junior (6'3, 248); 85 Jeremy Kerr – freshman (6'5, 254); 42 Shayne Broxsie – (redshirt) senior (6'2, 260) | Offensive line: 51 Bobby Hart – junior (6'4, 315); 52 Bryan Stork – (redshirt) senior (6'4, 300); 53 Sterling Lovelady – junior (6'3, 291); 54 Tre' Jackson – junior (6'4, 330); 55 Ira Denson – freshman (6'3, 330); 59 Ryan Hoefield – freshman (6'3, 292); 60 Jacob Fahrenkrug – (redshirt) senior (6'4, 326); 62 Austin Barron – junior (6'3, 300); 65 Ruben Carter – (redshirt) sophomore (6'4, 309); 70 Josue Matías – junior (6'6, 322); 74 Jonathan Wallace – senior (6'7, 290); 75 Cameron Erving – (redshirt) junior (6'6, 320); 78 Wilson Bell – freshman (6'4, 314); 79 Michael Scheerhorn – sophomore (6'5, 270); Defensive line: 6 Dan Hicks – (redshirt) senior (6'4, 260); 8 Timmy Jernigan – junior (6'2, 294); 11 Derrick Mitchell – (redshirt) sophomore (6'4, 295); 15 Mario Edwards Jr. – sophomore (6'3, 277); 21 Chris Casher – (redshirt) freshman (6'4, 260); 43 Desmond Hollin – junior (6'3, 268); 44 DeMarcus Walker – freshman (6'3, 274); 55 Jacobbi McDaniel – (redshirt) senior (6'0, 295); 90 Eddie Goldman – sophomore (6'4, 313); 91 Pierre Jolicoeur– sophomore (6'0, 255); 92 Justin Shanks – (redshirt) freshman (6'2 313); 95 Keith Bryant – freshman (6'2, 312); 97 Demonte McAllister – (redshirt) senior (6'2, 298); 99 Nile Lawrence-Stample – (redshirt) sophomore (6'1, 313) | Linebacker: 5 Reggie Northrup – sophomore (6'1, 223); 7 Christian Jones – senior (6'4, 235); 10 E.J. Levenberry – freshman (6'3, 234); 12 Matthew Thomas – freshman (6'3, 210); 18 Ro'Derrick Hoskins – freshman (6'2, 216); 22 Telvin Smith – senior (6'3, 218); 24 Terrance Smith– (redshirt) sophomore (6'4, 220); 28 Nigel Terrell – Junior (6'1, 226); 52 Ukeme Eligwe – (redshirt) freshman (6'2, 240); 46 Paul Aloise – (redshirt) Junior (5'11, 225); Defensive back: 1 Tyler Hunter – junior (5'11, 197); 3 Ronald Darby – sophomore (5'11, 192); 14 Nick Waisome – junior (5'10, 176); 13 Jalen Ramsey – freshman (6'1, 195); 20 Lamarcus Joyner – senior (5'8, 190); 26 P. J. Williams – sophomore (6'0, 193); 27 Marquez White – freshman (6'0, 171); 29 Nate Andrews – freshman (5'11, 208); 30 Colin Blake – (redshirt) freshman (6'3, 214); 31 Terrence Brooks – senior (5'11, 200); 36 Tyrell Lyons – freshman (6'0, 210); 37 Keelin Smith – Sophomore (6'3, 185); 42 Lamarcus Brutus – (redshirt) sophomore (6'0, 202); Special teams: 19 Roberto Aguayo – (redshirt) freshman (K); 38 Cason Beatty – sophomore (P); 57 Philip Doumar – Redshirt Senior (LS); 16 Clay Pickler – Redshirt Sophomore (K); 40 Daniel Adams – Redshirt Junior (LS) |

=== Depth chart ===
Defense

FS
Terrence Brooks
Nate Andrews
Gerald Demps

| WLB | MLB | SLB |
|---|---|---|
| Ukeme Eligwe | Telvin Smith | Terrance Smith |
| ⋅ | E. J. Levenberry | Matthew Thomas |
| ⋅ | Ro'Derrick Hoskins | Paul Aloise |

SS
Jalen Ramsey
Tyler Hunter
Lamarcus Brutus

CB
Lamarcus Joyner
Ronald Darby
Keelin Smith

| DE | DT | DT | DE |
|---|---|---|---|
| Christian Jones | Eddie Goldman | Timmy Jernigan | Mario Edwards Jr. |
| Dan Hicks | Nile Lawrence-Stample | Jacobbi McDaniel | Chris Casher |
| Derrick Mitchell | Desmond Hollin | Pierre Jolicoeur | DeMarcus Walker |

CB
P. J. Williams
Marquez White
Nick Waisome

Offense

WR
Rashad Greene
Kenny Shaw
Jesus Wilson

| LT | LG | C | RG | RT |
|---|---|---|---|---|
| Cameron Erving | Josue Matías | Bryan Stork | Tre' Jackson | Bobby Hart |
| Wilson Bell | Jacob Fahrenkrug | Austin Barron | Ruben Carter | Jonathan Wallace |
| Michael Scheerhorn | Sterling Lovelady | Ryan Hoefield | Ira Denson | Michael Scheerhorn |

TE
Nick O'Leary
Giorgio Newberry
Kevin Haplea

WR
Kelvin Benjamin
Christian Green
Levonte Whitfield

QB
Jameis Winston
Jacob Coker
Sean Maguire

RB
Devonta Freeman*
James Wilder, Jr.*
Karlos Williams

FB
Chad Abram
Freddie Stevenson
Cam Ponder

Special teams
PK Roberto Aguayo
PK Clay Pickler
P Cason Beatty
KR Levonte Whitfield
Karlos Williams
Lamarcus Joyner
Rashad Greene
PR Kenny Shaw
Rashad Greene
Tyler Hunter
LS Philip Doumar
H Cason Beatty

=== Recruits ===
College recruiting
| Name | Hometown | School | Height | Weight | 40^{‡} | Commit date |
|---|---|---|---|---|---|---|
| Nate Andrews; ATH | Fairhope, Alabama | Fairhope HS | 6 ft 0 in (1.83 m) | 180 lb (82 kg) | N/A | Jan 25, 2013 |
| Nate Andrews; ATH | Recruit ratings: Scout: Rivals: (78) | | | | | |
| Wilson Bell; OL | Prichard, Alabama | Blount HS | 6 ft 4 in (1.93 m) | 296 lb (134 kg) | N/A | Feb 6, 2013 |
| Wilson Bell; OL | Recruit ratings: Scout: Rivals: (75) | | | | | |
| Davarez Bryant; DE | New Smyrna Beach, Florida | New Smyrna Beach HS | 6 ft 4 in (1.93 m) | 250 lb (110 kg) | 4.5 | Feb 6, 2013 |
| Davarez Bryant; DE | Recruit ratings: Scout: Rivals: (75) | | | | | |
| Keith Bryant; DT | Delray Beach, Florida | Atlantic HS | 6 ft 2 in (1.88 m) | 306 lb (139 kg) | N/A | Feb 6, 2013 |
| Keith Bryant; DT | Recruit ratings: Scout: Rivals: (83) | | | | | |
| Ira Denson; OL | Madison, Florida | Madison HS | 6 ft 4 in (1.93 m) | 317 lb (144 kg) | 5.67 | May 31, 2012 |
| Ira Denson; OL | Recruit ratings: Scout: Rivals: (84) | | | | | |
| John Franklin; QB | Plantation, Florida | South Plantation HS | 6 ft 1 in (1.85 m) | 171 lb (78 kg) | 4.38 | Nov 1, 2012 |
| John Franklin; QB | Recruit ratings: Scout: Rivals: (75) | | | | | |
| Ryan Green; RB | St. Petersburg, Florida | Catholic HS | 5 ft 10 in (1.78 m) | 187 lb (85 kg) | 4.45 | Jun 15, 2012 |
| Ryan Green; RB | Recruit ratings: Scout: Rivals: (88) | | | | | |
| Ryan Hoefeld; OL | New Orleans | Brother Martin HS | 6 ft 3 in (1.91 m) | 265 lb (120 kg) | 5.20 | Jul 2, 2012 |
| Ryan Hoefeld; OL | Recruit ratings: Scout: Rivals: (78) | | | | | |
| Desmond Hollin; DE | Brooklyn, New York | ASA College | 6 ft 4 in (1.93 m) | 265 lb (120 kg) | 4.65 | Dec 10, 2012 |
| Desmond Hollin; DE | Recruit ratings: Scout: Rivals: (76 (JC)) | | | | | |
| Ro'Derrick Hoskins; LB | Orlando, Florida | Evans HS | 6 ft 3 in (1.91 m) | 215 lb (98 kg) | N/A | Oct 4, 2012 |
| Ro'Derrick Hoskins; LB | Recruit ratings: Scout: Rivals: (83) | | | | | |
| Isaiah Jones; WR | Milton, Florida | Milton HS | 6 ft 4 in (1.93 m) | 194 lb (88 kg) | 4.69 | Jul 6, 2012 |
| Isaiah Jones; WR | Recruit ratings: Scout: Rivals: (83) | | | | | |
| Jeremy Kerr; TE | St. Petersburg, Florida | St. Petersburg HS | 6 ft 6 in (1.98 m) | 254 lb (115 kg) | N/A | Jan 23, 2013 |
| Jeremy Kerr; TE | Recruit ratings: Scout: Rivals: (71) | | | | | |
| E.J. Levenberry, Jr. LB | Woodbridge, Virginia | C.D. Hylton HS | 6 ft 3 in (1.91 m) | 226 lb (103 kg) | 4.6 | Apr 24, 2012 |
| E.J. Levenberry, Jr. LB | Recruit ratings: Scout: Rivals: (71) | | | | | |
| Tyrell Lyons; LB | Jacksonville, Florida | First Coast HS | 6 ft 2 in (1.88 m) | 220 lb (100 kg) | 4.50 | Feb 25, 2012 |
| Tyrell Lyons; LB | Recruit ratings: Scout: Rivals: (81) | | | | | |
| Jalen Ramsey; DB | Nashville, Tennessee | Brentwood Academy | 6 ft 0 in (1.83 m) | 190 lb (86 kg) | 4.54 | Jul 16, 2012 |
| Jalen Ramsey; DB | Recruit ratings: Scout: Rivals: (89) | | | | | |
| Freddie Stevenson; LB | Bartow, Florida | Bartow HS | 6 ft 1 in (1.85 m) | 220 lb (100 kg) | 4.54 | Jul 4, 2012 |
| Freddie Stevenson; LB | Recruit ratings: Scout: Rivals: (82) | | | | | |
| Matthew Thomas; LB | Miami, Florida | Booker T. Washington HS | 6 ft 3 in (1.91 m) | 205 lb (93 kg) | 4.59 | Feb 6, 2013 |
| Matthew Thomas; LB | Recruit ratings: Scout: Rivals: (90 (JC)) | | | | | |
| DeMarcus Walker; DE | Jacksonville, Florida | Sandalwood HS | 6 ft 4 in (1.93 m) | 280 lb (130 kg) | 5.04 | Jan 8, 2013 |
| DeMarcus Walker; DE | Recruit ratings: Scout: Rivals: (87) | | | | | |
| Marquez White; DB | Dothan, Alabama | Northview HS | 6 ft 1 in (1.85 m) | 180 lb (82 kg) | N/A | May 25, 2012 |
| Marquez White; DB | Recruit ratings: Scout: Rivals: (83) | | | | | |
| Levonte Whitfield; WR | Orlando, Florida | Jones HS | 5 ft 9 in (1.75 m) | 176 lb (80 kg) | 4.37 | Aug 13, 2012 |
| Levonte Whitfield; WR | Recruit ratings: Scout: Rivals: (85) | | | | | |
| Jesus Wilson; ATH | Miami | Columbus HS | 5 ft 9 in (1.75 m) | 165 lb (75 kg) | N/A | Jun 15, 2012 |
| Jesus Wilson; ATH | Recruit ratings: Scout: Rivals: (80) | | | | | |
Overall recruit ranking: Scout: 16 Rivals: 10 ESPN: 9
‡ Refers to 40-yard dash; Note: In many cases, Scout, Rivals, 247Sports, On3, and ESPN may conflict in their listings of height, weight and 40 time.; In these cases, the average was taken. ESPN grades are on a 100-point scale.; Sources: "Florida State 2013 Football Commitments". Rivals.; "2013 Florida State Commits". Scout.; "2013 Player Commitments – Florida State". ESPN.; "Scout.com Team Recruiting Rankings". Scout.; "2013 Team Ranking". Rivals.com.

==== Position key ====
| Back | B | Center | C | Cornerback | CB | Defensive back | DB |
| Defensive end | DE | Defensive lineman | DL | Defensive tackle | DT | End | E |
| Fullback | FB | Guard | G | Halfback | HB | Kicker | K |
| Kickoff returner | KR | Offensive tackle | OT | Offensive lineman | OL | Linebacker | LB |
| Long snapper | LS | Punter | P | Punt returner | PR | Quarterback | QB |
| Running back | RB | Safety | S | Tight end | TE | Wide receiver | WR |
