= Vero Beach High School =

Location
- 1707 16th Street; Vero Beach, Florida 32960-3626; United States; 27°37′46″N 80°24′14″W

Information
- Type: Public high school
- Motto: VBHS... Together We Achieve Success
- Established: 1905; 121 years ago (unofficially); 1925; 101 years ago (officially); 1963; 63 years ago (Main Campus Location)
- School district: Indian River County School District
- Principal: Rachel Finnegan
- Teaching staff: 123.80 (FTE) (2022–23)
- Grades: 9–12
- Gender: Co-educational
- Enrollment: 2,783 (2023–24)
- Student to teacher ratio: 22.84 (2023–24)
- Campuses: FLC/Main Campus
- Campus size: 77 acres (310,000 m^{2})
- Colors: Red, White, Black
- Slogan: It's Great to be a Fighting Indian
- Athletics conference: FHSAA Class 7A Region 3 District 11
- Mascot: Fighting Indians
- Rival: Sebastian River High School
- Website: vbhs.indianriverschools.org

Vero Beach High School (VBHS) is a grade 9–12 public high school in Vero Beach, Florida, United States established in 1925. The school is operated by the School District of Indian River County, and its design is similar to Keyport High School.

The campus of VBHS encompasses approximately 77 acres (310,000 m^{2}), which includes the Freshman Learning Center and main campus areas. The combination of school enrollment and the size of its campus makes VBHS the largest high school in Indian River County. The Freshman Learning Center serves about 820 9th grade students

Recently in the 2026-2027 school year, the Freshman Learning Center housing 9th grade has had a change of location and now moved to the main campus. The former Freshman Learning Center (now Vero Beach Middle School) houses grades 6-8, leaving it to be one of the few traditional middle schools in the county. The main campus (also known as VBHS houses grades 9-12.

== History ==
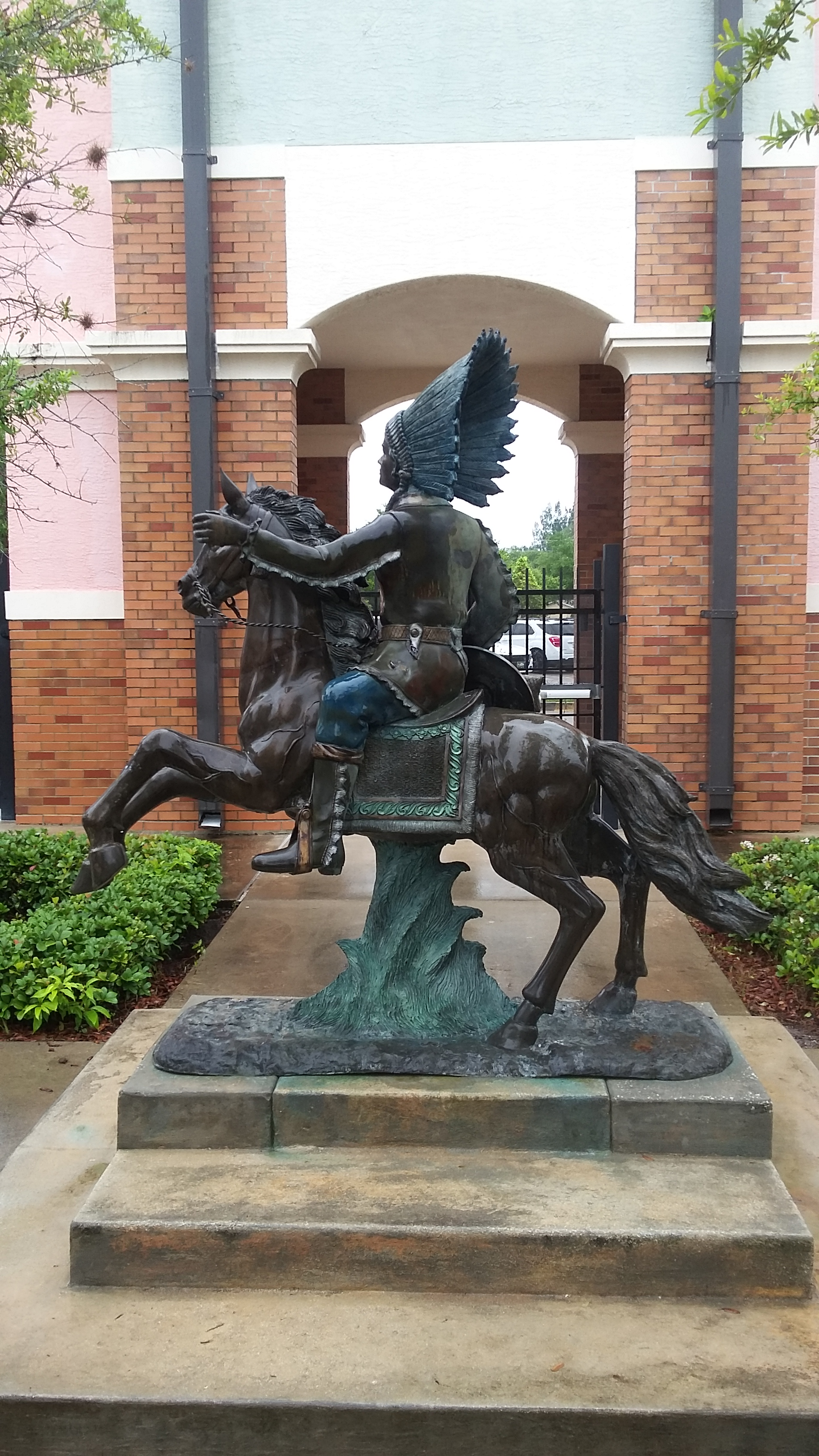
A statue of the Fighting Indians mascot.

Vero Beach High School can trace its timeline back to the class of 1905, where students learned in a one-room schoolhouse. In 1925, the first official Vero Beach High School opened. It was located about a half-mile north of the current location, where Vero Beach High School's Freshman Learning Center stands today.

After Vero Beach High School moved to its present-day location in 1963, the old high school became Vero Beach Junior High School, and VBHS took on a new official name, Vero Beach Senior High School.

In 1977, the junior high school was becoming insufficient for housing all of the county's junior high schoolers, and was torn down to make way for a new, smaller school, Indian River Middle 8 - the present-day home of the Freshman Learning Center, and soon to become a middle school again, once all the renovations at Vero Beach High School are complete. Prior to the completion of Sebastian River High School in 1994, Vero Beach High School was the only public high school in Indian River County.

Vero Beach High School completed a three-year, $51 million remodeling project in 2009.

Rachel Finnegan took over for the 2025–2026 school year.

== Academics ==
Vero Beach High School has an AP Program, a Dual enrollment program with Indian River State College, an Honors program, and regular level classes.

The Dual Enrollment Program is offered with Indian River State College to give students the opportunity to take college-level classes at the college, online, or during the summer. The school also offers career and technical classes.

== Athletics ==
On January 1, 2019, the Vero Beach High School Fighting Indians Band performed in the 2019 London New Year's Day Parade in London. This was the first time the band in its 90 years of existence had gone overseas to Europe and had traveled internationally. This had also brought some attention to the high school and the city of Vero Beach due to the number of viewers at the parade and on TV. On October 25, 2019, the Vero Beach High School Fighting Indians Football team in a 28–3 win over Fort Pierce Central set the state record for most consecutive regular-season wins with 61 straight. In October 2022, The football team was featured on NBC's Today show.

=== Lacrosse Championships ===
Spanning the period of 2006–2015, the VBHS Girls Lacrosse team won the statewide Lacrosse Championship every consecutive season. This nine year dynasty was unprecedented in the sport and extremely rare when compared across all Floridian high school teams in any sport. The city honored this dynasty by erecting two signs noting the achievement.

== Notable alumni ==
- G. Holmes Braddock, politician
- TJ Alford, college football player
- Jade Cargill, professional wrestler
- Alex Cobb, MLB player
- Dale Dawkins, NFL player
- Scotty Emerick, country music singer
- Barry Fanaro, Emmy Award-winning writer
- Mardy Fish, Olympic silver medal-winning tennis player
- Jahfari Harvey, NFL player
- Kenny Holmes, NFL player
- Vandrevius Jacobs, college football player
- Muni Long, Grammy-winning R&B artist
- YNW Melly, rapper
- Riley Minix, basketball player
- Alison Mosshart, singer and songwriter, bands The Kills and Dead Weather
- Zeke Motta, NFL player
- Jake Owen, Country singer
- Gary Parris, NFL player
- Albert Reed, model and Dancing With the Stars contestant
- Stephen Root, actor
- Jeannett Slesnick, philanthropist, community advocate, Coral Gables public official
- Eric Smith, NFL player
- Daleroy Stewart, NFL player
- James Stewart, NFL player
- Bryan Stork, NFL player
- Terry Taylor, professional wrestler
- John Terry, actor
