= Eric Smith (wide receiver) =

American football player (born 1971)

No. 83
- Positions: Wide receiver Return specialist

Personal information
- Born: September 15, 1971 (age 55); Vero Beach, Florida
- Listed height: 5 ft 11 in (1.80 m)
- Listed weight: 183 lb (83 kg)

Career information
- High school: Vero Beach
- College: Northwest Mississippi CC; LSU
- NFL draft: 1996: undrafted

Career history
- Kansas City Chiefs (1996–1997)*; Scottish Claymores (1997); Chicago Bears (1997)
- * Offseason or practice squad member only

Career NFL statistics
- Games played: 7
- Games started: 0
- Stats at Pro Football Reference

Eric Lamonte Smith (born September 15, 1971) is an American former professional football player who was a wide receiver and return specialist in the National Football League (NFL) for one season. He played college football at Northwest Mississippi Community College before transferring to the LSU Tigers.

== College career ==
Smith played two seasons at Northwest Mississippi Community College in Senatobia, Mississippi, after which he transferred to Louisiana State University. Smith sat out the 1993 season and played the next two seasons for the Tigers.

== Professional career ==
=== Scottish Claymores ===
Smith played with the Scottish Claymores of the World League of American Football (WLAF) in the spring of 1997. He caught 19 passes for 202 yards. Smith also returned seven punts for 94 yards and 21 kickoffs for 552 yards and one touchdown.

=== Chicago Bears ===
Smith signed with the Chicago Bears for the 1997 NFL season. He played in seven games for the Bears, primarily on special teams. Smith returned ten kicks for 196 yards, with the longest being for 28 yards. He also caught two passes for 22 yards.
