= Zeke Motta =

American football player (born 1990)

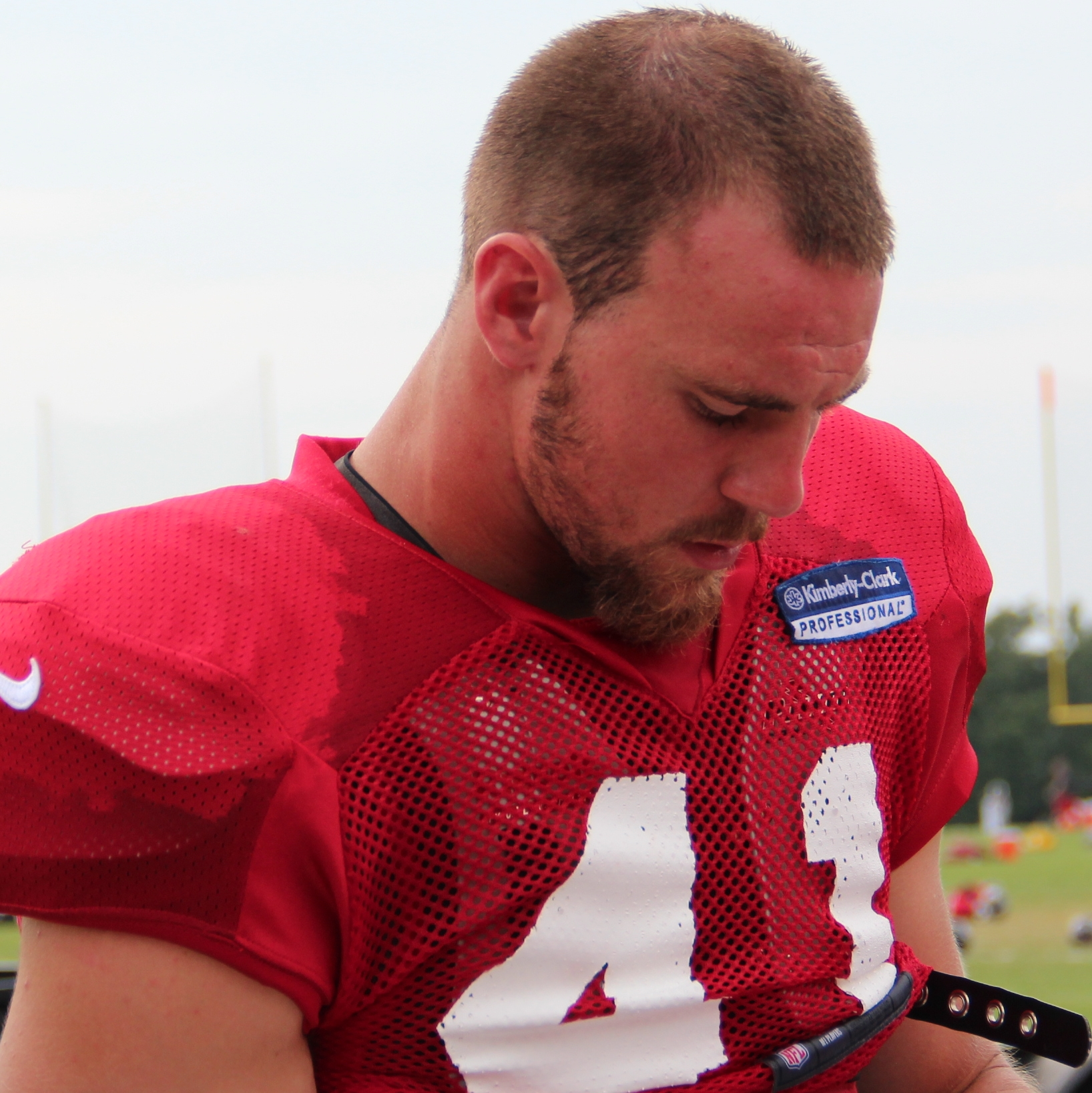
- Motta with the Atlanta Falcons in 2013

No. 41
- Position: Safety

Personal information
- Born: May 14, 1990 (age 36); Vero Beach, Florida, U.S.
- Listed height: 6 ft 2 in (1.88 m)
- Listed weight: 215 lb (98 kg)

Career information
- High school: Vero Beach (FL)
- College: Notre Dame
- NFL draft: 2013: 7th round, 244th overall pick

Career history
- Atlanta Falcons (2013–2014)

Career NFL statistics
- Total tackles: 16
- Pass deflections: 1
- Stats at Pro Football Reference

Ezekiel Ranieri Motta (born May 14, 1990) is an American former professional football player who was a safety for two seasons with the Atlanta Falcons of the National Football League (NFL). He was selected by the Falcons in the seventh round of the 2013 NFL draft. He played college football at Notre Dame.

== Early life ==
Motta attended Vero Beach High School in Vero Beach, Florida, where he was teammates with Bryan Stork. He tallied 137 tackles including eight tackles for a loss and three sacks during senior campaign at Vero Beach High School, and was named first-team Class 6A all-state as a senior. He played in the U.S. Army All-American Bowl in San Antonio, Texas in 2009. Considered a four-star recruit by Rivals.com, he was rated the No. 5 outside linebacker prospect in the nation. He accepted a scholarship offer from Notre Dame over offers from Auburn and Boston College.

== College career ==
In 2009, Motta was one of three freshmen to play in every game. He mostly contributed primarily on special teams and also moved back and forth between outside linebacker and safety, and recorded 12 tackles. As a sophomore, he played in all 13 games, in which he started 8. He totalled 50 tackles (30 solo, 20 assisted) which ranked seventh on the team. He added one and a half tackles for loss, one fumble recovery, one interception and two pass breakups. In his junior season, he played in all 13 games, starting eight at safety. He tallied 40 tackles, one interception, one pass breakup, one forced fumble and one fumble recovery. In his final season, he tallied 77 total tackles, including 16 in the 2013 BCS National Championship Game against the Alabama Crimson Tide. He also had two tackles for loss, three pass break ups, four pass deflections and a fumble recovery.

== Professional career ==
Pre-draft measurables
| Height | Weight | Arm length | Hand span | 40-yard dash | 20-yard shuttle | Three-cone drill | Vertical jump | Broad jump | Bench press |
|---|---|---|---|---|---|---|---|---|---|
| 6 ft 2 1/4 in (1.89 m) | 213 lb (97 kg) | 31 3/8 in (0.80 m) | 9 1/4 in (0.23 m) | 4.83 s | 4.16 s | 6.75 s | 35.5 in (0.90 m) | 10 ft 6 in (3.20 m) | 11 reps |
All values from NFL Combine

He was selected by the Atlanta Falcons in the seventh round (244th overall) of the 2013 NFL draft. He signed with the Falcons on May 17, 2013. On April 2, 2015, he was waived by the Falcons. In 2017, Motta filed a personal-injury lawsuit against Falcons doctors over inadequate treatment.
