= Gary Parris =

American football player (born 1950)

No. 80, 84, 89
- Position: Tight end

Personal information
- Born: June 13, 1950 (age 76); East St. Louis, Illinois, U.S.
- Listed height: 6 ft 2 in (1.88 m)
- Listed weight: 226 lb (103 kg)

Career information
- High school: Vero Beach (Vero Beach, Florida)
- College: Florida State
- NFL draft: 1973: 15th round, 372nd overall pick

Career history
- San Diego Chargers (1973–1974); Cleveland Browns (1975–1978); St. Louis Cardinals (1979–1980)

Career NFL statistics
- Receptions: 45
- Receiving yards: 512
- Receiving TDs: 5
- Stats at Pro Football Reference

Gary Thomas Parris (born June 13, 1950) is an American former professional football player who was a tight end in the National Football League (NFL). He played college football for the Florida State Seminoles. He played in the NFL for three teams from 1973 to 1980, including the San Diego Chargers, Cleveland Browns and St. Louis (Arizona) Cardinals.

== Early life ==
Parris was born June 13, 1950, in East St. Louis, Illinois. He later moved to Vero Beach, Florida. He attended Vero Beach High School, where he started playing football.

Parris graduated from Vero Beach High School, in 1969 and played at Florida State University.
