= Bryan Stork =

American football player (born 1990)

No. 66
- Position: Center

Personal information
- Born: November 15, 1990 (age 35); Vero Beach, Florida, U.S.
- Listed height: 6 ft 4 in (1.93 m)
- Listed weight: 315 lb (143 kg)

Career information
- High school: Vero Beach
- College: Florida State (2009–2013)
- NFL draft: 2014: 4th round, 105th overall pick

Career history

Playing
- New England Patriots (2014–2015)

Coaching
- Southern Miss (2017–2018) Graduate assistant; East Tennessee State (2019–2021) Tight ends coach

Awards and highlights
- Super Bowl champion (XLIX); BCS national champion (2013); Rimington Trophy (2013); Consensus All-American (2013); First-team All-ACC (2013); Second-team All-ACC (2012)

Career NFL statistics
- Games played: 21
- Games started: 17
- Fumble recoveries: 1
- Stats at Pro Football Reference

Bryan Stork (born November 15, 1990) is an American former professional football player who was a center in the National Football League (NFL). He played college football for the Florida State Seminoles, winning the Rimington Trophy in 2013. He was selected by the New England Patriots in the fourth round of the 2014 NFL draft.

In the span of 13 months, Stork was the starting center for Florida State's win in the 2014 BCS National Championship Game as a senior, and the starting center as a rookie for the Patriots when they won Super Bowl XLIX. His NFL career lasted only two years after a series of concussions and a failed trade.

== Early life ==
A native of Vero Beach, Florida, Stork attended Vero Beach High School, where he was teammates with Zeke Motta. Stork played tight end in high school, but was primarily a blocker in a run-based offense and registered 43 pancake blocks. In his senior year, Vero Beach finished 9–3 and lost in the second round of the playoffs to Royal Palm Beach.

Regarded as a three-star recruit by Rivals.com, Stork was listed as the No. 26 tight end prospect in his class. He chose the Seminoles over offers from Maryland, Syracuse, Central Florida, and Florida International.

== College career ==
After redshirting his initial year at Florida State University, Stork was converted into an interior offensive lineman. He began the 2010 season as a reserve, but then had to replace sophomore David Spurlock at right guard midway through the Boston College game, after Spurlock suffered a concussion. Stork made his first career start the following week at North Carolina State, but then missed the next two games with illness. Having lost his starting job, he returned to the field on the road at Maryland, replacing Henry Orelus at right guard in the second quarter. Stork started the last three games of the season and graded out at 77 percent in the 2010 ACC Championship Game against Virginia Tech. He followed that performance up by grading out at 80 percent with a 92 pass grade in the 2010 Chick-fil-A Bowl against South Carolina.

Stork won the Rimington Trophy in 2013 given to the nation's most outstanding center .

As a senior in 2013, Stork was a first-team All-Atlantic Coast Conference (ACC) selection.

Stork is a member of the Florida State chapter of Phi Delta Theta fraternity.

== Professional career ==
Pre-draft measurables
Height	Weight	Arm length	Hand span	40-yard dash	10-yard split	20-yard split	20-yard shuttle	Three-cone drill	Vertical jump	Broad jump	Bench press
6 ft 4 in (1.93 m)	315 lb (143 kg)	32 1/4 in (0.82 m)	10 1/8 in (0.26 m)	5.44 s	1.81 s	3.09 s	5.02 s	7.90 s	26 in (0.66 m)	08 ft 01 in (2.46 m)	21 reps
All values from NFL Combine

Stork was selected by the New England Patriots in the fourth round of the 2014 NFL draft.

Stork signed his rookie contract on May 19, 2014.

As a rookie, Stork started 11 regular season games for the Patriots, as well as two of the team's three playoff games; he missed the AFC Championship Game with an knee injury. On February 1, 2015, the Patriots won Super Bowl XLIX over the Seattle Seahawks. Stork became the fifth player ever to win a college national title and a Super Bowl in back to back years.

Stork was placed on short-term injured reserve to start the 2015 season due to a concussion and a neck injury. He was activated on November 7, 2015, and the next day played guard and right tackle against the Washington Redskins due to a spate of injuries on the Patriots' offensive line.

On August 24, 2016, Stork was traded to the Washington Redskins in exchange for a conditional 7th round pick in 2017. On August 29, before the trade was finalized, Stork failed his physical examination with the Redskins, which voided the trade. Stork was released by the Patriots later that day.

On March 21, 2017, Stork announced his retirement from the NFL after not playing in 2016 after suffering multiple concussions during his two seasons in the league.

== Coaching career ==
Stork was an offensive graduate assistant at Southern Miss Golden Eagles football for the 2017 and 2018 seasons. Since 2019, Stork has been the tight ends coach at East Tennessee State University (ETSU). After the 2021 SoCon Championship season concluded at ETSU, in early March 2022, Stork was hired as the Offensive line coach at University of the Cumberlands in Williamsburg, Kentucky.
