= Kenny Shaw =

American gridiron football player (born 1992)

No. 81
- Position: Wide receiver

Personal information
- Born: January 15, 1992 (age 34); Orlando, Florida, U.S.
- Listed height: 5 ft 11 in (1.80 m)
- Listed weight: 180 lb (82 kg)

Career information
- High school: Dr. Phillips (Orlando, Florida)
- College: Florida State
- NFL draft: 2014: undrafted

Career history
- Cleveland Browns (2014)*; Jacksonville Jaguars (2014)*; Oakland Raiders (2014)*; Toronto Argonauts (2015–2016); Ottawa Redblacks (2017); Saskatchewan Roughriders (2018); Edmonton Eskimos (2019)*; Edmonton Elks (2020)
- * Offseason or practice squad member only

Awards and highlights
- BCS national champion (2013)
- Stats at CFL.ca

Kenny Shaw (born January 15, 1992) is a former professional Canadian football wide receiver. He played college football for the Florida State Seminoles. He has also been a member of the Cleveland Browns, Jacksonville Jaguars, Oakland Raiders, Toronto Argonauts, Ottawa Redblacks, and Saskatchewan Roughriders.

== Early life ==
Shaw attended Dr. Phillips High School. Shaw was ranked a four-star prospect by Rivals in which he was 14th best wide receiver prospect in the country and 6th best overall prospect overall in the state of Florida. He was selected to the Florida Super 75 selected by the Times-Union. He was ranked 97th among Sporting News' Top 100 prospects.

College recruiting
Name	Hometown	School	Height	Weight	40^{‡}	Commit date
Kenny Shaw; Wide receiver	Orlando, Florida	Dr. Phillips High School	6 ft 0 in (1.83 m)	160 lb (73 kg)	4.5	Jan 2, 2010
Kenny Shaw; Wide receiver	Recruit ratings: Scout: Rivals:					
Overall recruit ranking: Scout: 132 (WR) Rivals: 116 National, 14 (WR), 20 (FL)
‡ Refers to 40-yard dash; Note: In many cases, Scout, Rivals, 247Sports, On3, and ESPN may conflict in their listings of height, weight and 40 time.; In these cases, the average was taken. ESPN grades are on a 100-point scale.; Sources: "Florida State Football Commitments". Rivals.; "2010 Florida State Football Recruiting Commits". Scout.; "Scout.com Team Recruiting Rankings". Scout.; "2010 Team Ranking". Rivals.com.

== College career ==
Shaw was a member of the Florida State Seminoles from 2010 to 2013. During his time at FSU, he won 3 ACC Atlantic division titles (2010, 2012 and 2013), 2 ACC conference championships (2012 and 2013) and 1 BCS National Championship (2013). In 2013, he was selected to the Coaches All-ACC Third-team in his senior season. He finished college with a total of 124 Receptions, 1,919 receiving yards and 14 receiving touchdowns.

== Professional career ==
=== Cleveland Browns ===
On May 12, 2014, Shaw signed with the Cleveland Browns as an undrafted free agent.

=== Jacksonville Jaguars ===
Shaw signed with the Jacksonville Jaguars on August 2, 2014. The Jaguars released Shaw on August 24, 2014.

=== Oakland Raiders ===
On December 10, 2014, Shaw was signed to the Oakland Raiders' practice squad.

=== Toronto Argonauts ===
On May 21, 2015, Shaw signed with the Toronto Argonauts of the Canadian Football League. He dressed in two games during the 2015 CFL season, making his regular season debut on August 14, 2015, against the Winnipeg Blue Bombers. In 2016, Shaw played in 17 games and registered his first 1000-yard season after catching 77 passes for 1004 yards and five touchdowns.

=== Ottawa Redblacks ===
On the first day of 2017 free agency, Shaw signed with the Ottawa Redblacks on February 14, 2017. Shaw struggled through numerous injuries in 2017, only managing to appear in three games catching six passes for 66 yards. Shaw was released by the Redblacks on April 3, 2018.

=== Saskatchewan Roughriders ===
On August 22, 2018, Shaw was added to the Saskatchewan Roughriders’ practice roster. He made three appearances for the Riders in 2018 catching 11 of 22 pass attempts for 153 yards. He was released by the club on January 2, 2019.

=== Edmonton Elks ===
Following his release by Saskatchewan, Shaw signed with the Edmonton Eskimos but was subsequently released after the team's opening camp. After not playing during the 2019 season, Shaw was re-signed by the Eskimos on January 29, 2020. Shaw did not play in 2020 due to the 2020 CFL season being cancelled and was released on January 9, 2021. He re-signed with the Elks on February 10, 2021.
