= 2016 Wake Forest Demon Deacons football team =

American college football season

2016 Wake Forest Demon Deacons football

Military Bowl champion

Military Bowl, W 34–26 vs. Temple
- Conference: Atlantic Coast Conference
- Atlantic Division
- Record: 7–6 (3–5 ACC)
- Head coach: Dave Clawson (3rd season)
- Offensive coordinator: Warren Ruggiero (3rd season)
- Offensive scheme: Multiple
- Defensive coordinator: Mike Elko (3rd season)
- Base defense: 4–2–5
- Captains: Marquel Lee; Wendell Dunn; Josh Harris; Tyler Hayworth; Cam Serigne
- Home stadium: BB&T Field

2016 Atlantic Coast Conference football standings
	Conf.			Overall
Team	W		L	W		L
Atlantic Division
No. 1 Clemson xy$#	7	–	1	14	–	1
No. 21 Louisville x	7	–	1	9	–	4
No. 8 Florida State	5	–	3	10	–	3
NC State	3	–	5	7	–	6
Wake Forest	3	–	5	7	–	6
Boston College	2	–	6	7	–	6
Syracuse	2	–	6	4	–	8
Coastal Division
No. 16 Virginia Tech xy	6	–	2	10	–	4
North Carolina	5	–	3	8	–	5
No. 20 Miami (FL)	5	–	3	9	–	4
Pittsburgh	5	–	3	8	–	5
Georgia Tech	4	–	4	9	–	4
Duke	1	–	7	4	–	8
Virginia	1	–	7	2	–	10
Championship: Clemson 42, Virginia Tech 35
# – College Football Playoff champion; $ – Conference champion; x – Division champion/co-champions; y – Championship game participant; Rankings from AP Poll

The 2016 Wake Forest Demon Deacons football team represented Wake Forest University during the 2016 NCAA Division I FBS football season. The team was coached by Dave Clawson, who was in his third season at the school, and played its home games at BB&T Field. Wake Forest competed in the Atlantic Division of the Atlantic Coast Conference, as they have since the league's inception in 1953. They finished the season 7–6, 3–5 in ACC play to finish in a tie for fourth place in the Atlantic Division. They were invited to the Military Bowl where they defeated Temple.

When Wake Forest lost to Louisville on November 12, Dave Clawson alleged that Louisville had received impermissible information that benefited the Cardinals on the football field. On December 14, 2016, after a month long probe, former Wake Forest staff member and IMG College radio analyst Tommy Elrod was dismissed from the program for leaking confidential and proprietary game preparations on multiple occasions. Once the leaks came to light, Clawson and offensive coordinator Warren Ruggiero would completely overhaul the Demon Deacons' offensive playbook in the offseason resulting in the "slow mesh" offense, an offensive scheme based on the run-pass option (RPO).

== Recruiting ==
College recruiting information (2016)
Name	Hometown	School	Height	Weight	40^{‡}	Commit date
Carlos Basham Jr. DE	Roanoke, VA	Northside HS	6 ft 3 in (1.91 m)	225 lb (102 kg)	4.77	Jul 6, 2015
Carlos Basham Jr. DE	Recruit ratings: Scout: Rivals: 247Sports: ESPN:					
Essang Bassey; CB	Columbus, GA	Columbus HS	5 ft 9 in (1.75 m)	174 lb (79 kg)	N/A	Jun 22, 2015
Essang Bassey; CB	Recruit ratings: Scout: Rivals: 247Sports: ESPN:					
Jeremiah Brown; WR	Savannah, GA	Southwest Guilford HS	6 ft 2 in (1.88 m)	173 lb (78 kg)	4.50	Apr 21, 2015
Jeremiah Brown; WR	Recruit ratings: Scout: Rivals: 247Sports: ESPN:					
Arkeem Byrd; RB	Savannah, GA	Jenkins HS	6 ft 0 in (1.83 m)	190 lb (86 kg)	N/A	Feb 3, 2016
Arkeem Byrd; RB	Recruit ratings: Scout: Rivals: 247Sports: ESPN:					
Cade Carney; TE	Davidson, NC	Davidson Day School	5 ft 11 in (1.80 m)	213 lb (97 kg)	4.53	Jun 19, 2015
Cade Carney; TE	Recruit ratings: Scout: Rivals: 247Sports: ESPN:					
Brandon Chapman; TE	Grove City, OH	Grove City HS	6 ft 6 in (1.98 m)	251 lb (114 kg)	5.02	May 20, 2015
Brandon Chapman; TE	Recruit ratings: Scout: Rivals: 247Sports: ESPN:					
Thomas Cole; TE	Wellsburg, WV	Brooke HS	6 ft 4 in (1.93 m)	225 lb (102 kg)	N/A	Jan 5, 2016
Thomas Cole; TE	Recruit ratings: Scout: Rivals: 247Sports: ESPN:					
DeAndre' Delaney; RB	Morristown, TN	Morristown–Hamblen West HS	6 ft 1 in (1.85 m)	200 lb (91 kg)	N/A	Dec 7, 2015
DeAndre' Delaney; RB	Recruit ratings: Scout: Rivals: 247Sports: ESPN:					
Greg Dortch; WR	Highland Springs, VA	Highland Springs HS	5 ft 8 in (1.73 m)	150 lb (68 kg)	4.60	Aug 6, 2015
Greg Dortch; WR	Recruit ratings: Scout: Rivals: 247Sports: ESPN:					
Malik Grate; WR	Pendleton, SC	Pendleton HS	6 ft 0 in (1.83 m)	160 lb (73 kg)	4.50	Apr 29, 2015
Malik Grate; WR	Recruit ratings: Scout: Rivals: 247Sports: ESPN:					
Sulaiman Kamara; DT	Richmond, VA	Hermitage HS	6 ft 2 in (1.88 m)	287 lb (130 kg)	5.60	Nov 1, 2015
Sulaiman Kamara; DT	Recruit ratings: Scout: Rivals: 247Sports: ESPN:					
LaRonde Liverpool; OLB	Virginia Beach, VA	Landstown HS	6 ft 3 in (1.91 m)	226 lb (103 kg)	4.74	Jun 2, 2015
LaRonde Liverpool; OLB	Recruit ratings: Scout: Rivals: 247Sports: ESPN:					
Dominic Maggio; K	Baltimore, MD	Boys Latin HS	6 ft 1 in (1.85 m)	155 lb (70 kg)	N/A	Jul 15, 2014
Dominic Maggio; K	Recruit ratings: Scout: Rivals: 247Sports: ESPN:					
Luke Masterson; S	Naples, FL	Marlboro County HS	6 ft 1 in (1.85 m)	190 lb (86 kg)	4.50	Jul 27, 2015
Luke Masterson; S	Recruit ratings: Scout: Rivals: 247Sports: ESPN:					
Je'vionte Nash; OG	Orange Park, FL	Oakleaf HS	6 ft 2 in (1.88 m)	291 lb (132 kg)	5.31	Apr 2, 2015
Je'vionte Nash; OG	Recruit ratings: Scout: Rivals: 247Sports: ESPN:					
Jamie Newman; QB	Graham, NC	Graham HS	6 ft 4 in (1.93 m)	237 lb (108 kg)	4.76	Apr 20, 2015
Jamie Newman; QB	Recruit ratings: Scout: Rivals: 247Sports: ESPN:					
Traveon Redd; S	Ridgeway, VA	Magna Vista HS	5 ft 11 in (1.80 m)	182 lb (83 kg)	4.64	Jul 31, 2015
Traveon Redd; S	Recruit ratings: Scout: Rivals: 247Sports: ESPN:					
Taleni Suhren; OT	Charlotte, NC	Ardrey Kell HS	6 ft 4 in (1.93 m)	281 lb (127 kg)	5.52	Apr 15, 2015
Taleni Suhren; OT	Recruit ratings: Scout: Rivals: 247Sports: ESPN:					
Emmanuel Walker; DE	Santee, SC	Lake Marion HS	6 ft 3 in (1.91 m)	220 lb (100 kg)	4.63	Aug 28, 2015
Emmanuel Walker; DE	Recruit ratings: Scout: Rivals: 247Sports: ESPN:					
Tyler Watson; OT	Alpharetta, GA	Milton HS	6 ft 5 in (1.96 m)	244 lb (111 kg)	N/A	Sep 9, 2015
Tyler Watson; OT	Recruit ratings: Scout: Rivals: 247Sports: ESPN:					
Jacquez Williams; WR	Hinesville, GA	Liberty County HS	6 ft 2 in (1.88 m)	200 lb (91 kg)	4.53	Jun 24, 2015
Jacquez Williams; WR	Recruit ratings: Scout: Rivals: 247Sports: ESPN:					
Zander Zimmer; DE	Orlando, FL	Bishop Moore HS	6 ft 3 in (1.91 m)	225 lb (102 kg)	4.91	Jun 9, 2015
Zander Zimmer; DE	Recruit ratings: Scout: Rivals: 247Sports: ESPN:					
Overall recruit ranking: Scout: 64 Rivals: 63 247Sports: 59 ESPN: 50
‡ Refers to 40-yard dash; Note: In many cases, Scout, Rivals, 247Sports, On3, and ESPN may conflict in their listings of height, weight and 40 time.; In these cases, the average was taken. ESPN grades are on a 100-point scale.; Sources: "Wake Forest 2016 Football Commitments". Rivals.; "2016 Wake Forest Commits". Scout.; "2016 Player Commitments – Wake Forest". ESPN.; "Scout.com Team Recruiting Rankings". Scout.; "2016 Team Ranking". Rivals.com.

== Schedule ==
Date	Time	Opponent	Site	TV	Result	Attendance
September 1	7:00 p.m.	Tulane*	BB&T Field; Winston-Salem, NC	ACCN+	W 7–3	24,398
September 10	3:30 p.m.	at Duke	Wallace Wade Stadium; Durham, NC (rivalry)	ESPNU	W 24–14	21,077
September 17	6:30 p.m.	Delaware*	BB&T Field; Winston-Salem, NC	ACCN+	W 38–21	25,972
September 24	3:30 p.m.	at Indiana*	Memorial Stadium; Bloomington, IN	BTN	W 33–28	45,519
October 1	3:30 p.m.	at NC State	Carter–Finley Stadium; Raleigh, NC (rivalry)	ACCRSN	L 16–33	58,200
October 8	7:00 p.m.	Syracuse	BB&T Field; Winston-Salem, NC	ACCRSN	W 28–9	25,162
October 15	3:30 p.m.	at No. 14 Florida State	Doak Campbell Stadium; Tallahassee, FL	ESPN	L 6–17	77,102
October 29	3:30 p.m.	Army*^{†}	BB&T Field; Winston-Salem, NC	ACCRSN	L 13–21	27,938
November 5	3:00 p.m.	Virginia	BB&T Field; Winston-Salem, NC	ACCRSN	W 27–20	25,334
November 12	7:00 p.m.	at No. 5 Louisville	Papa John's Cardinal Stadium; Louisville, KY	ESPN2	L 12–44	51,218
November 19	7:00 p.m.	No. 5 Clemson	BB&T Field; Winston-Salem, NC	ESPN	L 13–35	31,152
November 26	3:00 p.m.	Boston College	BB&T Field; Winston-Salem, NC	ACCRSN	L 14–17	24,866
December 27	3:30 p.m.	vs. No. 24 Temple*	Navy–Marine Corps Memorial Stadium; Annapolis, MD (Military Bowl)	ESPN	W 34–26	26,656
*Non-conference game; ^{†}Homecoming; Rankings from AP Poll released prior to the game; All times are in Eastern time

== Coaching staff ==
Position	Name	First year at WFU
Head coach	Dave Clawson	2014
Defensive coordinator / Safeties	Mike Elko	2014
Asst head coach / Receivers	Kevin Higgins	2014
Offensive coordinator / quarterbacks	Warren Ruggiero	2014
Special teams coordinator / tight ends	Adam Scheier	2014
Defensive Line	Dave Cohen	2014
Running backs	John Hunter	2014
Cornerbacks	Derrick Jackson	2012
Offensive Line	Nick Tabacca	2014

== Game summaries ==
=== Tulane ===
3rd meeting. 0–2 all time. Last meeting 1995, 35–9 Green Wave in New Orleans.

Week One: Tulane Green Wave at Wake Forest Demon Deacons – Game summary

Quarter	1	2	3	4	Total
Green Wave	3	0	0	0	3
Demon Deacons	0	7	0	0	7

at BB&T Field, Winston–Salem, NC

- Date: September 1
- Game time: 7:00 p.m. EST
- Game weather: 72° F • N 2 • Cloudy, some rain
- Game attendance: 24,398
- Referee: David Epperley
- TV announcers (ESPN3): Play-by-Play: Taylor Zauzour • Color Analyst: Al Groh
- Final Stats

Game information

First quarter

- 10:22 TUL – Andrew DiRocco 41-yard field goal, Green Wave 3–0. Drive: 8 plays, 51 yards, TOP 4:38

Second quarter

- 14:16 WFU – Kendall Hinton 1-yard run (Mike Weaver kick), Demon Deacons 7–3. Drive: 12 plays, 53 yards, TOP 4:12

Third quarter

- No Scoring

Fourth quarter

- No Scoring

Leading Passers

- TUL–Glen Cuiellette, 12/23, 134 yards
- WF–John Wolford, 9/17, 79 yards

Leading Rushers

- TUL–Glen Cuiellette, 22 carries, 54 yards
- WF–Kendall Hinton, 8 carries, 24 yards, 1 touchdown

Leading Receivers

- TUL–Josh Rounds, 1 reception, 46 yards
- WF–Matt Colburn, 2 receptions, 29 yards

Leading Tacklers

- TUL–Jarrod Franklin, 7 tackles
- WF–Jessie Bates, 8 tackles

=== @ Duke ===
97th meeting. 37–57–2 all time. Last meeting 2015, 27–21 Blue Devils in Winston–Salem.

Week Two: Wake Forest Demon Deacons at Duke Blue Devils – Game summary

Quarter	1	2	3	4	Total
Demon Deacons	0	7	14	3	24
Blue Devils	7	0	7	0	14

at Wallace Wade Stadium, Durham, NC

- Date: September 10
- Game time: 3:30 p.m. EST
- Game weather: 91° F • S 7 • Mostly cloudy
- Game attendance: 21,077
- Referee: Duane Heydt
- TV announcers (ESPNU): Play-by-Play: Eamon McAnaney • Color Analyst: John Congemi
- Final Stats

Game information

First quarter

- 7:07 DUKE – Daniel Jones 1-yard run (AJ Reed kick), Blue Devils 7–0. Drive: 17 plays, 60 yards, TOP 6:33

Second quarter

- 6:58 WFU – Cade Carney 7-yard run (Mike Weaver kick), Tied 7–7. Drive: 6 plays, 85 yards, TOP 2:51

Third quarter

- 12:04 WFU – Cade Carney 1-yard run (Mike Weaver kick), Demon Deacons 14–7. Drive: 6 plays, 14 yards, TOP 2:24
- 10:12 DUKE – Daniel Jones 2-yard run (AJ Reed kick), Tied 14–14. Drive: 6 plays, 75 yards, TOP 1:52
- 4:02 WFU – Cade Carney 55-yard run (Mike Weaver kick), Demon Deacons 21–14. Drive: 3 plays, 64 yards, TOP 1:11

Fourth quarter

- 3:50 WFU – Mike Weaver 34-yard field goal, Demon Deacons 24–14. Drive: 7 plays, 70 yards, TOP 4:07

Leading Passers

- WF–Kendall Hinton, 6/11, 133 yards, 1 interception
- DUKE–Daniel Jones, 31/48, 332 yards, 1 interception

Leading Rushers

- WF–Cade Carney, 17 carries, 108 yards, 3 touchdowns
- DUKE–Jela Duncan, 9 carries, 25 yards

Leading Receivers

- WF–Alex Bachman, 1 reception, 62 yards
- DUKE–Anthony Nash, 8 receptions, 112 yards

Leading Tacklers

- WF–Marquel Lee, 10 tackles
- DUKE–Joe Gilles–Harris, 15 tackles

=== Delaware ===
2nd meeting. 1–0 all time. Last meeting 1932, 7–0 Demon Deacons in Newark.

Week Three: Delaware Fightin' Blue Hens at Wake Forest Demon Deacons – Game summary

Quarter	1	2	3	4	Total
Fightin' Blue Hens	7	7	0	7	21
Demon Deacons	10	14	14	0	38

at BB&T Field, Winston-Salem, NC

- Date: September 17
- Game time: 6:30 p.m. EST
- Game weather: 82° F • N 1 • Clear
- Game attendance: 25,972
- Referee: Jerry Magallanes
- TV announcers (ESPN3): Play-by-Play: Dave Weekley • Color Analyst: Tom O'Brien
- Final Stats

Game information

First quarter

- 10:44 WFU – Kendall Hinton 10-yard run (Mike Weaver kick), Demon Deacons 7–0. Drive: 6 plays, 53 yards, TOP 2:45
- 2:48 WFU – Mike Weaver 42-yard field goal, Demon Deacons 10–0. Drive 8 plays, 43 yards, TOP 2:55
- 0:02 DEL – Diante Cherry 6-yard pass from Blake Rankin (Frank Raggo kick), Demon Deacons 10–7. Drive: 2 plays, 10 yards, TOP 0:51

Second quarter

- 11:58 WFU – Tyler Bell 15-yard run (Mike Weaver kick), Demon Deacons 17–7. Drive: 8 plays, 71 yards, TOP 3:04
- 6:17 DEL – Thomas Jefferson 10-yard run (Frank Raggo kick), Demon Deacons 17–14. Drive: 4 plays, 19 yards, TOP 1:27
- 0:44 WFU – Matt Colburn 1-yard run (Mike Weaver kick), Demon Deacons 24–14. Drive: 14 plays, 75 yards, TOP 5:33

Third quarter

- 11:05 WFU – Alex Bachman 4-yard pass from John Wolford (Mike Weaver kick), Demon Deacons 31–14. Drive: 10 plays, 75 yards, TOP 3:55
- 4:45 WFU – John Wolford 7-yard run (Mike Weaver kick), Demon Deacons 38–14. Drive: 8 plays, 70 yards, TOP 4:06

Fourth quarter

- 8:03 DEL – Jalen Randolph 0-yard fumble recovery (Frank Raggo kick), Demon Deacons 38–21. Drive: 11 plays, 80 yards, TOP 3:53

Leading Passers

- DEL–Blake Rankin, 6/20, 38 yards, 1 touchdown
- WF–John Wolford, 13/24, 155 yards, 1 touchdown, 1 interception

Leading Rushers

- DEL–Jalen Randolph, 7 carries, 36 yards, 1 touchdown
- WF–Matt Colburn, 24 carries, 118 yards, 1 touchdown

Leading Receivers

- DEL–Diante Cherry, 3 receptions, 22 yards, 1 touchdown
- WF–Tabari Hines, 3 receptions, 40 yards

Leading Tacklers

- DEL– John Nassib, 7 tackles
- WF– Marquel Lee, 5 tackles

=== @ Indiana ===
2nd meeting. 0–1 all time. Last meeting 2015, 31–24 Hoosiers in Winston–Salem.

Week Four: Wake Forest Demon Deacons at Indiana Hoosiers – Game summary

Quarter	1	2	3	4	Total
Demon Deacons	7	14	6	6	33
Hoosiers	7	0	14	7	28

at Memorial Stadium, Bloomington, IN

- Date: September 24
- Game time: 3:30 p.m. EST
- Game weather: 85° F • N–NE 5 • Fair
- Game attendance: 45,519
- Referee: Don Willard
- TV announcers (BTN): Play-by-Play: Joe Beninati • Color Analyst: J Leman
- Final Stats

Game information

First Quarter

- 14:47 IU – Nick Westbrook-Ikhine 75 yard pass from Richard Lagow (Griffin Oakes kick), Hoosiers 7–0. Drive: 1 play, 75 yards, TOP 0:13
- 2:56 WFU – John Wolford 4 yard run (Mike Weaver kick), Tied 7–7. Drive: 12 plays, 61 yards, TOP 4:42

Second Quarter

- 9:35 WFU – Jessie Bates 55 yard interception return (Mike Weaver kick), Demon Deacons 14–7. Drive: 5 plays, 16 yards, TOP 1:50
- 0:58 WFU – Chuck Wade 26 yard pass from John Wolford (Mike Weaver kick), Demon Deacons 21–7. Drive: 6 plays, 80 yards, TOP 1:58

Third Quarter

- 11:12 WFU – Mike Weaver 46 yard field goal, Demon Deacons 24–7. Drive: 5 plays, 15 yards, TOP 1:37
- 10:39 IU – Nick Westbrook-Ikhine 10 yard pass from Richard Lagow (Griffin Oakes kick), Demon Deacons 24–14. Drive: 2 plays, 75 yards, TOP 0:33
- 2:22 WFU – Mike Weaver 30 yard field goal, Demon Deacons 27–14. Drive: 8 plays, 54 yards, TOP 3:24
- 0:39 IU – Tyler Natee 1 yard run (Griffin Oakes kick), Demon Deacons 27–21. Drive: 4 plays, 65 yards, TOP 1:43

Fourth Quarter

- 13:46 WFU – John Wolford 11 yard run (two-point pass conversion failed), Demon Deacons 33–21. Drive: 12 plays, 75 yards, TOP 5:40
- 0:11 IU – Donavan Hale 49 yard pass from Richard Lagow (Griffin Oakes kick), Demon Deacons 33–28. Drive: 4 plays, 73 yards, TOP 0:35

Leading Passers

- IU–Richard Lagow, 28/47, 496 yards, 3 touchdowns, 5 interceptions
- WF–John Wolford, 16/29, 172 yards, 1 touchdown

Leading Rushers

- IU–Devine Redding, 16 carries, 69 yards
- WF–Matt Colburn, 29 carries, 103 yards

Leading Receivers

- IU–Nick Westbrook-Ikhine, 6 receptions, 129 yards, 2 touchdowns
- WF–Chuck Wade, 6 receptions, 59 yards , 1 touchdowns

Leading Tacklers

- IU–Tegray Scales, 13 tackles
- WF–Jessie Bates, 8 tackles

=== @ NC State ===
110th meeting. 38–65–6 all time. Last meeting 2015, 35–17 Wolfpack in Winston–Salem.

Week Five: Wake Forest Demon Deacons at NC State Wolfpack – Game summary

Quarter	1	2	3	4	Total
Demon Deacons	0	9	7	0	16
Wolfpack	17	6	3	7	33

at Carter–Finley Stadium, Raleigh, NC

- Date: October 1
- Game time: 3:30 p.m. EST
- Game weather: 83° F • SSW 9 • Mostly cloudy
- Game attendance: 58,200
- Referee: Duane Heydt
- TV announcers (ACCRSN): Play-by-Play: Wes Durham • Color Analyst: James Bates • Sideline: Lyndsay Rowley
- Final Stats

Game information

First quarter

- 11:32 NCST – Matthew Dayes 6-yard run (Kyle Bambard kick), Wolfpack 7–0. Drive: 8 plays, 75 yards, TOP 3:28
- 7:54 NCST – Kyle Bambard 20-yard field goal, Wolfpack 10–0. Drive: 8 plays, 51 yards, TOP 2:44
- 1:23 NCST – Jaylen Samuels 13-yard pass from Ryan Finley (Kyle Bambard kick), Wolfpack 17–0. Drive: 11 plays, 88 yards, TOP 4:24

Second quarter

- 13:45 WFU – Mike Weaver 34-yard field goal, Wolfpack 17–3. Drive: 7 plays, 61 yards, TOP 2:32
- 10:12 NCST – Kelvin Harmon 36-yard pass from Ryan Finley (Kyle Bambard kick failed), Wolfpack 23–3. Drive: 8 plays, 75 yards, TOP 3:33
- 6:12 WFU – Mike Weaver 29-yard field goal, Wolfpack 23–6. Drive: 10 plays, 70 yards, TOP 3:51
- 3:03 WFU – Mike Weaver 41-yard field goal, Wolfpack 23–9. Drive: 6 plays, 41 yards, 1:38

Third quarter

- 9:41 NCST – Kyle Bambard 48-yard field goal, Wolfpack 26–9. Drive: 8 plays, 49 yards, 2:16
- 2:25 WFU – Tabari Hines 9-yard pass from John Wolford (Mike Weaver kick), Wolfpack 26–16. Drive: 7 plays, 69 yards, 3:10

Fourth quarter

- 5:53 NCST – Kelvin Harmon 7-yard pass from Ryan Finley (Kyle Bambard kick), Wolfpack 33–16. Drive: 9 plays, 66 yards, 4:51

Leading Passers

- WF–John Wolford, 25/41, 263 yards, 1 touchdown
- NCST–Ryan Finley, 23/36, 300 yards, 3 touchdowns

Leading Rushers

- WF–Matt Colburn, 10 carries, 39 yards
- NCST–Matthew Dayes, 24 carries, 125 yards, 1 touchdown

Leading Receivers

- WF–Tabari Hines, 9 receptions, 125 yards, 1 touchdown
- NCST–Stephen Louis, 4 receptions, 102 yards

Leading Tacklers

- WF–Jessie Bates, 15 tackles
- NCST–Josh Jones, 12 tackles

=== Syracuse ===
6th meeting. 1–4 all time. Last meeting 2015, 30–17 Orange in Syracuse.

Week Six: Syracuse Orange at Wake Forest Demon Deacons – Game summary

Quarter	1	2	3	4	Total
Orange	2	7	0	0	9
Demon Deacons	0	14	0	14	28

at BB&T Field, Winston-Salem, NC

- Date: October 8
- Game time: 7:00 p.m. EST
- Game weather: 63° F • NW 13 • Rain (Hurr. Matthew)
- Game attendance: 25,162
- Referee: Riley Johnson
- TV announcers (ACCRSN): Play-by-Play: Bob Rathburn • Color Analyst: Takeo Spikes • Sideline: Kelsey Wingert
- Final Stats

Game information

First quarter

- 11:38 SU – Team Safety, Orange 2–0. Drive: 4 plays, -39 yards, TOP 1:42

Second quarter

- 11:07 WFU – John Wolford 7-yard run (Mike Weaver kick), Demon Deacons 7–2. Drive: 9 plays, 79 yards, TOP 4:07
- 4:46 SU – Dontae Strickland 1-yard run (Cole Murphy kick), Orange 9–7. Drive: 10 plays, 59 yards, TOP 3:22
- 1:43 WFU – John Wolford 37-yard run (Mike Weaver kick), Demon Deacons 14–9. Drive: 7 plays, 75 yards, TOP 3:03

Third quarter

- No Scoring

Fourth quarter

- 3:59 WFU – Cade Carney 3-yard run (Mike Weaver kick), Demon Deacons 21–9. Drive: 6 plays, 78 yards, TOP 2:54
- 1:30 WFU – Cam Glenn 83-yard fumble return (Mike Weaver kick), Demon Deacons 28–9. Drive: 8 plays, 53 yards, TOP 2:29

Leading Passers

- SYR–Eric Dungey, 16/25, 156 yards, 1 interception
- WF–John Wolford, 13/22, 140 yards, 1 interception

Leading Rushers

- SYR–Dontae Strickland, 13 carries, 74 yards, 1 touchdown
- WF–Cade Carney, 29 carries, 104 yards, 1 touchdown

Leading Receivers

- SYR–Steve Ishmael, 5 receptions, 56 yards
- WF–Cam Serigne, 4 receptions, 68 yards

Leading Tacklers

- SYR–Paris Bennett, 12 tackles
- WF–Marquel Lee, 15 tackles

=== @ Florida State ===
35th meeting. 6–27–1 all time. Last meeting 2015, 24–16 Seminoles in Winston–Salem.

Week Seven: Wake Forest Demon Deacons at Florida State Seminoles – Game summary

Quarter	1	2	3	4	Total
Demon Deacons	0	3	3	0	6
#14 Seminoles	3	7	7	0	17

at Doak Campbell Stadium, Tallahassee, FL

- Date: October 15
- Game time: 3:30 p.m. EST
- Game weather: 83° F • E 8 • Partly cloudy
- Game attendance: 77,102
- Referee: Stuart Mullins
- TV announcers (ESPN): Play-by-Play: Bob Wischusen • Color Analyst: Brock Huard • Sideline: Allison Williams
- Final Stats

Game information

First quarter

- 0:00 FSU – Ricky Aguayo 29-yard field goal, Seminoles 3–0. Drive: 8 plays, 24 yards, TOP 3:01

Second quarter

- 11:05 WFU – Mike Weaver 34-yard field goal, Tied 3–3. Drive: 8 plays, 56 yards, TOP 3:17
- 3:16 FSU – Deondre Francois 2-yard run (Ricky Aguayo kick), Seminoles 10–3. Drive: 5 plays, 26 yards, TOP 2:28

Third quarter

- 11:58 WFU – Mike Weaver 29-yard field goal, Seminoles 10–6. Drive: 7 plays, 18 yards, TOP 2:19
- 7:32 FSU – Auden Tate 11-yard pass from Deondre Francois (Ricky Aguayo kick), Seminoles 17–6. Drive: 6 plays, 96 yards, TOP 2:38

Fourth quarter

- No Scoring

Leading Passers

- WF–John Wolford, 16/34, 184 yards, 2 interceptions
- FSU–Deondre Francois, 22/37, 319 yards, 1 touchdown, 1 interception

Leading Rushers

- WF–Cade Carney, 10 carries, 33 yards
- FSU–Dalvin Cook, 25 carries, 115 yards

Leading Receivers

- WF–Cortez Lewis, 6 receptions, 109 yards
- FSU–Travis Rudolph, 13 receptions, 238 yards

Leading Tacklers

- WF–Marquel Lee, 9 tackles
- FSU–Trey Marshall, 8 tackles

=== Army ===
16th meeting. 11–4 all time. Last meeting 2015, 17–14 Demon Deacons in West Point.

Week Nine: Army Black Knights at Wake Forest Demon Deacons – Game summary

Quarter	1	2	3	4	Total
Black Knights	7	0	0	14	21
Demon Deacons	0	7	3	3	13

at BB&T Field, Winston-Salem, NC

- Date: October 29
- Game time: 3:00 p.m. EST
- Game weather: 76° F • SW 4 • Clear
- Game attendance: 27,948
- Referee: David Epperley
- TV announcers (ACCRSN): Play-by-Play: James Bates • Color Analyst: Takeo Spikes • Sideline: Kelsey Wingert
- Final Stats

Game information

First quarter

- 7:54 ARMY – Edgar Poe 43-yard pass from Ahmad Bradshaw (Blake Wilson kick), Black Knights 7–0. Drive: 1 play, 43 yards, TOP 0:08

Second quarter

- 7:43 WFU – Tabari Hines 3-yard pass from John Wolford (Mike Weaver kick), Tied 7–7. Drive: 9 plays, 69 yards, TOP 3:06

Third quarter

- 12:02 WFU – Mike Weaver 37-yard field goal, Demon Deacons 10–7. Drive: 7 plays, 16 yards, TOP 1:51

Fourth quarter

- 11:45 ARMY – Ahmad Bradshaw 11-yard run (Blake Wilson kick), Black Knights 14–10. Drive: 9 plays, 88 yards, TOP 4:00
- 2:54 ARMY – Darnell Woolfolk 6-yard run (Blake Wilson kick), Black Knights 21–10. Drive: 12 plays, 60 yards, TOP 6:31
- 1:25 WFU – Mike Weaver 34-yard field goal, Black Knights 21–13. Drive: 10 plays, 49 yards, TOP 1:29

Leading Passers

- ARMY–Ahmad Bradshaw, 6/8, 145 yards, 1 touchdown, 1 interception
- WF–John Wolford, 23/43, 220 yards, 1 touchdown, 3 interceptions

Leading Rushers

- ARMY–Ahmad Bradshaw, 27 carries, 65 yards, 1 touchdown
- WF–John Wolford, 10 carries, 66 yards

Leading Receivers

- ARMY–Edgar Poe, 4 receptions, 122 yards, 1 touchdown
- WF–Tabari Hines, 7 receptions, 79 yards, 1 touchdown

Leading Tacklers

- ARMY–Jeremy Timpf, 9 tackles
- WF–Marquel Lee, 12 tackles

=== Virginia ===
49th meeting. 14–34 all time. Last meeting 2012, 16–10 Demon Deacons in Charlottesville.

Week Ten: Virginia Cavaliers at Wake Forest Demon Deacons – Game summary

Quarter	1	2	3	4	Total
Cavaliers	6	0	14	0	20
Demon Deacons	7	10	0	10	27

at BB&T Field, Winston-Salem, NC

- Date: November 5
- Game time: 3:00 p.m. EST
- Game weather: 63° F • WNW 4 • Sunny
- Game attendance: 25,334
- Referee: Riley Johnson
- TV announcers (ACCRSN): Play-by-Play: Wes Durham • Color Analyst: James Bates • Sideline: Niki Noto
- Final Stats

Game information

First quarter

- 11:31 UVA – Jordan Ellis 6-yard run (two-point pass conversion failed), Cavaliers 6–0. Drive: 10 plays, 75 yards, TOP 3:29
- 3:38 WFU – John Wolford 64-yard run (Mike Weaver kick), Demon Deacons 7–6. Drive: 6 plays, 80 yards, TOP 3:11

Second quarter

- 10:41 WFU – Mike Weaver 46-yard field goal, Demon Deacons 10–6. Drive: 11 plays, 56 yards, TOP 5:24
- 0:23 WFU – Cam Serigne 3-yard pass from John Wolford (Mike Weaver kick), Demon Deacons 17–6. Drive: 7 plays, 52 yards, TOP 1:33

Third quarter

- 9:43 UVA – Doni Dowling 2-yard pass from Kurt Benkert (Sam Hayward kick), Demon Deacons 17–13. Drive: 10 plays, 53 yards, TOP 2:56
- 0:23 UVA – Taquan Mizzell 45-yard pass from Kurt Benkert (Sam Hayward kick), Cavaliers 20–17. Drive: 4 plays, 70 yards, TOP 1:35

Fourth quarter

- 7:51 WFU – Mike Weaver 36-yard field goal, Tied 20–20. Drive: 4 plays, -7 yards, TOP 0:54
- 6:47 WFU – Jessie Bates 39-yard interception return (Mike Weaver kick), Demon Deacons 27–20. Drive: 3 plays, -12 yards, TOP 1:04

Leading Passers

- UVA–Kurt Benkert, 20/39, 190 yards, 2 touchdowns, 2 interceptions
- WF–John Wolford, 9/10, 83 yards, 1 touchdown

Leading Rushers

- UVA–Taquan Mizzell, 16 carries, 80 yards
- WF–John Wolford, 16 carries, 94 yards, 1 touchdown

Leading Receivers

- UVA–Doni Dowling, 8 receptions, 76 yards, 1 touchdown
- WF–Cam Serigne, 2 receptions, 24 yards, 1 touchdown

Leading Tacklers

- UVA–Micah Kiser, 11 tackles
- WF–Marquel Lee, 7 tackles

=== @ Louisville ===
4th meeting. 0–3 all time. Last meeting 2015, 20–19 Cardinals in Winston–Salem.

Week Eleven: Wake Forest Demon Deacons at Louisville Cardinals – Game summary

Quarter	1	2	3	4	Total
Demon Deacons	6	6	0	0	12
#5 Cardinals	0	3	7	34	44

at Papa John's Cardinal Stadium, Louisville, KY

- Date: November 12
- Game time: 7:00 p.m. EST
- Game weather: 48° F • ENE 3 • Clear
- Game attendance: 51,218
- Referee: J. Maconaghy
- TV announcers (ESPN2): Play-by-Play: Jason Benetti • Color Analyst: Kelly Stouffer • Sideline: Paul Carcaterra
- Final Stats

Game information

First quarter

- 11:24 WFU – Mike Weaver 37-yard field goal, Demon Deacons 3–0. Drive: 8 plays, 20 yards, TOP 3:18
- 5:27 WFU – Mike Weaver 45-yard field goal, Demon Deacons 6–0. Drive: 9 plays, 34 yards, TOP 4:31

Second quarter

- 8:19 WFU – Mike Weaver 33-yard field goal, Demon Deacons 9–0. Drive: 12 plays, 63 yards, TOP 6:16
- 2:49 WFU – Mike Weaver 38-yard field goal, Demon Deacons 12–0. Drive: 10 plays, 32 yards, TOP 5:03
- 0:18 LOU – Blanton Creque 28-yard field goal, Demon Deacons 12–3. Drive: 11 plays, 66 yards, TOP 2:31

Third quarter

- 7:30 LOU – Brandon Radcliff 55-yard run (Blanton Creque kick), Demon Deacons 12–10. Drive: 2 plays, 63 yards, TOP 0:43

Fourth quarter

- 10:35 LOU – Brandon Radcliff 7-yard run (two-point pass conversion failed), Cardinals 16–12. Drive: 9 plays, 65 yards, TOP 3:34
- 7:36 LOU – Brandon Radcliff 19-yard run (Blanton Creque kick), Cardinals 23–12. Drive: 4 plays, 43 yards, TOP 1:22
- 4:05 LOU – Cole Hikutini 2-yard pass from Lamar Jackson (Blanton Creque kick), Cardinals 30–12. Drive: 6 plays, 37 yards, TOP 1:47
- 3:44 LOU – Ronald Walker 31-yard interception return (Blanton Creque kick), Cardinals 37–12. Drive: 2 plays, 0 yards, TOP 0:21
- 0:50 LOU – Malik Williams 2-yard run (Blanton Creque kick), Cardinals 44–12. Drive: 4 plays, 52 yards, TOP 0:56

Leading Passers

- WF–John Wolford, 13/22, 141 yards
- LOU–Lamar Jackson, 14/26, 145 yards, 1 touchdown

Leading Rushers

- WF–Cade Carney, 17 carries, 50 yards
- LOU–Lamar Jackson, 22 carries, 153 yards

Leading Receivers

- WF–Cortez Lewis, 4 receptions, 41 yards
- LOU–Traveon Samuel, 2 receptions, 42 yards

Leading Tacklers

- WF–Jessie Bates III, 13 tackles
- LOU–Devonte Fields, 9 tackles

=== Clemson ===
82nd meeting. 17–63–1 all time. Last meeting 2015, 33–13 Tigers in Clemson.

Week Twelve: Clemson Tigers at Wake Forest Demon Deacons – Game summary

Quarter	1	2	3	4	Total
#5 Tigers	21	7	0	7	35
Demon Deacons	0	10	3	0	13

at BB&T Field, Winston-Salem, NC

- Date: November 19
- Game time: 7:00 p.m. EST
- Game weather: 44° F • NW 16 • Clear
- Game attendance: 31,512
- Referee: Jeff Flanagan
- TV announcers (ESPN): Play-by-Play: Bob Wischusen • Color Analyst: Brock Huard • Sideline: Allison Williams
- Final Stats

Game information

First quarter

- 11:24 CLEM – Wayne Gallman 42-yard run (Greg Huegel kick), Tigers 7–0. Drive: 4 plays, 51 yards, TOP 1:22
- 6:22 CLEM – Deshaun Watson 3-yard run (Greg Huegel kick), Tigers 14–0. Drive: 7 plays, 59 yards, TOP 2:06
- 1:10 CLEM – Mike Williams 15-yard pass from Deshaun Watson (Greg Huegel kick), Tigers 21–0. Drive: 9 plays, 68 yards, TOP 3:28

Second quarter

- 12:44 CLEM – Deshaun Watson 2-yard run (Greg Huegel kick), Tigers 28–0. Drive: 8 plays, 52 yards, TOP 2:58
- 10:04 WFU – Mike Weaver 42-yard field goal, Tigers 28–3. Drive: 4 plays, 3 yards, TOP 0:37
- 3:31 WFU – Cade Carney 1-yard run (Mike Weaver kick), Tigers 28–10. Drive: 6 plays, 64 yards, TOP 2:47

Third quarter

- 5:30 WFU – Mike Weaver 23-yard field goal, Tigers 28–13. Drive: 7 plays, 82 yards, TOP 2:16

Fourth quarter

- 10:50 CLEM – Wayne Gallman 1-yard run (Greg Huegel kick), Tigers 35–13. Drive: 13 plays, 80 yards, TOP 5:25

Leading Passers

- CLEM–Deshaun Watson, 23/33, 202 yards, 1 touchdown
- WF–Kyle Kearns, 7/18, 126 yards

Leading Rushers

- CLEM–Wayne Gallman, 22 carries, 161 yards, 2 touchdowns
- WF–Cade Carney, 18 carries, 59 yards, 1 touchdown

Leading Receivers

- CLEM–Mike Williams, 6 receptions, 58 yards, 1 touchdown
- WF–Chuck Wade, 2 receptions, 55 yards

Leading Tacklers

- CLEM–Kendall Joseph, 7 tackles
- WF–Jessie Bates, 12 tackles

=== Boston College ===
24th meeting. 9–12–2 all time. Last meeting 2015, 3–0 Demon Deacons in Chestnut Hill.

Week Thirteen: Boston College Eagles at Wake Forest Demon Deacons – Game summary

Quarter	1	2	3	4	Total
Eagles	10	0	0	7	17
Demon Deacons	0	0	14	0	14

at BB&T Field, Winston-Salem, NC

- Date: November 26
- Game time: 3:00 p.m. EST
- Game weather: 52° F • WNW 12 • Clear
- Game attendance: 24,866
- Referee: David Epperley
- TV announcers (ACCRSN): Play-by-Play: Bob Wischusen • Color Analyst: Brock Huard • Sideline: Allison Williams
- Final Stats

Game information

First quarter

- 10:16 BC – Mike Knoll 22-yard field goal, Eagles 3–0. Drive: 4 plays, 7 yards, TOP 1:29
- 1:19 BC – Myles Willis 11-yard run (Mike Knoll kick), Eagles 10–0. Drive: 5 plays, 25 yards, TOP 2:03

Second quarter

- No Scoring

Third quarter

- 7:47 WFU – Cam Serigne 5-yard pass from John Wolford (Mike Weaver kick), Eagles 10–7. Drive: 8 plays, 50 yards, TOP 3:55
- 4:53 WFU – Cortez Lewis 37-yard pass from John Wolford (Mike Weaver kick), Demon Deacons 14–10. Drive: 3 plays, 65 yards, TOP 1:24

Fourth quarter

- 8:03 BC – Tom Sweeney 13-yard pass from Patrick Towles (Mike Knoll kick), Eagles 17–14. Drive: 8 plays, 73 yards, TOP 4:35

Leading Passers

- BC–Patrick Towles, 10/23, 74 yards, 1 touchdown
- WF–John Wolford, 16/33, 137 yards, 2 touchdowns, 2 interceptions

Leading Rushers

- BC–Tyler Rouse, 1 carry, 27 yards
- WF–John Wolford, 14 carries, 69 yards

Leading Receivers

- BC–Tommy Sweeney, 4 receptions, 39 yards, 1 touchdown
- WF–Cam Serigne, 6 receptions, 49 yards, 1 touchdown

Leading Tacklers

- BC–Connor Stracthan, 10 tackles
- WF–Marquel Lee, 11 tackles

=== Vs. Temple – Military Bowl ===
2nd meeting. 0–1 all time. Last meeting 1930, 36–0 Owls in Philadelphia.

Military Bowl: Wake Forest Demon Deacons vs. Temple Owls – Game summary

Quarter	1	2	3	4	Total
#23 Owls	7	3	10	6	26
Demon Deacons	14	17	0	3	34

at Navy–Marine Corps Memorial Stadium, Annapolis, MD

- Date: December 27
- Game time: 3:30 p.m. EST
- Game weather: 63° F • W 5–10 • Partly cloudy
- Game attendance: 26,656
- Referee: Kevin Stine
- TV announcers (ESPN): Play-by-Play: Jason Benetti • Color Analyst: Kelly Stouffer • Sideline: Paul Carcaterra
- Final Stats

Game information

First quarter

- 13:33 TEM – Adonis Jennings 48-yard pass from Phillip Walker (Aaron Boumerhi kick), Owls 7–0. Drive: 1 play, 48 yards, TOP 0:09
- 8:37 WFU – Cam Serigne 41-yard pass from John Wolford (Mike Weaver kick), Tied 7–7. Drive: 4 plays, 60 yards, TOP 1:06
- 5:20 WFU – Tabari Hines 20-yard pass from John Wolford (Mike Weaver kick), Demon Deacons 14–7. Drive: 4 plays, 54 yards, TOP 0:57

Second quarter

- 12:26 WFU – Cade Carney 11-yard run (Mike Weaver kick), Demon Deacons 21–7. Drive: 1 play, 11 yards, TOP 0:08
- 8:34 WFU – Mike Weaver 25-yard field goal, Demon Deacons 24–7. Drive: 10 plays, 62 yards, TOP 2:08
- 3:02 WFU – Matt Colburn 3-yard run (Mike Weaver kick), Demon Deacons 31–7. Drive: 9 plays, 39 yards, TOP 2:34
- 0:04 TEM – Aaron Boumerhi 45-yard field goal, Demon Deacons 31–10. Drive: 11 plays, 57 yards, TOP 2:58

Third quarter

- 14:08 TEM – Adonis Jennings 58-yard pass from Phillip Walker (Aaron Boumerhi kick), Demon Deacons 31–17. Drive: 3 plays, 75 yards, TOP 0:52
- 3:51 TEM – Aaron Boumerhi 24-yard field goal, Demon Deacons 31–20. Drive: 11 plays, 74 yards, TOP 5:13

Fourth quarter

- 9:36 TEM – Aaron Boumerhi 32-yard field goal, Demon Deacons 31–23. Drive: 8 plays, 44 yards, TOP 3:14
- 3:56 TEM – Aaron Boumerhi 38-yard field goal, Demon Deacons 31–26. Drive: 10 plays, 56 yards, TOP 3:39
- 1:59 WFU – Mike Weaver 30-yard field goal, Demon Deacons 34–26. Drive: 4 plays, 3 yards, TOP 1:57

Leading Passers

- TEM–P. J. Walker, 28/49, 396 yards, 2 touchdowns, 1 interception
- WF–John Wolford, 10/19, 183 yards, 2 touchdowns, 1 interception

Leading Rushers

- TEM–Jahad Thomas, 7 carries, 35 yards
- WF–Cade Carney, 17 carries, 71 yards, 1 touchdown

Leading Receivers

- TEM–Adonis Jennings, 7 receptions, 154 yards, 2 touchdowns
- WF–Cam Serigne, 3 receptions, 68 yards, 1 touchdown

Leading Tacklers

- TEM–Averee Robinson, 9 tackles
- WF–Brad Watson, 7 tackles

== Leaks of plays ==
Colloquially called "WakeyLeaks", some of Wake Forest's opponents appear to have had knowledge of Wake Forest's playbook, even plays they had just created and only practiced for one week. Suspicion fell on Tommy Elrod, a color commentator on the broadcast crew; Elrod was found to have made long phone calls to the coaches of rival teams in the days before Wake Forest played them, and he had access to the practice tapes compiled by Wake Forest staff. Elrod had been an assistant coach during the leadership of previous coach Jim Grobe; it is speculated that after Clawson did not hire him on as a coach, instead relegating him to color commentary, he leaked the plays as a form of revenge. Elrod was fired and banned from the campus in December 2016.
