= 2016 Atlantic Coast Conference football season =

2016 ACC football season
- League: NCAA Division I Football Bowl Subdivision
- Sport: Football
- Duration: September 2016 to January 2017
- Teams: 14

2017 NFL Draft
- Top draft pick: Mitchell Trubisky (North Carolina)
- Picked by: Chicago Bears, 2nd overall

Regular season
- Season MVP: Lamar Jackson (Louisville)
- Top scorer: Lamar Jackson (126 points)
- Atlantic champions: Clemson
- Atlantic runners-up: Louisville
- Coastal champions: Virginia Tech
- Coastal runners-up: North Carolina

ACC Championship Game
- Venue: Camping World Stadium, Orlando, Florida
- Champions: Clemson
- Runners-up: Virginia Tech

ACC seasons
- ← 2015 2017 →

2016 Atlantic Coast Conference football standings
| | Conf. | | | Overall |
| Team | W | | L | W | | L |
|---|---|---|---|---|---|---|
Atlantic Division
| No. 1 Clemson xy$# | 7 | – | 1 | 14 | – | 1 |
| No. 21 Louisville x | 7 | – | 1 | 9 | – | 4 |
| No. 8 Florida State | 5 | – | 3 | 10 | – | 3 |
| NC State | 3 | – | 5 | 7 | – | 6 |
| Wake Forest | 3 | – | 5 | 7 | – | 6 |
| Boston College | 2 | – | 6 | 7 | – | 6 |
| Syracuse | 2 | – | 6 | 4 | – | 8 |
Coastal Division
| No. 16 Virginia Tech xy | 6 | – | 2 | 10 | – | 4 |
| North Carolina | 5 | – | 3 | 8 | – | 5 |
| No. 20 Miami (FL) | 5 | – | 3 | 9 | – | 4 |
| Pittsburgh | 5 | – | 3 | 8 | – | 5 |
| Georgia Tech | 4 | – | 4 | 9 | – | 4 |
| Duke | 1 | – | 7 | 4 | – | 8 |
| Virginia | 1 | – | 7 | 2 | – | 10 |
Championship: Clemson 42, Virginia Tech 35
# – College Football Playoff champion; $ – Conference champion; x – Division champion/co-champions; y – Championship game participant; Rankings from AP Poll

The 2016 Atlantic Coast Conference football season was the 64th season of college football play for the Atlantic Coast Conference (ACC), played from September 2016 to January 2017. The Atlantic Coast Conference consists of 14 members in two divisions. The Atlantic Division consists of Boston College, Clemson, Florida State, Louisville, North Carolina State, Syracuse, and Wake Forest. The Coastal Division consists of Duke, Georgia Tech, Miami, North Carolina, Pittsburgh, Virginia, and Virginia Tech. The two division champions met on December 3 in the 2016 ACC Championship Game. The game was originally scheduled to be played at Bank of America Stadium in Charlotte, North Carolina, but on September 14 the conference announced that the game would be moved to a neutral venue outside of North Carolina due to the controversy surrounding the Public Facilities Privacy & Security Act (commonly known as House Bill 2, or HB2).

== Preseason ==
=== Preseason Poll ===
The 2016 ACC Preseason Poll was announced following the ACC Football Kickoff meetings in Charlotte, North Carolina on July 21–22. North Carolina and Clemson were each selected to repeat in their respective divisions. Deshaun Watson of Clemson was once again voted the Preseason ACC Player of the Year. It was voted on by 191 media members, all of which were in attendance for the ACC Football Kickoff.

==== Atlantic Division poll ====
1. Clemson – 1,293 (148 first place votes)
2. Florida State – 1,176 (42)
3. Louisville – 961 (1)
4. North Carolina State – 704
5. Boston College – 441
6. Syracuse – 426
7. Wake Forest – 347

==== Coastal Division poll ====
1. North Carolina – 1,238 (121)
2. Miami – 1,108 (50)
3. Pittsburgh – 859 (14)
4. Virginia Tech – 697 (3)
5. Duke – 597 (2)
6. Georgia Tech – 588 (1)
7. Virginia – 261

==== Preseason ACC Player of the Year ====
1. Deshaun Watson, CLEM – 164
2. Dalvin Cook, FSU – 18
3. Elijah Hood, UNC – 4
4. Brad Kaaya, MIA – 2
5. Lamar Jackson, LOU – 2
6. DeVon Edwards, DU – 1

=== Preseason All Conference Teams ===
==== Offense ====
| Position | Player | School |
|---|---|---|
| Wide receiver | Artavis Scott | Clemson |
| Wide receiver | Isaiah Ford | Virginia Tech |
| Wide receiver | Travis Rudolph | Florida State |
| Tight end | Jordan Leggett | Clemson |
| Tackle | Roderick Johnson | Florida State |
| Tackle | Mitch Hyatt | Clemson |
| Guard | Dorian Johnson | Pittsburgh |
| Guard | Tyrone Crowder | Clemson |
| Center | Jay Guillermo | Clemson |
| Quarterback | Deshaun Watson | Clemson |
| Running back | Dalvin Cook | Florida State |
| Running back | Elijah Hood | North Carolina |

==== Defense ====
| Position | Player | School |
|---|---|---|
| Defensive end | DeMarcus Walker | Florida State |
| Defensive end | Ejuan Price | Pittsburgh |
| Defensive tackle | Carlos Watkins | Clemson |
| Defensive tackle | DeAngelo Brown | Louisville |
| Linebacker | Ben Boulware | Clemson |
| Linebacker | Keith Kelsey | Louisville |
| Linebacker | Devonte Fields | Louisville |
| Cornerback | Cordrea Tankersley | Clemson |
| Cornerback | Des Lawrence | North Carolina |
| Safety | Derwin James | Florida State |
| Safety | Quin Blanding | Virginia |

==== Specialist ====
| Position | Player | School |
|---|---|---|
| Placekicker | Greg Huegel | Clemson |
| Punter | Justin Vogel | Miami |
| Specialist | Ryan Switzer | North Carolina |

== Coaches ==
Note: Stats shown are before the beginning of the season

| Team | Head coach | Years at school | Overall record | Record at school | ACC record |
|---|---|---|---|---|---|
| Boston College | Steve Addazio | 4 | 27–23 | 14–12 | 8–16 |
| Clemson | Dabo Swinney | 9 | 61–26 | 61–26 | 48–14 |
| Duke | David Cutcliffe | 9 | 84–77 | 40–48 | 24–40 |
| Florida State | Jimbo Fisher | 6 | 58–11 | 58–11 | 40–8 |
| Georgia Tech | Paul Johnson | 9 | 166–74 | 58–35 | 38–26 |
| Louisville | Bobby Petrino | 7 | 104–39 | 62–18 | 12–6 |
| Miami | Mark Richt | 1 | 145–51 | 0–0 | 0–0 |
| North Carolina | Larry Fedora | 5 | 55–36 | 21–17 | 21–11 |
| NC State | Dave Doeren | 4 | 34–18 | 11–14 | 6–18 |
| Pittsburgh | Pat Narduzzi | 2 | 8–5 | 8–5 | 6–2 |
| Syracuse | Dino Babers | 1 | 37–16 | 0–0 | 0–0 |
| Virginia | Bronco Mendenhall | 1 | 99–43 | 0–0 | 0–0 |
| Virginia Tech | Justin Fuente | 1 | 26–23 | 0–0 | 0–0 |
| Wake Forest | Dave Clawson | 3 | 93–88 | 3–9 | 2–14 |

== Rankings ==
Legend
| | Improvement in ranking |
| | Drop in ranking |
| | Not ranked previous week |
| RV | Received votes but were not ranked in Top 25 of poll |

| | | Pre | Wk 1 | Wk 2 | Wk 3 | Wk 4 | Wk 5 | Wk 6 | Wk 7 | Wk 8 | Wk 9 | Wk 10 | Wk 11 | Wk 12 | Wk 13 | Wk 14 | Final |
|---|---|---|---|---|---|---|---|---|---|---|---|---|---|---|---|---|---|
| Boston College | AP | | | | | | | | | | | | | | | | |
| Boston College | C | | | | | | | | | | | | | | | | |
| Boston College | CFP | Not released | | | | | | | | | | | | | | | |
| Clemson | AP | 2 (16) | 2 (2) | 5 | 5 | 5 | 3 (1) | 3 (2) | 4 | 3 | 3 | 3 | 5 | 4 | 3 | 3 | 1 (60) |
| Clemson | C | 2 (7) | 2 (2) | 3 (1) | 3 (1) | 3 (1) | 3 (2) | 3 (1) | 3 (1) | 3 (1) | 3 (1) | 2 (2) | 5 | 3 | 3 | 3 | 1 |
| Clemson | CFP | Not released | | | | | | | | | 2 | 2 | 4 | 4 | 3 | 2 | |
| Duke | AP | | | | | | | | | | | | | | | | |
| Duke | C | RV | RV | | | | | | | | | | | | | | |
| Duke | CFP | Not released | | | | | | | | | | | | | | | |
| Florida State | AP | 4 (5) | 3 (4) | 2 (4) | 13 | 12 | 23 | 14 | 13 | 12 | 19 | 20 | 17 | 15 | 12 | 10 | 8 |
| Florida State | C | 4 (1) | 3 | 2 (1) | 14 | 12 | 23 | 16 | 15 | 14 | 19 | 18 | 15 | 14 | 12 | 10 | 8 |
| Florida State | CFP | Not released | | | | | | | | | 22 | 18 | 17 | 14 | 12 | 11 | |
| Georgia Tech | AP | | | | RV | | | | | | | | | | | | |
| Georgia Tech | C | | | | RV | | | | | | | | | | | | |
| Georgia Tech | CFP | Not released | | | | | | | | | | | | | | | |
| Louisville | AP | 19 | 13 | 10 | 3 (6) | 3 (6) | 7 | 7 | 7 | 5 | 5 | 5 | 3 | 11 | 16 | 15 | 21 |
| Louisville | C | 23 | 15 | 10 | 4 | 4 | 8 | 7 | 7 | 5 | 5 | 6 | 3 | 11 | 15 | 14 | 20 |
| Louisville | CFP | Not released | | | | | | | | | 7 | 6 | 5 | 11 | 13 | 13 | |
| Miami | AP | RV | 25 | 25 | 15 | 14 | 10 | 16 | RV | | | | | | | | 20 |
| Miami | C | RV | RV | 25 | 19 | 14 | 10 | 17 | RV | RV | | | | | | | 23 |
| Miami | CFP | Not released | | | | | | | | | | | | | | | |
| North Carolina | AP | 22 | RV | RV | RV | RV | 17 | RV | 22 | 21 | 18 | 15 | RV | | | | |
| North Carolina | C | 20 | RV | RV | RV | 23 | 16 | RV | 21 | 20 | 17 | 13 | 24 | 25 | RV | | |
| North Carolina | CFP | Not released | | | | | | | | | 21 | 17 | | | | | |
| NC State | AP | | | | | | | RV | RV | | | | | | | | |
| NC State | C | | RV | | | | | RV | RV | | | | | | | | |
| NC State | CFP | Not released | | | | | | | | | | | | | | | |
| Pittsburgh | AP | RV | RV | RV | | | | | RV | RV | | | RV | RV | 24 | 22 | RV |
| Pittsburgh | C | RV | RV | RV | | | | RV | RV | RV | RV | | RV | RV | RV | RV | |
| Pittsburgh | CFP | Not released | | | | | | | | | | | | | 25 | 23 | |
| Syracuse | AP | | | | | | | | | | | | | | | | |
| Syracuse | C | | | | | | | | | | | | | | | | |
| Syracuse | CFP | Not released | | | | | | | | | | | | | | | |
| Virginia | AP | | | | | | | | | | | | | | | | |
| Virginia | C | | | | | | | | | | | | | | | | |
| Virginia | CFP | Not released | | | | | | | | | | | | | | | |
| Virginia Tech | AP | | | | RV | RV | 25 | 17 | RV | 25 | 23 | 18 | RV | RV | 19 | 18 | 16 |
| Virginia Tech | C | | | | | RV | RV | 19 | RV | 25 | 17 | 22 | RV | RV | 18 | 19 | 16 |
| Virginia Tech | CFP | Not released | | | | | | | | | 19 | 14 | | | 23 | 22 | |
| Wake Forest | AP | | | | | RV | | RV | | | | | | | | | |
| Wake Forest | C | | | | | RV | RV | RV | | | | | | | | | |
| Wake Forest | CFP | Not released | | | | | | | | | | | | | | | |

== Postseason ==
=== Bowl games ===
Legend
| ACC win |
| ACC loss |

| Bowl game | Date | Site | Television | Time (EST) | ACC team | Opponent | Score | Attendance |
|---|---|---|---|---|---|---|---|---|
| New Era Pinstripe Bowl | December 26 | Yankee Stadium • New York, NY | ESPN | 2:00 p.m. | No. 23 Pittsburgh Panthers | Northwestern Wildcats | L 24–31 | 37,918 |
| Quick Lane Bowl | December 26 | Ford Field • Detroit, MI | ESPN | 2:30 p.m. | Boston College | Maryland | W 36–30 | 19,117 |
| Camping World Independence Bowl | December 26 | Independence Stadium • Shreveport, LA | ESPN2 | 5:00 p.m. | North Carolina State Wolfpack | Vanderbilt Commodores | W 41–17 | 28,995 |
| Military Bowl Presented by Northrop Grumman | December 28 | Navy–Marine Corps Memorial Stadium • Annapolis, MD | ESPN | 3:30 p.m. | Wake Forest Demon Deacons | Temple Owls | W 34–26 | 26,656 |
| Russell Athletic Bowl | December 29 | Camping World Stadium • Orlando, FL | ESPN | 5:30 p.m. | Miami Hurricanes | No. 16 West Virginia | W 31–14 | 48,625 |
| Hyundai Sun Bowl | December 30 | Sun Bowl Stadium • El Paso, TX | CBS | 2:00 p.m. | North Carolina Tar Heels | No. 18 Stanford Cardinal | L 25–23 | 42,166 |
| Belk Bowl | December 30 | Bank of America Stadium • Charlotte, NC | ESPN | 5:30 p.m. | No. 22 Virginia Tech Hokies | Arkansas Razorbacks | W 35–24 | 46,902 |
| Orange Bowl | December 30 | Hard Rock Stadium • Miami Gardens, Florida | ESPN | 8:00 p.m. | Florida State Seminoles | Michigan Wolverines | W 33–32 | 67,432 |
| Taxslayer Bowl | December 31 | EverBank Field • Jacksonville, FL | ESPN | 11:00 a.m. | Georgia Tech Yellow Jackets | Kentucky Wildcats | W 33–18 | 43,102 |
College Football Playoff bowl games
| Fiesta Bowl (CFP Semifinal) | December 31 | University of Phoenix Stadium • Glendale, AZ | ESPN | 7:00 p.m. | No. 2 Clemson Tigers | No. 3 Ohio State Buckeyes | W 31–0 | 70,236 |
| CFP National Championship | January 9 | Raymond James Stadium • Tampa, FL | ESPN | 8:00 p.m. | No. 2 Clemson Tigers | No. 1 Alabama Crimson Tide | W 35–31 | 74,512 |

* Rankings based on CFP rankings

=== All-conference teams ===
First Team

| Position | Player | Class | Team |
|---|---|---|---|
First Team Offense
| QB | Lamar Jackson | So | Louisville |
| RB | Dalvin Cook | Jr | Florida State |
| RB | James Conner | Jr (redshirt) | Pittsburgh |
| WR | Mike Williams | Jr (redshirt) | Clemson |
| WR | Amba Etta-Tawo | Sr (redshirt) | Syracuse |
| WR | Ryan Switzer | Sr | North Carolina |
| TE | Jordan Leggett | Sr | Clemson |
| T | Roderick Johnson | Jr | Florida State |
| T | Mitch Hyatt | So | Clemson |
| G | Tyrone Crowder | Jr (redshirt) | Clemson |
| G | Dorian Johnson | Sr | Pittsburgh |
| C | Jay Guillermo | Sr (redshirt) | Clemson |
First Team Defense
| DE | DeMarcus Walker | Sr | Florida State |
| DE | Ejuan Price | Sr (redshirt) | Pittsburgh |
| DT | Carlos Watkins | Sr (redshirt) | Clemson |
| DT | Woody Baron | Sr | Virginia Tech |
| LB | Ben Boulware | Sr | Clemson |
| LB | Micah Kiser | Jr | Virginia |
| LB | Devonte Fields | Sr | Louisville |
| CB | Tarvarus McFadden | So | Florida State |
| CB | Cordrea Tankersley | Sr | Clemson |
| S | Quin Blanding | Jr | Virginia |
| S | Jadar Johnson | Sr | Clemson |
First Team Special Teams
| PK | Mike Weaver | Jr (redshirt) | Wake Forest |
| P | Nicholas Conte | Sr | Virginia |
| SP | Quadree Henderson | So | Pittsburgh |

Second Team

| Position | Player | Class | Team |
|---|---|---|---|
Second Team Offense
| QB | Deshaun Watson | Jr | Clemson |
| RB | Matthew Dayes | Sr | North Carolina State |
| RB | Wayne Gallman | Jr (redshirt) | Clemson |
| WR | Isaiah Ford | Jr | Virginia Tech |
| WR | Travis Rudolph | Jr | Florida State |
| WR | Ahmmon Richards | Fr | Miami |
| TE | Cole Hikutini | Sr | Louisville |
| T | Adam Bisnowaty | Sr (redshirt) | Pittsburgh |
| T | Jon Heck | Sr | North Carolina |
| G | Tony Adams | Jr | North Carolina State |
| G | Kareem Are | Sr (redshirt) | Florida State |
| C | Lucas Crowley | Sr | North Carolina |
Second Team Defense
| DE | Harold Landry | Jr | Boston College |
| DE | Christian Wilkins | So | Clemson |
| DT | Dexter Lawrence | Fr | Clemson |
| DT | DeAngelo Brown | Sr | Louisville |
| LB | Marquel Lee | Sr | Wake Forest |
| LB | Keith Kelsey | Sr | Louisville |
| LB | Tremaine Edmunds | So | Virginia Tech |
| CB | Jaire Alexander | So | Louisville |
| CB | Corn Elder | Sr | Miami |
| S | Jordan Whitehead | So | Pittsburgh |
| S | Jessie Bates | Fr | Wake Forest |
Second Team Special Teams
| PK | Greg Huegel | So (redshirt) | Clemson |
| P | Justin Vogel | Sr | Miami |
| SP | T. J. Logan | Sr | North Carolina |

Third Team

| Position | Player | Class | Team |
|---|---|---|---|
Third Team Offense
| QB | Mitch Trubisky | Jr | North Carolina |
| RB | Mark Walton | So | Miami |
| RB | Elijah Hood | Jr | North Carolina |
| WR | Artavis Scott | Jr | Clemson |
| WR | James Quick | Sr | Louisville |
| WR | Stacy Coley | Sr | Miami |
| TE | Bucky Hodges | Jr (redshirt) | Virginia Tech |
| T | Brian O'Neill | So (redshirt) | Pittsburgh |
| T | Jonathan McLaughlin | Sr | Virginia Tech |
| G | Augie Conte | Sr (redshirt) | Virginia Tech |
| G | Danny Isidora | Sr | Miami |
| C | Freddie Burden | Sr (redshirt) | Georgia Tech |
Third Team Defense
| DE | Bradley Chubb | Jr | North Carolina State |
| DE | Duke Ejiofor | Jr (redshirt) | Wake Forest |
| DT | Derrick Nnadi | Jr | Florida State |
| DT | Nazair Jones | Jr | North Carolina |
| LB | Ben Humphreys | So | Duke |
| LB | Andrew Motuapuaka | Jr (redshirt) | Virginia Tech |
| LB | Zaire Franklin | Jr | Syracuse |
| CB | Greg Stroman | Jr | Virginia Tech |
| CB | Breon Borders | Sr | Duke |
| S | Josh Harvey-Clemons | Sr | Louisville |
| S | Chucky Williams | Jr | Louisville |
Third Team Special Teams
| PK | Joey Slye | Jr | Virginia Tech |
| P | Sterling Hofrichter | Fr (redshirt) | Syracuse |
| SP | Brisly Estime | Sr | Syracuse |

=== ACC individual awards ===
ACC Player of the Year

Lamar Jackson, Louisville

Rookie of the Year

Deondre Francois, Florida State

Coach of the Year

Justin Fuente, Virginia Tech

Offensive Player of the Year

Lamar Jackson

Offensive Rookie of the Year

Deondre Francois, Florida State

Jacobs Blocking Trophy

Roderick Johnson, Florida State

Defensive Player of the Year

DeMarcus Walker, Florida State

Defensive Rookie of the Year

Dexter Lawrence, Clemson

== Home game attendance ==
| Team | Stadium | Capacity | Game 1 | Game 2 | Game 3 | Game 4 | Game 5 | Game 6 | Game 7 | Total | Average | % of Capacity |
|---|---|---|---|---|---|---|---|---|---|---|---|---|
| Boston College | Alumni Stadium | 44,500 | 22,728 | 24,203 | 44,500† | 34,647 | 30,644 | 36,220 | – | 192,942 | 32,157 | 72.27% |
| Clemson | Memorial Stadium | 81,500 | 78,532 | 79,590 | **83,362**† | 81,200 | 80,609 | 81,048 | **81,542** | 565,883 | 80,840 | 99.19% |
| Duke | Wallace Wade Stadium | 40,000 | 35,049 | 21,077 | 25,201 | 20,613 | **38,217** | **39,212**† | – | 179,369 | 29,894 | 74.74% |
| Florida State | Doak Campbell Stadium | 79,560 | 75,831 | 77,584 | 77,102 | 78,025 | 73,917 | 78,342† | – | 460,801 | 76,800 | 96.53% |
| Georgia Tech | Bobby Dodd Stadium | 55,000 | 49,992 | 41,916 | 53,932† | 53,047 | 47,609 | 43,886 | 42,136 | 332,518 | 47,502 | 86.37% |
| Louisville | Papa John's Cardinal Stadium | 55,000 | 53,127 | **55,632**† | **55,121** | **55,218** | 51,218 | 54,075 | – | 324,391 | 54,065 | 98.30% |
| Miami | Hard Rock Stadium | 65,326 | 60,703 | 57,123 | **65,685**† | 58,731 | 51,796 | 57,396 | – | 351,434 | 58,572 | 89.66% |
| North Carolina | Kenan Memorial Stadium | 63,000 | 56,000 | 54,500 | 33,000 | 58,000 | 41,000 | 59,000† | – | 301,500 | 50,250 | 79.76% |
| NC State | Carter–Finley Stadium | 57,583 | **57,774** | **57,810** | **58,200**† | **58,200**† | 56,443 | **57,789** | 56,263 | 402,479 | 57,497 | 99.85% |
| Pittsburgh | Heinz Field | 68,400 | 50,149 | **69,983**† | 45,246 | 47,425 | 40,254 | 35,425 | 34,049 | 322,531 | 46,075 | 67.36% |
| Syracuse | Carrier Dome | 49,262 | 31,336 | 32,184 | 32,288 | 33,838 | 34,842† | 32,340 | – | 196,828 | 32,804 | 66.59% |
| Virginia | Scott Stadium | 61,500 | 49,270† | 35,211 | 39,522 | 40,882 | 34,824 | 39,867 | – | 239,576 | 39,929 | 64.92% |
| Virginia Tech | Lane Stadium | 66,233 | 62,234 | 60,054 | 63,712 | 63,507 | 65,632† | 63,120 | – | 378,259 | 63,043 | 95.18% |
| Wake Forest | BB&T Field | 31,500 | 24,398 | 25,972 | 25,162 | 27,938 | 25,334 | 31,152† | 24,866 | 184,822 | 26,403 | 83.82% |

Bold – Exceeded capacity
†Season High

== NFL draft ==
| Round # | Pick # | NFL team | Player | Position | College |
|---|---|---|---|---|---|
| 1 | 2 | Chicago Bears^{(from San Francisco)} | Mitchell Trubisky | Quarterback | North Carolina |
| 1 | 7 | Los Angeles Chargers | Mike Williams | Wide receiver | Clemson |
| 1 | 12 | Houston Texans^{(from Philadelphia via Cleveland)} | Deshaun Watson | Quarterback | Clemson |
| 1 | 29 | Cleveland Browns^{(from Green Bay)} | David Njoku | Tight end | Miami |
| 2 | 41 | Minnesota Vikings^{(from Cincinnati)} | Dalvin Cook | Running back | Florida State |
| 2 | 51 | Denver Broncos | DeMarcus Walker | Defensive end | Florida State |
| 2 | 61 | Green Bay Packers | Josh Jones | Safety | NC State |
| 3 | 91 | Los Angeles Rams^{(from Kansas City via Buffalo)} | John Johnson | Safety | Boston College |
| 3 | 97 | Miami Dolphins | Cordrea Tankersley | Cornerback | Clemson |
| 3 | 102 | Seattle Seahawks | Nazair Jones | Defensive tackle | North Carolina |
| 3 | 105 | Pittsburgh Steelers | James Conner | Running back | Pittsburgh |
| 4 | 113 | Los Angeles Chargers | Rayshawn Jenkins | Safety | Miami |
| 4 | 115 | Arizona Cardinals^{(from Carolina)} | Dorian Johnson | Guard | Pittsburgh |
| 4 | 118 | Philadelphia Eagles | Mack Hollins | Wide receiver | North Carolina |
| 4 | 133 | Dallas Cowboys | Ryan Switzer | Wide receiver | North Carolina |
| 4 | 140 | New York Giants | Wayne Gallman | Running back | Clemson |
| 4 | 142 | Houston Texans^{(from Cleveland)} | Carlos Watkins | Defensive tackle | Clemson |
| 5 | 150 | New York Jets | Jordan Leggett | Tight end | Clemson |
| 5 | 152 | Carolina Panthers | Corn Elder | Cornerback | Miami |
| 5 | 160 | Cleveland Browns^{(from Minnesota via NY Jets)} | Roderick Johnson | Tackle | Florida State |
| 5 | 163 | Buffalo Bills^{(from Denver via New England)} | Matt Milano | Linebacker | Boston College |
| 5 | 168 | Oakland Raiders | Marquel Lee | Linebacker | Wake Forest |
| 5 | 171 | Buffalo Bills^{(from Dallas)} | Nathan Peterman | Quarterback | Pittsburgh |
| 5 | 179 | Arizona Cardinals | T. J. Logan | Running back | North Carolina |
| 5 | 180 | Minnesota Vikings^{(from Kansas City)} | Danny Isidora | Guard | Miami |
| 6 | 186 | Baltimore Ravens^{(from San Francisco)} | Chuck Clark | Safety | Virginia Tech |
| 6 | 196 | New Orleans Saints | Al-Quadin Muhammad | Defensive end | Miami |
| 6 | 200 | New York Giants^{(from Indianapolis via New England and Tennessee)} | Adam Bisnowaty | Tackle | Pittsburgh |
| 6 | 201 | Minnesota Vikings^{(from Washington)} | Bucky Hodges | Tight end | Virginia Tech |
| 6 | 206 | Los Angeles Rams^{(from Miami)} | Sam Rogers | Fullback | Virginia Tech |
| 6 | 213 | Pittsburgh Steelers | Colin Holba | Long snapper | Louisville |
| 6 | 215 | Detroit Lions^{(from New England)} | Brad Kaaya | Quarterback | Miami |
| 6 | 216 | Dallas Cowboys^{(from Kansas City via New England)} | Marquez White | Cornerback | Florida State |
| 7 | 219 | Minnesota Vikings^{(from Cleveland via San Francisco)} | Stacy Coley | Wide receiver | Miami |
| 7 | 229 | San Francisco 49ers^{(from New Orleans)} | Adrian Colbert | Cornerback | Miami |
| 7 | 230 | Washington Redskins^{(from Philadelphia via Minnesota)} | Josh Harvey-Clemons | Safety | Louisville |
| 7 | 233 | Carolina Panthers^{(from Indianapolis via Cleveland)} | Harrison Butker | Kicker | Georgia Tech |
| 7 | 234 | Los Angeles Rams^{(from Baltimore)} | Ejuan Price | Linebacker | Pittsburgh |
| 7 | 237 | Miami Dolphins^{(from Tampa Bay)} | Isaiah Ford | Wide receiver | Virginia Tech |
| 7 | 240 | Jacksonville Jaguars^{(from Miami)} | Marquez Williams | Fullback | Miami |
| 7 | 242 | Oakland Raiders | Elijah Hood | Running back | North Carolina |
| 7 | 245 | Minnesota Vikings^{(from Kansas City)} | Jack Tocho | Cornerback | NC State |
| 7 | 252 | Cleveland Browns^{(from Denver)} | Matthew Dayes | Running back | NC State |
