= Carlos Watkins =

American football player (born 1993)

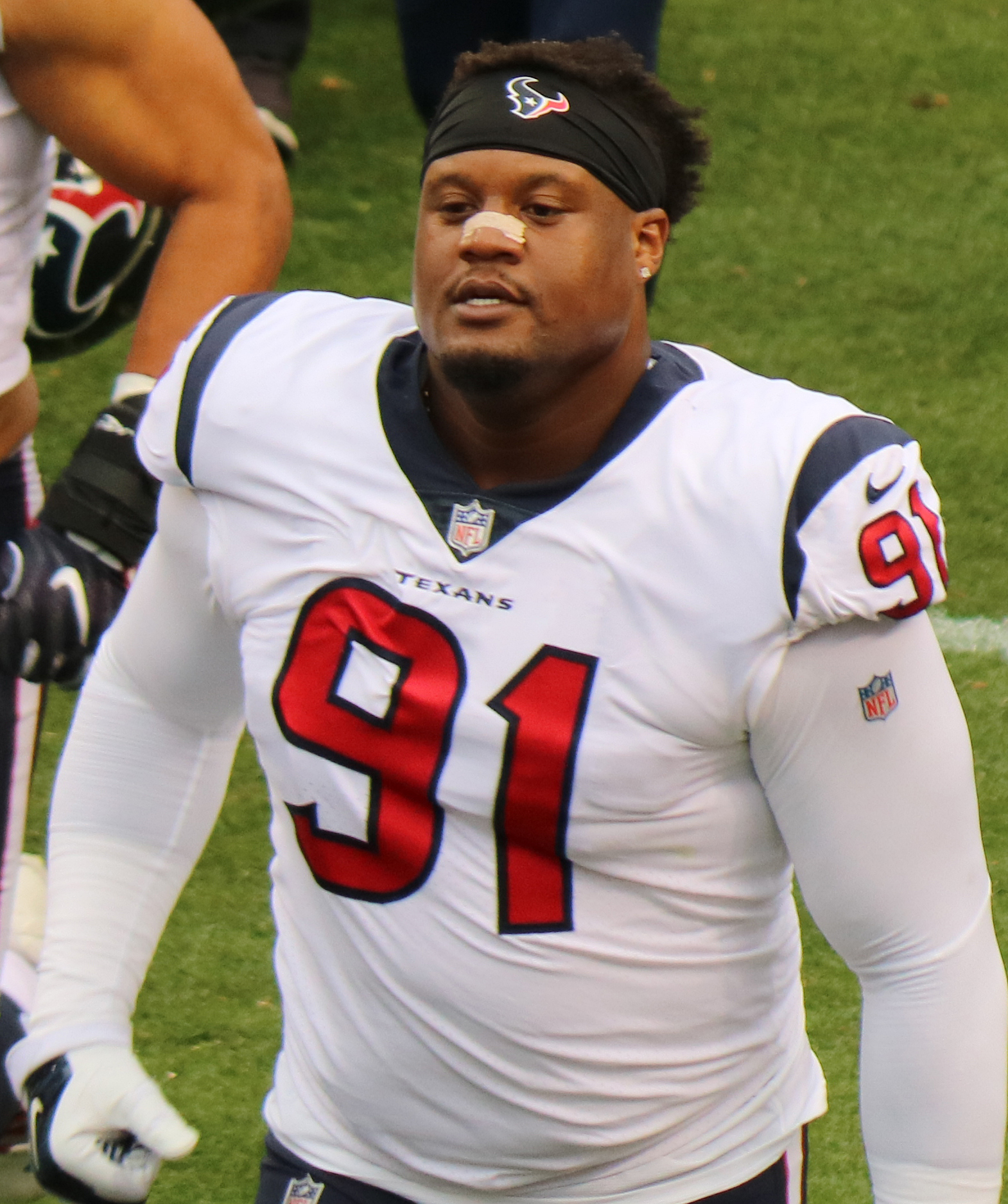
- Watkins with the Houston Texans in 2018

Profile
- Position: Defensive end

Personal information
- Born: December 5, 1993 (age 32); Forest City, North Carolina, U.S.
- Listed height: 6 ft 3 in (1.91 m)
- Listed weight: 305 lb (138 kg)

Career information
- High school: Chase (Forest City)
- College: Clemson (2012–2016)
- NFL draft: 2017: 4th round, 142nd overall pick

Career history
- Houston Texans (2017–2020); Dallas Cowboys (2021–2022); Arizona Cardinals (2023); Los Angeles Rams (2024)*; Washington Commanders (2024); Dallas Cowboys (2024); Tennessee Titans (2025)*
- * Offseason or practice squad member only

Awards and highlights
- CFP national champion (2016); First-team All-American (2016); 2× first-team All-ACC (2015, 2016)

Career NFL statistics as of 2024
- Total tackles: 151
- Sacks: 6.0
- Forced fumbles: 1
- Fumble recoveries: 3
- Interceptions: 1
- Defensive touchdowns: 1
- Stats at Pro Football Reference

Carlos Watkins (born December 5, 1993) is an American professional football defensive end. He played college football for the Clemson Tigers and was selected by the Houston Texans in the fourth round of the 2017 NFL draft. Watkins has also been a member of the Dallas Cowboys, Arizona Cardinals, Los Angeles Rams, and Washington Commanders.

== Early life ==
Watkins attended Chase High School in Forest City, North Carolina. As a junior, he tallied 50 tackles (29 for loss) and 14.0 sacks.

As a senior, he made 15 sacks, one interception and 5 forced fumbles. He played in the Shrine Bowl and the U.S. Army All-American Bowl. He also lettered in basketball, averaging over 21 points and 10 rebounds per game as a junior.

== College career ==
Watkins accepted football scholarship from Clemson University. As a true freshman in 2012, he played in nine games, recording 16 tackles (one for loss) and 3 quarterback pressures.

As a sophomore in 2013, he played in three games with one start, before being involved in a car crash which caused blood clots in both of his legs that ended his season. Watkins medically redshirted the rest of the season. He totaled 11 tackles (1.5 tackles for loss) and one quarterback pressure.

Watkins returned to play as a redshirt sophomore in 2014. He appeared in 11 games a backup, registering 13 tackles (2 for loss) and four quarterback pressures.

As a junior in 2015, he started 14 of 15 games, collecting 69 tackles (8 for loss), 3.5 sacks, and an interception, which he returned for a touchdown. He was named first-team All-Atlantic Coast Conference. In a critical game against the University of Notre Dame, he made a game-winning tackle on a last second two-point conversion attempt.

As a senior in 2016, he posted 82 tackles, 13.5 tackles for loss (led the team) and set the school record for defensive tackles with 10.5 sacks (led the team). He received All-Atlantic Coast Conference honors for the second consecutive year. On January 9, 2017, Watkins was part of the Clemson team that defeated Alabama in the 2017 College Football Playoff National Championship by a score of 35–31, with him making six total tackles. He finished his college career with 30 starts in 53 games, 191 tackles (26 for loss) and 14 sacks.

== Professional career ==
Pre-draft measurables
Height	Weight	Arm length	Hand span	Wingspan	40-yard dash	10-yard split	20-yard split	20-yard shuttle	Three-cone drill	Vertical jump	Broad jump	Bench press
6 ft 3 1/4 in (1.91 m)	309 lb (140 kg)	34 5/8 in (0.88 m)	10 3/8 in (0.26 m)	6 ft 10 3/4 in (2.10 m)	5.01 s	1.77 s	2.95 s	4.88 s	7.97 s	28.0 in (0.71 m)	9 ft 0 in (2.74 m)	25 reps
All values from NFL Combine/Pro Day

=== Houston Texans ===
Watkins was selected by the Houston Texans in the fourth round (142nd overall) of the 2017 NFL draft. The Texans acquired the pick by trading Brock Osweiler to the Cleveland Browns. As a rookie, he appeared in 12 games with 6 starts, playing defensive end in a 3-4 defense. He made 21 tackles (3 for loss) and one pass defensed.

In 2018, he appeared in 4 games and was declared inactive in 11 contests. He did not play in the seventh game against the Jacksonville Jaguars. He tallied 3 tackles (one for loss), one quarterback hit, and one sack. In the season finale against the Jaguars, he had 3 tackles (one for loss), one sack and one quarterback hit.

In 2019, he appeared in 10 games with one start, posting 23 tackles (one for loss), one sack, 2 quarterback hits, one pass defensed and one fumble recovery. He started and had 6 tackles (three solo) in the season finale against the Tennessee Titans.

In 2020, he appeared in 16 games with 11 starts, collecting 27 tackles (4 for loss), 2 sacks and 2 quarterback hits.

=== Dallas Cowboys (first stint) ===
On March 22, 2021, Watkins signed with the Dallas Cowboys, to play as a defensive tackle in a 4-3 defense. He appeared in 15 games with a career-high 14 starts, while making 32 tackles (4 for loss), one sack, one interception and one pass breakup. He missed the third game against the Philadelphia Eagles with a sprained knee. On December 2, 2021, Watkins intercepted a pass from New Orleans Saints quarterback Taysom Hill and returned it 29 yards for his first NFL touchdown.

On March 22, 2022, Watkins re-signed with the Cowboys on a one-year contract. He was released on August 30, 2022, and signed to the practice squad the next day. He was promoted to the active roster on October 22. He appeared in 12 games with 4 starts, collecting 30 tackles and one forced fumble. His starts came after Johnathan Hankins was placed on injured reserve with a pectoral injury.

=== Arizona Cardinals ===
On March 30, 2023, Watkins signed with the Arizona Cardinals. He suffered a biceps injury in Week 2 and was placed on injured reserve on September 23. He appeared in 2 games with one start, collecting 7 tackles (one for loss), one sack and one pass defensed.

=== Los Angeles Rams ===
On August 14, 2024, Watkins signed with the Los Angeles Rams. He was released on August 25.

=== Washington Commanders ===
Watkins signed with the Washington Commanders' practice squad on August 28, 2024. He appeared in one game.

=== Dallas Cowboys (second stint) ===
On September 18, 2024, the Cowboys signed Watkins to their active roster off the Commanders' practice squad. In Week 10 against the Philadelphia Eagles, he made 4 tackles. He appeared in 15 games and had 12 tackles.

=== Tennessee Titans ===
On May 13, 2025, Watkins signed with the Tennessee Titans. He was released on August 26 as part of final roster cuts and re-signed to the practice squad the next day.
