= Corn Elder =

American football player (born 1994)

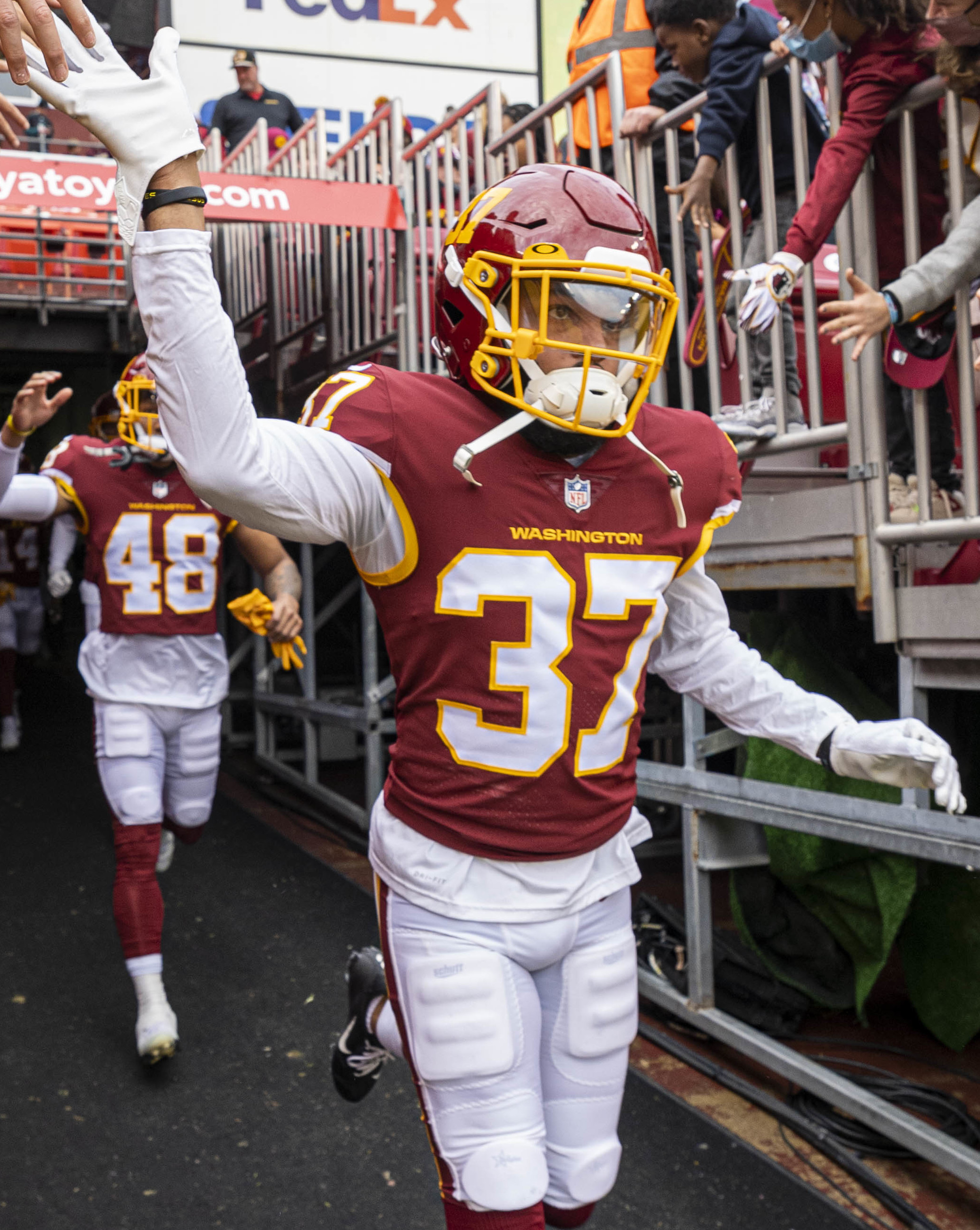
- Elder with the Washington Football Team in 2022

Profile
- Position: Cornerback

Personal information
- Born: October 9, 1994 (age 32); Murfreesboro, Tennessee, U.S.
- Listed height: 5 ft 10 in (1.78 m)
- Listed weight: 185 lb (84 kg)

Career information
- High school: The Ensworth School (Nashville, Tennessee)
- College: Miami (FL)
- NFL draft: 2017: 5th round, 152nd overall pick

Career history
- Carolina Panthers (2017–2018); New York Giants (2019)*; Carolina Panthers (2019–2020); Detroit Lions (2021)*; Carolina Panthers (2021)*; Washington Football Team / Commanders (2021–2022); Houston Roughnecks (2024–2025)
- * Offseason or practice squad member only

Awards and highlights
- Second-team All-ACC (2016)

Career NFL statistics
- Total tackles: 48
- Forced fumbles: 1
- Pass deflections: 4
- Stats at Pro Football Reference

Cornelius Marquis Elder (born October 9, 1994) is an American professional football cornerback. He played college football at Miami and was selected by the Carolina Panthers in the fifth round of the 2017 NFL draft. Elder has also been a member of the New York Giants, Detroit Lions, and Washington Football Team.

== Early life ==
Elder was a four-star running back coming out of high school and was a back to back Mr. Football Player of the Year in Tennessee. He was a two-sport star in high school and had a basketball offer from Purdue University. When he first arrived at the University of Miami, he joined the basketball team. After a torn meniscus in his right knee, he decided to focus solely on football. While playing football at Miami in 2015, he was the player who took the Hurricanes' eighth lateral of a final kickoff return in for a touchdown, resulting in a win for Miami in the last second of the game.

== Professional career ==
Pre-draft measurables
Height	Weight	Arm length	Hand span	40-yard dash	10-yard split	20-yard split	Vertical jump	Broad jump
5 ft 9 7/8 in (1.77 m)	183 lb (83 kg)	31 1/4 in (0.79 m)	8 3/4 in (0.22 m)	4.49 s	1.60 s	2.60 s	35 in (0.89 m)	9 ft 8 in (2.95 m)
All values from NFL Combine/Pro Day

=== Carolina Panthers (first stint) ===
Elder was selected by the Carolina Panthers in the fifth round, 152nd overall, in the 2017 NFL draft. On September 3, 2017, he was placed on injured reserve due to a knee injury.

Elder was waived during final roster cuts on August 30, 2019.

=== New York Giants ===
On September 2, 2019, Elder was signed to the practice squad of the New York Giants.

=== Carolina Panthers (second stint) ===
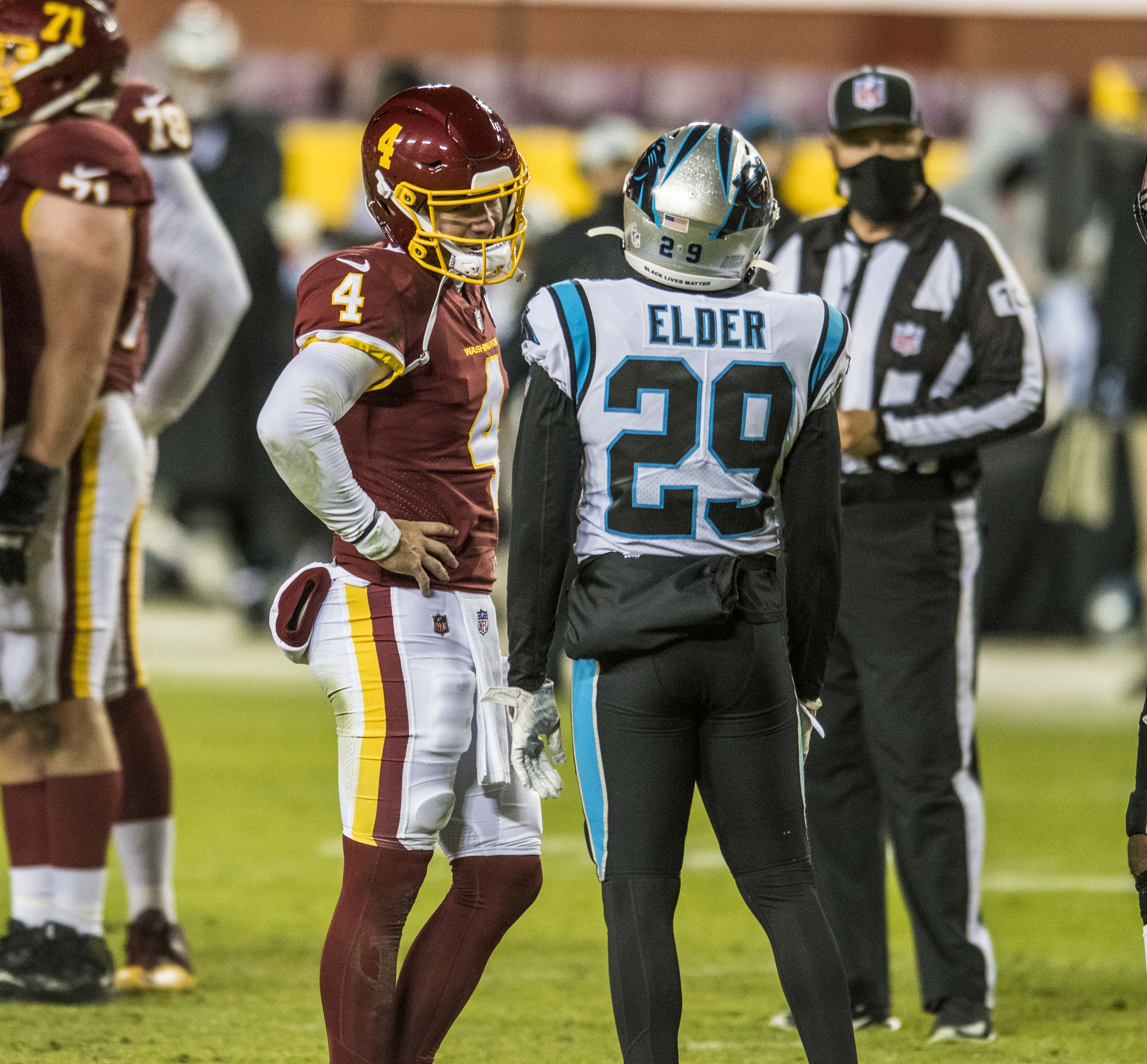
Elder playing for the Panthers in 2020

On November 12, 2019, Elder was signed by the Panthers off the Giants' practice squad.

=== Detroit Lions ===
Elder signed with the Detroit Lions on April 1, 2021. He was released on August 31, 2021.

=== Carolina Panthers (third stint) ===
On September 14, 2021, Elder was signed to the Panthers' practice squad.

=== Washington Football Team / Commanders ===
Elder was signed off the Panthers' practice squad by the Washington Football Team on October 13, 2021. He re-signed on January 11, 2022.

On August 30, 2022, Elder was waived by the Commanders and signed to the practice squad the next day.

=== Houston Roughnecks / Gamblers ===
On March 6, 2024, Elder was signed by the Houston Roughnecks of the United Football League (UFL). He re-signed with the team on August 27, 2024.

== Coaching career ==
He is also currently an assistant varsity football and basketball coach at his alma mater, The Ensworth School in Nashville, TN.
