= Dorian Johnson =

American football player (born 1994)

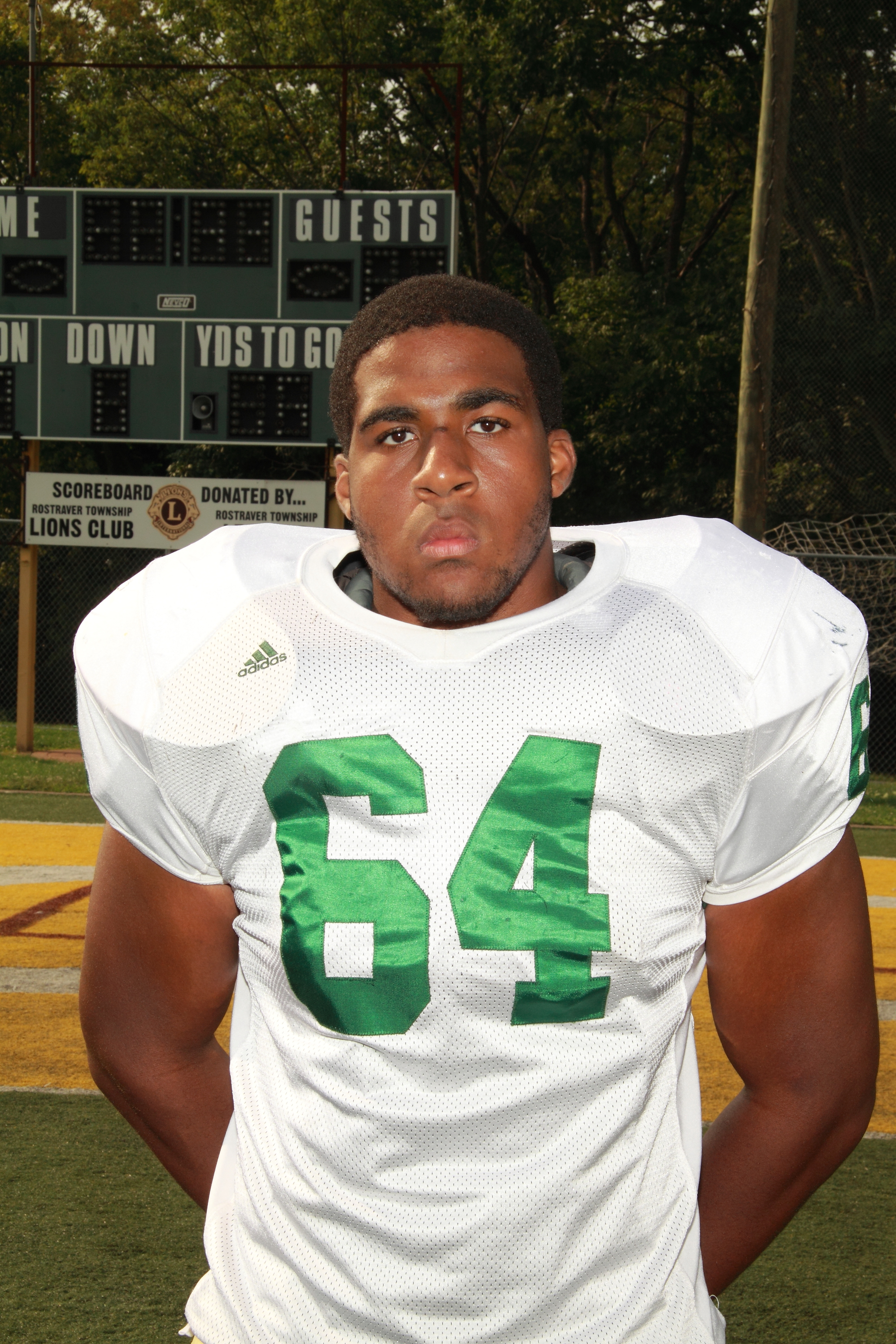
- Johnson as a Belle Vernon Area Leopard

No. 64
- Position: Guard

Personal information
- Born: October 21, 1994 (age 32); Belle Vernon, Pennsylvania, U.S.
- Listed height: 6 ft 5 in (1.96 m)
- Listed weight: 315 lb (143 kg)

Career information
- High school: Belle Vernon Area
- College: Pittsburgh
- NFL draft: 2017: 4th round, 115th overall pick

Career history
- Arizona Cardinals (2017)*; Houston Texans (2017); Carolina Panthers (2017–2018); DC Defenders (2020)
- * Offseason or practice squad member only

Awards and highlights
- First-team All-American (2016); First-team All-ACC (2016); Second-team All-ACC (2015)
- Stats at Pro Football Reference

Dorian Leon Johnson (born October 21, 1994) is an American former professional football player who was a guard in the National Football League (NFL). He played college football for the Pittsburgh Panthers.

== Early life ==
A native of Belle Vernon, Pennsylvania, Johnson attended Belle Vernon Area High School where he was a four-year varsity player and three-year starter on both the offensive and defensive line. In his junior and senior year he earned consecutive first-team All-Big Nine Conference honors.

Regarded as a four-star recruit by ESPN, Johnson was ranked as the No. 2 offensive tackle behind Laremy Tunsil. With offers from many college football programs, Johnson committed to his home-town Pittsburgh Panthers.

== College career ==
Johnson was a four-year starter at Pittsburgh. Dorian Johnson earned First-team All-American and First-team All-Atlantic Coast Conference in 2016.

== Professional career ==
=== Arizona Cardinals ===
Johnson was selected by the Cardinals in the fourth round of the 2017 NFL draft. He signed a 4-year deal with a $656,388 signing bonus on May 19, 2017. On September 2, 2017, he was waived by the Cardinals and was signed to the practice squad the next day.

=== Houston Texans ===
On October 11, 2017, Johnson was signed by the Houston Texans off the Cardinals' practice squad. He was waived by the Texans on November 3, 2017 when the Texans brought in a quarterback after an injury to Deshaun Watson and was re-signed to the practice squad. He was granted release on December 27, 2017 for a family emergency.

=== Carolina Panthers ===
On January 2, 2018, Johnson was signed to the Carolina Panthers' practice squad. He signed a reserve/future contract with the Panthers on January 8, 2018.

On September 1, 2018, Johnson was waived by the Panthers and signed to practice squad the following day. He was promoted to the active roster on December 28, 2018.

On August 1, 2019, Johnson was waived/injured by the Panthers and placed on injured reserve. He was released on August 20.

=== DC Defenders ===
On November 22, 2019, Johnson was drafted by the DC Defenders of the XFL in the 2020 XFL Supplemental Draft. He was waived after week 3 of the regular season in February 2020.
