= Elijah Hood =

American football player (born 1996)

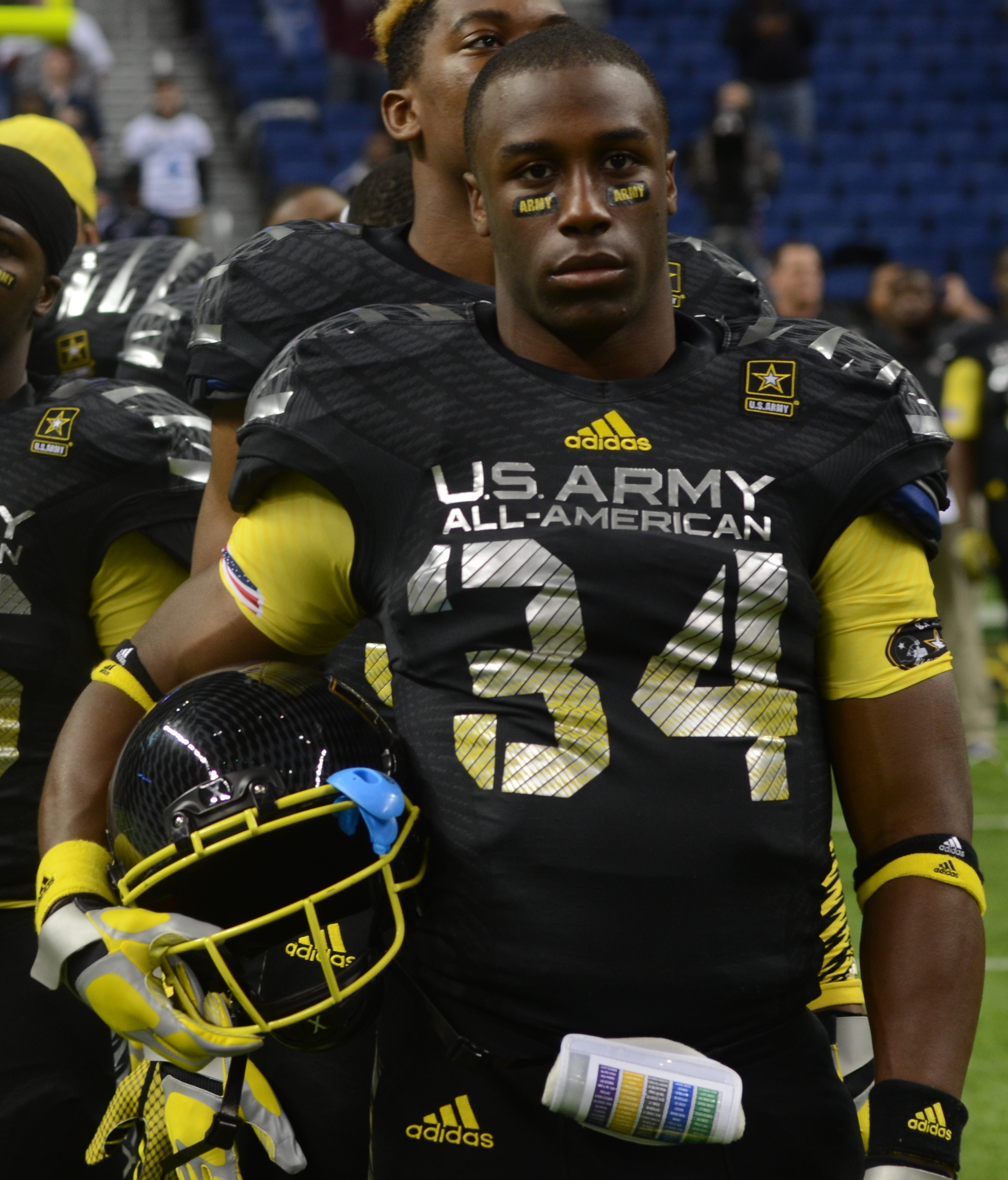
- Hood at the 2014 U.S. Army All-American Bowl

No. 34, 30, 35
- Position: Running back

Personal information
- Born: April 22, 1996 (age 30); Charlotte, North Carolina, U.S.
- Listed height: 5 ft 11 in (1.80 m)
- Listed weight: 232 lb (105 kg)

Career information
- High school: Charlotte Catholic
- College: North Carolina (2014–2016)
- NFL draft: 2017: 7th round, 242nd overall pick

Career history
- Oakland Raiders (2017); Carolina Panthers (2018); Jacksonville Jaguars (2019)*; Los Angeles Wildcats (2020)
- * Offseason or practice squad member only

Awards and highlights
- First-team All-ACC (2015); Third-team All-ACC (2016)

Career NFL statistics
- Games played: 1
- Stats at Pro Football Reference

Elijah Malik Hood (born April 22, 1996) is an American former professional football player who was a running back in the National Football League (NFL). He played college football for the North Carolina Tar Heels.

== Early life ==
Hood attended Charlotte Catholic High School in Charlotte, North Carolina, where he played high school football and became an Eagle Scout. As a senior, he won the Hall Trophy as the U.S. Army Player of the Year. During his senior season, he rushed for 3,690 yards and 53 touchdowns. He finished his high school career with 8,981 yards and 147 touchdowns. He was ranked by Rivals as the fourth best running back recruit in his class. He originally committed to the University of Notre Dame but later chose to attend the University of North Carolina at Chapel Hill.

== Professional career ==
Pre-draft measurables
Height	Weight	Arm length	Hand span	40-yard dash	10-yard split	20-yard split	20-yard shuttle	Three-cone drill	Vertical jump	Broad jump	Bench press
5 ft 11 3/8 in (1.81 m)	232 lb (105 kg)	30 3/8 in (0.77 m)	9 3/8 in (0.24 m)	4.57 s	1.54 s	2.63 s	4.65 s	7.12 s	31 1/2 in (0.80 m)	9 ft 5 in (2.87 m)	18 reps
All values from NFL Combine.

=== Oakland Raiders ===
Hood was selected by the Oakland Raiders in the seventh round, 242nd overall, in the 2017 NFL draft. He was the last of six North Carolina Tar Heels to be drafted that year. He was waived on September 2, 2017 and was signed to the Raiders' practice squad the next day. He was promoted to the active roster on October 25, 2017. He was waived by the Raiders on October 30, 2017 and re-signed to the practice squad. He signed a reserve/future contract with the Raiders on January 2, 2018. He was waived by the Raiders on May 7, 2018.

=== Carolina Panthers ===
On May 8, 2018, Hood was claimed off waivers by the Carolina Panthers. Due to a knee injury from a preseason game at Pittsburgh, he was placed on injured reserve on September 1, 2018.

On February 25, 2019, Hood signed a one-year contract to remain with the Panthers. He was waived on July 24, 2019.

=== Jacksonville Jaguars ===
On August 17, 2019, Hood was signed by the Jacksonville Jaguars. He was waived on August 31, 2019.

=== Los Angeles Wildcats ===
In October 2019, Hood was selected by the Los Angeles Wildcats of the XFL in the 2020 XFL draft. He had his contract terminated when the league suspended operations on April 10, 2020.
