= 2015 Atlantic Coast Conference football season =

2015 ACC football season
- League: NCAA Division I FBS (Football Bowl Subdivision)
- Sport: Football
- Duration: September 2015 to January 2016
- Teams: 14

2016 NFL Draft
- Top draft pick: Jalen Ramsey (Florida State)
- Picked by: Jacksonville Jaguars, 5th overall

Regular season
- Atlantic champions: Clemson Tigers
- Coastal champions: North Carolina Tar Heels

ACC Championship Game
- Champions: Clemson Tigers
- Finals MVP: Deshaun Watson

ACC seasons
- ← 2014 2016 →

2015 Atlantic Coast Conference football standings
	Conf.			Overall
Team	W		L	W		L
Atlantic Division
No. 2 Clemson x$^	8	–	0	14	–	1
No. 14 Florida State	6	–	2	10	–	3
Louisville	5	–	3	8	–	5
NC State	3	–	5	7	–	6
Syracuse	2	–	6	4	–	8
Wake Forest	1	–	7	3	–	9
Boston College	0	–	8	3	–	9
Coastal Division
No. 15 North Carolina x	8	–	0	11	–	3
Pittsburgh	6	–	2	8	–	5
Miami (FL)	5	–	3	8	–	5
Duke	4	–	4	8	–	5
Virginia Tech	4	–	4	7	–	6
Virginia	3	–	5	4	–	8
Georgia Tech	1	–	7	3	–	9
Championship: Clemson 45, North Carolina 37
^ – College Football Playoff participant; $ – Conference champion; x – Division champion/co-champions; Rankings from AP Poll

The 2015 Atlantic Coast Conference football season was the 63rd season of college football play for the Atlantic Coast Conference (ACC). It was played from September 2015 to January 2016. The Atlantic Coast Conference consisted of 14 members in two divisions. The Atlantic Division consisted of Boston College, Clemson, Florida State, Louisville, North Carolina State, Syracuse, and Wake Forest. The Coastal Division consisted of Duke, Georgia Tech, Miami, North Carolina, Pittsburgh, Virginia, and Virginia Tech. The division champions, Clemson and North Carolina, met on December 5 in the 2015 ACC Championship Game, in Charlotte, North Carolina at Bank of America Stadium.

== Preseason ==
=== Preseason Poll ===
The 2015 ACC Preseason Poll was announced at the ACC Football Kickoff meetings in Pinehurst, North Carolina on July 19–21. Georgia Tech was voted to win Coastal division while Clemson was voted to win the Atlantic division and the conference. Deshaun Watson of Clemson was voted the Preseason ACC Player of the Year.

==== Atlantic Division poll ====
1. Clemson – 1,032 (101 first place votes)
2. Florida State – 992 (56)
3. Louisville – 746 (1)
4. North Carolina State - 673
5. Boston College – 473
6. Syracuse – 291
7. Wake Forest – 217

==== Coastal Division poll ====
1. Georgia Tech – 991 (96)
2. Virginia Tech – 841 (44)
3. Miami – 632 (7)
4. Duke – 615 (4)
5. North Carolina – 590 (4)
6. Pittsburgh - 535 (3)
7. Virginia – 220

==== Predicted ACC Championship Game Winner ====
1. Clemson – 84
2. Florida State – 41
3. Georgia Tech - 20
4. Virginia Tech - 7
5. North Carolina - 3
6. Miami - 2
7. NC State - 1

==== Preseason ACC Player of the Year ====
1. Deshaun Watson, CLEM - 69
2. James Conner, PITT - 16
3. Justin Thomas, GT - 13
4. Jalen Ramsey, FSU - 7
5. Brad Kaaya, MIA - 7
6. Marquise Williams, UNC - 6
7. Kendall Fuller, VT - 6
8. Tyler Boyd, PITT - 3
9. Jacoby Brissett, NCST - 1

=== Preseason All Conference Teams ===
==== Offense ====
Position	Player	School
Wide receiver	Tyler Boyd	Pittsburgh
Wide receiver	Mike Williams	Clemson
Wide receiver	Artavis Scott	Clemson
Tight end	Bucky Hodges	Virginia Tech
Tackle	Roderick Johnson	Florida State
Tackle	Adam Bisnowaty	Pittsburgh
Guard	Landon Turner	North Carolina
Guard	Eric Mac Lain	Clemson
Center	Matt Skura	Duke
Quarterback	Deshaun Watson	Clemson
Running back	James Conner	Pittsburgh
Running back	Shadrach Thornton	NC State

==== Defense ====
Position	Player	School
Defensive end	Dadi Lhomme Nicolas	Virginia Tech
Defensive end	Shaq Lawson	Clemson
Defensive end	Sheldon Rankins	Louisville
Defensive tackle	Adam Gotsis	Georgia Tech
Defensive tackle	Luther Maddy	Virginia Tech
Linebacker	Terrance Smith	Florida State
Linebacker	Brandon Chubb	Wake Forest
Linebacker	James Burgess	Louisville
Cornerback	Jalen Ramsey	Florida State
Cornerback	Kendall Fuller	Virginia Tech
Safety	Jeremy Cash	Duke
Safety	Quin Blanding	Virginia

==== Specialist ====
Position	Player	School
Placekicker	Roberto Aguayo	Florida State
Punter	Alex Kinal	Wake Forest
Specialist	Ryan Switzer	North Carolina

== Coaches ==
Only one team changed head coaches for the 2015 season. Pat Narduzzi was selected as Pittsburgh's fifth head coach since 2010 following the resignation of former coach Paul Chryst. Chryst accepted the head coaching job at Wisconsin on December 17, 2014, leaving the vacancy for Pittsburgh to fill. This will be Narduzzi's first head coaching job at the collegiate level. He has, however, been regarded as one of the best assistant coaches in college football, winning the 2013 Broyles Award. He was most recently the defensive coordinator at Michigan State.

Note: Stats shown are before the beginning of the season

Team	Head coach	Years at school	Overall record	Record at school	ACC record
Boston College	Steve Addazio	3	27–23	14–12	8–8
Clemson	Dabo Swinney	8	61–26	61–26	39–14
Duke	David Cutcliffe	8	84–77	40–48	20–36
Florida State	Jimbo Fisher	5	58–11	58–11	34–6
Georgia Tech	Paul Johnson	8	166–74	58–35	37–19
Louisville	Bobby Petrino	6	92–34	50–13	5–3
Miami	Al Golden	5	55–56	28–22	16–16
North Carolina	Larry Fedora	4	55–36	21–17	13–11
NC State	Dave Doeren	3	34–18	11–14	3–13
Pittsburgh	Pat Narduzzi	1	0–0	0–0	0–0
Syracuse	Scott Shafer	3	10–15	10–15	5–11
Virginia	Mike London	6	47–43	23–38	11–29
Virginia Tech	Frank Beamer	28	273-138–4	231–115–2	65–23
Wake Forest	Dave Clawson	2	93–88	3–9	1–7

=== Al Golden Firing ===
On October 25, Miami athletic director Blake James fired head coach Al Golden, just over halfway through the season. The firing came after a 58–0 loss to Clemson, the worst loss in program history. Throughout the season, parts of the Miami fan base, and even former players, had been very vocal in calling for a head coaching change. In each home game, and even a game at Cincinnati, planes had been hired to fly banners over the stadium on gameday reading "Fire Al Golden". The tight ends coach, Larry Scott, took over interim head coaching duties for the remainder of the season.

== Rankings ==
Legend
	Improvement in ranking
	Drop in ranking
	Not ranked previous week
RV	Received votes but were not ranked in Top 25 of poll

		Pre	Wk 1	Wk 2	Wk 3	Wk 4	Wk 5	Wk 6	Wk 7	Wk 8	Wk 9	Wk 10	Wk 11	Wk 12	Wk 13	Wk 14	Final
Boston College	AP																
Boston College	C				RV												
Boston College	CFP	Not released															
Clemson	AP	12	12	11	11	12	6	5 (1)	6 (1)	3 (6)	3 (6)	1 (31)	1 (34)	1 (55)	1 (53)	1 (51)	2
Clemson	C	12	12	9	10	11	6	6	6	6 (1)	5 (2)	2 (21)	1 (28)	1 (58)	1 (52)	1 (55)	2
Clemson	CFP	Not released									1	1	1	1	1	1	
Duke	AP			RV		RV	RV	25	23	22	RV						RV
Duke	C	RV	RV	RV		RV	RV	24	21	18	RV						RV
Duke	CFP	Not released															
Florida State	AP	10	11	9	10	11	12	11	9	17	17	19	16	14	10	9	14
Florida State	C	8	8	6	7	9	8	8	9	15	15	18	16	14	9	8	14
Florida State	CFP	Not released									16	16	14	13	9	9	
Georgia Tech	AP	16	15	14	20												
Georgia Tech	C	17	16	16	20	RV											
Georgia Tech	CFP	Not released															
Louisville	AP	RV	RV														
Louisville	C	RV	RV										RV			RV	RV
Louisville	CFP	Not released															
Miami	AP				RV	RV											
Miami	C	RV	RV	RV	RV	RV											
Miami	CFP	Not released															
North Carolina	AP							RV	RV	RV	21	17	12	11	8	10	15
North Carolina	C	RV					RV	RV	RV	RV	21	17	12	11	8	11	15
North Carolina	CFP	Not released										23	17	14	10	10	
NC State	AP	RV	RV	RV	RV	RV											
NC State	C	RV	RV	RV	RV	RV											
NC State	CFP	Not released															
Pittsburgh	AP								25	23	RV		RV	RV			
Pittsburgh	C		RV	RV					RV	24	RV	RV	RV	RV		RV	
Pittsburgh	CFP	Not released															
Syracuse	AP																
Syracuse	C																
Syracuse	CFP	Not released															
Virginia	AP																
Virginia	C																
Virginia	CFP	Not released															
Virginia Tech	AP	RV		RV	RV												
Virginia Tech	C	RV			RV												
Virginia Tech	CFP	Not released															
Wake Forest	AP																
Wake Forest	C																
Wake Forest	CFP	Not released															

== Bowl Games ==
Bowl game	Date	Site	Television	Time (EST)	ACC team	Opponent	Score	Attendance
Hyundai Sun Bowl	December 26	Sun Bowl Stadium • El Paso, TX	CBS	2:00 p.m.	Miami	Washington State	WSU 14–20	41,180
New Era Pinstripe Bowl	December 26	Yankee Stadium • New York, NY	ABC	3:30 p.m.	Duke	Indiana	DUKE 44–41 (OT)	37,218
Camping World Independence Bowl	December 26	Independence Stadium • Shreveport, LA	ESPN	5:30 p.m.	Virginia Tech	Tulsa	VT 55–52	31,289
Military Bowl Presented by Northrop Grumman	December 28	Navy–Marine Corps Memorial Stadium • Annapolis, MD	ESPN	2:30 p.m.	Pittsburgh	#21 Navy	NAVY 28–44	36,352
Russell Athletic Bowl	December 29	Orlando Citrus Bowl Stadium • Orlando, FL	ESPN	5:30 p.m.	#10 North Carolina	#17 Baylor	BU 38–49	40,418
Belk Bowl	December 30	Bank of America Stadium • Charlotte, NC	ESPN	3:30 p.m.	NC State	Mississippi State	MSU 28–51	46,423
Franklin American Mortgage Music City Bowl	December 30	Nissan Stadium • Nashville, TN	ESPN	7:00 p.m.	Louisville	Texas A&M	LOU 27–21	50,478
College Football Playoff bowl games
Chick-fil-A Peach Bowl	December 31	Georgia Dome • Atlanta, GA	ESPN	12:00 p.m.	#9 Florida State	#18 Houston	HOU 24–38	71,007
Capital One Orange Bowl (CFP Semifinal)	December 31	Sun Life Stadium • Miami Gardens, FL	ESPN	4:00 p.m.	#1 Clemson	#4 Oklahoma	CLEM 37–17	67,615
CFP National Championship	January 11	University of Phoenix Stadium • Glendale, AZ	ESPN	8:00 p.m.	#1 Clemson	#2 Alabama	ALA 40–45	75,765

* Rankings based on CFP rankings

== Postseason ==
=== All-conference teams ===
The following player were selected to the All-ACC teams for 2015.

First Team

Position	Player	Class	Team
First Team Offense
QB	Deshaun Watson	So	Clemson
RB	Dalvin Cook	So	Florida State
RB	Elijah Hood	So	North Carolina
WR	Tyler Boyd	Jr	Pittsburgh
WR	Artavis Scott	So	Clemson
WR	Isaiah Ford	So	Virginia Tech
TE	Jaylen Samuels	So	NC State
T	Roderick Johnson	So	Florida State
T	Joe Thuney	Sr (redshirt)	NC State
G	Landon Turner	Sr (redshirt)	North Carolina
G	Eric Mac Lain	Sr (redshirt)	Clemson
C	Matt Skura	Sr (redshirt)	Duke
First Team Defense
DE	Ejuan Price	Sr (redshirt)	Pittsburgh
DE	Shaq Lawson	Jr	Clemson
DT	Carlos Watkins	Jr (redshirt)	Clemson
DT	Luther Maddy^	Sr (redshirt)	Virginia Tech
DT	Connor Wujciak^	Sr (redshirt)	Boston College
LB	Micah Kiser	So (redshirt)	Virginia
LB	Brandon Chubb	Sr (redshirt)	Wake Forest
LB	Keith Kelsey	Jr	Louisville
CB	Jalen Ramsey	Jr	Florida State
CB	Mackensie Alexander	So (redshirt)	Clemson
S	Jeremy Cash	Sr (redshirt)	Duke
S	Quin Blanding	So	Virginia
First Team Special Teams
PK	Roberto Aguayo	Jr (redshirt)	Florida State
P	Riley Dixon	Sr	Syracuse
SP	DeVon Edwards	Jr (redshirt)	Duke

Second Team

Position	Player	Class	Team
Second Team Offense
QB	Marquise Williams	Sr (redshirt)	North Carolina
RB	Wayne Gallman	So (redshirt)	Clemson
RB	Qadree Ollison	Fr (redshirt)	Pittsburgh
WR	Travis Rudolph	So	Florida State
WR	Canaan Severin	Sr	Virginia
WR	Mack Hollins^	Jr (redshirt)	North Carolina
WR	Kermit Whitfield^	Jr	Florida State
TE	Jordan Leggett	Jr	Clemson
T	Jon Heck	Jr (redshirt)	North Carolina
T	Adam Bisnowaty	Jr (redshirt)	Pittsburgh
G	Dorian Johnson	Jr	Pittsburgh
G	Caleb Peterson	Jr (redshirt)	North Carolina
C	Jay Guillermo	Jr (redshirt)	Clemson
Second Team Defense
DE	Mike Rose	Sr (redshirt)	NC State
DE	DeMarcus Walker	Jr	Florida State
DT	Nile Lawrence-Stample	Jr (redshirt)	Florida State
DT	DeAngelo Brown	Jr (redshirt)	Louisville
LB	Steven Daniels	Sr	Boston College
LB	Ben Boulware^	Jr	Clemson
LB	B. J. Goodson^	Sr (redshirt)	Clemson
LB	Reggie Northrup^	Sr	Florida State
CB	M. J. Stewart	So	North Carolina
CB	Artie Burns	Jr	Miami
S	Jayron Kearse	Jr	Clemson
S	Justin Simmons	Sr	Boston College
Second Team Special Teams
PK	Greg Huegel	Fr (redshirt)	Clemson
P	Alex Kinal	Sr (redshirt)	Wake Forest
SP	Ryan Switzer	Jr	North Carolina

Third Team

Position	Player	Class	Team
Third Team Offense
QB	Brad Kaaya	So	Miami
RB	Taquan Mizzell	Jr	Virginia
RB	Travon McMillian	Fr (redshirt)	Virginia Tech
WR	Stacy Coley	Jr	Miami
WR	Ryan Switzer	Jr	North Carolina
WR	Quinshad Davis	Sr	North Carolina
TE	Bucky Hodges	So (redshirt)	Virginia Tech
T	Mitch Hyatt	Fr	Clemson
T	Joe Gore	Sr (redshirt)	Clemson
G	Tyrone Crowder	So (redshirt)	Clemson
G	Kareem Are	Jr (redshirt)	Florida State
C	Lucas Crowley	Jr	North Carolina
Third Team Defense
DE	Sheldon Rankins	Sr	Louisville
DE	Ron Thompson	Jr	Syracuse
DT	Nazair Jones	Jr (redshirt)	North Carolina
DT	Derrick Nnadi^	So	Florida State
DT	Darryl Render^	Sr	Pittsburgh
LB	Shakeel Rashad	Sr	North Carolina
LB	James Burgess	Sr	Louisville
LB	Dwayne Norman	Sr	Duke
CB	Cordrea Tankersley	Jr	Clemson
CB	Des Lawrence	Jr	North Carolina
S	Jordan Whitehead	Fr	Pittsburgh
S	Derwin James	Fr	Florida State
Third Team Special Teams
PK	Ross Martin	Sr	Duke
P	Will Monday	Sr (redshirt)	Duke
SP	Brisly Estime	Jr	Syracuse

^ indicates that there was a tie in the voting

=== ACC Individual Awards ===
ACC Player of the Year

QB Deshaun Watson - Clemson

Rookie of the Year

S Jordan Whitehead - Pittsburgh

Coach of the Year

Dabo Swinney - Clemson

Offensive Player of the Year

QB Deshaun Watson - Clemson

Offensive Rookie of the Year

QB Qadree Ollison - Miami

Jacobs Blocking Trophy

T Roderick Johnson - Florida State

Defensive Player of the Year

S Jeremy Cash - Duke

Defensive Rookie of the Year

S Jordan Whitehead - Pittsburgh

=== National Awards ===
Davey O'Brien Award

QB Deshaun Watson - Clemson

Home Depot Coach of the Year Award
Walter Camp Coach of the Year Award
Associated Press College Football Coach of the Year Award

Dabo Swinney - Clemson

Pop Warner College Football Award

LB Brandon Chubb - Wake Forest
