= Devonte Fields =

American gridiron football player (born 1993)

Profile
- Position: Defensive lineman

Personal information
- Born: September 23, 1993 (age 33); Fort Worth, Texas, U.S.
- Listed height: 6 ft 4 in (1.93 m)
- Listed weight: 245 lb (111 kg)

Career information
- College: Louisville
- NFL draft: 2017: undrafted

Career history
- Edmonton Eskimos (2017)*
- * Offseason or practice squad member only

Awards and highlights
- First-team All-ACC (2016); First-team All-Big 12 (2012); Big 12 Defensive Freshman of the Year (2012)

Devonte Fields (September 23, 1993) is an American former college and professional football player. He played college football for TCU, Trinity Valley Community College, and Louisville as a linebacker.

== Early life ==
Fields attended Arlington Martin High School in Arlington, Texas. As a senior, he had 73 tackles, 13 sacks and two interceptions. He committed to Texas Christian University (TCU) to play college football.

== College career ==
As a freshman at TCU in 2012, Fields started all 13 games and had 53 tackles, 10 sacks and an interception. He was named the Big 12 Defensive Freshman of the Year. He played in only three games as a sophomore in 2013 due to injury and suspension. In August 2014 he was removed from TCU over numerous incidents that had occurred over the previous months.

Fields attended Trinity Valley Community College in 2014. He played in 12 games and had 61 tackles and 6.5 sacks. He transferred to the University of Louisville in 2015. During his first year at Louisville, Fields started all 13 games, recording 64 tackles and 11 sacks.

== Professional career ==
Fields was signed to the Edmonton Eskimos' practice squad on July 31, 2017, and was listed as a defensive lineman. He re-signed with the team on February 6, 2018. He was released on May 1, 2018.
