= Matthew Dayes =

American football player (born 1994)

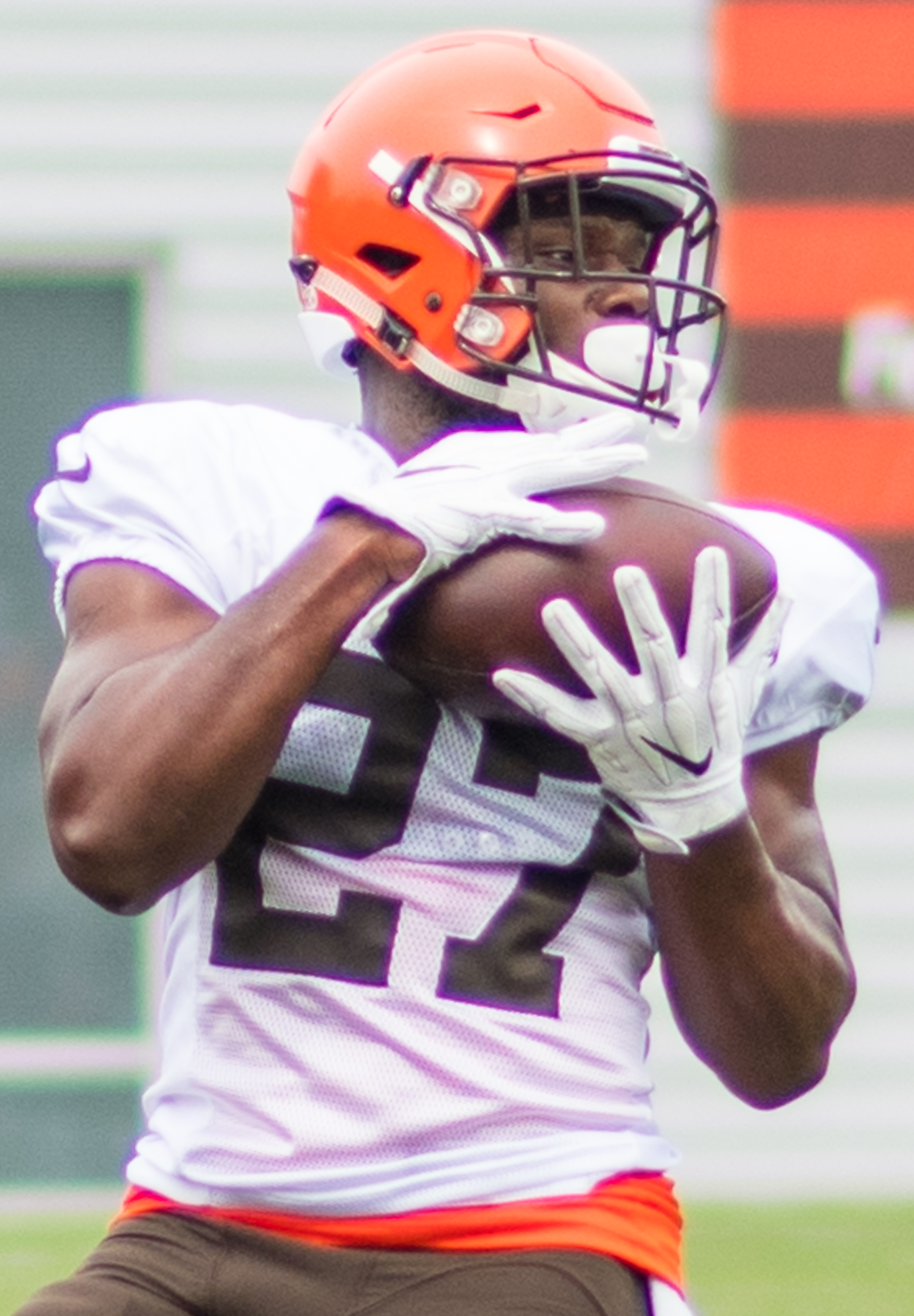
- Dayes with the Cleveland Browns in 2018

No. 27, 43
- Position: Running back

Personal information
- Born: September 3, 1994 (age 32); Fort Lauderdale, Florida, U.S.
- Listed height: 5 ft 9 in (1.75 m)
- Listed weight: 205 lb (93 kg)

Career information
- High school: Cypress Bay (Weston, Florida)
- College: NC State (2013–2016)
- NFL draft: 2017: 7th round, 252nd overall pick

Career history
- Cleveland Browns (2017); San Francisco 49ers (2018); New Orleans Saints (2019)

Awards and highlights
- Second-team All-ACC (2016)

Career NFL statistics
- Rushing yards: 13
- Receptions: 4
- Receiving yards: 29
- Return yards: 437
- Stats at Pro Football Reference

Matthew Shaun Dayes (born September 3, 1994) is an American former professional football player who was a running back in the National Football League (NFL). He played college football for the NC State Wolfpack. He was selected by the Cleveland Browns in the seventh round of the 2017 NFL draft.

== Early life ==
Dayes attended and played high school football at Cypress Bay High School.

== College career ==
Dayes attended and played college football at North Carolina State University from 2013–2016. He had a particularly strong collegiate debut against Louisiana Tech with 17 carries for 84 rushing yards and three rushing touchdowns in the 40–14 victory. Overall, in his freshman season, he had 63 carries for 252 rushing yards and four rushing touchdowns to go along with 10 receptions for 173 receiving yards and one receiving touchdown. In the 2014 season, he showed off some versatility by finishing with 104 carries for 573 rushing yards and eight rushing touchdowns to go along with 32 receptions for 321 receiving yards and five receiving touchdowns. He handled some kick return duties with 21 kick returns for 384 net yards. In the 2015 season, he had 134 carries for 865 rushing yards and two rushing touchdowns to go along with 24 receptions for 172 receiving yards. In his final collegiate season in 2016, he had 249 carries for 1,166 rushing yards and ten rushing touchdowns to go along with 32 receptions for 271 receiving yards.

=== Statistics ===
| Year | School | Class | Pos | G | Rush | Yds | Avg | TD | Rec | Yds | Avg | TD |
|---|---|---|---|---|---|---|---|---|---|---|---|---|
| 2013 | NC State | Freshman | RB | 11 | 63 | 252 | 4.0 | 4 | 10 | 173 | 17.3 | 1 |
| 2014 | NC State | Sophomore | RB | 13 | 104 | 573 | 5.5 | 8 | 32 | 321 | 10.0 | 5 |
| 2015 | NC State | Junior | RB | 8 | 134 | 865 | 6.5 | 12 | 24 | 172 | 7.2 | 0 |
| 2016 | NC State | Senior | RB | 13 | 249 | 1,166 | 4.7 | 10 | 32 | 271 | 8.5 | 0 |
| Career | | | | | 550 | 2,856 | 5.2 | 34 | 98 | 937 | 9.6 | 6 |

== Professional career ==
=== Pre-draft ===
Coming out of NC State, Dayes was projected to be selected in the fifth or sixth round by the majority of NFL draft experts and scouts. He received an invitation to the NFL Combine, but was limited to only the vertical jump, broad jump, and bench press. On March 20, 2017, he participated at NC State's Pro Day and completed all of the positional drills and required combine drills he missed at the combine. Scouts and team representatives from 22 NFL teams attended NC State's Pro Day, to scout Dayes, Jack Tocho, Josh Jones, and nine others. Dayes was ranked as the 16th-best running back prospect available in the draft by NFLDraftScout.com.

Pre-draft measurables
| Height | Weight | Arm length | Hand span | 40-yard dash | 10-yard split | 20-yard split | 20-yard shuttle | Three-cone drill | Vertical jump | Broad jump | Bench press |
|---|---|---|---|---|---|---|---|---|---|---|---|
| 5 ft 9 in (1.75 m) | 205 lb (93 kg) | 30 in (0.76 m) | 10 1/2 in (0.27 m) | 4.66 s | 1.59 s | 2.67 s | 4.51 s | 7.26 s | 28 in (0.71 m) | 9 ft 1 in (2.77 m) | 18 reps |
All values from NFL Combine/NC State Pro Day

=== Cleveland Browns ===
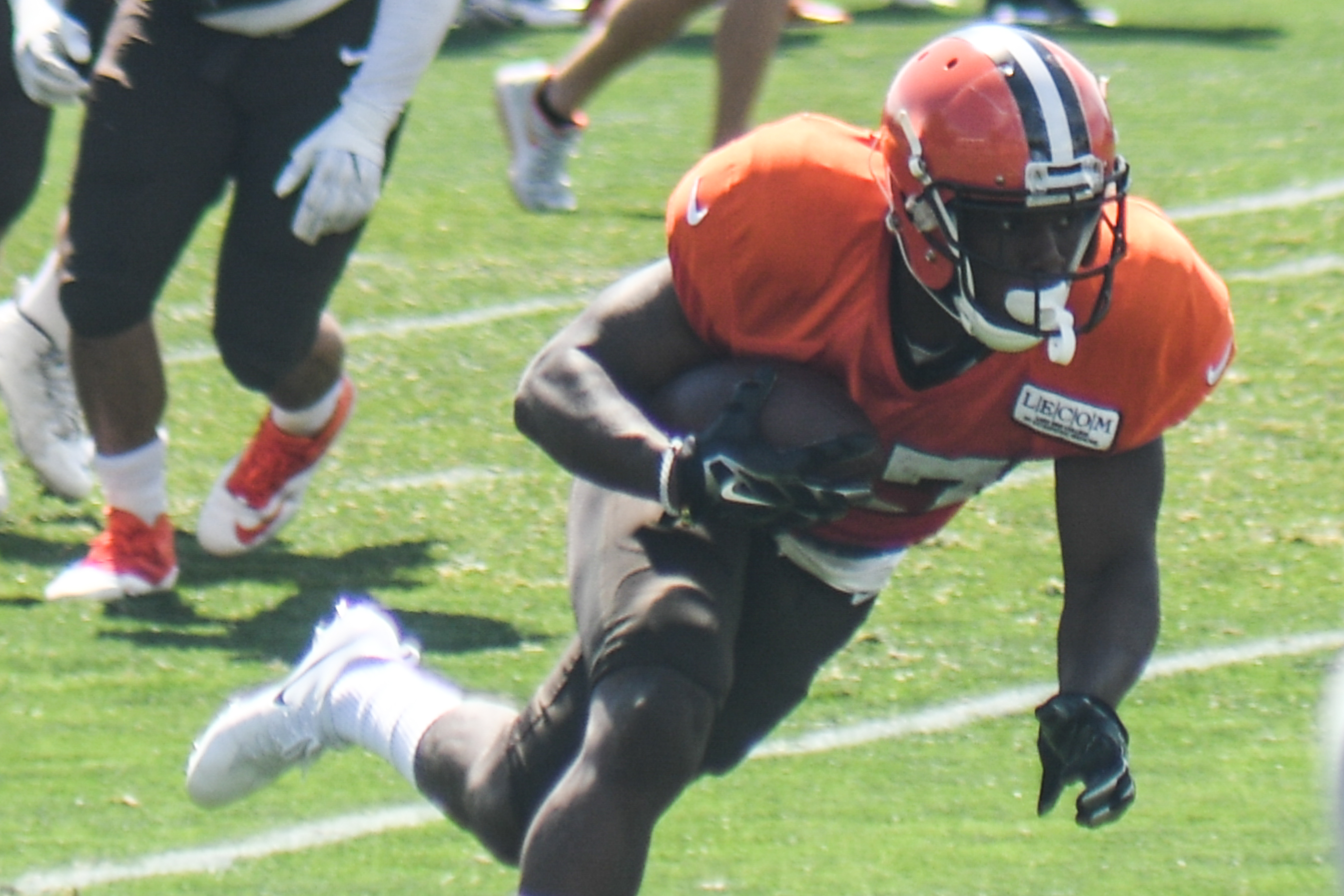
Dayes in 2017

The Cleveland Browns selected Dayes in the seventh round (252nd overall) of the 2017 NFL draft. He signed his four-year rookie contract with the Browns on May 10, 2017, a deal reportedly worth $2.46 million.

He competed with Brandon Wilds and Terrence Magee throughout training camp for the Browns' third running back job on their depth chart. Head coach Hue Jackson named Dayes as the Browns' third running back to begin the regular season, behind veterans Duke Johnson and Isaiah Crowell.

On September 10, 2017, Dayes made his regular season debut and had three carries for seven yards and two receptions for nine yards during a 21–18 loss to the Pittsburgh Steelers. Overall, he had five carries for 13 rushing yards to go along with four receptions for 29 receiving yards in his rookie season.

On September 1, 2018, Dayes was waived by the Browns.

=== San Francisco 49ers ===
On October 9, 2018, Dayes was signed to the San Francisco 49ers' practice squad. He was promoted to the active roster on November 12, 2018. He was waived on May 6, 2019.

=== New Orleans Saints ===
On May 28, 2019, Dayes signed with the New Orleans Saints. He was waived/injured on August 8 and placed on injured reserve the next day. He was waived from injured reserve on September 10.
