= Josh Jones (safety) =

American football player (born 1994)

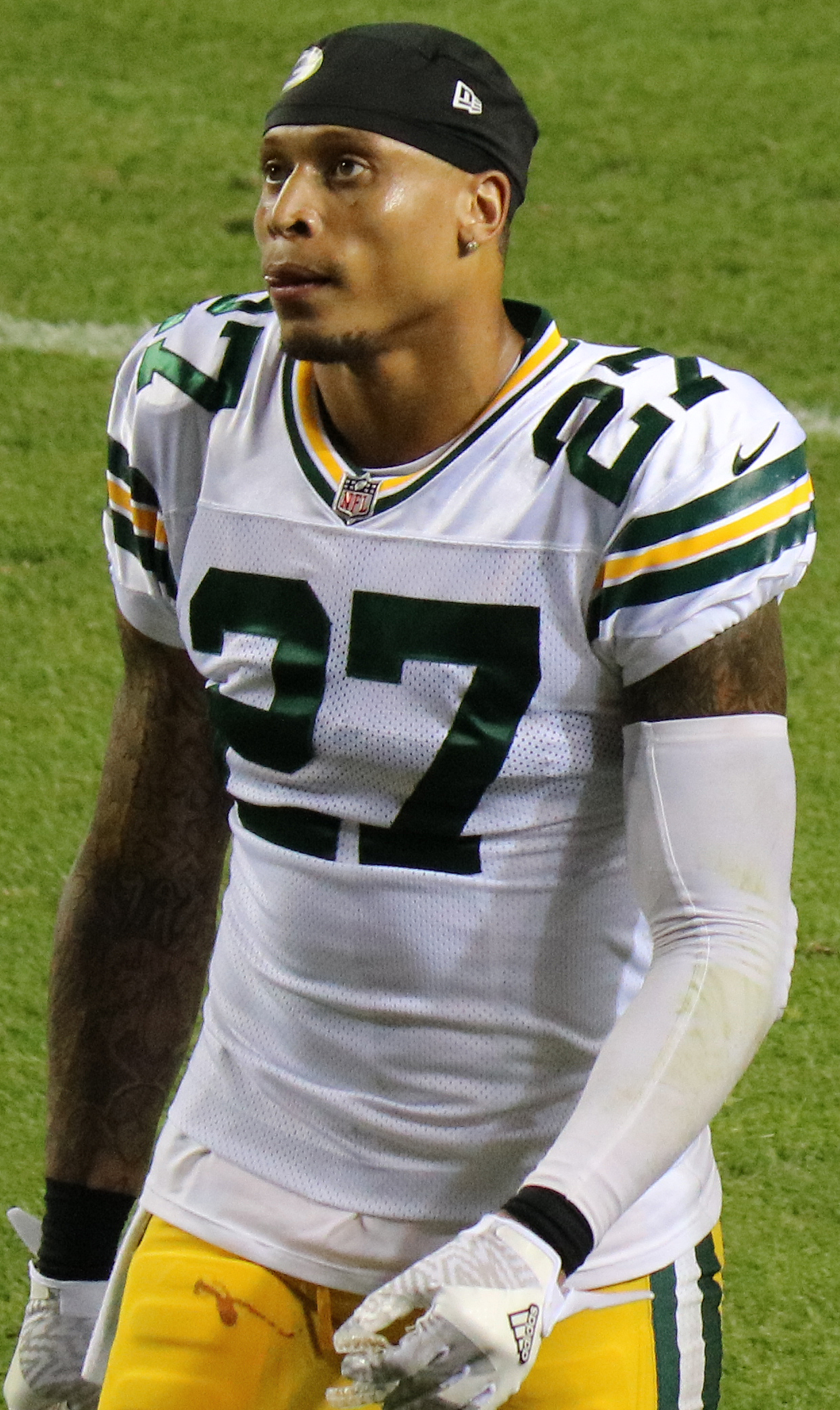
- Jones with the Green Bay Packers in 2017

No. 27, 26, 29, 36, 42, 13
- Position: Safety

Personal information
- Born: September 20, 1994 (age 32); Chicago, Illinois, U.S.
- Listed height: 6 ft 2 in (1.88 m)
- Listed weight: 220 lb (100 kg)

Career information
- High school: Southfield (Southfield, Michigan); Walled Lake Western (Walled Lake, Michigan)
- College: NC State (2013–2016)
- NFL draft: 2017: 2nd round, 61st overall pick

Career history
- Green Bay Packers (2017–2018); Dallas Cowboys (2019); Jacksonville Jaguars (2020); Indianapolis Colts (2021); Seattle Seahawks (2021–2022)

Career NFL statistics
- Total tackles: 227
- Sacks: 3.0
- Pass deflections: 9
- Interceptions: 2
- Stats at Pro Football Reference

Josh Jones (born September 20, 1994) is an American former professional football player who played safety in the National Football League (NFL). He played college football for the NC State Wolfpack, and was selected by the Green Bay Packers in the second round of the 2017 NFL draft. He also played for the Dallas Cowboys and Jacksonville Jaguars.

== Early life ==
Jones attended Southfield High School in Southfield, Michigan, for his freshman and sophomore years and then spent 11th and 12th grade at Walled Lake Western High School in Walled Lake, Michigan. He played defensive back and running back. He committed to North Carolina State University to play college football.

== College career ==
Jones played at NC State from 2013 to 2016. After redshirting in 2013, Jones saw his first action in 2014 and had 56 tackles and four interceptions. As a sophomore, he had 64 tackles and one interception. As a junior, he led the team with 109 tackles and three interceptions. Jones entered the 2017 NFL draft after his junior season.

== Professional career ==
=== Pre-draft ===
Scouts and representatives from 22 NFL teams attended North Carolina State's Pro Day to scout Jones, Matthew Dayes, Jack Tocho, and nine others. He completed the short shuttle, three-cone, and positional drills. At the NFL combine, Jones completed all the combine drills except short shuttle and three-cone. Jones attended private workouts and visits for ten different NFL teams, including the Chicago Bears, Miami Dolphins, New York Jets, Carolina Panthers, Oakland Raiders, Washington Redskins, Baltimore Ravens, Pittsburgh Steelers, Houston Texans, and Minnesota Vikings. NFL draft experts and analysts projected him to be a second round pick. He was ranked the third best strong safety prospect available in the draft by NFLDraftScout.com, the sixth best safety by ESPN, the seventh best safety by Sports Illustrated.

Pre-draft measurables
Height	Weight	Arm length	Hand span	Wingspan	40-yard dash	10-yard split	20-yard split	20-yard shuttle	Three-cone drill	Vertical jump	Broad jump	Bench press	Wonderlic
6 ft 1 3/8 in (1.86 m)	220 lb (100 kg)	32 in (0.81 m)	9 3/8 in (0.24 m)	6 ft 4 1/4 in (1.94 m)	4.41 s	1.49 s	2.61 s	4.40 s	7.05 s	37.5 in (0.95 m)	11 ft 0 in (3.35 m)	20 reps	17
All values from NFL Combine/NC State's Pro Day

=== Green Bay Packers ===
==== 2017 ====
The Green Bay Packers selected Jones in the second round, 61st overall, of the 2017 NFL Draft. Jones was the ninth safety drafted in 2017. On May 19, 2017, the Packers signed Jones to a four-year, $4.23 million contract that included a signing bonus of $1.21 million.

Jones was the backup strong safety to starter Morgan Burnett throughout training camp and to begin the regular season. He made his professional regular season debut in the season opener against the Seattle Seahawks and made one solo tackle during Green Bay's 17–9 victory. On September 24, 2017, Jones earned his first career start and collected a season-high 12 combined tackles (11 solo) while twice sacking Cincinnati Bengals quarterback Andy Dalton during a 27–24 overtime victory. On December 10, 2017, Jones had one solo tackle, a season-high three pass deflections, his first career interception during a 27–21 victory against the Cleveland Browns in Week 14. He finished his rookie season in with 71 combined tackles (60 solo), five pass deflections, two sacks, and one interception in 16 games and seven starts.

==== 2018 ====
Jones entered training camp slated as the starting strong safety after the role was left vacant by the departure of Burnett during free agency. Jones saw competition for the role from Kentrell Brice. Head coach Mike McCarthy named Jones the backup strong safety, behind Kentrell Brice, to begin the regular season.

Jones was inactive for the first three games (Weeks 1–3) after sustaining an ankle injury during practice. On December 2, 2018, the Packers fired McCarthy after they fell to a 4–7–1 record. Jones became the starting strong safety in Week 14 and held the position for the remainder of the season. In Week 16, he collected a season-high 12 combined tackles (six solo) and deflected a pass during a 44–38 win at the New York Jets. He finished the season with 56 combined tackles (40 solo), two pass deflections, and one sack in 13 games and five starts.

Jones was waived with a non-football illness designation on August 25, 2019.

=== Dallas Cowboys ===
On October 2, 2019, Jones was signed to the practice squad of the Dallas Cowboys. He was promoted to the active roster on November 16, 2019. He was waived on December 28, 2019.

=== Jacksonville Jaguars ===
On December 31, 2019, Jones was claimed off waivers by the Jacksonville Jaguars.

Jones was named the Jaguars starting strong safety to begin the 2020 season. In Week 5 of the 2020 season against the Houston Texans, Jones was ejected after initiating a helmet to helmet hit on wide receiver Brandin Cooks. He was placed on injured reserve on November 14, 2020, with a chest injury. He was activated on December 5, 2020. In Week 15 against the Baltimore Ravens, Jones recorded his first interception as a Jaguar off a pass thrown by Lamar Jackson during the 40–14 loss.

Jones re-signed with the Jaguars on March 29, 2021. He was released on August 31, 2021.

=== Indianapolis Colts ===
On October 20, 2021, Jones was signed to the Indianapolis Colts practice squad. He was promoted to the active roster on November 1. He was waived on December 4.

=== Seattle Seahawks ===
On December 15, 2021, Jones was signed to the Seattle Seahawks practice squad. He re-signed with the team on May 3, 2022. He made the Seahawks roster as the third safety behind Quandre Diggs and Ryan Neal. He suffered a hamstring injury in Week 13 and was placed on injured reserve on December 6, 2022.

== NFL career statistics ==
Regular season statistics
Season	Team	Games		Tackles				
Season	Team	GP	GS	Total	Solo	Ast	Sck	Int
2017	GB	16	7	71	60	11	2.0	1
2018	GB	13	5	55	40	15	1.0	0
2019	DAL	6	0	2	1	1	0.0	0
	Total	35	12	128	101	27	3.0	1
Source: NFL.com
