= 2018 Florida State Seminoles football team =

American college football season

2018 Florida State Seminoles football
- Conference: Atlantic Coast Conference
- Atlantic Division
- Record: 5–7 (3–5 ACC)
- Head coach: Willie Taggart (1st season)
- Offensive coordinator: Walt Bell (1st season)
- Offensive scheme: Gulf Coast
- Defensive coordinator: Harlon Barnett (1st season)
- Base defense: Multiple
- Captains: Ricky Aguayo; Alec Eberle; Brian Burns
- Home stadium: Doak Campbell Stadium

Uniform
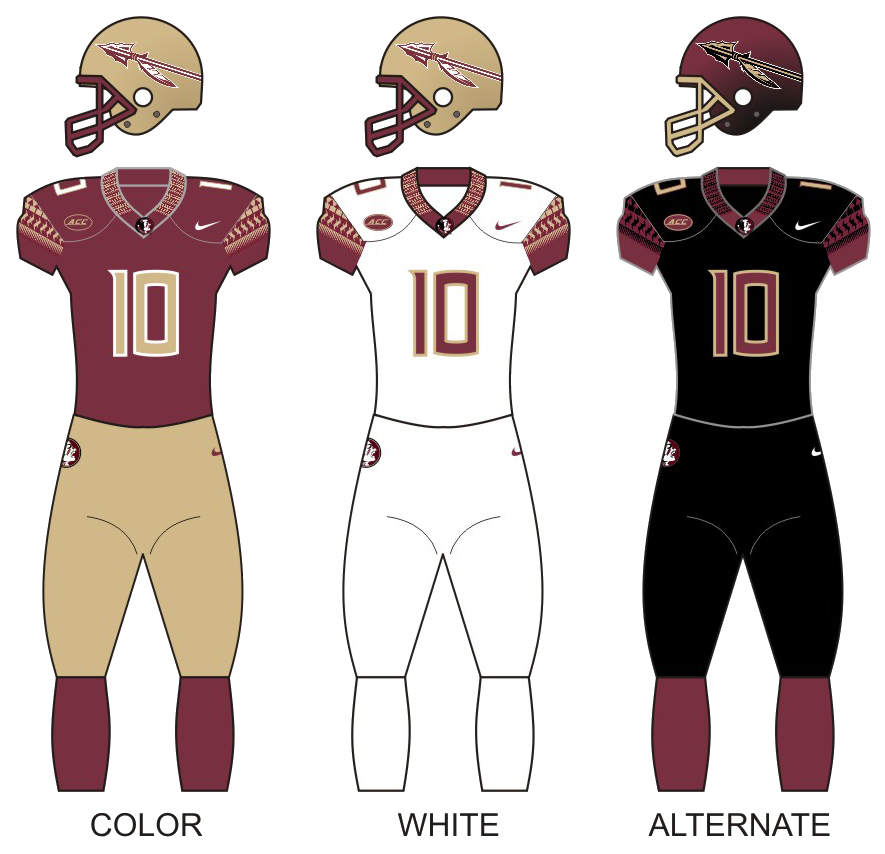

2018 Atlantic Coast Conference football standings
	Conf.			Overall
Team	W		L	W		L
Atlantic Division
No. 1 Clemson x$#^	8	–	0	15	–	0
No. 15 Syracuse	6	–	2	10	–	3
NC State	5	–	3	9	–	4
Boston College	4	–	4	7	–	5
Wake Forest	3	–	5	7	–	6
Florida State	3	–	5	5	–	7
Louisville	0	–	8	2	–	10
Coastal Division
Pittsburgh x	6	–	2	7	–	7
Georgia Tech	5	–	3	7	–	6
Miami (FL)	4	–	4	7	–	6
Virginia	4	–	4	8	–	5
Virginia Tech	4	–	4	6	–	7
Duke	3	–	5	8	–	5
North Carolina	1	–	7	2	–	9
Championship: Clemson 42, Pittsburgh 10
# – College Football Playoff champion; ^ – College Football Playoff participant; $ – Conference champion; x – Division champion/co-champions; Rankings from AP Poll

The 2018 Florida State Seminoles football team represented Florida State University during the 2018 NCAA Division I FBS football season. The Seminoles were led by first-year head coach Willie Taggart and played their home games at Doak Campbell Stadium. They competed as members of the Atlantic Division of the Atlantic Coast Conference.

The Seminoles finished the season with a losing record for the first time since 1976, missing a bowl game for the first time since 1981. Linebacker Brian Burns went on to be selected in the first round of the NFL draft, with defensive tackle Demarcus Christmas being selected in the sixth round.

== Recruiting ==
Position key

Back	B	Center	C	Cornerback	CB	Defensive back	DB
Defensive end	DE	Defensive lineman	DL	Defensive tackle	DT	End	E
Fullback	FB	Guard	G	Halfback	HB	Kicker	K
Kickoff returner	KR	Offensive tackle	OT	Offensive lineman	OL	Linebacker	LB
Long snapper	LS	Punter	P	Punt returner	PR	Quarterback	QB
Running back	RB	Safety	S	Tight end	TE	Wide receiver	WR

The Seminoles signed a total of 21 recruits.

College recruiting (2018)
Name	Hometown	School	Height	Weight	Commit date
Robert Cooper; DT	Snellville, GA	South Gwinnett High School	6 ft 2 in (1.88 m)	377 lb (171 kg)	Jun 16, 2016
Robert Cooper; DT	Recruit ratings: Scout: Rivals: 247Sports: ESPN:				
Christian Meadows; OG	Montezuma, GA	Macon County High School	6 ft 3 in (1.91 m)	330 lb (150 kg)	Jul 29, 2016
Christian Meadows; OG	Recruit ratings: Scout: Rivals: 247Sports: ESPN:				
Asante Samuel Jr. CB	Fort Lauderdale, FL	St. Thomas Aquinas High School	5 ft 10 in (1.78 m)	164 lb (74 kg)	Apr 13, 2017
Asante Samuel Jr. CB	Recruit ratings: Scout: Rivals: 247Sports: ESPN:				
Anthony Lytton; CB	Upper Marlboro, MD	Dr. Henry A. Wise Jr. High School	5 ft 10 in (1.78 m)	173 lb (78 kg)	Apr 27, 2017
Anthony Lytton; CB	Recruit ratings: Scout: Rivals: 247Sports: ESPN:				
Amari Gainer; LB	Tallahassee, FL	Lawton Chiles High School	6 ft 4 in (1.93 m)	194 lb (88 kg)	May 26, 2017
Amari Gainer; LB	Recruit ratings: Scout: Rivals: 247Sports: ESPN:				
D'Marcus Adams; WR	Daytona Beach, FL	Mainland High School	6 ft 0 in (1.83 m)	170 lb (77 kg)	Jun 14, 2017
D'Marcus Adams; WR	Recruit ratings: Scout: Rivals: 247Sports: ESPN:				
Christian Armstrong; OT	Warner Robins, GA	Warner Robins High School	6 ft 5 in (1.96 m)	335 lb (152 kg)	Jun 25, 2017
Christian Armstrong; OT	Recruit ratings: Scout: Rivals: 247Sports: ESPN:				
Chaz Neal; DE	Wesley Chapel, FL	Wesley Chapel High School	6 ft 7 in (2.01 m)	253 lb (115 kg)	Jul 20, 2017
Chaz Neal; DE	Recruit ratings: Scout: Rivals: 247Sports: ESPN:				
Jaiden Woodbey; S	Bellflower, CA	St. John Bosco High School	6 ft 2 in (1.88 m)	204 lb (93 kg)	Dec 20, 2017
Jaiden Woodbey; S	Recruit ratings: Scout: Rivals: 247Sports: ESPN:				
Isaiah Bolden; CB	Tampa, FL	Wesley Chapel High School	6 ft 2 in (1.88 m)	175 lb (79 kg)	Dec 22, 2017
Isaiah Bolden; CB	Recruit ratings: Scout: Rivals: 247Sports: ESPN:				
Camren McDonald; TE	Long Beach, CA	Poly High School	6 ft 4 in (1.93 m)	220 lb (100 kg)	Jan 13, 2018
Camren McDonald; TE	Recruit ratings: Scout: Rivals: 247Sports: ESPN:				
Jalen Goss; OT	Valdosta, GA	Lowndes High School	6 ft 7 in (2.01 m)	265 lb (120 kg)	Jan 15, 2018
Jalen Goss; OT	Recruit ratings: Scout: Rivals: 247Sports: ESPN:				
Xavier Peters; LB	West Chester, OH	Lakota West High School	6 ft 4 in (1.93 m)	225 lb (102 kg)	Jan 28, 2018
Xavier Peters; LB	Recruit ratings: Scout: Rivals: 247Sports: ESPN:				
Dennis Briggs; DE	Kissimmee, FL	Gateway High School	6 ft 4 in (1.93 m)	252 lb (114 kg)	Jan 28, 2018
Dennis Briggs; DE	Recruit ratings: Scout: Rivals: 247Sports: ESPN:				
Warren Thompson; WR	Seffner, FL	Armwood High School	6 ft 3 in (1.91 m)	200 lb (91 kg)	Jan 31, 2018
Warren Thompson; WR	Recruit ratings: Scout: Rivals: 247Sports: ESPN:				
Keyshawn Helton; WR	Pensacola, FL	West Florida Tech High School	5 ft 9 in (1.75 m)	160 lb (73 kg)	Feb 4, 2018
Keyshawn Helton; WR	Recruit ratings: Scout: Rivals: 247Sports: ESPN:				
Anthony Grant; RB	Buford, GA	Buford High School	5 ft 11 in (1.80 m)	200 lb (91 kg)	Feb 7, 2018
Anthony Grant; RB	Recruit ratings: Scout: Rivals: 247Sports: ESPN:				
Malcolm Lamar; DE	Seffner, FL	Armwood High School	6 ft 5 in (1.96 m)	250 lb (110 kg)	Feb 7, 2018
Malcolm Lamar; DE	Recruit ratings: Scout: Rivals: 247Sports: ESPN:				
Jamarcus Chatman; DT	Rome, GA	Rome High School	6 ft 3 in (1.91 m)	266 lb (121 kg)	Feb 7, 2018
Jamarcus Chatman; DT	Recruit ratings: Scout: Rivals: 247Sports: ESPN:				
Tre'Shaun Harrison; WR	Seattle, WA	Garfield High School	6 ft 2 in (1.88 m)	190 lb (86 kg)	Feb 7, 2018
Tre'Shaun Harrison; WR	Recruit ratings: Scout: Rivals: 247Sports: ESPN:				
Jordan Young; WR	Conyers, GA	Heritage High School	6 ft 2 in (1.88 m)	185 lb (84 kg)	Feb 7, 2018
Jordan Young; WR	Recruit ratings: Scout: Rivals: 247Sports: ESPN:				
Overall recruit ranking:
Note: In many cases, Scout, Rivals, 247Sports, On3, and ESPN may conflict in their listings of height and weight.; In these cases, the average was taken. ESPN grades are on a 100-point scale.; Sources: "FSU Football Commitments". Rivals.; "2018 Team Ranking". Rivals.com.

== Preseason ==
=== Award watch lists ===
Award	Player	Position	Year
Rimington Trophy	Alec Eberle	C	SR
Chuck Bednarik Award	Brian Burns	DE	JR
Maxwell Award	Deondre Francois	QB	JR
Maxwell Award	Cam Akers	RB	SO
Doak Walker Award	Cam Akers	RB	SO
Doak Walker Award	Jacques Patrick	RB	SR
Outland Trophy	Alec Eberle	C	SR
Lou Groza Award	Ricky Aguayo	K	JR
Ray Guy Award	Logan Tyler	P	JR
Wuerffel Trophy	Alec Eberle	C	SR
Walter Camp Award	Cam Akers	RB	SO
Ted Hendricks Award	Brian Burns	DE	JR

=== ACC media poll ===
In the preseason ACC media poll, Florida State was selected to finish second in the Atlantic division.

Media poll (Atlantic)
Predicted finish	Team	Votes (1st place)
1	Clemson	1,031 (145)
2	Florida State	789 (1)
3	NC State	712 (2)
4	Boston College	545
5	Louisville	422
6	Wake Forest	413
7	Syracuse	232

=== Preseason All-ACC teams ===
The Seminoles had two players selected to the preseason All-ACC teams, with one offensive selection and one on special teams.

- Cam Akers
- Ricky Aguayo

== Schedule ==
Date	Time	Opponent	Rank	Site	TV	Result	Attendance
September 3	8:00 p.m.	No. 20 Virginia Tech	No. 19	Doak Campbell Stadium; Tallahassee, FL	ESPN	L 3–24	79,560
September 8	7:20 p.m.	No. 9 (FCS) Samford*		Doak Campbell Stadium; Tallahassee, FL	ACCN	W 36–26	72,239
September 15	12:00 p.m.	at Syracuse		Carrier Dome; Syracuse, NY	ESPN	L 7–30	37,457
September 22	3:30 p.m.	Northern Illinois*		Doak Campbell Stadium; Tallahassee, FL	ESPNU	W 37–19	65,633
September 29	3:30 p.m.	at Louisville		Cardinal Stadium; Louisville, KY	ESPN2	W 28–24	52,798
October 6	3:30 p.m.	at No. 17 Miami (FL)		Hard Rock Stadium; Miami Gardens, FL (rivalry)	ABC	L 27–28	65,490
October 20	3:30 p.m.	Wake Forest^{†}		Doak Campbell Stadium; Tallahassee, FL	ESPN2	W 38–17	67,274
October 27	12:00 p.m.	No. 2 Clemson		Doak Campbell Stadium; Tallahassee, FL (rivalry)	ABC	L 10–59	68,403
November 3	3:30 p.m.	at NC State		Carter–Finley Stadium; Raleigh, NC	ABC	L 28–47	57,600
November 10	7:30 p.m.	at No. 3 Notre Dame*		Notre Dame Stadium; South Bend, IN (rivalry)	NBC	L 13–42	77,622
November 17	3:30 p.m.	No. 22 Boston College		Doak Campbell Stadium; Tallahassee, FL	ESPN2	W 22–21	57,274
November 24	12:00 p.m.	No. 13 Florida*		Doak Campbell Stadium; Tallahassee, FL (rivalry)	ABC	L 14–41	71,953
*Non-conference game; ^{†}Homecoming; Rankings from AP Poll released prior to the game; All times are in Eastern time

Schedule Source:

== Coaching staff ==
Florida State Seminoles coaches

Head coach

- Willie Taggart

Assistant coaches

- Walt Bell – Offensive coordinator/quarterbacks
- Harlon Barnett – Defensive coordinator/defensive backs
- Greg Frey – Offensive line
- Odell Haggins – Defensive tackle
- Mark Snyder – Defensive ends
- Telly Lockette – Tight ends
- David Kelly – Wide receivers
- Donte Pimpleton – Running backs
- Raymond Woodie – Linebackers
- Alonzo Hamilton – Special Teams
- Irele Oderinde – Strength and conditioning
- Mickey Andrews – Special assistant

== Roster ==
2018 Florida State Seminoles football team roster
Players
Coaches
Offense

Pos.	#	Name	Class
QB	1	James Blackman	So
RB	3	Cam Akers	So
RB	4	Khalan Laborn	Fr
TE	6	Tre' McKitty	So
WR	8	Nyqwan Murray	Sr
RB	9	Jacques Patrick	Sr
RB	10	Anthony Grant	Fr
WR	11	George Campbell	Jr
QB	12	Deondre Francois	Jr
WR	13	Caleb Ward	Fr
QB	14	Nolan McDonald	Fr
WR	14	Deonté Sheffield	Fr
WR	15	Tamorrion Terry	Fr
QB	16	Alex Eleyssami	Fr
WR	18	Warren Thompson	Fr
QB	19	Beau Fillichio	Fr
WR	20	Keyshawn Helton	Fr
RB	22	Amir Rasul	Jr
TE	26	Johnathan Vickers	Sr
WR	28	D'Marcus Adams	Fr
WR	29	D.J. Matthews	So
TE	32	Gabe Nabers	Jr
RB	37	Blaik Middleton	Jr
WR	41	Michael Barulich	So
OL	51	Baveon Johnson	So
OL	52	Christian Meadows	Fr
OL	54	Alec Eberle	Sr
OL	59	Brady Scott	Fr
OL	61	Jalen Goss	Fr
OL	66	Andrew Basham	Jr
OL	68	Jeremy Czerenda	Fr
OL	69	Landon Dickerson	So
OL	70	Cole Minshew	Jr
OL	71	Chaz Neal	Fr
OL	72	Mike Arnold	So
OL	73	Jauan Williams	So
OL	74	Derrick Kelly II	Sr
OL	75	Abdul Bello	Jr
OL	76	Arthur Williams	Sr
OL	77	Christian Armstrong	Fr
WR	80	Ontaria Wilson	Fr
TE	81	Alex Marshall	Fr
TE	82	Naseir Upshur	Jr
WR	83	Jordan Young	Fr
WR	84	Adarius Dent	Fr
WR	85	Tyrell Moorer	Jr
TE	87	Camren McDonald	Fr
WR	88	Tre'Shaun Harrison	Fr
WR	89	Keith Gavin	Jr

Defense

Pos.	#	Name	Class
DB	1	Levonta Taylor	Jr
LB	5	Dontavious Jackson	Jr
DB	8	Stanford Samuels III	So
DL	11	Janarius Robinson	So
DB	12	A.J. Lytton	Fr
DL	13	Joshua Kaindoh	So
DB	14	Kale Meyers	Jr
DB	15	Carlos Becker III	Jr
DL	16	Cory Durden	Fr
DB	19	A.J. Westbrook	Sr
LB	20	Jaiden Woodbey	Fr
DL	21	Marvin Wilson	So
LB	22	Adonis Thomas	Jr
DB	23	Hamsah Nasirildeen	So
DB	24	Cyrus Fagan	So
DB	26	Asante Samuel Jr.	Fr
LB	27	Zaquandre White	Fr
LB	28	DeCalon Brooks	Fr
DB	29	Isaiah Bolden	Fr
DL	31	Kris Dixon	Jr
DB	32	Array Culmer	Sr
LB	33	Amari Gainer	Fr
LB	35	Leonard Warner III	So
DB	37	Kameron House	So
DB	38	Izaiah Prouse-Lackey	Sr
DB	39	Claudio Williams	Jr
LB	41	Joseph Garcia	So
DB	43	Joseph Schergen	So
DB	45	Demetrius Artis	Jr
DB	46	John Moschella III	Sr
LB	48	Armani Kerr	So
DL	49	Cedric Wood	So
LB	51	Josh Brown	Jr
DL	53	Ja'Len Parks	Fr
DL	55	Fredrick Jones	Sr
LB	56	Emmett Rice	Jr
DL	58	Dennis Briggs Jr.	Fr
DL	59	Xavier Peters	Fr
DL	67	Adam Torres	Sr
DL	90	Demarcus Christmas	Sr
DL	91	Robert Cooper	Fr
DL	93	Peter Osimen	Jr
DL	94	Walvenski Aimé	Sr
DL	95	Jamarcus Chatman	Fr
DL	97	Malcolm Lamar	Fr
DL	99	Brian Burns	Jr

Special teams

Pos.	#	Name	Class
P	21	Logan Tyler	Jr
K	23	Ricky Aguayo	Jr
P	30	Tommy Martin	Fr
LS	40	Ken Burnham	Sr
LS	42	Garrett Murray	Fr
LS	44	Grant Glennon	Fr
LS	63	Tanner Adkison	So

Head coach

- Willie Taggart

Coordinators/assistant coaches

- Walt Bell – Offensive coordinator/quarterbacks
- Harlon Barnett – Defensive coordinator/defensive backs
- Greg Frey – Offensive line
- Odell Haggins – Defensive tackle
- Mark Snyder – Defensive ends
- Telly Lockette – Tight ends
- David Kelly – Wide receivers
- Donte Pimpleton – Running backs
- Raymond Woodie – Linebackers
- Alonzo Hamilton – Special Teams
- Irele Oderinde – Strength and conditioning
- Mickey Andrews – Special assistant

Legend

- (C) Team captain
- (S) Suspended
- (I) Ineligible
- Injured
- Redshirt

Roster
Last update: 1/1/19

== Rankings ==
Ranking movements Legend: ██ Increase in ranking ██ Decrease in ranking — = Not ranked RV = Received votes
	Week															
Poll	Pre	1	2	3	4	5	6	7	8	9	10	11	12	13	14	Final
AP	19	RV	RV	—	—	—	—	—	—	—	—	—	—	—	—	—
Coaches	19	RV	RV	—	—	—	—	—	—	—	—	—	—	—	—	—
CFP	Not released									—	—	—	—	—	—	Not released

== Game summaries ==
=== Virginia Tech ===
	1	2	3	4	Total
No. 20 Hokies	10	7	0	7	24
No. 19 Seminoles	0	3	0	0	3

=== Samford ===
	1	2	3	4	Total
No. 9 (FCS) Bulldogs	16	7	0	3	26
Seminoles	7	14	0	15	36

=== At Syracuse ===
	1	2	3	4	Total
Seminoles	0	0	0	7	7
Orange	3	3	14	10	30

=== Northern Illinois ===
	1	2	3	4	Total
Huskies	0	7	6	6	19
Seminoles	14	6	3	14	37

=== At Louisville ===
	1	2	3	4	Total
Seminoles	7	0	7	14	28
Cardinals	7	14	3	0	24

=== At Miami (FL) ===
	1	2	3	4	Total
Seminoles	7	13	7	0	27
No. 17 Hurricanes	0	7	14	7	28

=== Wake Forest ===
	1	2	3	4	Total
Demon Deacons	10	0	0	7	17
Seminoles	7	14	10	7	38

=== Clemson ===
	1	2	3	4	Total
No. 2 Tigers	0	28	24	7	59
Seminoles	0	0	3	7	10

=== At NC State ===
	1	2	3	4	Total
Seminoles	0	14	7	7	28
Wolfpack	10	17	10	10	47

=== At Notre Dame ===
	1	2	3	4	Total
Seminoles	0	6	7	0	13
No. 3 Fighting Irish	17	15	3	7	42

=== Boston College ===
	1	2	3	4	Total
No. 22 Eagles	0	7	7	7	21
Seminoles	0	6	7	9	22

=== Florida ===
	1	2	3	4	Total
No. 13 Gators	3	10	14	14	41
Seminoles	0	7	7	0	14

== Post-season ==
=== All-ACC ===
The Seminoles had five players selected to the All-ACC team, with three defensive selections and two offensive selections.

- Brian Burns (first team)
- Nyqwan Murray (Third Team)
- Demarcus Christmas (Third Team)
- Marvin Wilson (Honorable Mention)
- Tamorrion Terry (Honorable Mention)

=== NFL draft ===
Player	Team	Round	Pick #	Position
Brian Burns	Carolina Panthers	1st	16	LB
Demarcus Christmas	Seattle Seahawks	6th	209	DT
