= 2017 Florida State Seminoles football team =

American college football season

2017 Florida State Seminoles football

Independence Bowl champion

Independence Bowl, W 42–13 vs. Southern Miss
- Conference: Atlantic Coast Conference
- Atlantic Division
- Record: 7–6 (3–5 ACC)
- Head coach: Jimbo Fisher (8th season; first 11 games); Odell Haggins (interim; final 2 games)
- Co-offensive coordinators: Lawrence Dawsey (4th season); Randy Sanders (4th season)
- Offensive scheme: Pro-style
- Defensive coordinator: Charles Kelly (4th season)
- Base defense: 4–2–5
- Home stadium: Doak Campbell Stadium

Uniform
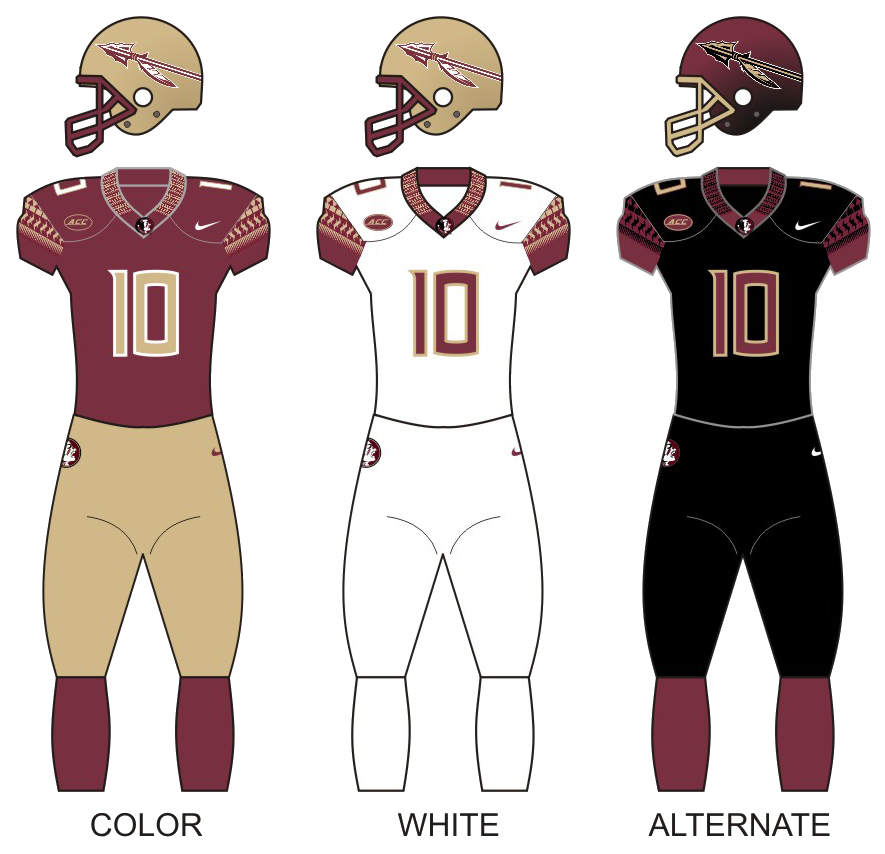

2017 Atlantic Coast Conference football standings
	Conf.			Overall
Team	W		L	W		L
Atlantic Division
No. 4 Clemson xy$^	7	–	1	12	–	2
No. 23 NC State	6	–	2	9	–	4
Wake Forest	4	–	4	8	–	5
Louisville	4	–	4	8	–	5
Boston College	4	–	4	7	–	6
Florida State	3	–	5	7	–	6
Syracuse	2	–	6	4	–	8
Coastal Division
No. 13 Miami (FL) xy	7	–	1	10	–	3
No. 24 Virginia Tech	5	–	3	9	–	4
Georgia Tech	4	–	4	5	–	6
Virginia	3	–	5	6	–	7
Pittsburgh	3	–	5	5	–	7
Duke	3	–	5	7	–	6
North Carolina	1	–	7	3	–	9
Championship: Clemson 38, Miami 3
^ – College Football Playoff participant; $ – Conference champion; x – Division champion/co-champions; y – Championship game participant; Rankings from AP Poll

The 2017 Florida State Seminoles football team represented Florida State University in the sport of American football during the 2017 NCAA Division I FBS football season. The Seminoles competed in the Atlantic Division of the Atlantic Coast Conference and were led by eighth-year head coach Jimbo Fisher until he left to coach at Texas A&M before the final game of the regular season. They were then coached by interim head coach Odell Haggins. Home games were played at Doak Campbell Stadium in Tallahassee, Florida.

In 2016, the Seminoles won 10 games for the fifth straight season and appeared in the Orange Bowl, a fifth consecutive appearance in a major bowl game. Running back Dalvin Cook, defensive end DeMarcus Walker, offensive tackle Roderick Johnson and cornerback Marquez White went on to be selected in the NFL draft.

Prior to the start of the season, Deondre Francois, Jacques Patrick, Cam Akers, Nyqwan Murray, Landon Dickerson, and Cole Minshew were named preseason All-ACC offensive selections while Derwin James, Tarvarus McFadden, Derrick Nnadi, Josh Sweat, Brian Burns, and Matthew Thomas were named preseason All-ACC defensive selections. In the pre-season media poll, Florida State was picked to finish first in the ACC Atlantic and win the conference title and Francois was picked as runner-up for ACC Player of the Year while Alec Eberle, McFadden, and James were named to the pre-season All-ACC team.

In the opening game against Alabama, quarterback Deondre Francois suffered a season ending knee injury which resulted in true freshman James Blackman being named the starter for the remainder of the season, leading to the program's worst start since 1976 although the Seminoles went on to become bowl eligible for the 36th consecutive year. Following the game against Florida, Jimbo Fisher resigned as coach; associate coach Odell Haggins was named interim head coach for the remainder of the season.

== Coaching staff ==
Florida State Seminoles coaches

Head coach

- Jimbo Fisher (thru 12/1/17)
- Odell Haggins (interim; 2 games)

Assistant coaches

- Rick Trickett – Assistant head coach and offensive line coach
- Charles Kelly – Defensive coordinator and secondary coach
- Randy Sanders – Co-Offensive coordinator/quarterbacks coach
- Lawrence Dawsey – Co-Offensive coordinator/wide receivers coach
- Brad lawing – Defensive head coach/defensive ends coach
- Odell Haggins – Associate coach/defensive line coach
- Jay Graham – Running backs coach/special teams coordinator
- Tim Brewster – Tight ends coach/recruiting coordinator
- Bill Miller – Linebackers coach
- Vic viloria – Head strength and conditioning coach

Support staff

- Addison Lynch
- Kurt Kennedy
- Jeremiah Wilson
- Brian Williams
- Jamie Mujeni
- Bert Biffani
- David Spurlock
- Tino Sunseri
- Matt McCutchan
- Andrew Priest
- Mike Warren
- Mario Edwards Sr.
- Myles Notkin

== Roster ==
2017 Florida State Seminoles football
Quarterback: 10 Bailey Hockman – Freshman (6′2, 187); 12 Deondre Francois – (redshirt) Sophomore (6′2, 205); 14 Jake Rizzo – (redshirt) Freshman (6′0, 193); 16 J.J. Costentino – (redshirt) Junior (6′5, 230); 1 James Blackman – Freshman (6′5, 163); Tailback: 3 Cam Akers – Freshman (5′11, 213) *; 7 Ryan Green – (redshirt) Senior (5′11, 204); 9 Jacques Patrick – Junior (6′2, 231); 22 Amir Rasul – Sophomore (5′10, 196); 26 Johnathan Vickers – (redshirt) Junior (6′1, 228); 37 Blaik Middleton – (redshirt) Sophomore (5′10, 194); 43 Jake Duff – (redshirt) Sophomore (6′0, 184); 14 Deonte Sheffield – Freshman (5′10, 198); 27 Zaquandre White – Freshman (6′0, 210); Fullback: 33 Colton Plante – Junior (6′2, 236); 35 Gabe Nabers – Sophomore (6′3, 244); Wide receiver: 5 Da'Vante Phillips – Junior (6′1, 206); 8 Nyqwan Murray – Junior (5′11, 176); 11 George Campbell – (redshirt) Sophomore (6′4, 207); 18 Auden Tate – Junior (6′5, 225); 27 Tyriq Withers – (redshirt) Freshman (6′4, 197); 28 Gilbert Henric – (redshirt) Sophomore (6′0, 194); 83 Bryan LaCivita – (redshirt) Senior (6′1, 178); 86 Justin Motlow – (redshirt) Junior (5′11, 183); 87 Jared Jackson – (redshirt) Senior (6′2, 199); 89 Keith Gavin – Sophomore (6′3, 225); 4 Khalan Laborn – Freshman (5′10, 199) (+RB); 29 D.J. Matthews – Freshman (5′11, 160); 15 Tamorrion Terry – Freshman (6′4, 208); Tight end: 6 Tre' McKitty – Freshman (6′4, 235); 36 Eric Johnson – (redshirt) Freshman (6′5, 225); 48 Benjamin Hoyle – Sophomore (6′5, 220); 49 N'Namdi Green – (redshirt) Freshman (6′3, 238); 81 Ryan Izzo – (redshirt) Junior (6′5, 245); 82 Naseir Upshur – Sophomore (6′2, 249); 88 Mavin Saunders – (redshirt) Junior (6′5, 257); 80 Alexander Marshall – Freshman (6′7, 240) *; Kicker: 21 Logan Tyler – Sophomore (6′0, 201); 23 Ricky Aguayo – Sophomore (6′2, 196)	Offensive lineman: 51 Baveon Johnson – (redshirt) Freshman (6′3, 326); 52 David Robbins – (redshirt) Sophomore (6′4, 324); 53 Joshua Peters – (redshirt) Junior (6′3, 274); 54 Alec Eberle – (redshirt) Junior (6′4, 294); 57 Corey Martinez – (redshirt) Junior (6′4, 298); 60 Andrew Boselli – (redshirt) Freshman (6′4, 303); 62 Ethan Frith – Junior (6′7, 316); 68 Greg Turnage – (redshirt) Sophomore (6′3, 283); 69 Landon Dickerson – Sophomore (6′5, 310); 71 Brock Ruble – (redshirt) Junior (6′8, 319); 70 Cole Minshew – (redshirt) Freshman (6′5, 338); 72 Mike Arnold – (redshirt) Freshman (6′4, 339); 73 Jauan Williams – (redshirt) Freshman (6′6, 300); 74 Derrick Kelly II – (redshirt) Junior (6′5, 323); 75 Abdul Bello – (redshirt) Sophomore (6′6, 312); 76 Rick Leonard – Senior (6′7, 306); 79 Josh Ball – (redshirt) Freshman (6′8, 287); 59 Brady Scott – Freshman (6′5, 285); Defensive tackle: 12 Arthur Williams – (redshirt) Junior (6′4, 327); 49 Cedric Wood – (redshirt) Freshman (6′3, 321); 55 Fredrick Jones – (redshirt) Junior (6′3, 298); 86 Darvin Taylor II – (redshirt) Sophomore (6′3, 304); 90 Demarcus Christmas – (redshirt) Junior (6′4, 308); 91 Derrick Nnadi – Senior (6′1, 312); 94 Walvenski Aime – Junior (6′5, 300); 96 Justin Smith – (redshirt) Freshman (6′3, 265); 98 JT Mertz – Junior (6′2, 265); 21 Marvin Wilson – Freshman (6′4, 329); 53 Ja'len Parks – Freshman (6′3, 288); 92 Cory Durden – Freshman (6′4, 316); Defensive end: 9 Josh Sweat – Junior (6′5, 250); 11 Janarius Robinson – (redshirt) Freshman (6′5, 249); 13 Joshua Kaindoh – Freshman (6′6, 250); 31 Kris Dixon – (redshirt) Sophomore (6′1, 217); 39 Claudio Williams – (redshirt) Sophomore (6′0, 260); 67 Adam Torres – (redshirt) Junior (6′4, 281); 84 Jalen Wilkerson – (redshirt) Sophomore (6′4, 273); 97 Isaiah Smallwood – (redshirt) Junior (6′3, 216); 99 Brian Burns – Sophomore (6′5, 218); 98 Tre Lawson – Freshman (6′6, 240)	Linebacker: 5 Dontavius Jackson – Sophomore (6′2, 249); 6 Matthew Thomas – (redshirt) Senior (6′3, 227); 16 Jacob Pugh – Senior (6′4, 229); 18 Ro'Derrick Hoskins – (redshirt) Senior (6′2, 240); 22 Adonis Thomas – (redshirt) Sophomore (6′3, 228); 36 Brandon Barrett – (redshirt) Sophomore (6′1, 230); 40 Nick Patti – (redshirt) Junior (6′1, 225); 45 Delvin Purifoy – (redshirt) Junior (6′2, 246); 47 Joseph Garcia – (redshirt) Freshman (6′2, 210); 48 Vernon Norwood – (redshirt) Junior (6′0, 214); 51 Josh Brown – Sophomore (6′3, 216); 56 Emmett Rice – Sophomore (6′2, 203); 35 Leonard Warner – Freshman (6′4, 226); 26 DeCalon Brooks – Freshman (5′11, 197); Defensive backs: 1 Levonta Taylor – Sophomore (5′10, 169); 3 Derwin James – (redshirt) Sophomore (6′3, 211); 4 Tarvarus McFadden – Junior (6′2, 198); 7 Ermon Lane – Senior (6′3, 209); 8 Stanford Samuels III – Freshman (6′2, 170); 10 Calvin Brewton – Junior (6′0, 186); 13 Lawrence Dawsey Jr. – (redshirt) Freshman (5′11, 165); 15 Carlos Becker III – Sophomore (6′2, 183); 19 A.J. Westbrook – Junior (6′0, 186); 20 Trey Marshall – Senior (6′0, 210); 23 Herbans Paul – (redshirt) Senior (6′2, 191); 24 Cyrus Fagan – Freshman (6′2, 180); 26 Joseph Schergen – (redshirt) Freshman (5′9, 170); 28 Malique Jackson – Senior (6′0, 170); 29 Nate Andrews – (redshirt) Senior (6′0, 214); 32 Array Culmer – (redshirt) Junior (5′7, 158); 33 Kameron House – (redshirt) Freshman (5′10, 185); 35 Michael Barulich – (redshirt) Sophomore (5′11, 195); 37 Kyle Meyers – Sophomore (6′0, 168) *; 38 Izaiah Prouse-Lackey – (redshirt) Junior (5′9, 177); 41 Zachary Weber – (redshirt) Freshman (6′0, 190); 46 John Moschella III – (redshirt) Freshman (5′9, 190); 23 Hamsah Nasirildeen – Freshman (6′3, 210) *; 27 Ontaria Wilson – Freshman (6′0, 160) *; Long snappers: 40 Ken Burnham – (redshirt) Junior (6′0, 203); 47 Stephen Gabbard – Senior (6′3, 248); 63 Tanner Adkison – (redshirt) Freshman (5′10, 190); Grant glennon – Freshman (6′3, 220)
2017 Florida State Spring Football Roster

== Rankings ==
Ranking movements Legend: ██ Increase in ranking ██ Decrease in ranking — = Not ranked RV = Received votes ( ) = First-place votes
	Week															
Poll	Pre	1	2	3	4	5	6	7	8	9	10	11	12	13	14	Final
AP	3 (4)	10	11	12	RV	RV	—	RV	—	—	—	—	—	—	—	—
Coaches	3 (4)	9	10	11	25	RV	—	—	—	—	—	—	—	—	—	—
CFP	Not released									—	—	—	—	—	—	Not released

== Schedule ==
Date	Time	Opponent	Rank	Site	TV	Result	Attendance
September 2	8:00 p.m.	vs. No. 1 Alabama*	No. 3	Mercedes-Benz Stadium; Atlanta, GA (Chick-fil-A Kickoff) (College GameDay)	ABC	L 7–24	76,330
September 23	12:00 p.m.	NC State	No. 12	Doak Campbell Stadium; Tallahassee, FL	ABC/ESPN2	L 21–27	73,541
September 30	3:30 p.m.	at Wake Forest		BB&T Field; Winston-Salem, NC	ABC	W 26–19	31,588
October 7 (Note: The game between Florida State and Miami, originally scheduled to be played on September 16, was moved to October 7 due to the effects of Hurricane Irma.)	3:30 p.m.	No. 13 Miami (FL)		Doak Campbell Stadium; Tallahassee, FL (rivalry)	ESPN	L 20–24	78,169
October 14	12:00 p.m.	at Duke		Wallace Wade Stadium; Durham, NC	ESPN2	W 17–10	31,073
October 21	12:00 p.m.	Louisville		Doak Campbell Stadium; Tallahassee, FL	ESPN	L 28–31	72,764
October 27	8:00 p.m.	at Boston College		Alumni Stadium; Chestnut Hill, MA	ESPN	L 3–35	40,629
November 4	12:20 p.m.	Syracuse		Doak Campbell Stadium; Tallahassee, FL	ACCN	W 27–24	71,805
November 11	3:30 p.m.	at No. 4 Clemson		Memorial Stadium; Clemson, SC (rivalry)	ESPN	L 14–31	81,436
November 18	12:00 p.m.	Delaware State*^{†}		Doak Campbell Stadium; Tallahassee, FL	ACCRSN	W 77–6	70,599
November 25	12:00 p.m.	at Florida*		Ben Hill Griffin Stadium; Gainesville, FL (rivalry)	ESPN	W 38–22	89,066
December 2 (Note: The game between Florida State and Louisiana-Monroe, originally scheduled for September 9, was canceled due to inclement weather from Hurricane Irma and later rescheduled for December 2.)	12:00 p.m.	Louisiana–Monroe*		Doak Campbell Stadium; Tallahassee, FL	ACCN Extra	W 42–10	58,780
December 27	1:30 p.m.	vs. Southern Miss*		Independence Stadium; Shreveport, LA (Independence Bowl)	ESPN	W 42–13	33,601
*Non-conference game; ^{†}Homecoming; Rankings from AP Poll released prior to the game; All times are in Eastern time

=== Alabama ===
Florida State vs. Alabama

Quarter	1	2	3	4	Total
#3 Seminoles	0	7	0	0	7
#1 Crimson Tide	3	7	11	3	24

at Mercedes-Benz Stadium, Atlanta, Georgia

- Date: September 2
- Game time: 8:16 p.m. EST
- Game weather: Indoors
- Game attendance: 76,330
- Referee: Michael Cannon
- TV announcers (ABC): Chris Fowler (play-by-play), Kirk Herbstreit (analyst), Maria Taylor and Tom Rinaldi (sidelines)

Total Yards
250
Passing yards
210
Rushing yards
40
Leading Passer
Deondre Francois
19/33; 210 yards, 1 TD
Leading Rusher
Cam Akers
10 carries, 30 yards
Leading Receiver
Keith Gavin
7 receptions, 50 yards

=== NC State ===
NC State vs. Florida State

Quarter	1	2	3	4	Total
Wolfpack	10	7	3	7	27
#12 Seminoles	0	10	3	8	21

at Doak Campbell Stadium, Tallahassee, Florida

- Date: September 23
- Game time: 12:06 p.m. EST
- Game weather: Temperature: 83 °F (28 °C) • Wind: NE 7 mph (11 km/h) • Weather: Partly cloudy
- Game attendance: 73,541
- Referee: Jeff Flanagan
- TV announcers (ABC/ESPN2): Jason Benetti (play-by-play), Anthony Becht (analyst), Rocky Boiman (sideline)

Total Yards
382
Passing yards
278
Rushing yards
104
Leading Passer
James Blackman
22/38; 278 yards, 1 TD
Leading Rusher
Cam Akers
12 carries, 56 yards
Leading Receiver
Auden Tate
9 receptions, 138 yards, 1 TD

=== Wake Forest ===
Florida State vs. Wake Forest

Quarter	1	2	3	4	Total
Seminoles	3	10	3	10	26
Demon Deacons	3	9	0	7	19

at BB&T Field, Winston-Salem, North Carolina

- Date: September 30
- Game time: 3:36 p.m. EST
- Game weather: Temperature: 74 °F (23 °C) • Wind: NNE 10 mph (16 km/h) • Weather: Mostly sunny
- Game attendance: 31,588
- Referee: David Epperley
- TV announcers (ABC): Mike Patrick (play-by-play), Tommy Tuberville (analyst), Paul Carcaterra (sideline)

Total Yards
270
Passing yards
121
Rushing yards
149
Leading Passer
James Blackman
11/21; 121 yards, 1 TD
Leading Rusher
Jacques Patrick
19 carries, 120 yards, 1 TD
Leading Receiver
Jacques Patrick
3 receptions, 26 yards

=== Miami (FL) ===
Miami vs. Florida State

Quarter	1	2	3	4	Total
#13 Hurricanes	0	0	10	14	24
Seminoles	3	0	0	17	20

at Doak Campbell Stadium, Tallahassee, Florida

- Date: October 7
- Game time: 3:35 p.m. EST
- Game weather: Temperature: 89 °F (32 °C) • Wind: SE 11 mph (18 km/h) • Weather: Cloudy
- Game attendance: 78,169
- Referee: Duane Heydt
- TV announcers (ESPN): Dave Pasch (play-by-play), Greg McElroy (analyst), Tom Luginbill (sideline)

Total Yards
406
Passing yards
203
Rushing yards
203
Leading Passer
James Blackman
17/28; 203 yards, 2 TD
Leading Rusher
Cam Akers
20 carries, 121 yards
Leading Receiver
Auden Tate
3 receptions, 56 yards, 1 TD

=== Duke ===
Florida State vs. Duke

Quarter	1	2	3	4	Total
Seminoles	7	0	3	7	17
Blue Devils	0	3	7	0	10

at Wallace Wade Stadium, Durham, North Carolina

- Date: October 14
- Game time: 12:01 p.m. EST
- Game weather: Temperature: 72 °F (22 °C) • Wind: N 3 mph (4.8 km/h) • Weather: Partly cloudy
- Game attendance: 31,073
- Referee: Jeff Maconaghy
- TV announcers (ESPN2): Jason Benetti (play-by-play), Kelly Stouffer (analyst), Kris Budden (sideline)

Total Yards
425
Passing yards
197
Rushing yards
228
Leading Passer
James Blackman
18/21; 197 yards, 1 TD
Leading Rusher
Cam Akers
15 carries, 115 yards, 1 TD
Leading Receiver
Nyqwan Murray
5 receptions, 81 yards

=== Louisville ===
Louisville vs. Florida State

Quarter	1	2	3	4	Total
Cardinals	7	7	14	3	31
Seminoles	7	7	0	14	28

at Doak Campbell Stadium, Tallahassee, Florida

- Date: October 21
- Game time: 12:02 p.m. EST
- Game weather: Temperature: 78 °F (26 °C) • Wind: E 13 mph (21 km/h) • Weather: Humid
- Game attendance: 72,764
- Referee: Jeff Flanagan
- TV announcers (ESPN): Mark Jones (play-by-play), Rod Gilmore (analyst), Quint Kessenich (sideline)

Total Yards
403
Passing yards
248
Rushing yards
155
Leading Passer
James Blackman
16/28; 248 yards, 2 TD
Leading Rusher
Cam Akers
16 carries, 75 yards
Leading Receiver
Nyqwan Murray
4 receptions, 95 yards

=== Boston College ===
Florida State vs. Boston College

Quarter	1	2	3	4	Total
Seminoles	0	3	0	0	3
Eagles	7	14	14	0	35

at Alumni Stadium, Chestnut Hill, Massachusetts

- Date: October 27
- Game time: 8:01 p.m. EST
- Game weather: Temperature: 52 °F (11 °C) • Wind: SW 7 mph (11 km/h) • Weather: Humid
- Game attendance: 40,629
- Referee: Stuart Mullins
- TV announcers (ESPN): Adam Amin (play-by-play), Mack Brown (analyst), Jen Lada (sideline)

Total Yards
213
Passing yards
149
Rushing yards
64
Leading Passer
James Blackman
11/26; 102 yards
Leading Rusher
Cam Akers
18 carries, 42 yards
Leading Receiver
Nyqwan Murray
3 receptions, 102 yards

=== Syracuse ===
Syracuse vs. Florida State

Quarter	1	2	3	4	Total
Orange	0	14	3	7	24
Seminoles	7	14	3	3	27

at Doak Campbell Stadium, Tallahassee, Florida

- Date: November 4
- Game time: 12:22 p.m. EST
- Game weather: Temperature: 78 °F (26 °C) • Wind: ENE 3 mph (4.8 km/h) • Weather: Clear
- Game attendance: 71,805
- Referee: Gary Patterson
- TV announcers (ACC Network): Tom Werme (play-by-play), Dave Archer (analyst), D.J. Shockley (sideline)

Total Yards
343
Passing yards
136
Rushing yards
207
Leading Passer
James Blackman
12/19; 136 yards, 1 TD
Leading Rusher
Cam Akers
22 carries, 209 yards, 2 TD
Leading Receiver
Nyqwan Murray
3 receptions, 60 yards, 1 TD

=== Clemson ===
Florida State vs. Clemson

Quarter	1	2	3	4	Total
Seminoles	0	0	7	7	14
#4 Tigers	7	10	0	14	31

at Memorial Stadium, Clemson, South Carolina

- Date: November 11
- Game time: 3:36 p.m. EST
- Game weather: Temperature: 48 °F (9 °C) • Wind: ENE 10 mph (16 km/h) • Weather: Mostly sunny
- Game attendance: 81,436
- Referee: Jeff Flanagan
- TV announcers (ESPN): Steve Levy (play-by-play), Brian Griese (analyst), Todd McShay (sideline)

Total Yards
229
Passing yards
208
Rushing yards
21
Leading Passer
James Blackman
13/32; 208 yards, TD
Leading Rusher
Cam Akers
12 carries, 40 yards
Leading Receiver
Nyqwan Murray
4 receptions, 73 yards

=== Delaware State ===
Overall record
0–0

Delaware State vs. Florida State

Quarter	1	2	3	4	Total
Hornets	6	0	0	0	6
Seminoles	21	35	7	14	77

at Doak Campbell Stadium, Tallahassee, Florida

- Date: November 18
- Game time: 12:04 p.m. EST
- Game weather: Temperature: 70 °F (21 °C) • Wind: N 2 mph (3.2 km/h) • Weather: Clear
- Game attendance: 70,599
- Referee: Duane Heydt
- TV announcers (Fox Sports Network): Evan Lepler (play-by-play), Takeo Spikes (analyst), Kelsey Wingert (sideline)

Total Yards
482
Passing yards
236
Rushing yards
246
Leading Passer
James Blackman
11/15; 179 yards, 3 TD
Leading Rusher
Ryan Green
7 carries, 96 yards, 2 TD
Leading Receiver
Keith Gavin
4 carries, 78 yards

=== Florida ===
Florida State vs. Florida

Quarter	1	2	3	4	Total
Seminoles	7	17	0	14	38
Gators	7	6	3	6	22

at Ben Hill Griffin Stadium, Gainesville, Florida

- Date: November 25
- Game time: 12:02 p.m. EST
- Game weather: Temperature: 68 °F (20 °C) • Wind: WNW 2 mph (3.2 km/h) • Weather: Sunny
- Game attendance: 89,066
- Referee: Matt Austin
- TV announcers (ESPN): Beth Mowins (play-by-play), Anthony Becht (analyst), Rocky Boiman (sideline)

Total Yards
216
Passing yards
128
Rushing yards
88
Leading Passer
James Blackman
10/21; 128 yards, 2 TD
Leading Rusher
Jacques Patrick
15 carries, 67 yards
Leading Receiver
Ermon Lane
1 reception, 39 yards

=== Louisiana-Monroe ===
Louisiana-Monroe vs. Florida State

Quarter	1	2	3	4	Total
Warhawks	0	0	10	0	10
Seminoles	7	7	14	14	42

at Doak Campbell Stadium, Tallahassee, Florida

- Date: December 2
- Game time: 12:04 p.m. EST
- Game weather: Temperature: 75 °F (24 °C) • Wind: W 3 mph (4.8 km/h) • Weather: Partly Cloudy
- Game attendance: 58,780
- Referee: David Epperley
- TV announcers (ACC Network Extra): Shawn Davison (play-by-play), Corey Simon (analyst), Ariya Massoudi (sideline)

Total Yards
504
Passing yards
199
Rushing yards
305
Leading Passer
James Blackman
14/22; 197 yards, 1 TD
Leading Rusher
Jacques Patrick
19 carries, 155 yards, 2 TD
Leading Receiver
Ermon Lane
3 receptions, 45 yards

=== Independence Bowl: Southern Miss ===
Southern Miss vs. Florida State (Independence Bowl)

Quarter	1	2	3	4	Total
Golden Eagles	6	0	7	0	13
Seminoles	7	16	10	9	42

at Independence Stadium, Shreveport, LA

- Date: December 27
- Game time: 1:35 p.m. EST
- Game weather: Temperature: 38 °F (3 °C) • Wind: 10 mph (16 km/h) • Weather: Cloudy
- Game attendance: 33,601
- Referee: Greg Sujack
- TV announcers (ESPN): Dave LaMont (play-by-play), Ahmad Brooks (analyst), Roddy Jones (sideline)

Total Yards
452
Passing yards
238
Rushing yards
214
Leading Passer
James Blackman
18/26; 233 yards, 4 TD
Leading Rusher
Cam Akers
13 carries, 94 yards
Leading Receiver
Auden Tate
5 receptions, 84 yards, 3 TD

== Awards ==
=== Watchlists ===
- Rimington Trophy

Alec Eberle

- Maxwell Award

Deondre Francois
Derwin James

- Bednarik Award

Derwin James
Matthew Thomas
Derrick Nnadi
Tarvarus McFadden

- John Mackey Award

Ryan Izzo

- Lou Groza Award

Ricky Aguayo

- Outland Trophy

Alex Eberle
Derrick Nnadi

- Nagurski Trophy

Derrick Nnadi
Josh Sweat
Tarvarus McFadden
Derwin James

- Jim Thorpe Award

Derwin James
Tarvarus McFadden

- Paul Hornung Award

Derwin James

- Butkus Award

Jacob Pugh
Matthew Thomas

- Wuerffel Trophy

Alec Eberle

- Davey O'Brien Award

Deondre Francois

- Doak Walker Award

Jacques Patrick

- Manning Award

Deondre Francois

- Ted Hendricks Award

Josh Sweat
Brian Burns

- Senior Bowl

Nate Andrews
Ermon Lane
Trey Marshall
Ro'Derrick Hoskins
Jacob Pugh
Matthew Thomas
Derrick Nnadi

=== Honors ===
Weekly awards
Player	Award	Date Awarded	Ref.
Josh Sweat	ACC Defensive Lineman of the Week	September 2, 2017	
Derwin James	ACC Defensive Back of the Week	September 2, 2017	
Ricky Aguayo	ACC Specialist of the Week	September 30, 2017	
Cam Akers	ACC Offensive Back of the Week; ACC Rookie of the Week	November 4, 2017	
Joshua Kaindoh	ACC Co-defensive Player of the Week	November 18, 2017	
Brian Burns	ACC Defensive Lineman of the Week	November 25, 2017	

==== All-ACC ====
Name	Selection
Derwin James	First Team (Defense)
Alec Eberle	Second Team (Offense)
Tarvarus McFadden	Second Team (Defense)
Cam Akers	Third Team (Offense)
Derrick Nnadi	Third Team (Defense)
Ricky Aguayo	Honorable Mention

==== All-Americans ====
Name	AP	AFCA	FWAA	TSN	WCFF	USA Today	Athlon	CBS	ESPN	SI
Derwin James	2nd	2nd	2nd	2nd	2nd			1st

== Bowl eligibility controversy ==
On December 21, 2017, a user on Reddit made a viral post questioning the bowl eligibility of Florida State in relation to their matchup against Delaware State. The user claimed to have received data on Delaware State's roster and scholarship allocation and determined that Delaware State had only 87% of their roster currently on athletic scholarship; the NCAA requires that an FCS team have at least 90% of its roster on scholarship in order for an FBS opponent to count a victory against an FCS team towards their bowl eligibility. The post was later echoed by college football analyst Brett McMurphy in a Facebook post.

However, Florida State refuted the post one day later, pointing out that while Delaware State had only offered athletic scholarships to 87% of its roster, it offered academic scholarships to other players, which was not mentioned in the original reports. Academic scholarships also counted towards the 90% scholarship threshold, and Delaware State offered enough in conjunction to their athletic scholarship allocation to allow the Seminoles' win versus the Hornets to count towards bowl eligibility. Florida State would defeat Southern Mississippi in the Independence Bowl six days later.

== NFL draft ==
Five Seminoles were chosen in the 2018 NFL draft:

Player	Team	Round	Pick #	Position
Derwin James	Los Angeles Chargers	1st	17	S
Derrick Nnadi	Kansas City Chiefs	3rd	75	DT
Rick Leonard	New Orleans Saints	4th	127	OT
Josh Sweat	Philadelphia Eagles	4th	130	DE
Ryan Izzo	New England Patriots	7th	250	TE
