= Blue chip (sports) =

Athletes targeted by drafting or signing at collegiate level

Blue chip is a term used in the United States to describe athletes, particularly high school players, targeted for drafting or signing by teams at the college level. In college football, the term is considered synonymous with four-star and five-star recruits, while in college basketball, the term may also refer exclusively to five-stars. Collegiate players being scouted by professional franchises may also be referred to as blue chips.

Blue chip players are those who have proven themselves to be among the best at their positions in their respective sports and are more sought after and wanted than other players. They are typically perceived as "can't miss" prospects who are desired by most organizations. Blue chip athletes are likely to have an immediate impact on teams that acquire them and have proven skills rather than speculative or untapped potential. Many top recruits eventually go on to be successful at the professional level, especially in basketball and baseball.

The term "blue chip" originated from the beginning of the 20th century from the game of poker. The blue chips were of the highest value, which was used to indicate high value stocks in the 1920's. The term later started applying to high value athletic prospects.

== Blue-chip ratio in college football ==
In college football, "Blue-Chip Ratio" (BCR) is the ratio of blue chips to non-blue chips a team signs over the previous four recruiting classes. Put more simply, it is the percentage of four-star and five-star players on a team. The concept was invented in 2013 by recruiting analyst Bud Elliott, who also posits that teams need to have a Blue-Chip Ratio of at least 50% to be able to win a national championship.

Blue-Chip Ratio is a widely recognized metric in the sport; it has been referenced by all major broadcast networks and is closely monitored by head coaches and administrators. It has also been covered and referenced by many other sports journalists.

=== Busting the blue-chip ratio ===
2025 Indiana won the national championship, despite having a Blue-Chip Ratio of around 8%. (Note: 2025 Indiana's BCR has been listed as 8% by multiple sports websites/journalists, and 4.35% by Rivals. According to 247Sports, the team had only seven four-stars.) 2010 Auburn also possibly did not meet the ratio, or just barely did. (Note: Elliott commented in 2019: "Either due to data changing after the fact, via industry contraction/expansion/merger, or perhaps due to an error of my own, 2010 Auburn no longer seems to meet 50% in the BCR [...] while I am confident that Auburn did meet the threshold when I was back-testing the model a half-decade ago, I can no longer back it up with proof." In 2020, The Athletic called the team "the closest thing to a rule-breaker".) Elliott has acknowledged that "standards are made to be broken."

Although the expanded College Football Playoff allows greater access to the playoff for less talented teams, the expansion also requires those less talented teams to win three or even four difficult games to win the national championship, possibly making it even more difficult for them to bust the ratio.

Elliott has cited 2014 Oregon, 2015 Clemson, 2021 Cincinnati, 2022 TCU, and 2023 Florida State as other examples of teams that came close to winning the national championship despite having a BCR less than 50%.

=== Transfers ===
Elliott does not include transfers in his calculations. Even with the transfer portal and the removal of transfer limitations in the early 2020s, national champions have not relied on outside players thus far. 2021 Georgia and 2022 Georgia made either few or no additions through the use of the portal. 2023 Michigan had nine transfers, regarded as important on the team, but most of the team was still recruited out of high school. The majority of transfers are used to fill holes in a roster, rather than adding talent. Most elite players are recruited out of high school and remain at the school with which they signed.

An analysis in 2023 showed that almost every top team's Blue-Chip Ratio decreased when including transfers.

=== Blue-chip ratio by year ===
The following are lists of all the teams that had a BCR of 50% or higher in recent seasons. Many Blue-Chip Ratios prior to 2014 are unreliable or unavailable, due to a lack of articles listing them, errors or discrepancies in older recruiting rankings, etc. Elliott has listed Blue-Chip Ratios of several national champions before 2014, but not non-champions. Teams that won the national championship are highlighted in bold.

==== 2005 ====
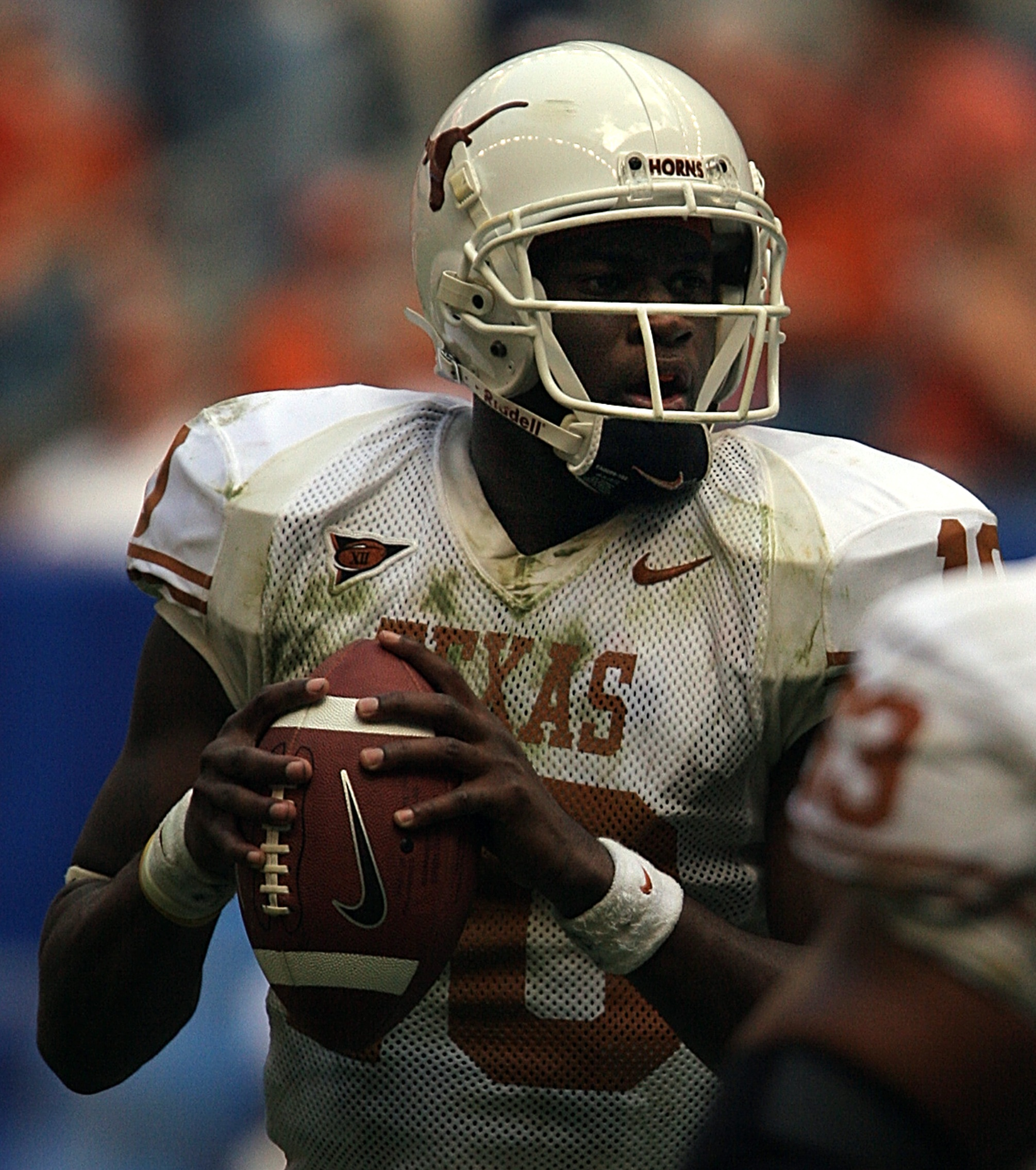
Texas won the national championship in 2005 with a BCR of 64%

- **Texas – 64%**

==== 2006 ====
- **Florida – 61%**

==== 2007 ====
- **LSU – 64%**

==== 2008 ====
- **Florida – 72%**

==== 2010 ====
- **Auburn – 50%**

==== 2011 ====
- **Alabama – 71%**

==== 2012 ====
- **Alabama – 71%**

==== 2013 ====
- **Florida State – 53%**

==== 2014 ====
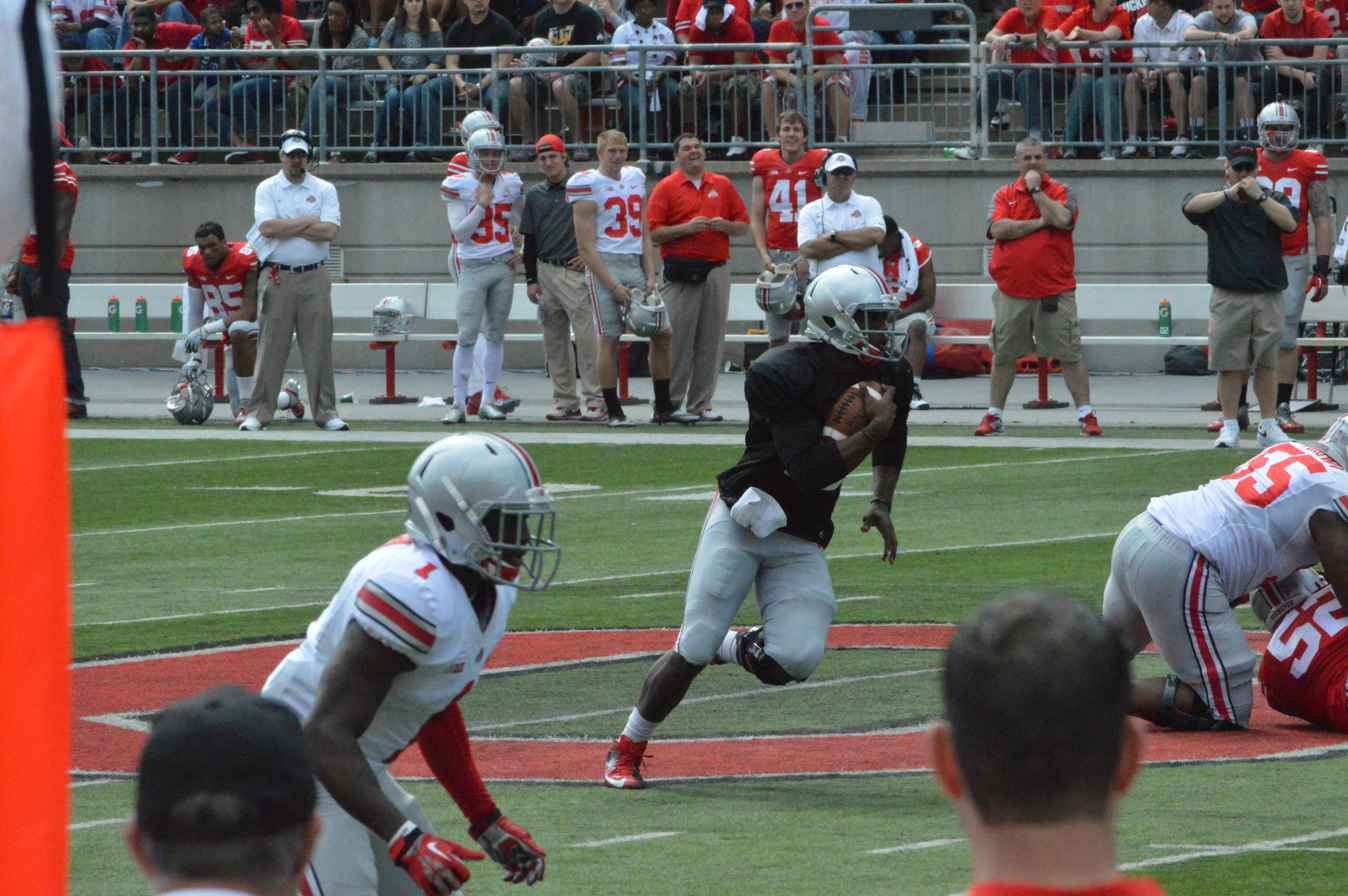
Ohio State won the national championship in 2014 with a BCR of 68%

Eleven teams had a BCR of 50% or higher during the 2014 season.

- Alabama – 73%
- **Ohio State – 68%**
- USC – 64%
- Notre Dame – 63%
- LSU – 62%
- Texas – 60%
- Florida State – 56%
- Michigan – 55%
- Florida – 54%
- Auburn – 53%
- Georgia – 51%

==== 2015 ====
Twelve teams had a BCR of 50% or higher during the 2015 season.

- **Alabama – 77%**
- USC – 70%
- Ohio State – 68%
- Notre Dame – 67%
- LSU – 61%
- Florida State – 60%
- Michigan – 59%
- Auburn – 56%
- Texas – 55%
- Texas A&M – 54%
- UCLA – 53%
- Georgia – 51%

==== 2016 ====
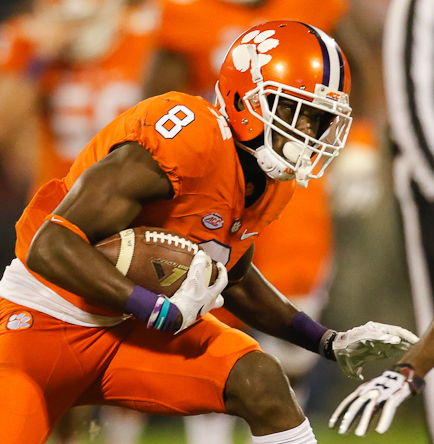
Clemson won the national championship in 2016 with a BCR of 52%

Thirteen teams had a BCR of 50% or higher during the 2016 season.

- Alabama – 77%
- USC – 70%
- Ohio State – 70%
- LSU – 66%
- Notre Dame – 63%
- Florida State – 60%
- Michigan – 59%
- Auburn – 57%
- UCLA – 55%
- Texas A&M – 53%
- Georgia – 52%
- **Clemson – 52%**
- Texas – 50%

==== 2017 ====
Ten teams had a BCR of 50% or higher during the 2017 season.

- **Alabama – 80%**
- Ohio State – 71%
- LSU – 65%
- Florida State – 65%
- Georgia – 63%
- USC – 63%
- Michigan – 61%
- Auburn – 59%
- Clemson – 56%
- Notre Dame – 56%

==== 2018 ====
Thirteen teams had a BCR of 50% or higher during the 2018 season.

- Alabama – 77%
- Ohio State – 76%
- USC – 71%
- Georgia – 69%
- Florida State – 67%
- LSU – 63%
- Auburn – 62%
- **Clemson – 61%**
- Michigan – 57%
- Texas – 55%
- Oklahoma – 53%
- Penn State – 53%
- Notre Dame – 51%

==== 2019 ====
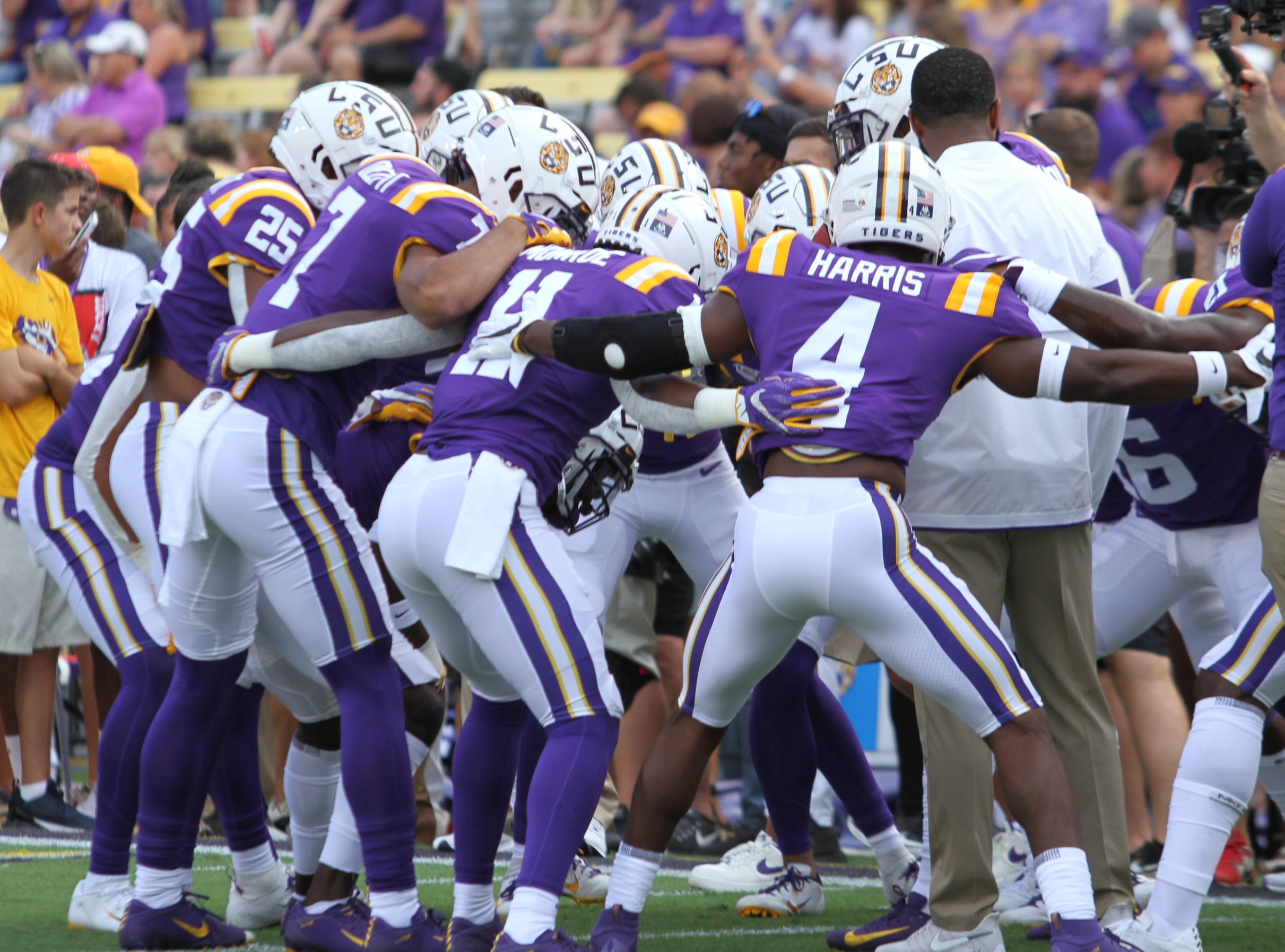
LSU won the national championship in 2019 with a BCR of 64%

Sixteen teams had a BCR of 50% or higher during the 2019 season.

- Ohio State – 81%
- Alabama – 80%
- Georgia – 79%
- **LSU – 64%**
- Florida State – 61%
- Clemson – 60%
- USC – 60%
- Penn State – 60%
- Michigan – 60%
- Texas – 60%
- Oklahoma – 60%
- Auburn – 58%
- Washington – 54%
- Notre Dame – 54%
- Florida – 53%
- Miami – 51%

==== 2020 ====
Fifteen teams had a BCR of 50% or higher during the 2020 season.

- **Alabama – 83%**
- Georgia – 82%
- Ohio State – 80%
- Texas – 64%
- LSU – 63%
- Oklahoma – 63%
- Clemson – 63%
- Florida – 63%
- Michigan – 59%
- Auburn – 59%
- Penn State – 59%
- Notre Dame – 56%
- Washington – 54%
- USC – 50%
- Texas A&M – 50%

==== 2021 ====
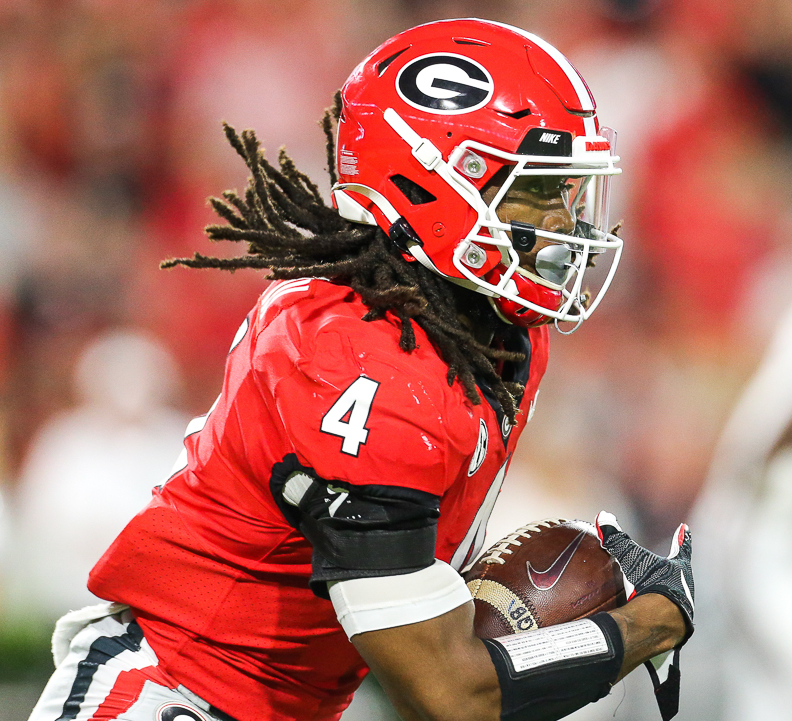
Georgia won the national championship in 2021 with a BCR of 80%

Sixteen teams had a BCR of 50% or higher during the 2021 season.

- Alabama – 84%
- **Georgia – 80%**
- Ohio State – 79%
- Clemson – 67%
- LSU – 66%
- Oklahoma – 66%
- Texas – 66%
- Florida – 66%
- Texas A&M – 61%
- Michigan – 58%
- Auburn – 56%
- Oregon – 56%
- Penn State – 56%
- Notre Dame – 55%
- Miami – 55%
- USC – 53%

==== 2022 ====
Fifteen teams had a BCR of 50% or higher during the 2022 season.

- Alabama – 89%
- Ohio State – 80%
- **Georgia – 77%**
- Oklahoma – 71%
- Texas A&M – 70%
- Texas – 68%
- LSU – 66%
- Clemson – 63%
- Notre Dame – 62%
- Florida – 60%
- Oregon – 60%
- Michigan – 59%
- Penn State – 55%
- Miami – 55%
- Auburn – 54%

==== 2023 ====
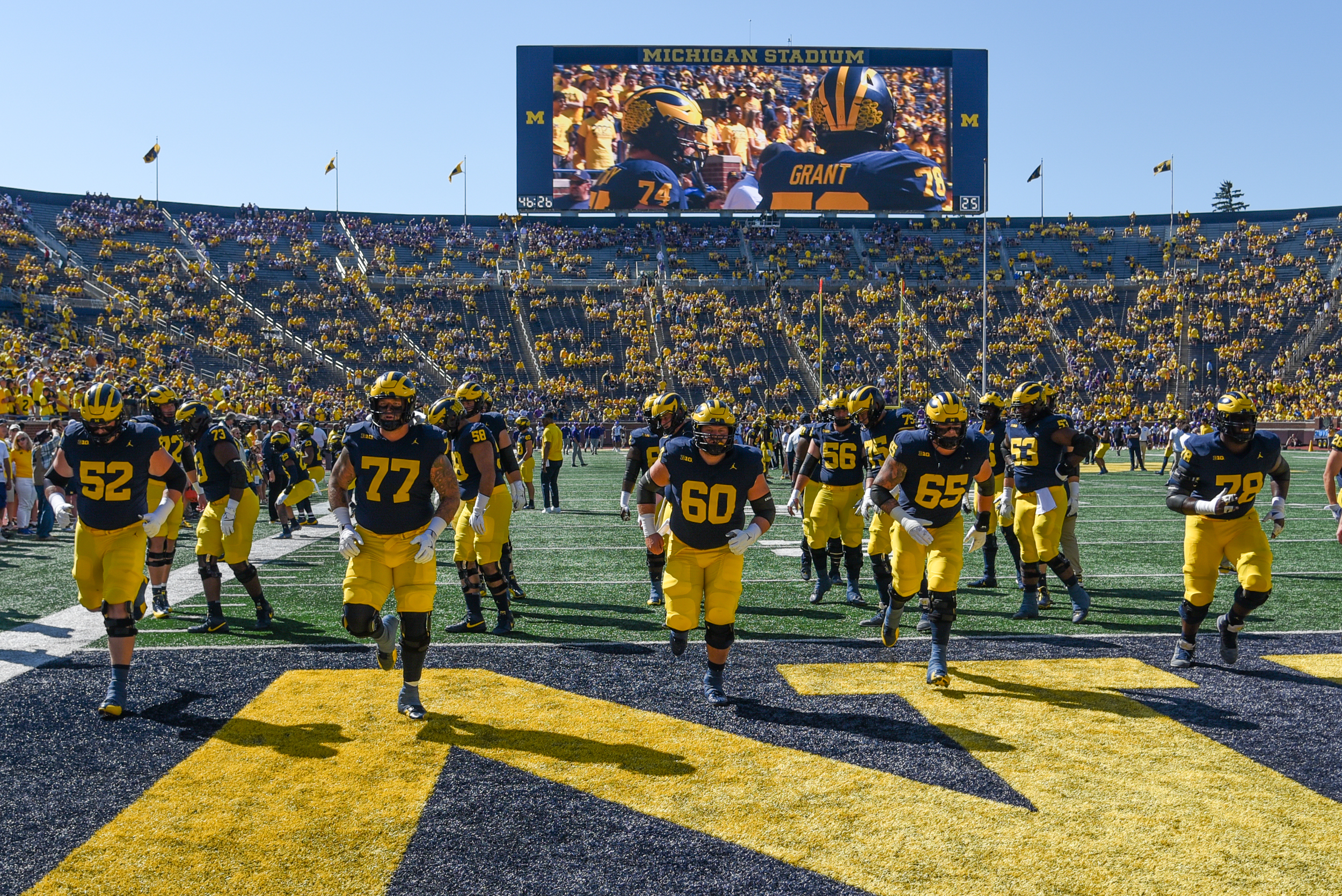
Michigan won the national championship in 2023 with a BCR of 54%

Sixteen teams had a BCR of 50% or higher during the 2023 season.

- Alabama – 90%
- Ohio State – 85%
- Georgia – 77%
- Texas A&M – 73%
- Clemson – 72%
- LSU – 71%
- Texas – 70%
- Oklahoma – 70%
- Oregon – 67%
- Notre Dame – 65%
- Florida – 64%
- Miami – 61%
- Penn State – 55%
- **Michigan – 54%**
- USC – 52%
- Auburn – 51%

==== 2024 ====
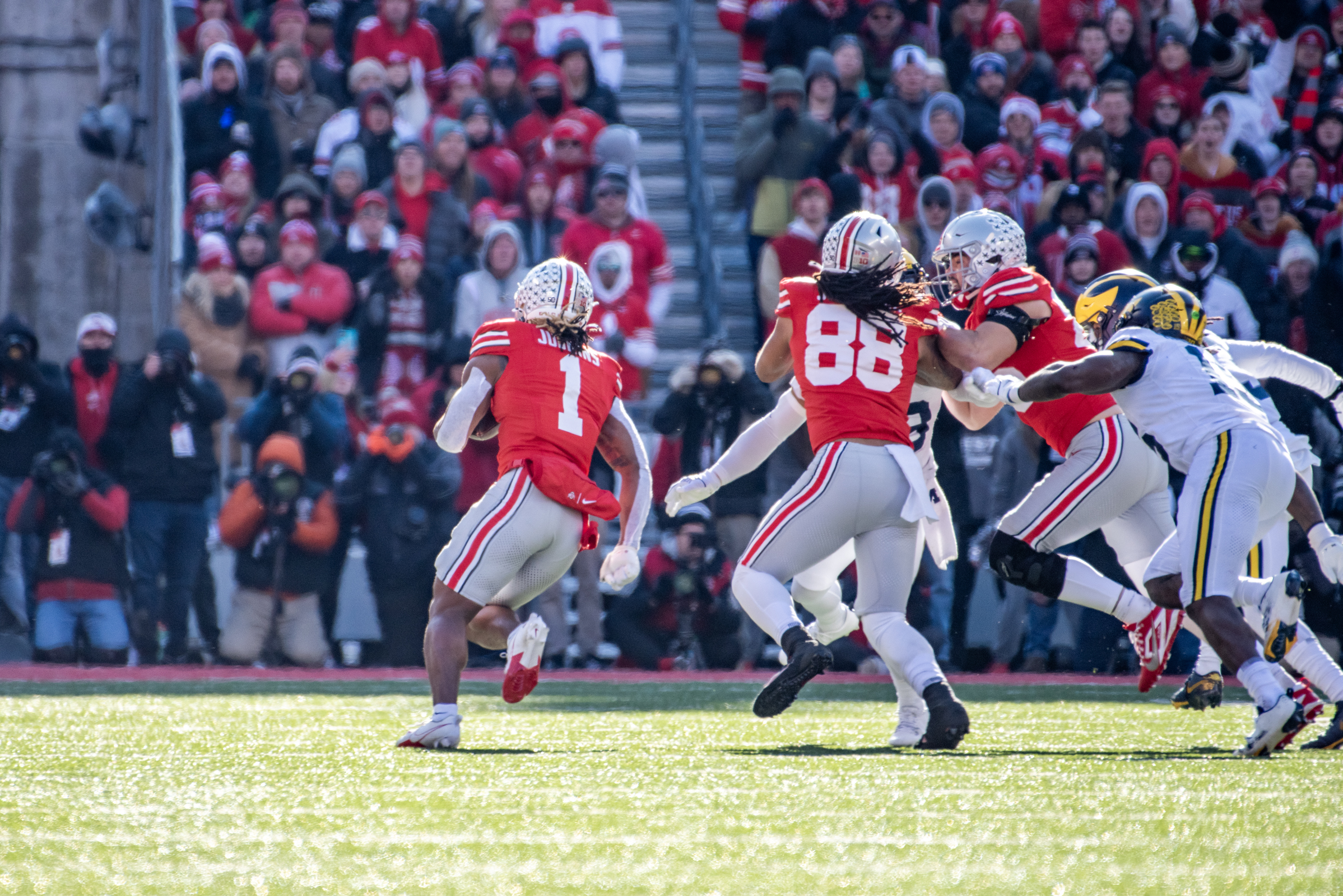
Ohio State won the national championship in 2024 with a BCR of 90%

Sixteen teams had a BCR of 50% or higher during the 2024 season.

- **Ohio State – 90%**
- Alabama – 88%
- Georgia – 80%
- Texas A&M – 79%
- Oregon – 76%
- Oklahoma – 73%
- Texas – 72%
- LSU – 70%
- Notre Dame – 67%
- Clemson – 64%
- Florida – 63%
- Miami – 61%
- Penn State – 61%
- USC – 59%
- Michigan – 56%
- Auburn – 53%

==== 2025 ====
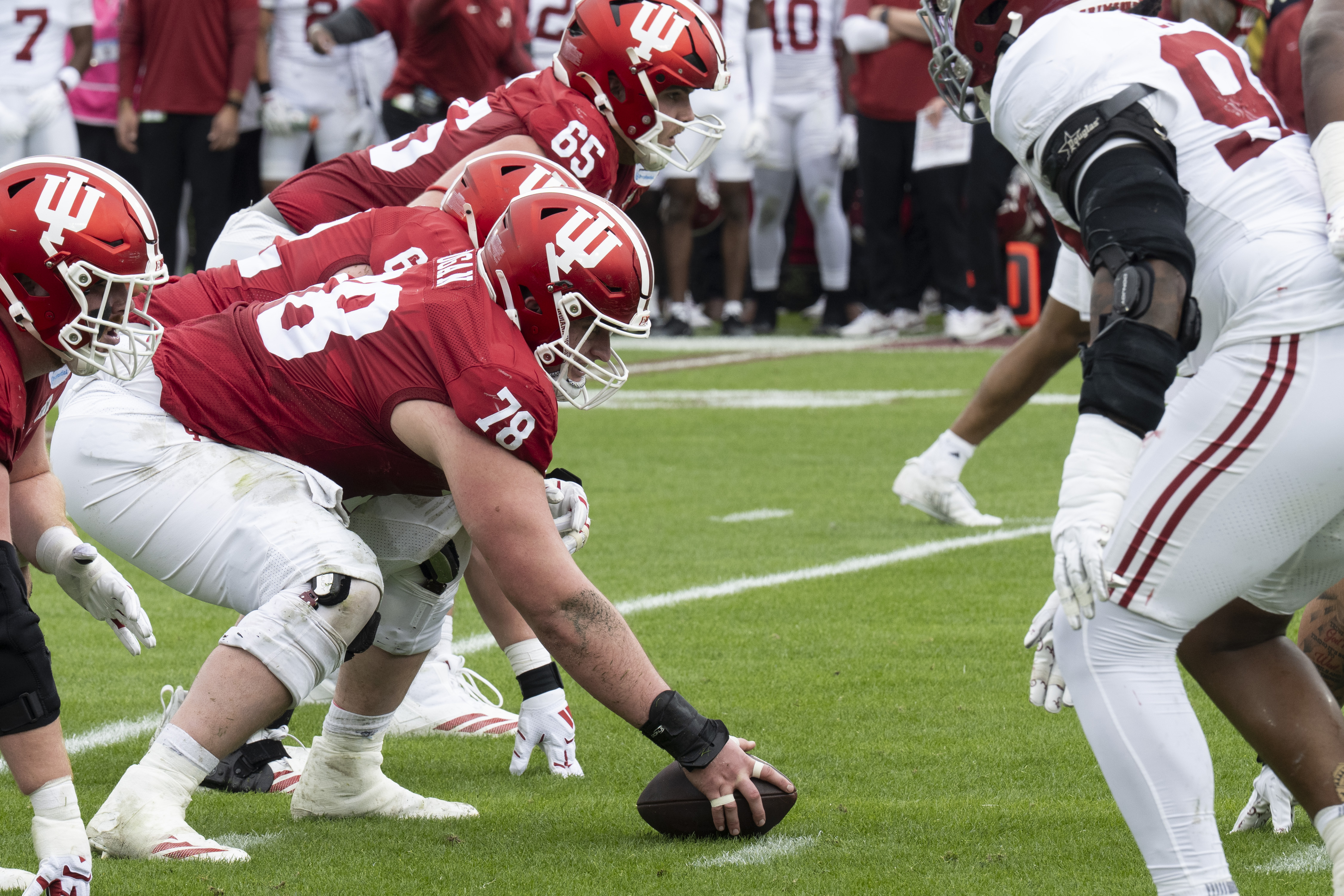
Indiana won the national championship in 2025 despite having a BCR less than 50%

Eighteen teams had a BCR of 50% or higher during the 2025 season. However, Indiana won the national championship.

- Alabama – 89%
- Ohio State – 89%
- Georgia – 84%
- Texas A&M – 82%
- Oregon – 78%
- Texas – 78%
- LSU – 73%
- Notre Dame – 73%
- Oklahoma – 70%
- Penn State – 68%
- Miami – 64%
- Florida – 64%
- Auburn – 64%
- Michigan – 57%
- USC – 57%
- Clemson – 55%
- Tennessee – 54%
- Florida State – 54%

== See also ==
- Recruiting (college athletics)
- Draft bust
