= Jacques Patrick =

American football player (born 1997)

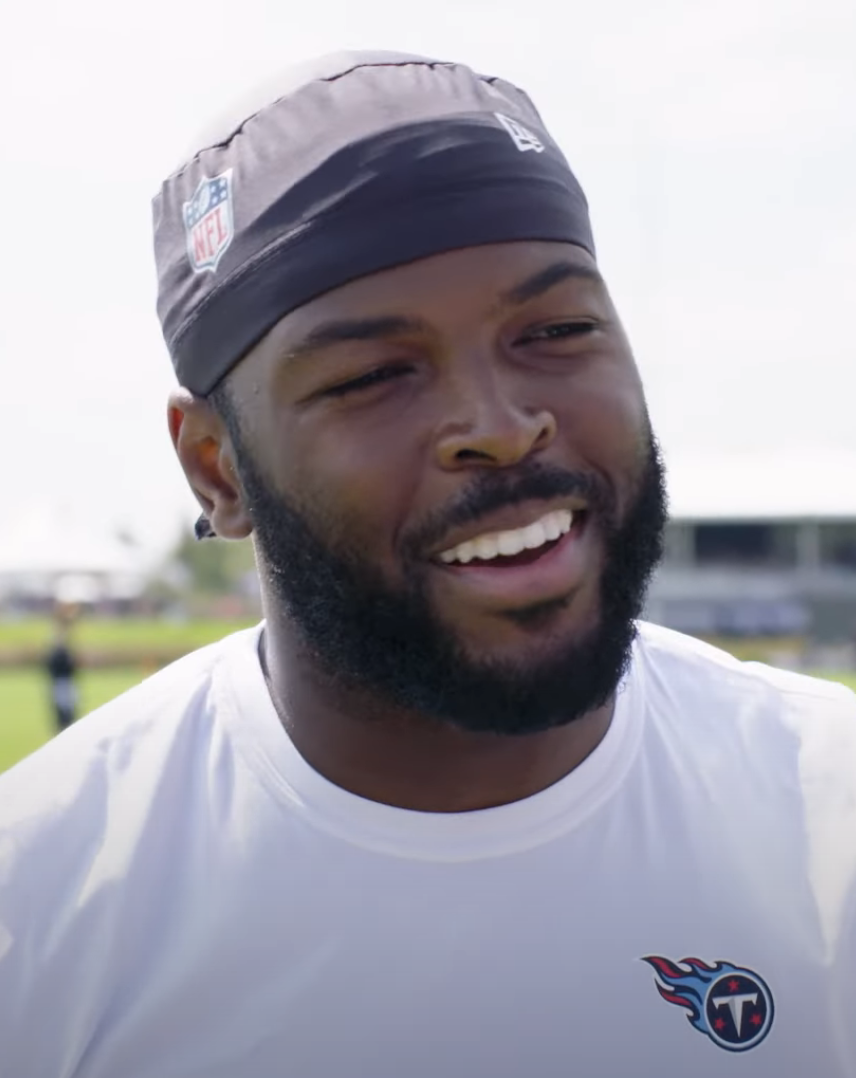
- Patrick with the Tennessee Titans in 2023

Profile
- Position: Running back

Personal information
- Born: January 7, 1997 (age 29); Orlando, Florida, U.S.
- Listed height: 6 ft 2 in (1.88 m)
- Listed weight: 234 lb (106 kg)

Career information
- High school: Timber Creek (Orlando, Florida)
- College: Florida State
- NFL draft: 2019: undrafted

Career history
- Tampa Bay Vipers (2020); Cincinnati Bengals (2020–2021)*; San Francisco 49ers (2021); Carolina Panthers (2021)*; Baltimore Ravens (2021)*; Cincinnati Bengals (2022)*; San Antonio Brahmas (2023); Denver Broncos (2023)*; Tennessee Titans (2023)*; New York Jets (2023–2024)*
- * Offseason or practice squad member only

Career NFL statistics as of 2023
- Rushing yards: 12
- Rushing average: 6
- Stats at Pro Football Reference

Jacques Patrick (born January 7, 1997) is an American football running back. He played college football for the Florida State Seminoles.

== College career ==
After playing high school football at Timber Creek High School in Orlando, Florida, Patrick committed to Florida State over offers from Ohio State, Alabama, Texas A&M, and Arizona, among others. Patrick spent the 2015 and 2016 seasons as the backup to Dalvin Cook. In 2017, Patrick shared carries with freshman Cam Akers. In 2017, Patrick had 118 rushing attempts for 638 yards and 6 touchdowns, averaging 5.8 yards per rush with his season long being 68 yards. During a game against Louisville during the 2017 season, Patrick suffered an injury to his knee. He would return later in the season to play Clemson. On January 10, 2018, Patrick announced he would return for his senior season at FSU and not declare early for the 2018 NFL draft.

=== Statistics ===
College football statistics
Season	Team	Class	Rushing				Receiving				Scrimmage			
Season	Team	Class	Att	Yds	Avg	TD	Rec	Yds	Avg	TD	Plays	Yds	Avg	TD
2015	Florida State	FR	63	314	5.0	5	6	62	10.3	0	69	376	5.4	5
2016	Florida State	SO	61	350	5.7	4	4	21	5.3	0	65	371	5.7	4
2017	Florida State	JR	134	748	5.6	7	21	171	8.1	0	155	919	5.9	7
2018	Florida State	SR	108	378	3.5	1	16	102	6.4	1	124	480	3.9	2
Career			366	1790	4.9	17	47	356	7.6	1	413	2146	5.2	18

== Professional career ==
Pre-draft measurables
Height	Weight	Arm length	Hand span	40-yard dash	10-yard split	20-yard split	20-yard shuttle	Three-cone drill	Vertical jump	Broad jump	Bench press
6 ft 2 in (1.88 m)	226 lb (103 kg)	32 1/2 in (0.83 m)	9 7/8 in (0.25 m)	4.69 s	1.65 s	2.69 s	4.52 s	7.42 s	30.0 in (0.76 m)	9 ft 8 in (2.95 m)	17 reps
All values from Pro Day

=== Tampa Bay Vipers ===
Patrick was drafted by the Tampa Bay Vipers during the 2020 XFL draft. He had his contract terminated when the league suspended operations on April 10, 2020.

=== Cincinnati Bengals (first stint) ===
Patrick signed with the Cincinnati Bengals of the NFL on April 17, 2020. He was waived on September 5, and signed to the practice squad the next day. He signed a reserve/future contract on January 4, 2021.

On August 31, 2021, Patrick was waived by the Bengals and re-signed to the practice squad the next day.

=== San Francisco 49ers ===
On September 21, 2021, Patrick was signed by the San Francisco 49ers off the Bengals practice squad. He was waived on October 12, and re-signed to the practice squad six days later. Patrick was released on November 2.

=== Carolina Panthers ===
On December 7, 2021, Patrick was signed to the Carolina Panthers' practice squad. He was released on December 21.

=== Baltimore Ravens ===
On January 4, 2022, Patrick was signed to the Baltimore Ravens practice squad.

=== Cincinnati Bengals (second stint) ===
On July 28, 2022, Patrick was signed by the Cincinnati Bengals for a second time. He was waived on August 30.

=== San Antonio Brahmas ===
On November 17, 2022, Patrick was drafted by the San Antonio Brahmas of the XFL. He was released from his contract on May 15, 2023.

=== Denver Broncos ===
On May 15, 2023, Patrick signed with the Denver Broncos. He was waived on June 1.

=== Tennessee Titans ===
On August 14, 2023, Patrick signed with the Tennessee Titans. He was waived on August 29. On September 14, the Titans re-signed Patrick to their practice squad. He was released on October 24.

=== New York Jets ===
On December 19, 2023, Patrick was signed to the New York Jets' practice squad. He signed a reserve/future contract with New York on January 8, 2024. He was waived on May 13.

== Personal life ==
His younger brother Peter Hayes received scholarship offers from FSU and Ohio State in 2014 while still in the eighth grade.
