= James Blackman =

American football player (born 1998)

No. 5 – Orlando Pirates
- Position: Quarterback

Personal information
- Born: November 14, 1998 (age 27); Belle Glade, Florida, U.S.
- Listed height: 6 ft 5 in (1.96 m)
- Listed weight: 190 lb (86 kg)

Career information
- High school: Glades Central (FL)
- College: Florida State (2017–2020); Arkansas State (2021–2022)
- NFL draft: 2023: undrafted

Career history
- Miami Dolphins (2023)*; Orlando Pirates (2026–present)
- * Offseason or practice squad member only
- Stats at Pro Football Reference

James Blackman (born November 14, 1998) is an American football quarterback for the Orlando Pirates of the Indoor Football League (IFL). He played college football for the Florida State Seminoles and Arkansas State. He was signed by the Miami Dolphins as an undrafted free agent following the 2023 NFL draft.

== Early life ==
Blackman played high school football at Glades Central High School in Belle Glade, Florida.

== College career ==
Blackman committed to Florida State over offers from West Virginia and Louisville. He became the starting quarterback after Deondre Francois suffered a season-ending injury during the season opener against Alabama. Blackman became the first true freshman starting quarterback at FSU since Chip Ferguson in 1985. Despite the Seminoles being down 2–5 at one point in the season, Blackman was able to lead the team to a 6–6 record and an appearance in the 2017 Independence Bowl against Southern Mississippi. During the game, he threw four touchdown passes (three to Auden Tate and one to Cam Akers), setting an Independence Bowl record and netted the Offensive MVP.

On November 11, 2020, head coach Mike Norvell announced James Blackman was no longer with the team and was looking to transfer. He transferred to Arkansas State in January 2021.

=== Statistics ===
Season	Team	Games			Passing								Rushing			
Season	Team	GP	GS	Record	Cmp	Att	Pct	Yds	Y/A	TD	Int	Rtg	Att	Yds	Avg	TD
2017	Florida State	13	12	7–5	173	297	58.2	2,230	7.5	19	11	135.0	65	−36	−0.6	0
2018	Florida State	4	1	0–1	33	51	64.7	510	10.0	5	1	177.1	11	−26	−2.4	0
2019	Florida State	12	10	4–6	184	292	63.0	2,339	8.0	17	11	142.0	68	41	0.6	1
2020	Florida State	4	2	0–2	43	76	56.6	366	4.8	2	3	97.8	18	−11	−0.6	0
2021	Arkansas State	6	5	1–4	109	183	59.6	1,344	7.3	8	4	131.3	32	−39	−1.2	0
2022	Arkansas State	11	11	3–8	223	347	64.3	2,471	7.1	14	3	135.7	61	−120	−2.0	3
Career		50	41	15–26	765	1,246	61.4	9,260	7.4	65	33	135.7	255	-191	-0.7	4

== Professional career ==
Pre-draft measurables
Height	Weight	Arm length	Hand span	40-yard dash	10-yard split	20-yard split	20-yard shuttle	Three-cone drill	Vertical jump	Broad jump
6 ft 5 1/4 in (1.96 m)	189 lb (86 kg)	33 in (0.84 m)	9 1/2 in (0.24 m)	4.75 s	1.63 s	2.63 s	4.66 s	7.40 s	30.5 in (0.77 m)	9 ft 9 in (2.97 m)
All values from Pro Day

=== Miami Dolphins ===
On April 29, 2023, Blackman signed with the Miami Dolphins as an undrafted free agent. He was waived by the Dolphins on August 7. Blackman was re-signed by the Dolphins on August 21. Blackman was then waived again as a part of final roster cuts on August 28.

=== Orlando Pirates ===
On April 2, 2026, Blackman signed with the Orlando Pirates of the Indoor Football League (IFL).
