= Telly Lockette =

American football coach (born 1974)

Current position
- Title: Running backs coach
- Team: Memphis
- Conference: American

Biographical details
- Born: March 2, 1974 (age 52); Miami, Florida, U.S.

Playing career
- 1993–1997: Idaho State
- Position: Linebacker

Coaching career (HC unless noted)
- 2003–2006: Miami Northwestern HS (FL) (OC/RB)
- 2008–2012: Miami Central HS (FL)
- 2012–2014: South Florida (RB)
- 2015–2017: Oregon State (RB)
- 2018–2019: Florida State (TE)
- 2020: Miami (FL) (analyst)
- 2021–2023: Marshall (RGC/RB)
- 2024: Marshall (Assoc. HC/RB)
- 2024: Marshall (interim HC)
- 2025: Southern Miss (RB)
- 2026–present: Memphis (AHC/RB)

Head coaching record
- Overall: 60–10 (high school)

Telly Lockette (born March 2, 1974) is an American football coach who is the running backs coach for the Memphis Tigers.

== College years ==
Lockette played college football at Idaho State from 1993 to 1997. At Idaho State, he was twice named All-Big Sky playing at linebacker. In 2013, he was inducted into the Idaho State Athletics Hall of Fame.

== Coaching career ==
Lockette got his start in college coaching as running backs coach at South Florida 2012 after winning two 6A Championships as head coach at Miami Central Senior High School in Florida. In 2015, he accepted the same position at Oregon State under Gary Andersen. Lockette was hired as tight ends coach for Florida State in 2018, reuniting him with head coach Willie Taggart whom he previously coached under at South Florida.

In 2021, Lockette was hired by head coach, Charles Huff, to be the running backs coach at Marshall. Prior to the 2024 season, he was promoted to associate head for the Thundering Herd. On December 8, 2024, Lockette was named interim head coach of the Thundering Herd following the departure of head coach Charles Huff to Southern Miss after the Sun Belt Championship Game. The Thundering Herd were due to play Army in the Independence Bowl, but they withdrew from that game after two dozen players entered the transfer portal due to Huff's departure. As a result, Lockette never coached a practice or game for the Thundering Herd.

In January 2025, Lockette followed Coach Huff to Southern Miss as the running backs coach.

== Head coaching record ==
=== College ===
Year	Team	Overall	Conference	Standing	Bowl/playoffs
Marshall Thundering Herd (Sun Belt Conference) (2024)
2024	Marshall	0–0			Independence (Note: Marshall withdrew from the bowl game after losing over two dozen players to the transfer portal.)
Marshall:		0–0			
Total:		0–0			
