= Cam Akers =

American football player (born 1999)

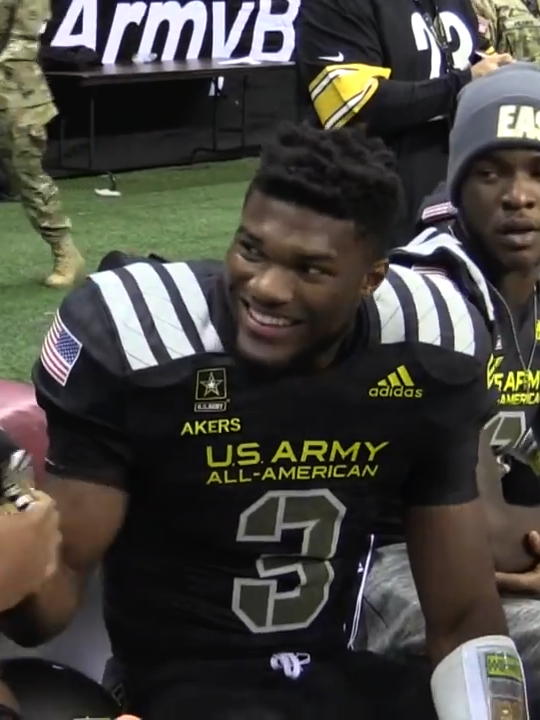
- Akers at the 2017 All-American Bowl

Profile
- Position: Running back

Personal information
- Born: June 22, 1999 (age 27); Jackson, Mississippi, U.S.
- Listed height: 5 ft 10 in (1.78 m)
- Listed weight: 217 lb (98 kg)

Career information
- High school: Clinton (Clinton, Mississippi)
- College: Florida State (2017–2019)
- NFL draft: 2020: 2nd round, 52nd overall pick

Career history
- Los Angeles Rams (2020–2023); Minnesota Vikings (2023); Houston Texans (2024); Minnesota Vikings (2024); New Orleans Saints (2025)*; Minnesota Vikings (2025); Seattle Seahawks (2025)
- * Offseason or practice squad member only

Awards and highlights
- 2× Super Bowl champion (LVI, LX); Second-team All-ACC (2019); Third-team All-ACC (2017)

Career NFL statistics as of 2025
- Rushing yards: 2,044
- Rushing average: 4.0
- Rushing touchdowns: 13
- Receptions: 52
- Receiving yards: 388
- Receiving touchdowns: 4
- Stats at Pro Football Reference

Cam Akers (born June 22, 1999) is an American professional football running back. He played college football for the Florida State Seminoles. Akers was selected by the Los Angeles Rams in the second round of the 2020 NFL draft. He spent four seasons with the team, including the 2021 season where he tore his Achilles tendon but returned for the postseason and was a part of the Super Bowl LVI championship team. In 2023, he was traded to the Minnesota Vikings, where another Achilles injury prematurely ended his season. He has also played for the Houston Texans and the Seattle Seahawks, where he was a part of the latter's Super Bowl LX championship team.

== Early life ==
Akers attended Clinton High School in Clinton, Mississippi, where he played quarterback and running back for the football team. As a senior, he rushed for 2,105 yards and 34 touchdowns, and passed for 3,128 passing yards and 31 touchdowns. For his high school career, he had 13,243 yards and 149 touchdowns. Akers was named Mississippi Gatorade Player of The Year. He also played in the U.S. Army All-American Bowl and won the U.S. Army Player of the Year Award in 2016.

College recruiting
Name	Hometown	School	Height	Weight	40^{‡}	Commit date
Cam Akers; RB	Clinton, MS	Clinton (MS)	5 ft 11 in (1.80 m)	213 lb (97 kg)	4.41	Dec 27, 2016
Cam Akers; RB	Recruit ratings: Rivals: 247Sports: ESPN:					
Overall recruit ranking: Rivals: 2 (RB) 247Sports: 1 (RB) ESPN: 1 (RB)
Note: In many cases, Scout, Rivals, 247Sports, On3, and ESPN may conflict in their listings of height and weight.; In these cases, the average was taken. ESPN grades are on a 100-point scale.; Sources: "Florida State Football Commitments". Rivals.; "ESPN". ESPN.; "2017 Team Ranking". Rivals.com.

Akers was rated as a five-star recruit and was ranked among the top recruits in his class. He committed to Florida State University to play college football.

== College career ==
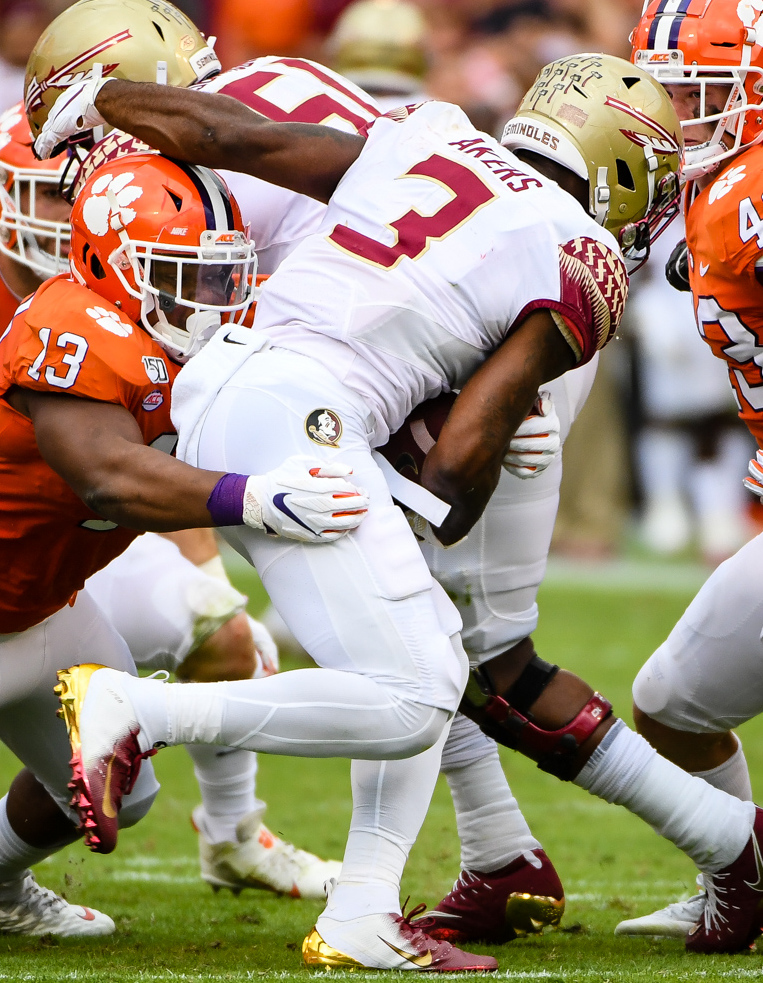
Akers with Florida State in 2019

=== 2017 season ===
Florida State began the season against Alabama in the Chick-fil-a Kickoff Game. Akers rushed for 30 yards on 10 attempts in his college debut. They would lose, 24–7. Akers's first 100-yard game came against Miami (FL), where he rushed for 129 yards on 14 carries in a 24–20 loss. Against Duke a week later, Akers scored his first college touchdown on a 46-yard touchdown run to beat the Blue Devils, 17–10. In a game against Syracuse, Akers rushed for 199 yards on 22 carries and two touchdowns. Against Louisiana–Monroe in the final regular season game, Akers rushed for 117 yards on 19 carries and two touchdowns. After the 2017 Independence Bowl, Akers totals on the season went to 194 attempts for 1,025 yards and seven touchdowns. He also had 16 receptions for 116 yards and a touchdown. His rushing total broke the FSU freshman record previously held by Dalvin Cook in 2014 when he rushed for 1,008 yards. Akers was named Third-Team All-Atlantic Coast Conference (ACC) at the end of the season.

=== 2018 season ===
Akers was again the starter for the 2018 season. He was also named Preseason All-ACC. Akers didn't have a very good season, not having a 100-yard performance until second to last game of the season against Boston College, where he rushed for 110 yards on 14 carries and a touchdown. Akers finished the season with 706 yards on 161 attempts and six touchdowns as well as 23 receptions for 145 yards and two touchdowns.

=== 2019 season ===
In Florida State's second game of the season, Akers rushed for 193 yards on 36 carries and a pair of touchdowns. He also had five receptions for 55 yards and a touchdown in their 45–44 win over Louisiana–Monroe. His 36 carries was a program record. Against Louisville, Akers had 112 rushing yards and three rushing touchdowns in a 35–24 win. Against Wake Forest, Akers carried the ball 30 times for 157 yards and a touchdown as well as four receptions for 42 yards and another touchdown. A week later against Syracuse, Akers had 20 carries for 144 yards and four touchdowns to rout the Orange, 35–17. His four touchdowns tied the program record. In Akers final game against Florida, he had 17 rush attempts for 102 yards and a touchdown in a 40–17 loss.

On December 14, 2019, Akers announced he would be skipping the Sun Bowl to enter the 2020 NFL draft. Akers finished his season tied for seventh in single-season touchdown carries with 14 and seventh in career rushing touchdowns with 27. His 1,144 yards were ranked sixth for a single-season and his 2,875 career rushing yards rank sixth in program history. He was also named Second-Team All-ACC at the end of the season.

== Professional career ==
=== Pre-draft ===
Pre-draft measurables
Height	Weight	Arm length	Hand span	Wingspan	40-yard dash	10-yard split	20-yard split	20-yard shuttle	Vertical jump	Broad jump	Bench press
5 ft 10 3/8 in (1.79 m)	217 lb (98 kg)	30 5/8 in (0.78 m)	9 in (0.23 m)	6 ft 2 5/8 in (1.90 m)	4.47 s	1.47 s	2.62 s	4.42 s	35.5 in (0.90 m)	10 ft 2 in (3.10 m)	20 reps
All values from NFL Combine

Akers was considered the sixth-best running back to enter the 2020 NFL draft and was a projected second-round pick.

=== Los Angeles Rams ===
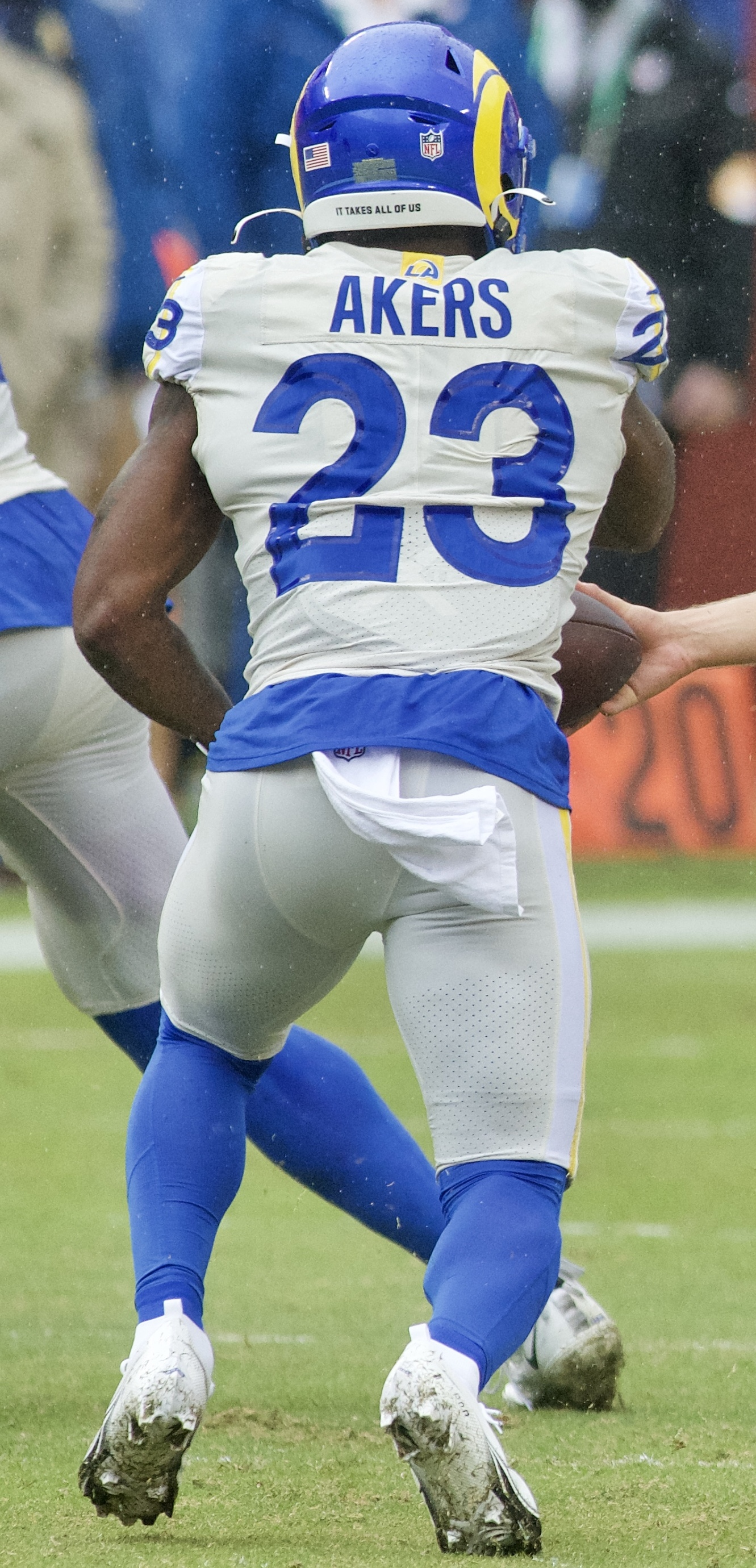
Akers with the Rams in 2020

==== 2020 season ====
Akers was selected by the Los Angeles Rams in the second round, 52nd overall, in the 2020 NFL Draft.

In Week 11 against the Tampa Bay Buccaneers, Akers scored his first career touchdown on a four-yard reception in the third quarter in a 27–24 victory. In Week 14 against the New England Patriots, Akers rushed for 171 yards on 29 attempts which marked the sixth-most rushing yards by any NFL player in a single game during the 2020 season and fourth-most by a Rams rookie in a single game in franchise history. The Rams won the game by a score of 24–3. Akers was named the NFC Offensive Player of the Week for his performance in Week 14.

In the Wild Card Round of the NFL playoffs against the Seattle Seahawks, Akers rushed for 131 yards and a touchdown and caught 2 passes for 45 yards during the 30–20 win. In the Divisional Round of the playoffs against the Green Bay Packers, Akers rushed for 90 yards and a touchdown during the 32–18 loss.

==== 2021 season ====
On July 20, 2021, Akers tore his Achilles tendon while working out shortly before the start of training camp. Akers was expected to be sidelined for the entire 2021 season, as he was placed on the reserve/non-football injury list to start the season. However, he was one of the first players to receive the SpeedBridge surgery, shortening his recovery time from 12 months to five months, and was activated to the active roster on December 25, 2021. Akers returned to action in Week 18 against the San Francisco 49ers. In the Super Bowl, Akers had 13 carries for 21 rushing yards and three receptions for 14 receiving yards in the Rams 23–20 victory against the Cincinnati Bengals.

==== 2022 season ====
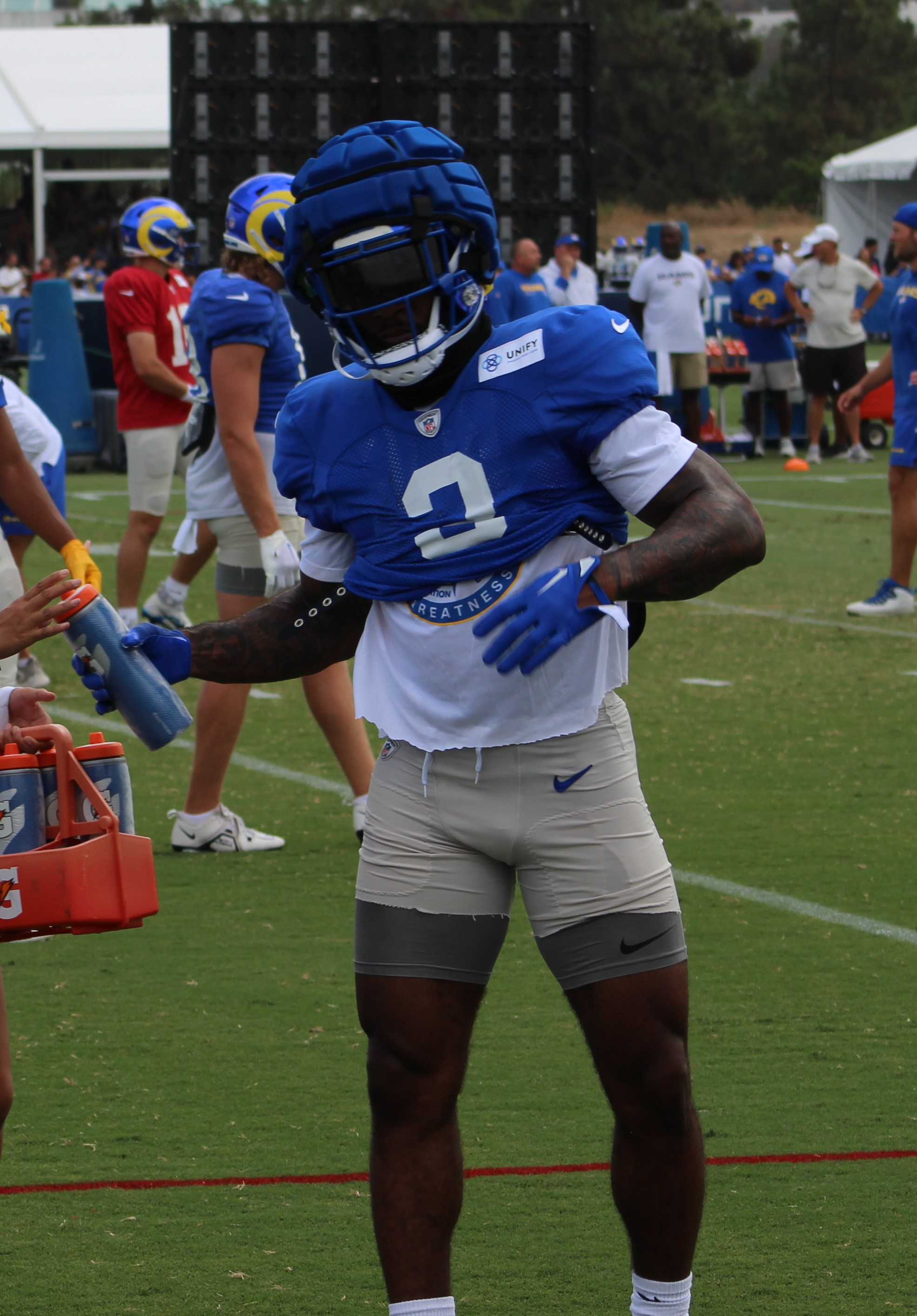
Akers at training camp in 2023

Akers was expected to start Week 1 but ended up only getting three rushing attempts for three yards. Akers requested a trade from the Rams after Week 5 and did not play in the Rams' next two games. Akers returned to practice on November 3 and later denied requesting a trade.

Against the Denver Broncos in Week 16, Akers rushed for 118 yards and three touchdowns in the 51–14 win. He rushed for 123 yards on 19 carries against the Los Angeles Chargers in Week 17 and 104 yards on 21 carries against the Seahawks in Week 18 and three catches for 24 receiving yards, finishing the season with three consecutive 100-yard rushing games. He finished the 2022 season with 188 carries for 786 rushing yards and seven rushing touchdowns to go along with 13 receptions for 117 receiving yards in 15 games and nine starts.

==== 2023 season ====
Akers began the season as the Rams' starting running back in Week 1 at the Seahawks. He carried the ball 22 times for 29 yards and scored on a 1-yard touchdown run in the fourth quarter of Los Angeles's 30–13 season-opening win. For unspecified reasons, Akers was inactive before the Week 2 game against the 49ers, with Kyren Williams making the start at running back.

=== Minnesota Vikings (first stint) ===
On September 21, 2023, the Rams traded Akers and a conditional 2026 seventh-round draft pick to the Minnesota Vikings in exchange for a conditional 2026 sixth-round pick. Akers was announced as inactive for Week 3. In his Vikings debut against the Carolina Panthers, Akers rushed for 40 yards on five attempts as well as two catches for 11 yards. The Vikings would win, 21–13. But, in Week 9 against the Atlanta Falcons, Akers suffered an injury to his left Achilles. He was placed on the injured reserve list on November 8, 2023.

=== Houston Texans ===
On July 21, 2024, Akers signed with the Houston Texans.

=== Minnesota Vikings (second stint) ===
On October 15, 2024, the Texans traded Akers and a 2026 conditional seventh-round draft pick to the Vikings in exchange for a conditional 2026 sixth-round pick. He finished the 2024 season with 104 carries for 444 rushing yards and two rushing touchdowns to go with 14 receptions for 68 receiving yards and three receiving touchdowns.

=== New Orleans Saints ===
On June 13, 2025, Akers signed with the New Orleans Saints. On August 25, Akers was released by the Saints.

=== Minnesota Vikings (third stint) ===
On September 17, 2025, the Minnesota Vikings signed Akers to their practice squad.

On October 4, Akers was elevated to the Vikings active roster prior to a Week 5 matchup against the Cleveland Browns in London on October 5. In the game, Akers threw a 32-yard touchdown pass to tight end Josh Oliver as the Vikings won 21–17. Akers was moved back to the practice squad the day following the game. On November 22, he was released.

=== Seattle Seahawks ===
On November 26, 2025, Akers signed with the Seattle Seahawks. He was waived on December 11, but signed with their practice squad two days later. The Seahawks went on to win Super Bowl LX over the New England Patriots, giving Akers his second Super Bowl championship. On February 12, 2026, he signed a reserve/futures contract with the Seahawks.

On April 27, 2026, Akers was released by the Seahawks.

== Career statistics ==
=== NFL ===
Legend
	Won the Super Bowl
**Bold**	Career high

==== Regular season ====
Year	Team	Games		Rushing					Receiving					Fumbles	
Year	Team	GP	GS	Att	Yds	Avg	Lng	TD	Rec	Yds	Avg	Lng	TD	Fum	Lost
2020	LAR	13	5	145	625	4.3	**61**	2	11	**123**	**11.2**	**38**	1	1	1
2021	LAR	1	0	5	3	0.6	2	0	3	10	3.3	6	0	0	–
2022	LAR	15	9	**188**	**786**	4.2	42	**9**	**13**	117	9.0	10	0	**2**	**2**
2023	LAR	1	1	22	29	1.3	12	1	0	—	—	—	—	0	–
2023	MIN	6	0	38	138	3.6	19	1	11	70	6.4	30	0	0	–
2024	HOU	5	2	40	147	3.7	15	1	4	16	4.0	8	1	1	1
2024	MIN	12	0	64	297	**4.6**	58	1	10	52	5.2	9	**2**	0	–
2025	MIN	3	0	5	19	3.8	14	0	0	–	–	–	–	0	–
2025	SEA	3	0	0	–	–	–	–	0	–	–	–	–	0	–
Career		59	17	507	2,044	4.0	61	13	52	388	7.5	38	4	4	4

==== Postseason ====
Year	Team	Games		Rushing					Receiving				
Year	Team	GP	GS	Att	Yds	Avg	Lng	TD	Rec	Yds	Avg	Lng	TD
2020	LAR	2	2	46	**221**	4.8	20	**2**	3	51	**17.0**	**44**	0
2021	LAR	4	3	**67**	172	2.6	15	0	**8**	**76**	9.5	40	0
2024	MIN	1	0	5	39	**7.8**	**26**	0	0	–	–	–	–
2025	SEA	1	0	0	–	–	–	–	0	–	–	–	–
Career		8	5	118	432	3.7	26	2	11	127	11.5	44	0

=== College ===
Year	Team	GP	Rushing				Receiving			
Year	Team	GP	Att	Yds	Avg	TD	Rec	Yds	Avg	TD
2017	Florida State	**13**	194	1,025	**5.3**	7	16	116	7.3	1
2018	Florida State	12	161	706	4.4	6	23	145	6.3	2
2019	Florida State	11	**231**	**1,144**	5.0	**14**	**30**	**225**	**7.5**	**4**
Career		36	586	2,875	4.9	27	69	486	7.0	7
