= Levonta Taylor =

American football player (born 1997)

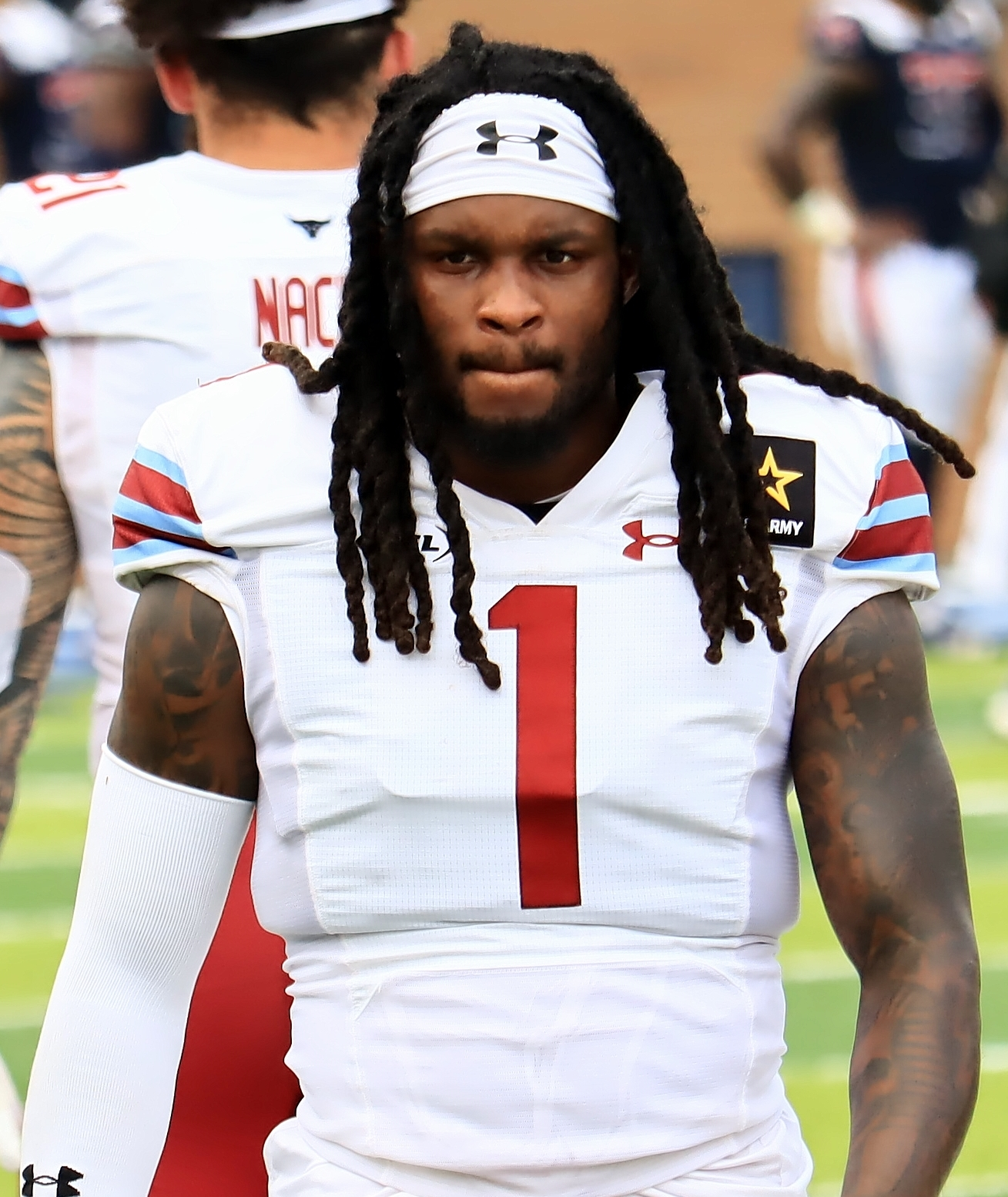
- Taylor with the Michigan Panthers in 2024

Profile
- Position: Cornerback

Personal information
- Born: November 4, 1997 (age 29)
- Listed height: 5 ft 10 in (1.78 m)
- Listed weight: 186 lb (84 kg)

Career information
- High school: Virginia Beach (VA) Ocean Lakes
- College: Florida State
- NFL draft: 2020: undrafted

Career history
- Los Angeles Rams (2020)*; TSL Sea Lions (2021); Saskatchewan Roughriders (2022)*; Michigan Panthers (2023–2025)
- * Offseason or practice squad member only

Levonta Taylor (born November 4, 1997) is an American professional football cornerback. He played college football at Florida State.

== Early life ==
After high school, Taylor was ranked as the number 1 cornerback in the country by 247 sports.

== College career ==
Despite dealing with injuries, Taylor was still able to appear in 12 games for Florida State as a true freshman. During his sophomore season, in a game against Louisiana-Monroe, Taylor had his first two interceptions of his career.

== Professional career ==
Pre-draft measurables
Height	Weight	Arm length	Hand span
5 ft 9 1/4 in (1.76 m)	190 lb (86 kg)	29 1/2 in (0.75 m)	8 in (0.20 m)
All values from Pro Day

=== Los Angeles Rams ===
Taylor signed with the Los Angeles Rams as an undrafted free agent on April 25, 2020. He was waived on August 11, 2020.

=== Saskatchewan Roughriders ===
Taylor signed with the Saskatchewan Roughriders of the Canadian Football League on April 27, 2022, but was released on June 2.

=== Michigan Panthers ===
On January 5, 2023, Taylor signed with the Michigan Panthers of the United States Football League (USFL). He re-signed with the team on August 26, 2024. He was placed on injured reserve on May 6, 2025.
