= Tamorrion Terry =

American football player (born 1998)

Quad City Steamwheelers
- Position: Wide receiver
- Roster status: Active

Personal information
- Born: March 21, 1998 (age 28); Ashburn, Georgia, U.S.
- Listed height: 6 ft 3 in (1.91 m)
- Listed weight: 207 lb (94 kg)

Career information
- High school: Turner County (Ashburn)
- College: Florida State
- NFL draft: 2021: undrafted

Career history
- Seattle Seahawks (2021)*; Jacksonville Sharks (2023–2024); Duke City Gladiators (2024); Vegas Knight Hawks (2025); Quad City Steamwheelers (2025–present)
- * Offseason or practice squad member only

Awards and highlights
- NAL Champion (2023); Second-team All-ACC (2019)
- Stats at Pro Football Reference

Tamorrion Terry (born March 21, 1998) is an American professional football wide receiver for the Quad City Steamwheelers of the Indoor Football League (IFL). He played college football for the Florida State Seminoles.

== Early life ==
Terry attended Turner County High School in Ashburn, Georgia. He committed to Florida State University to play college football.

== College career ==
After redshirting his first year at Florida State in 2017, Terry played in 12 games and made 11 starts in 2018. He finished the year with 35 receptions for 744 yards and eight touchdowns. The 744 receiving yards broke the schools freshman record. As a redshirt sophomore in 2019, Terry started all 13 games and led the team with 60 receptions for 1,188 yards and nine touchdowns. Rather than enter the 2020 NFL draft, he returned to Florida State.

== Professional career ==
Pre-draft measurables
Height	Weight	Arm length	Hand span	40-yard dash	10-yard split	20-yard split	20-yard shuttle	Three-cone drill	Vertical jump	Broad jump	Bench press
6 ft 2 3/4 in (1.90 m)	207 lb (94 kg)	33 3/8 in (0.85 m)	9 1/2 in (0.24 m)	4.44 s	1.58 s	2.59 s	4.47 s	7.11 s	32.5 in (0.83 m)	10 ft 6 in (3.20 m)	15 reps
All values from Pro Day

=== Seattle Seahawks ===
Terry signed with the Seattle Seahawks as an undrafted free agent on May 14, 2021. He was waived on June 30.

=== Jacksonville Sharks ===
On April 27, 2023, Terry signed with the Jacksonville Sharks of the National Arena League. After the Sharks announced they were moving to the Indoor Football League, Terry was re-signed on November 4, 2023.

=== Duke City Gladiators ===
On May 21, 2024, Terry was traded to the Duke City Gladiators.

=== Vegas Knight Hawks ===
On December 5, 2024, Terry signed with the Vegas Knight Hawks. In six games with the Knight Hawks, Terry caught 15 passes for 177 yards and five touchdowns. On May 3 against the Northern Arizona Wranglers, Terry caught four passes for 48 yards and three touchdowns.

=== Quad City Steamwheelers ===
Terry joined the Quad City Steamwheelers ahead of the team's Week 12 game. In his first game with the Steamwheelers against the San Antonio Gunslingers, Terry made an instant impact, totaling four receptions for 71 yards, a touchdown and a two-point conversion, in the team's 51–37 win.

== Legal issues ==
Terry was one of 11 people indicted on felony murder charges by a grand jury in Georgia in June 2021, stemming from a gang-related mass shooting outside a nightclub in Ashburn, Georgia, in which seven people were shot and one woman was killed in 2018. The charges were dropped in August 2022.
