= Derrick Kelly II =

American football player (born 1995)

Derrick Kelly
No. 68, 74
- Position: Offensive guard

Personal information
- Born: August 23, 1995 (age 31); Gretna, Florida, U.S.
- Listed height: 6 ft 5 in (1.96 m)
- Listed weight: 320 lb (145 kg)

Career information
- High school: East Gadsden (Havana, Florida)
- College: Florida State (2014–2018)
- NFL draft: 2019: undrafted

Career history
- New Orleans Saints (2019–2021); New York Giants (2021); New York Jets (2022)*; New Orleans Saints (2022)*; San Antonio Brahmas (2023); Cleveland Browns (2023)*; San Antonio Brahmas (2024–2025)
- * Offseason or practice squad member only

Career NFL statistics
- Games played: 7
- Stats at Pro Football Reference

Derrick Kelly II (born August 23, 1995) is an American former professional football player who was an offensive guard in the National Football League (NFL). He played college football for the Florida State Seminoles.

== College career ==
Kelly was a member of the Seminoles at Florida State University for five seasons, redshirting as a true freshman. He played in 34 games with 28 starts over the course of his collegiate career.

== Professional career ==
=== New Orleans Saints (first stint) ===
Kelly was signed by the New Orleans Saints as an undrafted free agent following the 2019 NFL draft on April 27, 2019. He was waived on August 30, 2019, during final roster cuts and was re-signed to the team's practice squad the following day. Kelly signed a reserve/futures contract on January 6, 2020, and made the Saints' active roster coming out of training camp the next season. Kelly made his NFL debut on September 13, 2020, in the season opener against the Tampa Bay Buccaneers. He was placed on the reserve/COVID-19 list by the team on November 29, 2020, and activated on December 9.

On August 31, 2021, Kelly was waived by the Saints and re-signed to the practice squad. He was released on October 12.

=== New York Giants ===
On October 19, 2021, Kelly was signed to the New York Giants practice squad. His contract expired when the teams season ended on January 9, 2022.

=== New York Jets ===
On May 9, 2022, Kelly signed with the New York Jets. He was released on August 16, 2022.

=== New Orleans Saints (second stint) ===
On August 17, 2022, Kelly was claimed off waivers by the New Orleans Saints. He was waived on August 28. He was re-signed to the practice squad on November 10, 2022.

=== San Antonio Brahmas (first stint) ===
Kelly was placed on the reserve list by the San Antonio Brahmas of the XFL on March 7, 2023, and activated on April 7.

=== Cleveland Browns ===
On August 5, 2023, Kelly signed with the Cleveland Browns. On August 27, 2023, Kelly was released by the Browns.

=== San Antonio Brahmas (second stint) ===
On January 19, 2024, Kelly re-signed with the San Antonio Brahmas of the United Football League (UFL). He was placed on injured reserve on April 23, 2024. He was released on June 12, 2024. He was re-signed on August 23.
