= Demarcus Christmas =

American gridiron football player (born 1995)

Profile
- Position: Defensive end

Personal information
- Born: July 4, 1995 (age 31); Bradenton, Florida, U.S.
- Listed height: 6 ft 3 in (1.91 m)
- Listed weight: 302 lb (137 kg)

Career information
- High school: Manatee (Bradenton, Florida)
- College: Florida State (2014–2018)
- NFL draft: 2019: 6th round, 209th overall pick

Career history
- Seattle Seahawks (2019–2020); Pittsburgh Steelers (2020–2021); Saskatchewan Roughriders (2022–2023); Edmonton Elks (2024); Toronto Argonauts (2025)

Awards and highlights
- Third-team All-ACC (2018)
- Stats at Pro Football Reference
- Stats at CFL.ca

Demarcus Christmas (born July 4, 1995) is an American former professional football defensive end. He played college football at Florida State. He was a member of the Seattle Seahawks, Pittsburgh Steelers, Saskatchewan Roughriders, Edmonton Elks, and Toronto Argonauts.

== College career ==
After playing at Manatee High School, Christmas played at Florida State, where he played in 51 games and started 38. He finished his Seminole career with 105 tackles, including 10.5 for loss with 3.5 sacks, 13 pass breakups, two fumble recoveries and one blocked kick. He was named third-team All-Atlantic Coast Conference after his senior season.

== Professional career ==
Pre-draft measurables
Height	Weight	Arm length	Hand span	40-yard dash	10-yard split	20-yard split	20-yard shuttle	Three-cone drill	Vertical jump	Broad jump	Bench press
6 ft 3 3/8 in (1.91 m)	294 lb (133 kg)	32 3/4 in (0.83 m)	9 1/8 in (0.23 m)	5.01 s	1.75 s	2.96 s	4.94 s	7.94 s	26.0 in (0.66 m)	8 ft 9 in (2.67 m)	22 reps

=== Seattle Seahawks ===
Christmas was selected by the Seattle Seahawks in the sixth round (209th overall) of the 2019 NFL draft. He was placed on the reserve/physically unable to perform list on August 31, 2019. On September 5, 2020, Christmas was waived by the Seahawks. He was re-signed to the practice squad on September 17. He was released on October 6. He did not make a regular season appearance for the Seahawks.

=== Pittsburgh Steelers ===
On November 7, 2020, Christmas was signed to the Pittsburgh Steelers practice squad. On January 14, 2021, Christmas signed a reserve/futures contract with the Steelers. He was waived/injured on July 1, 2021, and reverted to team's injured reserve list on July 6. Christmas did not make a regular season appearance for the Steelers.

=== Saskatchewan Roughriders ===
On May 11, 2022, Christmas signed with the Saskatchewan Roughriders of the Canadian Football League (CFL). On February 13, 2024, he became a free agent.

=== Edmonton Elks ===
Christmas was signed to the Edmonton Elks practice roster on July 24, 2024. He became a free agent upon the expiry of his contract on February 12, 2025.

=== Toronto Argonauts ===
On February 12, 2025, it was announced that Christmas had signed with the Toronto Argonauts. He retired on May 8, 2026.
