= Nyqwan Murray =

American gridiron football player (born 1997)

No. 8 – Orlando Pirates
- Position: Wide receiver
- Roster status: Active

Personal information
- Born: July 28, 1997 (age 29); Orlando, Florida, U.S.
- Listed height: 6 ft 0 in (1.83 m)
- Listed weight: 192 lb (87 kg)

Career information
- High school: Oak Ridge (Orlando, FL)
- College: Florida State
- NFL draft: 2019: undrafted

Career history
- Seattle Seahawks (2019)*; Toronto Argonauts (2020)*; Jacksonville Sharks (2022); St. Louis BattleHawks (2023)*; San Antonio Gunslingers (2024–2025); Orlando Pirates (2026–present)
- * Offseason or practice squad member only

Awards and highlights
- First-team All-IFL (2025); First-team All-NAL (2022); Second-team All-IFL (2026)
- Stats at Pro Football Reference

Nyqwan Murray (born July 28, 1997) is an American football wide receiver for the Orlando Pirates of the Indoor Football League (IFL).

== Early life ==
Murray played high school football at Oak Ridge High School in Orlando, Florida.

== College career ==
Murray played college football at Florida State. During the 2016 Orange Bowl against Michigan, Murray caught a 92-yard touchdown pass from Deondre Francois, an Orange Bowl record for the longest touchdown reception.

== Professional career ==
Pre-draft measurables
Height	Weight	Arm length	Hand span	40-yard dash	20-yard shuttle	Three-cone drill	Vertical jump	Broad jump	Bench press
5 ft 10 1/4 in (1.78 m)	191 lb (87 kg)	31 1/8 in (0.79 m)	9 3/8 in (0.24 m)	4.63 s	4.40 s	7.20 s	34.0 in (0.86 m)	9 ft 5 in (2.87 m)	8 reps
All values from NFL Combine

=== Seattle Seahawks ===
After going undrafted in the 2019 NFL draft, Murray participated in the Seattle Seahawks rookie minicamp, and later signed with the team on August 1, 2019, but was waived five days later. He was re-signed on August 27, 2019. He was waived a second time on September 1, 2019.

=== Toronto Argonauts ===
Murray was signed by the Toronto Argonauts of the Canadian Football League (CFL) on December 4, 2019. He signed a contract extension with the team on December 29, 2020. On July 27, 2021, Murray was released by the Argonauts.

=== Jacksonville Sharks ===
Murray was signed to the Jacksonville Sharks of the National Arena League on December 10, 2021. He was named 2022 All-NAL First-team Offense.

=== St Louis BattleHawks ===
On January 1, 2023, Murray was selected by the St. Louis BattleHawks in the 13th round of the 2023 XFL Supplemental Draft.

=== San Antonio Gunslingers ===
On November 29, 2023, Murray signed with the San Antonio Gunslingers.

He re-signed with the team on February 10, 2025.

=== Orlando Pirates ===
On November 21, 2025, Murray signed with the Orlando Pirates.
