= Marvin Wilson (American football) =

American football player (born 1998)

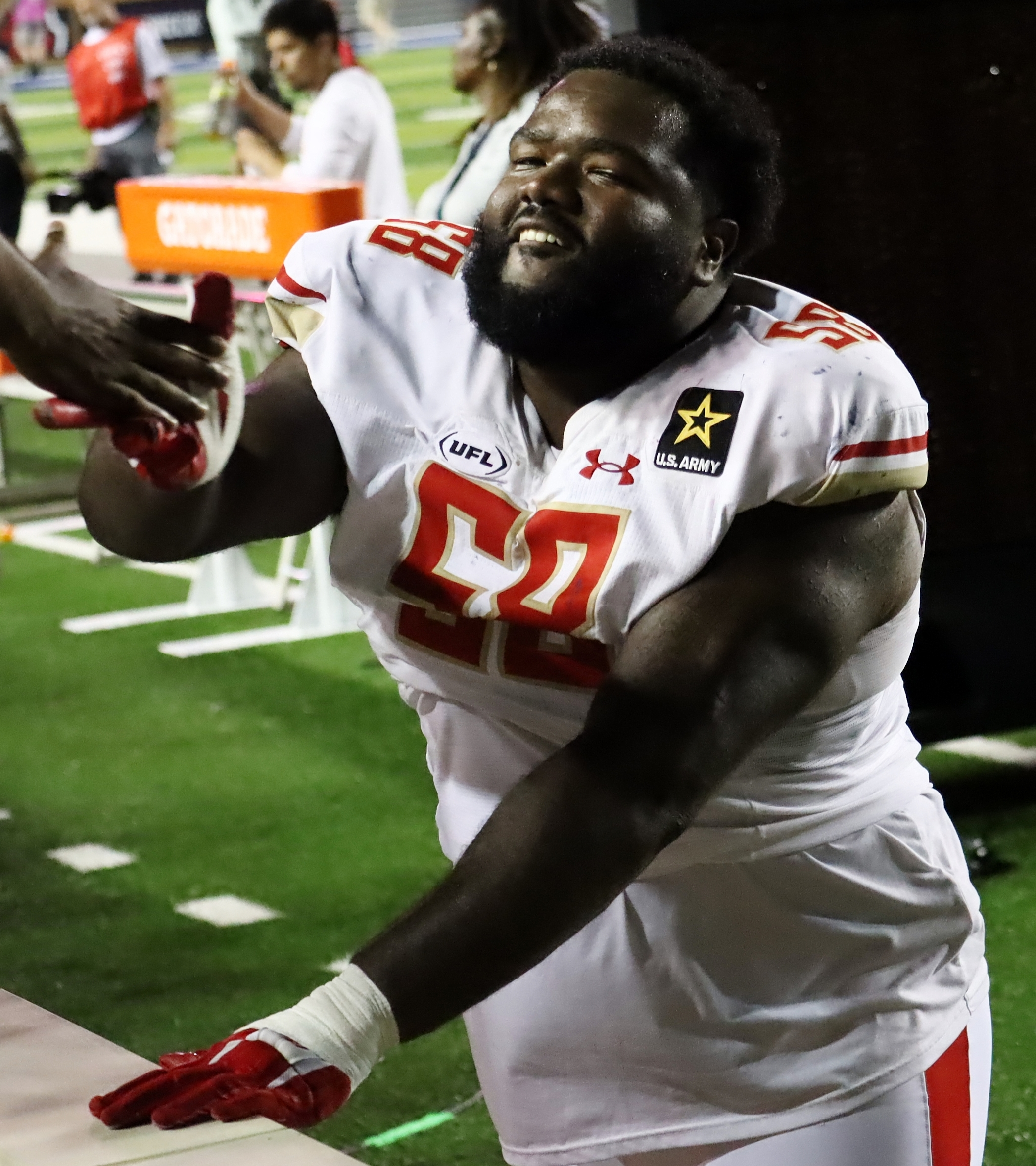
- Wilson with the Birmingham Stallions in 2024

No. 73, 58
- Position: Defensive tackle

Personal information
- Born: September 5, 1998 (age 28); Houston, Texas, U.S.
- Listed height: 6 ft 4 in (1.93 m)
- Listed weight: 303 lb (137 kg)

Career information
- High school: Episcopal (Bellaire, Texas)
- College: Florida State (2017–2020)
- NFL draft: 2021: undrafted

Career history
- Cleveland Browns (2021)*; Philadelphia Eagles (2021–2022); Philadelphia Stars (2024)*; Birmingham Stallions (2024–2025)
- * Offseason or practice squad member only

Awards and highlights
- USA Today All-American (2016); First-team All-ACC (2019); Second-team All-ACC (2020); UFL champion (2024)

Career NFL statistics
- Total tackles: 7
- Stats at Pro Football Reference

Marvin Wilson (born September 5, 1998) is an American former professional football player who was a defensive tackle in the National Football League (NFL). He played college football for the Florida State Seminoles and signed with the Cleveland Browns as an undrafted free agent in 2021.

== Professional career ==
Pre-draft measurables
Height	Weight	Arm length	Hand span	40-yard dash	10-yard split	20-yard split	20-yard shuttle	Three-cone drill	Vertical jump	Broad jump	Bench press
6 ft 3 7/8 in (1.93 m)	303 lb (137 kg)	33 3/8 in (0.85 m)	9 3/4 in (0.25 m)	5.08 s	1.78 s	2.91 s	4.83 s	7.71 s	25.5 in (0.65 m)	8 ft 11 in (2.72 m)	23 reps
All values from Pro Day

=== Cleveland Browns ===
Wilson signed with the Cleveland Browns following the 2021 NFL draft on May 3, 2021. Wilson was waived by the Browns on August 31, 2021.

=== Philadelphia Eagles ===
On September 2, 2021, Wilson was signed to the Philadelphia Eagles practice squad. Wilson made his NFL debut on January 8, 2022, in the Eagles' week 18 game against the Dallas Cowboys, collecting 3 combined tackles in the 51-26 loss. He signed a reserve/future contract with the Eagles on January 18, 2022.

On August 30, 2022, Wilson was waived by the Eagles and signed to the practice squad the next day. He was released on April 30, 2023. Wilson was re-signed by the Eagles on August 19, 2023. He was released on August 29, 2023.

On October 10, 2023, the Minnesota Vikings hosted Wilson for a workout, but no deal was reached.

=== Birmingham Stallions ===
On November 9, 2023, Wilson was signed by the Philadelphia Stars of the United States Football League (USFL), but was immediately traded to the Birmingham Stallions with safety Cody Brown in exchange for guard Gray Davis and offensive tackle Ryan Pope. Wilson re-signed with the Stallions on August 14, 2024. He was released on March 19, 2026.

Austin announced his retirement from football August 31st, 2026.
