= 2013 Atlantic Coast Conference football season =

2013 ACC football season
- League: NCAA Division I FBS (Football Bowl Subdivision)
- Sport: Football
- Duration: August 29, 2013 to January 2014
- Teams: 14

Regular season
- Atlantic champions: Florida State
- Coastal champions: Duke

ACC Championship Game
- Champions: Florida State
- Runners-up: Duke

ACC seasons
- ← 2012 2014 →

2013 Atlantic Coast Conference football standings
	Conf.			Overall
Team	W		L	W		L
Atlantic Division
No. 1 Florida State x$#	8	–	0	14	–	0
No. 8 Clemson %	7	–	1	11	–	2
Boston College	4	–	4	7	–	6
Syracuse	4	–	4	7	–	6
Maryland	3	–	5	7	–	6
Wake Forest	2	–	6	4	–	8
NC State	0	–	8	3	–	9
Coastal Division
No. 23 Duke x	6	–	2	10	–	4
Miami (FL)	5	–	3	9	–	4
Virginia Tech	5	–	3	8	–	5
Georgia Tech	5	–	3	7	–	6
North Carolina	4	–	4	7	–	6
Pittsburgh	3	–	5	7	–	6
Virginia	0	–	8	2	–	10
Championship: Florida State 45, Duke 7
# – BCS National Champion; $ – BCS representative as conference champion; % – BCS at-large representative; x – Division champion/co-champions; Rankings from AP Poll

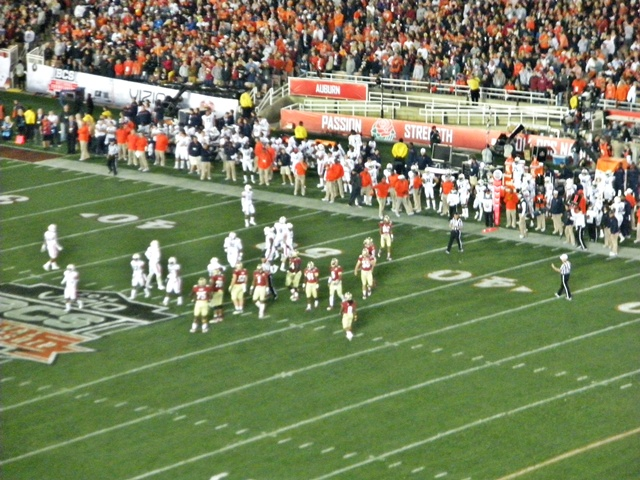
The Florida State Seminoles defeated the Auburn Tigers at the Rose Bowl, Pasadena, California

The 2013 Atlantic Coast Conference (ACC) football season was an NCAA football season that was played from August 29, 2013, to January 7, 2014. It was the first season of play for former Big East Conference members Pittsburgh and Syracuse. Syracuse played in the Atlantic Division, while Pittsburgh played in the Coastal Division. It was also the last season for Maryland in the ACC as they moved to the Big Ten Conference in 2014.

The Atlantic Coast Conference consisted of 14 members in two divisions. The Atlantic division consisted of Boston College, Clemson, Florida State, Maryland, North Carolina State, Syracuse, and Wake Forest. The Coastal division consisted of Duke, Georgia Tech, Miami, North Carolina, Pittsburgh, Virginia, and Virginia Tech. The division champions, Duke and Florida State, met in December in the 2013 ACC Championship Game, located in Charlotte, North Carolina at Bank of America Stadium.

== Preseason ==
=== Preseason Poll ===
The 2013 ACC Preseason Poll was announced at the ACC Football Kickoff meetings in Greensboro, NC on July 22. Miami was voted to win Coastal division while Clemson was voted to win the Atlantic division and the conference. Tajh Boyd of Clemson was voted the Preseason ACC Player of the Year.

==== Atlantic Division poll ====
1. Clemson – 815 (102 first place votes)
2. Florida State – 731 (18)
3. North Carolina State – 490
4. Wake Forest – 392
5. Maryland – 373
6. Syracuse - 320
7. Boston College – 211

==== Coastal Division poll ====
1. Miami – 736 (65)
2. Virginia Tech – 654 (27)
3. North Carolina – 649 (22)
4. Georgia Tech – 522 (6)
5. Pittsburgh - 313
6. Virginia – 230
7. Duke – 228

==== Predicted ACC Championship Game Winner ====
1. Clemson – 95
2. Florida State – 15
3. Georgia Tech – 3
4. Miami – 3
5. North Carolina - 3
6. Virginia Tech - 1

==== Preseason ACC Player of the Year ====
1. Tajh Boyd, CLEM - 105
2. Duke Johnson, MIA - 4
3. Logan Thomas, VT - 3
4. Sammy Watkins, CLEM - 3
5. Bryn Renner, UNC - 2
6. Jeremiah Attaochu, GT - 1
7. Lamarcus Joyner, FSU - 1
8. Stephen Morris, MIA - 1

=== Preseason All Conference Teams ===
==== Offense ====
Position	Player	School
Wide receiver	Sammy Watkins	Clemson
Wide receiver	Michael Campanaro	Wake Forest
Tight end	Eric Ebron	North Carolina
Tackle	James Hurst	North Carolina
Tackle	Morgan Moses	Virginia
Guard	Tre' Jackson	Florida State
Guard	Brandon Linder	Miami
Center	Bryan Stork	Florida State
Quarterback	Tajh Boyd	Clemson
Running back	Duke Johnson	Miami
Running back	James Wilder, Jr.	Florida State

==== Defense ====
Position	Player	School
Defensive end	Jeremiah Attaochu	Georgia Tech
Defensive end	Kareem Martin	North Carolina
Defensive tackle	Nikita Whitlock	Wake Forest
Defensive tackle	Timmy Jernigan	Florida State
Linebacker	Jack Tyler	Virginia Tech
Linebacker	Christian Jones	Florida State
Linebacker	Kevin Pierre-Louis	Boston College
Cornerback	Ross Cockrell	Duke
Cornerback	Lamarcus Joyner	Florida State
Safety	Tre Boston	North Carolina
Safety	Jason Hendricks	Pittsburgh

==== Specialist ====
Position	Player	School
Placekicker	Chandler Catanzaro	Clemson
Punter	Will Monday	Duke
Specialist	Stefon Diggs	Maryland

== Coaches ==
Three universities hired new coaches for the 2013 football season. NC State hired Dave Doeren from Northern Illinois after he led the Huskies to back-to-back MAC championships. With this hire, Doeren was made the second highest paid coach in the ACC (behind Florida State's Jimbo Fisher) and the 27th highest paid coach in the country. Boston College also changed coaches, hiring Steve Addazio from Temple. Addazio had only been a head coach for 2 years, however, Boston College athletic director Brad Bates stated that he has had Addazio on his short list of coaches for years. Syracuse promoted their defensive coordinator, Scott Shafer, of the previous 4 years to head coach after their previous head coach, Doug Marrone, left for a job coaching the Buffalo Bills of the NFL. They will join Paul Chryst of Pittsburgh (due to conference realignment) as new coaches in the ACC.

NOTE: Stats shown are before the beginning of the season

Team	Head coach	Years at school	Overall record	Record at school	ACC record
Boston College	Steve Addazio	1	13–11	0–0	0–0
Clemson	Dabo Swinney	6	40–21	40–21	26–11
Duke	David Cutcliffe	6	65–69	21–40	9–31
Florida State	Jimbo Fisher	3	31–10	31–10	18–6
Georgia Tech	Paul Johnson	6	148–65	41–26	26–14
Maryland	Randy Edsall	3	80–87	6–18	3–13
Miami	Al Golden	3	40–45	13–11	8–8
North Carolina	Larry Fedora	2	42-23	8-4	5-3
NC State	Dave Doeren	1	23–4	0–0	0-0
Pittsburgh	Paul Chryst	2	6–7	6–7	0–0
Syracuse	Scott Shafer	1	0–0	0–0	0–0
Virginia	Mike London	4	40–26	16–21	8–16
Virginia Tech	Frank Beamer	26	256-127–4	216–104–2	57–15
Wake Forest	Jim Grobe	13	106–107–1	73–74	40–56

== Rankings ==
Legend
	Improvement in ranking
	Drop in ranking
	Not ranked previous week
RV	Received votes but were not ranked in Top 25 of poll

		Pre	Wk 1	Wk 2	Wk 3	Wk 4	Wk 5	Wk 6	Wk 7	Wk 8	Wk 9	Wk 10	Wk 11	Wk 12	Wk 13	Wk 14	Wk 15	Final
Boston College	AP																	
Boston College	C			RV														
Boston College	BCS	Not released																
Clemson	AP	8	4	3	3	3	3	3	3	9	9	8	8	7	6	13	12	8
Clemson	C	8	5	5	4	4	4	4	4	10	8	7	6	6	4	11	11	7
Clemson	BCS	Not released								9	8	7	8	7	6	13	12	
Duke	AP										RV	RV	RV	25	24	20	22	23
Duke	C										RV	RV	RV	24	24	20	21	22
Duke	BCS	Not released													24	20	24	
Florida State	AP	11	10	10	8	8	8	6	5	3	3	3	2	2	2	1	1	1
Florida State	C	12	10	9	8	8	6	6	5	3	3	3	2	2	2	1	1	1
Florida State	BCS	Not released								2	3	2	2	2	2	1	1	
Georgia Tech	AP	RV	RV	RV	RV	RV												
Georgia Tech	C		RV	RV	RV	RV												
Georgia Tech	BCS	Not released																
Maryland	AP					RV	25											
Maryland	C					RV												
Maryland	BCS	Not released																
Miami	AP	RV	RV	15	16	15	14	13	10	7	7	14	24			RV	RV	
Miami	C	RV	24	18	17	15	14	14	11	6	6	14	23	RV	RV	RV	25	RV
Miami	BCS	Not released								7	7	11	23					
North Carolina	AP	RV																
North Carolina	C	RV	RV															
North Carolina	BCS	Not released																
NC State	AP																	
NC State	C																	
NC State	BCS	Not released																
Pittsburgh	AP																	
Pittsburgh	C																	
Pittsburgh	BCS	Not released																
Syracuse	AP																	
Syracuse	C																	
Syracuse	BCS	Not released																
Virginia	AP		RV															
Virginia	C																	
Virginia	BCS	Not released																
Virginia Tech	AP	RV	RV	RV	RV	RV	RV	24	19	16	RV		RV					
Virginia Tech	C	RV	RV	RV	RV	RV	25	25	20	19	RV		RV			RV	RV	
Virginia Tech	BCS	Not released								14								
Wake Forest	AP																	
Wake Forest	C																	
Wake Forest	BCS	Not released																

== Bowl Games ==
Bowl Game	Date	Stadium	City	Television	Matchup/Result	Attendance	Payout (US$) per team
BCS
BCS National Championship Game	January 6, 2014	Rose Bowl Stadium	Pasadena, CA	ESPN	Florida State 34, Auburn 31	94,208	
Discover Orange Bowl	January 3, 2014	Sun Life Stadium	Miami Gardens, FL	ESPN	Clemson 40, Ohio State 35	72,080	
Non-BCS
Little Caesars Pizza Bowl	December 26, 2013	Ford Field	Detroit, MI	ESPN	Pittsburgh 30, Bowling Green 27	26,259	
Military Bowl	December 27, 2013	Navy–Marine Corps Memorial Stadium	Annapolis, MD	ESPN	Marshall 31, Maryland 20	30,163	
Texas Bowl	December 27, 2013	Reliant Stadium	Houston, TX	ESPN	Syracuse 21, Minnesota 17	32,327	
Belk Bowl	December 28, 2013	Bank of America Stadium	Charlotte, NC	ESPN	North Carolina 39, Cincinnati 17	45,211	
Russell Athletic Bowl	December 28, 2013	Florida Citrus Bowl Stadium	Orlando, FL	ESPN	Louisville 36, Miami 9	51,098	
Franklin American Mortgage Music City Bowl	December 30, 2013	LP Field	Nashville, TN	ESPN	Ole Miss 25, Georgia Tech 17	52,125	
Advocare V100 Bowl	December 31, 2013	Independence Stadium	Shreveport, LA	ESPN	Arizona 42, Boston College 19	36,917	
Hyundai Sun Bowl	December 31, 2013	Sun Bowl Stadium	El Paso, TX	CBS	UCLA 42, Virginia Tech 12	47,912	
Chick-fil-A Bowl	December 31, 2013	Georgia Dome	Atlanta, GA	ESPN	Texas A&M 52, Duke 48	67,946	

== Postseason ==
=== All-conference teams ===
==== First Team ====
Offense

Position	Player	School
Quarterback	Jameis Winston	Florida State
Running back	Andre Williams	Boston College
Running back	Devonta Freeman	Florida State
Wide receiver	Sammy Watkins	Clemson
Wide receiver	Jamison Crowder	Duke
Wide receiver	Rashad Greene	Florida State
Tight end	Eric Ebron	North Carolina
Tackle	Cameron Erving	Florida State
Tackle	James Hurst	North Carolina
Guard	Tre' Jackson	Florida State
Guard	Shaq Mason	Georgia Tech
Center	Bryan Stork	Florida State
Placekicker	Nate Freese	Boston College
Specialist	Ryan Switzer	North Carolina

Defense

Position	Player	School
Defensive end	Vic Beasley	Clemson
Defensive end	Kareem Martin	North Carolina
Defensive tackle	Aaron Donald	Pittsburgh
Defensive tackle	Nikita Whitlock	Wake Forest
Linebacker	Kelby Brown	Duke
Linebacker	Denzel Perryman	Miami
Linebacker	Kevin Pierre-Louis	Boston College
Cornerback	Lamarcus Joyner	Florida State
Cornerback	Ross Cockrell	Duke
Safety	Anthony Harris	Virginia
Safety	Jeremy Cash	Duke
Punter	Pat O'Donnell	Miami

==== Second Team ====
Offense

Position	Player	School
Quarterback	Tajh Boyd	Clemson
Running back	Kevin Parks	Virginia
Running back	Duke Johnson	Miami
Wide receiver	Michael Campanaro	Wake Forest
Wide receiver	Allen Hurns	Miami
Wide receiver	Tyler Boyd	Pittsburgh
Tight end	Nick O'Leary	Florida State
Tackle	Brandon Thomas	Clemson
Tackle	Matt Patchan	Boston College
Guard	Laken Tomlinson	Duke
Guard	Brandon Linder	Miami
Center	Macky MacPherson	Syracuse
Placekicker	Roberto Aguayo	Florida State
Specialist	Jamison Crowder	Duke

Defense

Position	Player	School
Defensive end	Jeremiah Attaochu	Georgia Tech
Defensive end	Kenny Anunike	Duke
Defensive tackle	Timmy Jernigan	Florida State
Defensive tackle	Derrick Hopkins	Virginia Tech
Linebacker	Telvin Smith	Florida State
Linebacker	Jack Tyler	Virginia Tech
Linebacker	Christian Jones	Florida State
Cornerback	Kendall Fuller	Virginia Tech
Cornerback	Bashaud Breeland	Clemson
Safety	Terrence Brooks	Florida State
Safety	Tre Boston	North Carolina
Punter	A.J. Hughes	Virginia Tech

==== Third Team ====
Offense

Position	Player	School
Quarterback	Stephen Morris	Miami
Running back	Roderick McDowell	Clemson
Running back	Jerome Smith	Syracuse
Wide receiver	Devin Street	Pittsburgh
Wide receiver	Alex Amidon	Boston College
Wide receiver	Kelvin Benjamin	Florida State
Tight end	Braxton Deaver	Duke
Tackle	Perry Simmons	Duke
Tackle	Morgan Moses	Virginia
Guard	Tyler Shatley	Clemson
Guard	Josue Matías	Florida State
Center	Andy Gallik	Boston College
Placekicker	Chandler Catanzaro	Clemson
Specialist	DeVon Edwards	Duke

Defense

Position	Player	School
Defensive end	Kasim Edebali	Boston College
Defensive end	Mario Edwards Jr.	Florida State
Defensive tackle	Jay Bromley	Syracuse
Defensive tackle	Luther Maddy	Virginia Tech
Linebacker	Steele Divitto	Boston College
Linebacker	Stephone Anthony	Clemson
Linebacker	Spencer Shuey	Clemson
Cornerback	Kyle Fuller	Virginia Tech
Cornerback	Brandon Facyson	Virginia Tech
Safety	Durell Eskridge	Syracuse
Safety	Nate Andrews	Florida State
Punter	Will Monday	Duke

=== ACC Individual Awards ===
ACC Player of the Year

QB Jameis Winston - Florida State

Rookie of the Year

QB Jameis Winston - Florida State

Coach of the Year

David Cutcliffe - Duke

Offensive Player of the Year

QB Jameis Winston - Florida State

Offensive Rookie of the Year

QB Jameis Winston - Florida State

Brian Piccolo Award

RB Robert Godhigh - Georgia Tech

Jacobs Blocking Trophy

T Cameron Erving - Florida State

Defensive Player of the Year

DT Aaron Donald - Pittsburgh

Defensive Rookie of the Year

CB Kendall Fuller - Virginia Tech

Jim Tatum Award

T Perry Simmons - Duke

=== National Awards ===
Outland Trophy

DT Aaron Donald- Pittsburgh

Lombardi Award

DT Aaron Donald - Pittsburgh

Nagurski Trophy

DT Aaron Donald - Pittsburgh

Bednarik Award

DT Aaron Donald - Pittsburgh

Doak Walker Award

RB Andre Williams- Boston College

Lou Groza Award

PK Roberto Aguayo - Florida State

Rimington Trophy

C Bryan Stork - Florida State

Walter Camp Coach of the Year Award

David Cutcliffe - Duke

Heisman Trophy

QB Jameis Winston- Florida State

Walter Camp Award

QB Jameis Winston - Florida State

Davey O'Brien Award

QB Jameis Winston - Florida State

== 2014 NFL draft ==
Team	Round 1	Round 2	Round 3	Round 4	Round 5	Round 6	Round 7	Total
Boston College				2			2	4
Clemson	1		1	2		1		5
Duke				1				1
Florida State	1	2	1	2	1			7
Georgia Tech		1				1	1	3
Maryland			1					1
Miami			1			1	1	3
North Carolina	1		1	2			1	6
NC State				1				1
Pittsburgh	1			1	1			3
Syracuse			1		1			2
Virginia			1	1		1		3
Virginia Tech	1			1		1		3
Wake Forest							1	1

*	= compensatory selection

Rnd.	Pick	Team	Player	Pos.	College	Notes
1	4	Buffalo Bills	Sammy Watkins	WR	Clemson	from Cleveland (Note: No. 4: Cleveland → Buffalo (D). Cleveland traded this selection to Buffalo in exchange for Buffalo's 2014 first-round selection (No. 9 overall), 2015 first-round selection, and 2015 fourth-round selection.)
1	10	Detroit Lions	Eric Ebron	TE	North Carolina	
1	13	St. Louis Rams	Aaron Donald	DT	Pittsburgh	
1	14	Chicago Bears	Kyle Fuller	CB	Virginia Tech	
1	28	Carolina Panthers	Kelvin Benjamin	WR	Florida State	
2	41	St. Louis Rams	Lamarcus Joyner	S	Florida State	from Buffalo (Note: No. 41: Buffalo → St. Louis (D). Buffalo traded this selection to St. Louis in exchange for St. Louis' second and fifth round selections (44th & 153rd).)
2	48	Baltimore Ravens	Timmy Jernigan	DT	Florida State	
2	50	San Diego Chargers	Jeremiah Attaochu	LB	Georgia Tech	from Miami (Note: No. 50: Miami → San Diego (D). Miami traded this selection to San Diego in exchange for San Diego's second and fourth round selections (57th & 125th).)
3	66	Washington Redskins	Morgan Moses	T	Virginia	
3	74	New York Giants	Jay Bromley	DT	Syracuse	
3	79	Baltimore Ravens	Terrence Brooks	S	Florida State	
3	80	New York Jets	Dexter McDougle	CB	Maryland	
3	84	Arizona Cardinals	Kareem Martin	DE	North Carolina	
3	93	Jacksonville Jaguars	Brandon Linder	G	Miami (FL)	from New England (Note: No. 93: New England → Jacksonville (D). New England traded this selection to Jacksonville in exchange for one of Jacksonville's selections in each of the fourth and sixth rounds (105th & 179th).)
3*	100	San Francisco 49ers	Brandon Thomas	G	Clemson	
4	102	Washington Redskins	Bashaud Breeland	CB	Clemson	
4	103	Atlanta Falcons	Devonta Freeman	RB	Florida State	
4	105	New England Patriots	Bryan Stork	C	Florida State	from Jacksonville (Note: No. 105: Jacksonville → New England (D). see No. 93: New England → Jacksonville.)
4	109	Buffalo Bills	Ross Cockrell	CB	Duke	
4	111	Cincinnati Bengals	Russell Bodine	C	North Carolina	from Detroit via Seattle (Note: No. 111: multiple trades: No. 111: Detroit → Seattle (D). see No. 40: Seattle → Detroit. No. 111: Seattle → Cincinnati (D). Seattle traded this selection to Cincinnati in exchange for Cincinnati's fourth and sixth round selections(123rd & 199th).)
4	113	New York Giants	Andre Williams	RB	Boston College	
4	118	Pittsburgh Steelers	Martavis Bryant	WR	Clemson	
4	120	Arizona Cardinals	Logan Thomas	QB	Virginia Tech	
4	128	Carolina Panthers	Tre Boston	S	North Carolina	
4	129	San Francisco 49ers	Dontae Johnson	CB	NC State	
4	132	Seattle Seahawks	Kevin Pierre-Louis	LB	Boston College	
4*	134	Baltimore Ravens	Brent Urban	DT	Virginia	
4*	135	Houston Texans	Tom Savage	QB	Pittsburgh	
5	144	Jacksonville Jaguars	Telvin Smith	LB	Florida State	
5	146	Dallas Cowboys	Devin Street	WR	Pittsburgh	from Oakland via Seattle and Detroit (Note: No. 146: multiple trades: No. 146: Oakland → Seattle (PD). Oakland traded this selection to Seattle in exchange for quarterback Matt Flynn. The trade also conditionally included the Raiders' 2015 fifth round selection, however, that condition was voided when the Raiders waived Flynn in October 2013. No. 146: Seattle → Detroit (D). see No. 40: Seattle → Detroit. No. 146: Detroit → Dallas (D). Detroit traded this selection to Dallas in exchange for Dallas' fifth and seventh round selections (158th & 229th).)
5	168	Atlanta Falcons	Marquis Spruill	LB	Syracuse	from Carolina via Minnesota (Note: No. 168: multiple trades: No. 168: Carolina → Minnesota (D). see No. 148: Minnesota → Carolina. No. 168: Minnesota → Atlanta (D). Minnesota traded this selection to Atlanta in exchange for Atlanta's sixth and seventh round selections (182nd & 220th).)
6	182	Minnesota Vikings	Antone Exum	CB	Virginia Tech	from Atlanta (Note: No. 182: Atlanta → Minnesota (D). see No. 168: Minnesota → Atlanta.)
6	191	Chicago Bears	Pat O'Donnell	P	Miami (FL)	
6	205	Jacksonville Jaguars	Luke Bowanko	C	Virginia	from San Francisco (Note: No. 205: San Francisco → Jacksonville (PD). San Francisco traded this selection to Jacksonville in exchange for quarterback Blaine Gabbert.)
6	206	New England Patriots	Jemea Thomas	S	Georgia Tech	
6*	213	New York Jets	Tajh Boyd	QB	Clemson	
7	218	Baltimore Ravens	Michael Campanaro	WR	Wake Forest	from Cleveland (Note: No. 218: Cleveland → Baltimore (D). Cleveland traded this selection to Baltimore in exchange for Baltimore's sixth round selection in 2015 (201st).)
7	223	Minnesota Vikings	Brandon Watts	LB	Georgia Tech	
7	225	Minnesota Vikings	Jabari Price	CB	North Carolina	from New York Giants via Carolina (Note: No. 225: multiple trades: No. 225: New York Giants → Carolina (PD). The New York Giants traded this selection to Carolina in exchange for linebacker Jon Beason. No. 168: Carolina → Minnesota (D). see No. 148: Minnesota → Carolina.)
7	229	Detroit Lions	Nate Freese	K	Boston College	from Chicago via Dallas (Note: No. 229: multiple trades: No. 229: Chicago → Dallas (PD). Chicago traded this selection to Dallas in exchange for tight end Dante Rosario. No. 229: Dallas → Detroit (D). see No. 146: Detroit → Dallas.)
7	237	Buffalo Bills	Seantrel Henderson	T	Miami (FL)	from Philadelphia (Note: No. 237: Philadelphia → Buffalo (D). see No. 224: Buffalo → Philadelphia. (Note: Wilson, Brad (May 10, 2014). "Philadelphia Eagles trade Bryce Brown to Buffalo in complicated deal". lehighvalleylive.com. The Express-Times.))
7	243	San Francisco 49ers	Kaleb Ramsey	DT	Boston College	from Carolina (Note: No. 243: Carolina → San Francisco (PD). Carolina traded this selection to San Francisco in exchange for Colin Jones shortly before the beginning of the 2012 season.)

N.B: In the explanations below, (D) denotes trades that took place during the 2014 Draft, while (PD) indicates trades completed pre-draft.
