= 2014 All-America college football team =

Official list of the best college football players of 2014

The 2014 All-America college football team includes those players of American college football who have been honored by various selector organizations as the best players at their respective positions. The selector organizations award the "All-America" honor annually following the conclusion of the fall college football season. The original All-America team was the 1889 All-America college football team selected by Caspar Whitney. In 1950, the National Collegiate Athletic Bureau, which is the National Collegiate Athletic Association's (NCAA) service bureau, compiled the first list of All-Americans including first-team selections on teams created for a national audience that received national circulation with the intent of recognizing selections made from viewpoints that were nationwide. Since 1957, College Sports Information Directors of America (CoSIDA) has bestowed Academic All-American recognition on male and female athletes in Divisions I, II, and III of the NCAA as well as National Association of Intercollegiate Athletics athletes, covering all NCAA championship sports.

The 2014 College Football All-America Team is composed of the following All-America first teams chosen by the following selector organizations: Associated Press (AP), Football Writers Association of America (FWAA), American Football Coaches Association (AFCA), Walter Camp Foundation (WCFF), The Sporting News (TSN), Sports Illustrated (SI), USA Today (USAT) ESPN, CBS Sports (CBS), College Football News (CFN), Scout.com, and Yahoo! Sports (Yahoo!).

Currently, the NCAA compiles consensus all-America teams in the sports of Division I-FBS football and Division I men's basketball using a point system computed from All-America teams named by coaches associations or media sources. The system consists of three points for a first-team honor, two points for second-team honor, and one point for third-team honor. Honorable mention and fourth team or lower recognitions are not accorded any points. Football consensus teams are compiled by position and the player accumulating the most points at each position is named first team consensus all-American. Currently, the NCAA recognizes All-Americans selected by the AP, AFCA, FWAA, TSN, and the WCFF to determine Consensus and Unanimous All-Americans.

In 2014, there were 12 unanimous All-Americans.

Name	Position	Year	University
Joey Bosa	Defensive Line	Sophomore	Ohio St.
Tevin Coleman	Running Back	Junior	Indiana
Landon Collins	Defensive Back	Junior	Alabama
Amari Cooper	Wide Receiver	Junior	Alabama
Senquez Golson	Defensive Back	Senior	Ole Miss
Melvin Gordon	Running Back	Junior	Wisconsin
Gerod Holliman	Defensive Back	Sophomore	Louisville
Tre' Jackson	Offensive Line	Senior	Florida St.
Hau'oli Kikaha	Linebacker	Senior	Washington
Marcus Mariota	Quarterback	Junior	Oregon
Brandon Scherff	Offensive Line	Senior	Iowa
Scooby Wright III	Linebacker	Sophomore	Arizona

== Offense ==
=== Quarterback ===
- Marcus Mariota, Oregon -- UNANIMOUS -- (AP, WCFF, TSN, AFCA, FWAA, USAT, CBS, ESPN, Scout, SI, FOX)

=== Running back ===
- Tevin Coleman, Indiana -- UNANIMOUS -- (AP, WCFF, TSN, AFCA, FWAA, USAT, CBS, ESPN, Scout, SI, FOX)
- James Conner, Pittsburgh (AFCA)
- Melvin Gordon, Wisconsin -- UNANIMOUS -- (AP, WCFF, TSN, AFCA, FWAA, USAT, CBS, ESPN, Scout, SI, FOX)

=== Wide receiver ===
- Amari Cooper, Alabama -- UNANIMOUS -- (AP, WCFF, TSN, AFCA, FWAA, USAT, CBS, ESPN, Scout, SI, FOX)
- Rashard Higgins, Colorado State -- CONSENSUS -- (AP, WCFF, FWAA, USAT, ESPN, SI, FOX)
- Jaelen Strong, Arizona State (ESPN)
- Kevin White, West Virginia (TSN, AFCA, CBS, Scout)

=== Tight end ===
- Nick O'Leary, Florida State -- CONSENSUS -- (AP, WCFF, AFCA, USAT, CBS, Scout, SI)
- Clive Walford, Miami (FOX)
- Maxx Williams, Minnesota (TSN, FWAA)

=== Offensive line ===
- Jack Allen, Michigan State (USAT)
- A. J. Cann, South Carolina (TSN, CBS, ESPN, FOX)
- Kyle Costigan, Wisconsin (ESPN)
- Reese Dismukes, Auburn -- CONSENSUS -- (AP, WCFF, AFCA, FWAA, CBS, ESPN, Scout)
- Spencer Drango, Baylor -- CONSENSUS -- (AP, FWAA, USAT, ESPN, Scout, FOX)
- Cameron Erving, Florida State (CBS)
- Jake Fisher, Oregon (FWAA)
- Hroniss Grasu, Oregon (TSN, SI)
- Rob Havenstein, Wisconsin (AFCA)
- Tre' Jackson, Florida State -- UNANIMOUS -- (AP, WCFF, TSN, AFCA, FWAA, CBS, Scout, SI)
- Arie Kouandjio, Alabama (AFCA, USAT, SI)
- Shaquille Mason, Georgia Tech (USAT)
- Cedric Ogbuehi, Texas A&M (WCFF, Scout)
- Andrus Peat, Stanford (TSN, ESPN, SI)
- Brandon Scherff, Iowa -- UNANIMOUS -- (AP, WCFF, TSN, AFCA, FWAA, USAT, CBS, Scout, SI, FOX)
- Laken Tomlinson, Duke -- CONSENSUS -- (AP, WCFF)

== Defense ==
=== Defensive line ===
- Vic Beasley, Clemson -- CONSENSUS -- (AP, WCFF, AFCA, FOX)
- Michael Bennett, Ohio State (CBS)
- Joey Bosa, Ohio State -- UNANIMOUS -- (AP, WCFF, TSN, AFCA, FWAA, USAT, CBS, Scout, FOX)
- Malcom Brown, Texas -- CONSENSUS -- (AP, TSN, FWAA, USAT, CBS, ESPN, FOX)
- Eddie Goldman, Florida State (SI)
- Nate Orchard, Utah (WCFF, FWAA, ESPN, Scout, SI)
- Shane Ray, Missouri -- CONSENSUS -- (WCFF, TSN, AFCA, FWAA, USAT, CBS, Scout, SI)
- Danny Shelton, Washington (AP, TSN, USAT)
- Leonard Williams, Southern California (AFCA, ESPN, FOX)

=== Linebacker ===
- Paul Dawson, TCU -- CONSENSUS -- (AP, WCFF, USAT, Scout, FOX)
- Trey DePriest, Alabama (AFCA)
- Eric Kendricks, UCLA (TSN, USAT, Scout, SI)
- Hau'oli Kikaha, Washington -- UNANIMOUS -- (AP, WCFF, TSN, AFCA, FWAA, CBS, ESPN, Scout, FOX)
- Benardrick McKinney, Mississippi State (FWAA, ESPN, SI)
- Shaq Thompson, Washington (CBS, ESPN, SI)
- Scooby Wright III, Arizona -- UNANIMOUS -- (AP, WCFF, TSN, AFCA, FWAA, USAT, CBS, ESPN, Scout, SI, FOX)

=== Defensive back ===
- Landon Collins, Alabama -- UNANIMOUS -- (AP, WCFF, TSN, AFCA, FWAA, CBS, ESPN, Scout, SI, FOX)
- Kurtis Drummond, Michigan State (FWAA)
- Ifo Ekpre-Olomu, Oregon -- CONSENSUS -- (AP, WCFF, AFCA, USAT, SI, FOX)
- Senquez Golson, Ole Miss -- UNANIMOUS -- (AP, WCFF, TSN, AFCA, FWAA, USAT, CBS, ESPN, Scout, SI, FOX)
- Vernon Hargreaves III, Florida (TSN, CBS, ESPN)
- Gerod Holliman, Louisville -- UNANIMOUS -- (AP, WCFF, TSN, AFCA, FWAA, USAT, CBS, ESPN, Scout, SI, FOX)
- Jalen Ramsey, Florida State (USAT, Scout)

== Special teams ==
=== Kicker ===
- Roberto Aguayo, Florida State -- CONSENSUS -- (AP, WCFF, TSN, AFCA, USAT, CBS, ESPN, Scout, SI, FOX)
- Brad Craddock, Maryland (FWAA)

=== Punter ===
- Tom Hackett, Utah -- CONSENSUS -- (AP, WCFF, AFCA, FWAA, CBS, Scout, FOX)
- J. K. Scott, Alabama (TSN, USAT, ESPN, SI)

=== All-purpose / return specialist ===
- Mario Alford, West Virginia (FWAA)
- Kaelin Clay, Utah (TSN, CBS, FOX)
- Tyler Lockett, Kansas State -- CONSENSUS -- (AFCA, FWAA, CBS, ESPN, Scout, SI, FOX)
- Marcus Murphy, Missouri (Scout)
- J. J. Nelson, UAB (WCFF, USAT, CBS, SI)
- Shaq Thompson, Washington (AP, Scout)

== See also ==
- 2014 All-Big 12 Conference football team
- 2014 All-Big Ten Conference football team
- 2014 All-Pac-12 Conference football team
- 2014 All-SEC football team
