= Tre' Jackson =

American football player (born 1992)

No. 63
- Position: Guard

Personal information
- Born: December 14, 1992 (age 33); Jesup, Georgia, U.S.
- Listed height: 6 ft 4 in (1.93 m)
- Listed weight: 315 lb (143 kg)

Career information
- High school: Wayne County (Jesup)
- College: Florida State
- NFL draft: 2015: 4th round, 111th overall pick

Career history
- New England Patriots (2015–2016); Los Angeles Rams (2017)*; Orlando Apollos (2019); Massachusetts Pirates (2019); Tampa Bay Vipers (2020)
- * Offseason or practice squad member only

Awards and highlights
- Super Bowl champion (LI); Second-team All-NAL (2019); BCS national champion (2013); Unanimous All-American (2014); 2× First-team All-ACC (2013, 2014)

Career NFL statistics
- Games played: 13
- Games started: 9
- Stats at Pro Football Reference

Tre' Jackson (born December 14, 1992) is an American former professional football player who was a guard in the National Football League (NFL). He played college football for the Florida State Seminoles, earning unanimous All-American honors in 2014. He was selected by the New England Patriots in the fourth round of the 2015 NFL draft.

== Early life ==
Jackson attended Wayne County High School in Jesup, Georgia, where he was a two-sport star in both track and football, where he was a two-way lineman. Jackson missed his entire junior season with an ACL tear. In his senior year, Jackson helped protect quarterback Greyson Lambert, as the Yellow Jackets went 5–5 on the season. Jackson was also one of the state's top performers in the shot put (top-throw of 57 ft 8 1/2 in or 17.59 m).

Having missed his junior season, Jackson drew little attention as he entered his final year of high school. Recruiting services largely overlooked him, as he had three-star ratings from Rivals.com, Scout.com, and ESPN. Jackson originally committed to Georgia Tech in October 2010, but changed his mind after getting offers from Miami (FL) and Florida State late in the season. After Jackson agreed to an official visit to Florida State, Georgia Tech head coach Paul Johnson rescinded his scholarship offer. In February 2011, Jackson finally committed to Florida State.

== College career ==
In his first year at Florida State, Jackson was expected to redshirt, especially after a groin injury caused him to miss the first five games of the season. But injuries to several Seminoles offensive linemen eventually moved him into the rotation, primarily on special teams but also at guard. His college debut came in a 41–16 win over Duke on October 15, registering eight snaps. After playing sparingly the rest of the season, he played all 62 snaps in the 18–14 Champs Sports Bowl win over Notre Dame. Jackson played well enough in the bowl game that head coach Jimbo Fisher penciled him in as a starting right guard. He eventually started all 14 games as a sophomore and earned the second-highest season grade among Seminoles offensive linemen, second only to Bryan Stork. Jackson's 22 knockdown blocks rank third on the team.

In his junior season, started another 14 games at right guard, including the 2014 BCS National Championship Game. The Seminoles finished the season 14–0 while setting school and conference season records for total offense (7,267 yards), points per game (51.6) and yards per play (7.67), and the national record for points (723), as freshman quarterback Jameis Winston became the youngest player ever to win the Heisman Trophy. Jackson was named a first team All-Atlantic Coast Conference (ACC) selection. Forgoing a chance to enter the 2014 NFL draft, Jackson returned his senior season and started all 14 games. He was again named a first team All-ACC, and was also a consensus All-American, the school's first since Rodney Hudson in 2010.

== Professional career ==
Pre-draft measurables
Height	Weight	Arm length	Hand span	40-yard dash	10-yard split	20-yard split	20-yard shuttle	Vertical jump	Broad jump	Bench press
6 ft 3 3/4 in (1.92 m)	330 lb (150 kg)	32 5/8 in (0.83 m)	10 7/8 in (0.28 m)	5.52 s	1.88 s	3.16 s	5.27 s	25 in (0.64 m)	8 ft 0 in (2.44 m)	20 reps
All values from NFL Combine and Pro Day

=== New England Patriots ===
Fox Sports ranked Jackson as the No. 4 offensive guard available in the 2015 NFL draft, behind only Laken Tomlinson, Ali Marpet, and A. J. Cann. He was drafted by the New England Patriots in the 4th round with the 111th pick overall in the 2015 NFL draft. He played in 13 games with nine starts at right guard his rookie year while dealing with a knee injury.

Jackson started the season on Physically unable to perform with a knee injury. Unfortunately, his injury never healed in time and missed the entire 2016 season. On February 5, 2017, Jackson's Patriots won Super Bowl LI. In the game, the Patriots defeated the Atlanta Falcons by a score of 34–28 in overtime.

On April 18, 2017, Jackson was released by the Patriots.

=== Los Angeles Rams ===
On April 19, 2017, Jackson was claimed off waivers by the Los Angeles Rams, but was waived two days later after failing his physical.

=== Orlando Apollos ===
On September 14, 2018, Jackson signed with the Orlando Apollos of the Alliance of American Football (AAF).

=== Massachusetts Pirates ===
After the dissolution of the AAF in April 2019, Jackson signed with the Massachusetts Pirates of the National Arena League (NAL) on May 17, 2019. Jackson was named to the second-team All-NAL for the 2019 season.

=== Tampa Bay Vipers ===
In October 2019, Jackson was selected by the Tampa Bay Vipers of the XFL in the 2020 XFL draft. He and linebacker Reggie Northrup were the two Seminoles on the Vipers draft class.
