= Jeremy Cash =

American football player (born 1992)

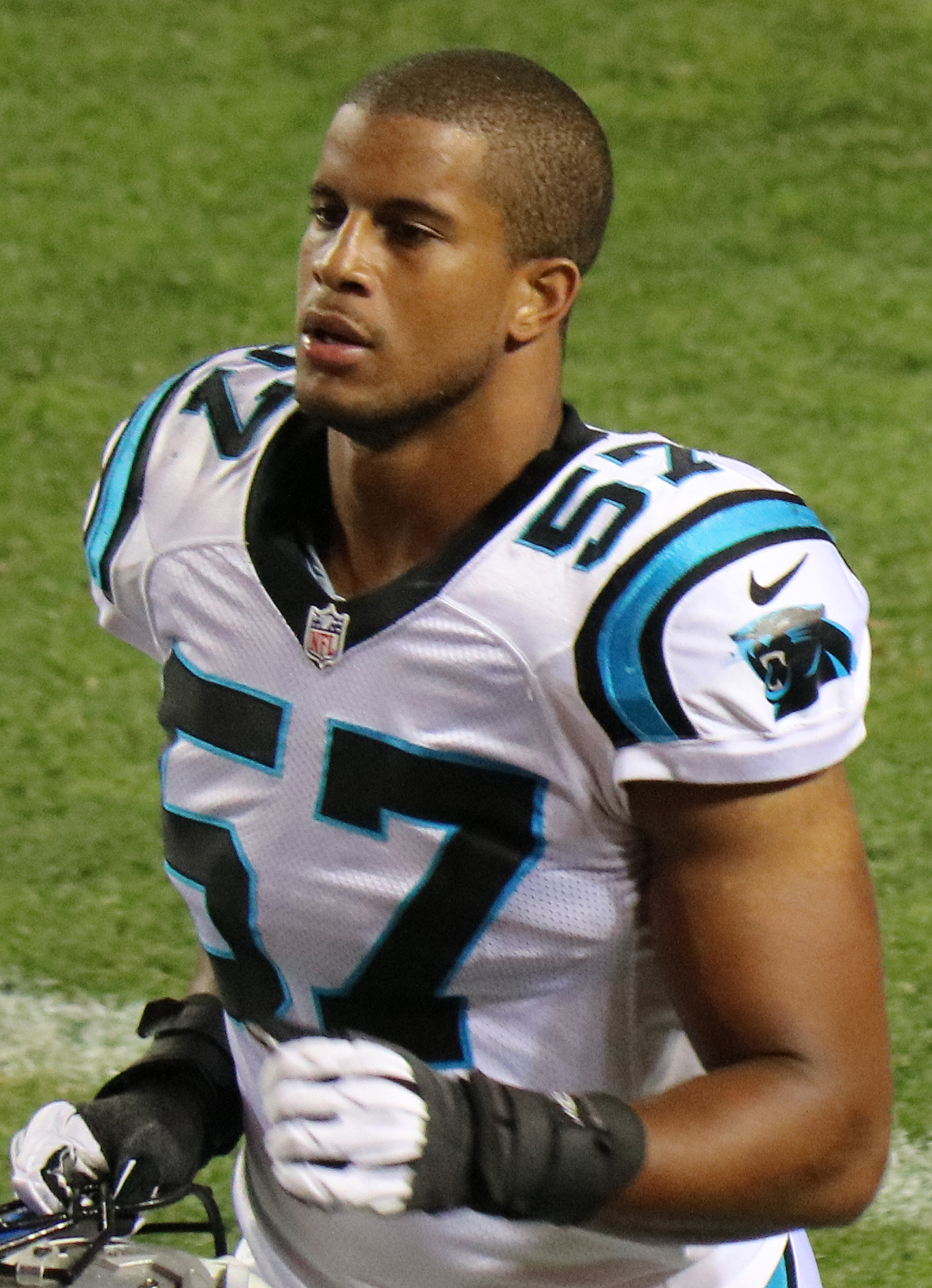
- Cash with the Carolina Panthers in 2016

No. 57, 48, 35, 52
- Position: Linebacker

Personal information
- Born: December 9, 1992 (age 33); Miami, Florida, U.S.
- Listed height: 6 ft 0 in (1.83 m)
- Listed weight: 230 lb (104 kg)

Career information
- High school: Plantation (Plantation, Florida)
- College: Duke
- NFL draft: 2016: undrafted

Career history
- Carolina Panthers (2016–2017); New York Jets (2017)*; New York Giants (2017); Cleveland Browns (2017); Arizona Cardinals (2018)
- * Offseason or practice squad member only

Awards and highlights
- Consensus All-American (2015); ACC Defensive Player of the Year (2015); 2× First-team All-ACC (2013, 2015); Second-team All-ACC (2014)

Career NFL statistics
- Total tackles: 6
- Stats at Pro Football Reference

Jeremy Cash (born December 9, 1992) is an American former professional football player who was a linebacker in the National Football League (NFL). He played college football for the Duke Blue Devils, and was signed by the Carolina Panthers as an undrafted free agent in 2016.

== Early life ==
Cash attended Plantation High School in Broward County, near Fort Lauderdale. As a sophomore, he posted 82 total tackles, nine sacks and an interception. As a junior, he collected 96 tackles, 23 of them for loss, 7 sacks, 2 interceptions, and 5 forced fumbles. As a senior in 2010, he missed five games due to a knee injury. Cash also lettered in basketball and track and field at Plantation, recording times of 11.76 seconds in the 100-meter dash and 24.06 in the 200-meter dash.

Cash was rated by Rivals.com as a three-star recruit and was charted as the No. 25 safety in the country. He committed to Ohio State University to play college football in the spring of his junior year (April 2010). The decision was based in large part on his comfort level with then-coach Jim Tressel. Cash bypassed his last semester in high school to enroll at Ohio State early, in January 2011. He also had scholarship offers from Florida State, Colorado, Nebraska, South Florida, Arizona State and Wisconsin before making his collegiate selection.

== College career ==
Cash attended Ohio State for one year. He played in five games and made three tackles. In January 2012, he transferred to Duke University. After sitting out 2012 due to NCAA transfer rules, Cash started all 13 games in 2013. He recorded 121 tackles and had three interceptions. He again started all 13 games in 2014 and recorded 111 tackles, two interceptions and 5.5 sacks. Cash considered entering the 2015 NFL draft, but decided to return to Duke for his senior year.

As a senior in 2015, Cash recorded 100 tackles, 18 tackles for loss, 2.5 sacks, eight quarterback pressures, four pass breakups, three forced fumbles, and one fumble recovery in 12 games. He earned multiple national defensive player of the week honors for racking up 12 total tackles, three tackles for loss, a quarterback sack and forcing two fumbles as Duke upset No. 20-ranked Georgia Tech, 34–20. Cash was named ACC Defensive Player of the Year on December 2, becoming the first Blue Devils player to earn the award since it debuted in 1993. He was the first Duke player to win either of the player of the year awards since running back Robert Baldwin was the offensive and overall player of the year in 1994. He received 19 votes, ahead of Clemson defensive end Shaq Lawson (13), Pittsburgh defensive end Ejuan Price (7), Florida State cornerback Jalen Ramsey (7), Louisville defensive end Sheldon Rankins (2), Virginia Tech defensive tackle Luther Maddy (1) and Virginia safety Quin Blanding (1).

He was also a finalist for the Lott Impact Trophy, the Chuck Bednarik Award, and the Jim Thorpe Award while earning Consensus All-American Honors. Cash was named Carmen Falcone MVP of Duke football at an award banquet. On December 16, 2015 it was announced that Cash would forgo Duke's Pinstripe Bowl against Indiana to have wrist surgery.

=== Statistics ===
Regular season statistics				Tackles					Interceptions						Fumbles		
Season	Team	GP	GS	Total	Solo	Ast	Sck	Tfl	PDef	Int	Yds	Avg	Lng	TDs	FF	FR	FR YDS
2011	Ohio State	5	0	3	2	1	0.0	0.0	0	0	0	0.0	0	0	0	0	0
2013	Duke	14	14	121	64	57	0.0	9.5	3	3	18	6.0	14	0	2	3	0
2014	Duke	13	13	111	68	43	5.5	10.5	7	2	38	19.0	23	0	4	1	0
2015	Duke	12	12	100	57	43	2.5	18.0	4	0	0	0.0	0	0	3	1	0
Totals		44	39	335	191	144	8.0	38.0	14	5	56	11.2	23	0	9	5	0

== Professional career ==
Once his collegiate career was finished, many analysts projected him to be drafted in the second or third round. He was invited to the combine but did not do any drills or workouts due to hamstring and wrist injuries. He was able to perform the bench press by the time Duke's Pro Day came and did 13 reps of 225 lbs. It was reported that ten teams showed up at Duke's Pro Day, including the Pittsburgh Steelers, Carolina Panthers, New Orleans Saints, Arizona Cardinals, and Atlanta Falcons. Cash was able to perform the position drills for scouts at his private workout. At the conclusion of the pre-draft process, Cash's projected draft position fell to the fourth or fifth round. Scouts said his best attributes were his size, physicality, and how well he plays in the box. His problems handling man coverage was his biggest issue.

Pre-draft measurables
Height	Weight	Arm length	Hand span	Bench press
6 ft 0 3/8 in (1.84 m)	212 lb (96 kg)	32 3/8 in (0.82 m)	10 in (0.25 m)	13 reps
All values are from NFL Combine/Pro Day

=== Carolina Panthers ===
After going undrafted in the 2016 NFL draft, Cash signed with the Carolina Panthers on May 2, 2016. As soon as the draft concluded, 20 NFL teams immediately contacted Cash and offered to sign him as an undrafted free agent. He chose to sign with the Panthers, who signed him as an outside linebacker and intended for him to play one of the hybrid linebacker roles that have become popular among NFL teams in recent years, like Deone Bucannon of the Arizona Cardinals and Mark Barron of the Los Angeles Rams, who have had success after switching from safety. Cash gained 16 pounds and ate 4-5 meals a day to prepare for the position. Throughout the preseason, he played well on special teams and played prominently on kick and punt coverage once the season began with all the linebacker roles taken by proven veterans.

On September 30, 2017, Cash was placed on injured reserve with a calf injury. He was released by the team on October 3.

=== New York Jets ===
On October 24, 2017, Cash was signed to the New York Jets' practice squad. He was released by New York on November 24.

=== New York Giants ===
On November 27, 2017, Cash was signed by the New York Giants. He was waived by New York on December 19.

=== Cleveland Browns ===
On December 20, 2017, Cash was claimed off waivers by the Cleveland Browns. He was released on March 15, 2018.

=== Arizona Cardinals ===
On March 16, 2018, Cash was claimed off waivers by the Arizona Cardinals. On August 13, Cash was waived/injured by the Cardinals after suffering a torn ACL and MCL during the preseason; he later reverted to the injured reserve list.
