= 2014 Atlantic Coast Conference football season =

2014 ACC football season
- League: NCAA Division I FBS (Football Bowl Subdivision)
- Sport: Football
- Duration: August 2014 to January 2015
- Teams: 14

Regular season
- Atlantic champions: Florida State
- Coastal champions: Georgia Tech

ACC Championship Game
- Champions: Florida State
- Runners-up: Georgia Tech
- Finals MVP: Dalvin Cook

ACC seasons
- ← 2013 2015 →

2014 Atlantic Coast Conference football standings
	Conf.			Overall
Team	W		L	W		L
Atlantic Division
No. T–5 Florida State x$^	8	–	0	13	–	1
No. 15 Clemson	6	–	2	10	–	3
No. 24 Louisville	5	–	3	9	–	4
Boston College	4	–	4	7	–	6
NC State	3	–	5	8	–	5
Syracuse	1	–	7	3	–	9
Wake Forest	1	–	7	3	–	9
Coastal Division
No. 8 Georgia Tech x	6	–	2	11	–	3
Duke	5	–	3	9	–	4
North Carolina	4	–	4	6	–	7
Pittsburgh	4	–	4	6	–	7
Miami (FL)	3	–	5	6	–	7
Virginia Tech	3	–	5	7	–	6
Virginia	3	–	5	5	–	7
Championship: Florida State 37, Georgia Tech 35
^ – College Football Playoff participant; $ – Conference champion; x – Division champion/co-champions; Rankings from AP Poll

The 2014 Atlantic Coast Conference football season was the 62nd season of college football play for the Atlantic Coast Conference (ACC). It was played from August 2014 to January 2015. 2014 was first season of play in the ACC for former American Athletic Conference member Louisville, which replaced ACC charter member Maryland after their move to the Big Ten Conference. Although the Notre Dame football program is not a member of the ACC, it has an agreement to play five ACC schools per season in football starting in 2014. This is in return for access to the non-College Football Playoff ACC bowl line-up. The Irish are not eligible for the ACC Championship Game.

The Atlantic Coast Conference consisted of 14 members in two divisions. The Atlantic Division consisted of Boston College, Clemson, Florida State, Louisville, North Carolina State, Syracuse, and Wake Forest. The Coastal Division consisted of Duke, Georgia Tech, Miami, North Carolina, Pittsburgh, Virginia, and Virginia Tech. The division champions, Florida State and Georgia Tech, met in December in the 2014 ACC Championship Game, played in Charlotte, North Carolina at Bank of America Stadium.

== Preseason ==
=== Preseason Poll ===
The 2014 ACC Preseason Poll was announced at the ACC Football Kickoff meetings in Greensboro, North Carolina on July 23. Miami was voted to win Coastal division while Florida State was voted to win the Atlantic division and the conference. Jameis Winston of Florida State was voted the Preseason ACC Player of the Year.

==== Atlantic Division poll ====
1. Florida State – 780 (104 first place votes)
2. Clemson – 660 (3)
3. Louisville – 564
4. Syracuse - 368
5. North Carolina State – 326
6. Boston College – 301
7. Wake Forest – 136

==== Coastal Division poll ====
1. Miami – 614 (26)
2. Duke – 597 (33)
3. Virginia Tech – 571 (23)
4. North Carolina – 570 (27)
5. Georgia Tech – 322 (1)
6. Pittsburgh - 319 (2)
7. Virginia – 142

==== Predicted ACC Championship Game Winner ====
1. Florida State – 104
2. Clemson – 2
3. Virginia Tech - 2

==== Preseason ACC Player of the Year ====
1. Jameis Winston, FSU - 99
2. Vic Beasley, CLEM - 6
3. Duke Johnson, MIA - 1
4. Jamison Crowder, DU - 1
5. Brenden Motley, VT - 1

=== Preseason All Conference Teams ===
==== Offense ====
Position	Player	School
Wide receiver	Jamison Crowder	Duke
Wide receiver	Rashad Greene	Florida State
Wide receiver	DeVante Parker	Louisville
Tight end	Nick O'Leary	Florida State
Tackle	Cameron Erving	Florida State
Tackle	Sean Hickey	Syracuse
Guard	Tre' Jackson	Florida State
Guard	Laken Tomlinson	Duke
Center	Andy Gallik	Boston College
Quarterback	Jameis Winston	Florida State
Running back	Duke Johnson	Miami
Running back	Karlos Williams	Florida State

==== Defense ====
Position	Player	School
Defensive end	Vic Beasley	Clemson
Defensive end	Mario Edwards Jr.	Florida State
Defensive tackle	Luther Maddy	Virginia Tech
Defensive tackle	Grady Jarrett	Clemson
Linebacker	Denzel Perryman	Miami
Linebacker	Kelby Brown	Duke
Linebacker	Stephone Anthony	Clemson
Cornerback	Kendall Fuller	Virginia Tech
Cornerback	P. J. Williams	Florida State
Safety	Anthony Harris	Virginia
Safety	Jeremy Cash	Duke

==== Specialist ====
Position	Player	School
Placekicker	Roberto Aguayo	Florida State
Punter	A. J. Hughes	Virginia Tech
Specialist	Ryan Switzer	North Carolina

== Coaches ==
The conference had two new head coaches for the 2014 football season. Wake Forest hired Dave Clawson from Bowling Green one week after 13-year coach Jim Grobe resigned after his fifth straight losing season. Wake Forest athletic director, Ron Wellman, stated that their preference was to hire someone with experience coaching a private school. Clawson previously coached at FCS Fordham and Richmond before leading FBS Bowling Green to three bowl appearances and a conference title in the past five years. Louisville also changed coaches prior to the 2014 season. Former head coach Charlie Strong left the Louisville program following the 2013 season to take the head coaching position at Texas. Following his departure, Louisville rehired former head coach Bobby Petrino to a seven-year contract. Petrino formerly coached Louisville from 2003 to 2006 before leaving to coach at Arkansas. He spent his 2013 season as the head coach of Western Kentucky, where he led the team to an 8–4 record.

Note: Stats shown are before the beginning of the season

Team	Head coach	Years at school	Overall record	Record at school	ACC record
Boston College	Steve Addazio	2	20–17	7–6	4–4
Clemson	Dabo Swinney	7	51–23	51–23	33–12
Duke	David Cutcliffe	7	75–73	31–44	15–33
Florida State	Jimbo Fisher	4	45–10	45–10	26–6
Georgia Tech	Paul Johnson	7	155–71	48–32	31–17
Louisville	Bobby Petrino	5	83–30	41–9	0–0
Miami	Al Golden	4	49–49	22–15	13–11
North Carolina	Larry Fedora	3	49–29	15–10	9–7
NC State	Dave Doeren	2	26–13	3–9	0–8
Pittsburgh	Paul Chryst	3	13–13	13–13	3–5
Syracuse	Scott Shafer	2	7–6	7–6	4–4
Virginia	Mike London	5	42–36	18–31	8–24
Virginia Tech	Frank Beamer	27	264-132–4	224–109–2	62–18
Wake Forest	Dave Clawson	1	90–80	0–0	0–0

== Rankings ==
Legend
	Improvement in ranking
	Drop in ranking
	Not ranked previous week
RV	Received votes but were not ranked in Top 25 of poll

		Pre	Wk 1	Wk 2	Wk 3	Wk 4	Wk 5	Wk 6	Wk 7	Wk 8	Wk 9	Wk 10	Wk 11	Wk 12	Wk 13	Wk 14	Wk 15	Final
Boston College	AP				RV	RV												
Boston College	C				RV	RV												
Boston College	CFP	Not released																
Clemson	AP	16	23	23	22	RV	RV	RV	24	21	22	19	18	RV	23	19	18	15
Clemson	C	16	24	24	24	RV	RV	25	22	20	21	19	17	RV	24	19	18	15
Clemson	CFP	Not released									21	21	19	22	21	18	17	
Duke	AP	RV	RV	RV	RV	RV			RV	RV	24	22	19	25	RV	RV	RV	
Duke	C	RV	RV	RV	RV	23	RV	RV	RV	RV	24	20	19	25	RV	RV	RV	
Duke	CFP	Not released									24	22	21					
Florida State	AP	1	1	1	1	1	1	1	2	2	2	2	2	1	1	2	2	5
Florida State	C	1	1	1	1	1	2	1	2	2	2	2	2	1	2	2	2	6
Florida State	CFP	Not released									2	2	3	3	3	4	3	
Georgia Tech	AP					RV	RV	22	RV			RV	24	17	16	12	10	8
Georgia Tech	C	RV				RV	RV	23	RV		RV	RV	23	16	15	12	9	7
Georgia Tech	CFP	Not released										24	22	18	16	11	12	
Louisville	AP	RV	25	21	RV	RV		RV	RV	RV	RV	RV	RV	RV	24	21	20	24
Louisville	C	RV	RV	RV	RV	RV	RV	RV			RV	RV	RV	RV	23	20	20	24
Louisville	CFP	Not released									25			24	22	21	21	
Miami	AP	RV											RV	RV				
Miami	C	RV										RV	RV	RV				
Miami	CFP	Not released																
North Carolina	AP	23	21	RV	RV													
North Carolina	C	23	23	25	25		RV											
North Carolina	CFP	Not released																
NC State	AP						RV											
NC State	C				RV	RV												
NC State	CFP	Not released																
Pittsburgh	AP		RV	RV	RV	RV												
Pittsburgh	C		RV	RV	RV													
Pittsburgh	CFP	Not released																
Syracuse	AP																	
Syracuse	C																	
Syracuse	CFP	Not released																
Virginia	AP				RV		RV	RV	RV									
Virginia	C				RV													
Virginia	CFP	Not released																
Virginia Tech	AP	RV	RV	17	RV													
Virginia Tech	C	RV	RV	19	RV													
Virginia Tech	CFP	Not released																
Wake Forest	AP																	
Wake Forest	C																	
Wake Forest	CFP	Not released																

== Notre Dame partnership ==
Starting in 2014, Notre Dame is scheduled to play five games against ACC opponents annually. Each ACC team will play Notre Dame at least once during a three-year period. Due to scheduling constraints however, the 2014 Notre Dame team will only play four ACC opponents, but will play six in 2015 to even out the schedule.

Date	Time	Visiting team	Home team	Site	TV	Result	Attendance	Ref.
September 27	8:00 pm	No. 8 Notre Dame	Syracuse	MetLife Stadium • East Rutherford, NJ	ABC	L 15–31	76,802	
October 11	3:30 pm	North Carolina	No. 6 Notre Dame	Notre Dame Stadium • South Bend, IN	NBC	L 43–50	80,795	
October 18	8:00 pm	No. 5 Notre Dame	No. 2 Florida State	Doak Campbell Stadium • Tallahassee, FL	ABC	W 31–27	82,431	
November 22	3:30 pm	Louisville	Notre Dame	Notre Dame Stadium • South Bend, IN	NBC	W 31–28	80,795	
^{#}Rankings from AP Poll released prior to game. All times are in Eastern Time.

== Bowl games ==
=== Bowl eligibility ===
Bowl eligible

- Boston College
- Clemson
- Duke
- Florida State
- Georgia Tech
- Louisville
- Miami
- NC State
- North Carolina
- Pittsburgh
- Virginia Tech

Bowl ineligible

- Syracuse
- Wake Forest
- Virginia

=== Bowl Results ===
Bowl game	Date	Site	Television	Time (EST)	ACC team	Opponent	Score	Attendance
Quick Lane Bowl	December 26	Ford Field • Detroit, MI	ESPN	4:30 p.m.	North Carolina	Rutgers	RUT 21–40	23,876
Bitcoin St. Petersburg Bowl	December 26	Tropicana Field • St. Petersburg, FL	ESPN	8:00 p.m.	NC State	UCF	NCSU 34–27	26,675
Military Bowl Presented by Northrop Grumman	December 27	Navy–Marine Corps Memorial Stadium • Annapolis, MD	ESPN	1:00 p.m.	Virginia Tech	Cincinnati	VT 33–17	34,277
Hyundai Sun Bowl	December 27	Sun Bowl Stadium • El Paso, TX	CBS	2:00 p.m.	Duke	#15 Arizona State	ASU 31–36	34,780
Duck Commander Independence Bowl	December 27	Independence Stadium • Shreveport, LA	ABC	3:30 p.m.	Miami	South Carolina	USC 21–24	38,242
New Era Pinstripe Bowl	December 27	Yankee Stadium • New York, NY	ESPN	4:30 p.m.	Boston College	Penn State	PSU 30–31 (OT)	49,012
Russell Athletic Bowl	December 29	Orlando Citrus Bowl Stadium • Orlando, FL	ESPN	5:30 p.m.	#17 Clemson	Oklahoma	CLEM 40–6	40,071
Belk Bowl	December 30	Bank of America Stadium • Charlotte, NC	ESPN	6:30 p.m.	#21 Louisville	#13 Georgia	UGA 14–37	45,671
Lockheed Martin Armed Forces Bowl	January 2	Amon G. Carter Stadium • Fort Worth, TX	ESPN	12:00 p.m.	Pittsburgh	Houston	HOU 34–35	37,888
College Football Playoff bowl games
Capital One Orange Bowl	December 31	Sun Life Stadium • Miami Gardens, FL	ESPN	8:00 p.m.	#12 Georgia Tech	#7 Mississippi State	GT 49–34	58,211
Rose Bowl Game presented by Northwestern Mutual	January 1	Rose Bowl • Pasadena, CA	ESPN	5:10 p.m.	#3 Florida State	#2 Oregon	ORE 59–20	91,322

== Postseason ==
=== All-conference teams ===
The following players were selected to the All-ACC teams for 2014.

First Team

Position	Player	Class	Team
First Team Offense
QB	Jameis Winston	So (redshirt)	Florida State
RB	James Conner	So	Pittsburgh
RB	Duke Johnson	Jr	Miami
WR	Rashad Greene	Sr	Florida State
WR	Jamison Crowder	Sr	Duke
WR	Tyler Boyd	So	Pittsburgh
TE	Nick O'Leary	Sr	Florida State
T	Cameron Erving	Sr (redshirt)	Florida State
T	T. J. Clemmings	Sr (redshirt)	Pittsburgh
G	Laken Tomlinson	Sr (redshirt)	Duke
G	Tre' Jackson	Sr	Florida State
C	Andy Gallik	Sr (redshirt)	Boston College
First Team Defense
DE	Vic Beasley	Sr (redshirt)	Clemson
DE	Mario Edwards Jr.	Jr	Florida State
DT	Eddie Goldman	Jr	Florida State
DT	Grady Jarrett	Sr	Clemson
LB	Denzel Perryman	Sr	Miami
LB	David Helton	Sr	Duke
LB	Stephone Anthony	Sr	Clemson
CB	Kendall Fuller	So	Virginia Tech
CB	P. J. Williams	Jr	Florida State
S	Gerod Holliman	So (redshirt)	Louisville
S	Jalen Ramsey	So	Florida State
First Team Special Teams
PK	Roberto Aguayo	So (redshirt)	Florida State
P	Wil Baumann	Sr	NC State
SP	Jamison Crowder	Sr	Duke

Second Team

Position	Player	Class	Team
Second Team Offense
QB	Marquise Williams	Jr	North Carolina
RB	Zach Laskey	Sr	Georgia Tech
RB	Dalvin Cook	So	Florida State
WR	Phillip Dorsett	Sr (redshirt)	Miami
WR	Mike Williams	So	Clemson
WR	Artavis Scott	Fr	Clemson
TE	Clive Walford	Sr (redshirt)	Miami
T	Ereck Flowers	Jr	Miami
T	Jamon Brown	Sr	Louisville
G	Shaq Mason	Sr	Georgia Tech
G	Josue Matías	Jr	Florida State
C	Cameron Erving	Sr (redshirt)	Florida State
Second Team Defense
DE	Dadi Nicolas	Jr (redshirt)	Virginia Tech
DE	Eli Harold	Jr	Virginia
DT	Adam Gotsis	Jr	Georgia Tech
DT	Tylor Harris	Jr	Wake Forest
LB	Terrance Smith	Jr (redshirt)	Florida State
LB	Lorenzo Mauldin	Sr	Louisville
LB	Henry Coley^	Sr (redshirt)	Virginia
LB	Quayshawn Nealy^	Sr (redshirt)	Georgia Tech
CB	Garry Peters	Sr	Clemson
CB	Maurice Canady	Jr	Virginia
S	Jeremy Cash	Jr (redshirt)	Duke
S	Quin Blanding	Fr	Virginia
Second Team Special Teams
PK	Ian Frye	Jr (redshirt)	Virginia
P	Alex Kinal	Jr (redshirt)	Wake Forest
SP	Tyler Boyd	So	Pittsburgh

Third Team

Position	Player	Class	Team
Third Team Offense
QB	Justin Thomas	So	Georgia Tech
RB	Kevin Parks	Sr	Virginia
RB	Jon Hilliman	Fr	Boston College
WR	DeAndre Smelter	Sr (redshirt)	Georgia Tech
WR	DeVante Parker	Sr	Louisville
WR	Ryan Switzer	So	North Carolina
TE	Bucky Hodges	Fr (redshirt)	Virginia Tech
T	Sean Hickey	Sr	Syracuse
T	Bobby Hart^	Sr	Florida State
T	Seth Betancourt^	Sr (redshirt)	Boston College
T	Takoby Cofield^	Sr (redshirt)	Duke
G	Landon Turner	Jr	North Carolina
G	Matt Rotheram	Sr (redshirt)	Pittsburgh
C	Matt Skura	Jr (redshirt)	Duke
Third Team Defense
DE	Sheldon Rankins	Jr	Louisville
DE	Ken Ekanem	So (redshirt)	Virginia Tech
DT	Corey Marshall	Jr (redshirt)	Virginia Tech
DT	Connor Wujciak	Jr	Boston College
LB	Reggie Northrup	Jr	Florida State
LB	Cameron Lynch	Sr	Syracuse
LB	Max Valles	So (redshirt)	Virginia
CB	Ronald Darby	Jr	Florida State
CB	Charles Gaines	Jr (redshirt)	Louisville
S	Anthony Harris	Sr	Virginia
S	Jamal Golden	Jr	Georgia Tech
Third Team Special Teams
PK	Ross Martin	Jr	Duke
P	Justin Vogel	So	Miami
SP	DeVon Edwards	So	Duke

^ indicates that there was a tie in the voting

=== ACC Individual Awards ===
ACC Player of the Year

RB James Conner - Pittsburgh

Rookie of the Year

QB Brad Kaaya - Miami

Coach of the Year

Paul Johnson - Georgia Tech

Offensive Player of the Year

RB James Conner - Pittsburgh

Offensive Rookie of the Year

QB Brad Kaaya - Miami

Brian Piccolo Award

RB Duke Johnson - Miami

Jacobs Blocking Trophy

T Cameron Erving - Florida State

Defensive Player of the Year

DT Vic Beasley - Clemson

Defensive Rookie of the Year

S Quin Blanding - Virginia

Jim Tatum Award

LB David Helton - Duke

=== National Awards ===
John Mackey Award

TE Nick O'Leary- Florida State

Jim Thorpe Award

S Gerod Holliman- Louisville

Campbell Trophy

LB David Helton- Duke
