= Gerod Holliman =

American football player (born 1994)

Profile
- Position: Safety

Personal information
- Born: May 6, 1994 (age 32); Miami, Florida, U.S.
- Listed height: 6 ft 0 in (1.83 m)
- Listed weight: 218 lb (99 kg)

Career information
- High school: Miami Southridge
- College: Louisville
- NFL draft: 2015: 7th round, 239th overall pick

Career history
- Pittsburgh Steelers (2015)*; Tampa Bay Buccaneers (2015–2016)*; Columbus Lions (2018); High Country Grizzlies (2019); Louisville Xtreme (2021); Bismarck Bucks (2022)
- * Offseason or practice squad member only

Awards and highlights
- Jim Thorpe Award (2014); Jack Tatum Trophy (2014); Unanimous All-American (2014); First-team All-ACC (2014)
- Stats at Pro Football Reference

Gerod Holliman (born May 6, 1994) is an American former professional football safety. He played college football for the Louisville Cardinals, winning the Jim Thorpe Award as the nation's top defensive back and earning unanimous All-American honors in 2014, when he tied the NCAA record for most interceptions (14) in a season, set by Al Worley, University of Washington, in 1968. He was selected by the Pittsburgh Steelers in the seventh round of the 2015 NFL draft. Holliman was also a member of the Tampa Bay Buccaneers, Columbus Lions, High Country Grizzlies, Louisville Xtreme and Bismarck Bucks.

== Early life ==
Holliman attended Miami Southridge High School in Miami, Florida, where he played football mainly as a safety. As a senior, he led Dade County with 12 interceptions, returning five for touchdowns. In a game vs. Coral Reef, he recorded an 80-yard kickoff return for a touchdown, a 38-yard interception return for a score, caught six passes for 78 yards and rushed six times for 118 yards, including a 70-yard touchdown run. In track & field, Holliman posted personal-best times of 23.5 seconds in the 200-meter dash and 53.84 seconds in the 400-meter dash as a senior.

After high school, Holliman attended Milford Academy for a year.

Regarded as a four-star recruit by Rivals.com, Holliman was ranked as the second best safety in his class. He was ranked as a four-star prospect and the No. 10 safety according to Scout.com. He was considered one of the hardest hitters in the state of Florida, and was ranked 49th on ESPN.com's Top 150 and was viewed as the third-ranked safety. He was rated by 247Sports.com as the 107th-best prospect, the sixth-best safety and the 21st-ranked player in the state. He also ranked 193rd on Tom Lemming's list. Described as a safety prospect who seems to always be around the ball, great at diagnosing the run plays versus passes and quick to come up and hit a running back, he originally committed to the University of Mississippi to play college football, but changed it to the University of Louisville. He also received scholarship offers from Cincinnati, Miami, West Virginia, Tennessee and Nebraska, among others.

== College career ==
As a true freshman at Louisville in 2012, Holliman played in only three games due to a shoulder injury. As a redshirt freshman in 2013, he played in 11 games with two starts and recorded 16 tackles. Holliman became a first year starter as a redshirt sophomore in 2014. He finished the season with an NCAA record-tying 14 interceptions. He won the Jim Thorpe Award and was named a unanimous All-American.

After his junior season, Holliman entered the 2015 NFL draft.

== Professional career ==
Pre-draft measurables
Height	Weight	Arm length	Hand span	40-yard dash	10-yard split	20-yard split	20-yard shuttle	Three-cone drill	Vertical jump	Broad jump	Bench press
5 ft 11 3/4 in (1.82 m)	218 lb (99 kg)	32 in (0.81 m)	9 1/2 in (0.24 m)	4.62 s	1.58 s	2.71 s	4.37 s	7.03 s	27.0 in (0.69 m)	9 ft 1 in (2.77 m)	17 reps
All values from NFL Combine and Pro Day

=== Pittsburgh Steelers ===
Holliman was selected by the Pittsburgh Steelers in the seventh round of the 2015 NFL draft with the 239th overall pick. He was released on September 5, 2015.

=== Tampa Bay Buccaneers ===
Holliman was signed to the practice squad of the Tampa Bay Buccaneers on December 30, 2015. He signed a reserve/future contract with the team on January 5, 2016. He was released by the Buccaneers on April 29, 2016.

=== Columbus Lions ===
On August 15, 2017, Holliman signed with the Columbus Lions of the National Arena League for the 2018 season.

=== Bismarck Bucks ===
On May 4, 2022, Holliman signed with the Bismarck Bucks of the Indoor Football League (IFL). On June 15, 2022, Holliman was put on the RTR list by the Bucks. In turn, making him a free agent.
