= Andy Gallik =

American football player (born 1991)

No. 69
- Position: Center

Personal information
- Born: September 24, 1991 (age 35); Evergreen Park, Illinois, U.S.
- Listed height: 6 ft 2 in (1.88 m)
- Listed weight: 299 lb (136 kg)

Career information
- High school: Brother Rice (Chicago, Illinois)
- College: Boston College
- NFL draft: 2015: 6th round, 208th overall pick

Career history
- Tennessee Titans (2015–2016)

Awards and highlights
- First-team All-ACC (2014)

Career NFL statistics
- Games played: 12
- Games started: 8
- Stats at Pro Football Reference

Andy A. Gallik (born September 24, 1991) is an American former professional football player who was a center in the National Football League (NFL). He played college football for Boston College Eagles and was selected by the Tennessee Titans in the 2015 NFL draft.

== Early life and college ==
Gallik was born in Evergreen Park, Illinois. Gallik attended Brother Rice High School in Chicago. He attended Boston College, where he started all four years for the Eagles.

== Professional career ==
Gallik was selected by the Tennessee Titans in the sixth round of the 2015 NFL draft with the 208th overall pick. On August 28, 2016, he was waived/injured by the Titans and placed on injured reserve. He was released with an injury settlement on October 14, 2016.

Pre-draft measurables
Height	Weight	Arm length	Hand span	40-yard dash	20-yard shuttle	Three-cone drill	Vertical jump	Broad jump	Bench press
6 ft 2 in (1.88 m)	306 lb (139 kg)	32 in (0.81 m)	10 in (0.25 m)	5.50 s	4.58 s	7.66 s	27 in (0.69 m)	9 ft 6 in (2.90 m)	29 reps
All values from NFL Combine,
