= Cameron Erving =

American football player (born 1992)

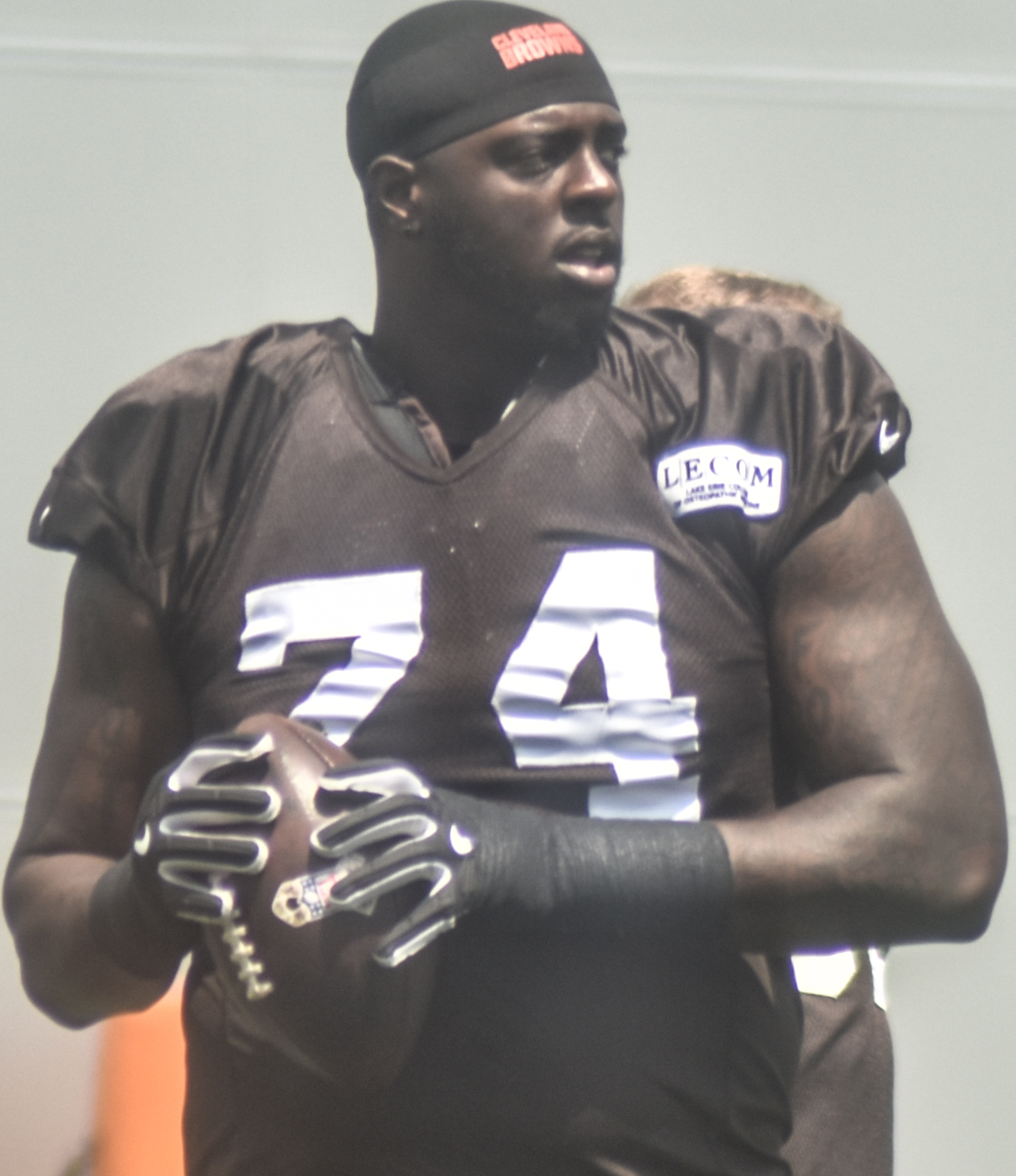
- Erving with the Cleveland Browns in 2016

Profile
- Position: Offensive tackle

Personal information
- Born: August 23, 1992 (age 34); Moultrie, Georgia, U.S.
- Listed height: 6 ft 5 in (1.96 m)
- Listed weight: 315 lb (143 kg)

Career information
- High school: Colquitt County (Norman Park, Georgia)
- College: Florida State (2010–2014)
- NFL draft: 2015: 1st round, 19th overall pick

Career history
- Cleveland Browns (2015–2016); Kansas City Chiefs (2017–2019); Dallas Cowboys (2020); Carolina Panthers (2021–2022); New Orleans Saints (2023); Houston Texans (2024)*; San Francisco 49ers (2024)*; Philadelphia Eagles (2024)*
- * Offseason or practice squad member only

Awards and highlights
- Super Bowl champion (LIV); BCS national champion (2013); First-team All-American (2013); First-team All-ACC (2013); Second-team All-ACC (2014)

Career NFL statistics
- Games played: 98
- Games started: 58
- Stats at Pro Football Reference

Cameron Drew Erving (born August 23, 1992) is an American professional football offensive tackle. He was selected in the first round of the 2015 NFL draft by the Cleveland Browns. He played college football for the Florida State Seminoles and has played in the NFL for the Browns, Kansas City Chiefs, Dallas Cowboys, Carolina Panthers, and New Orleans Saints.

== Early life ==
Erving attended Colquitt County High School, where he played as a defensive tackle. He had 98 tackles (48 solo) as a senior.

== College career ==
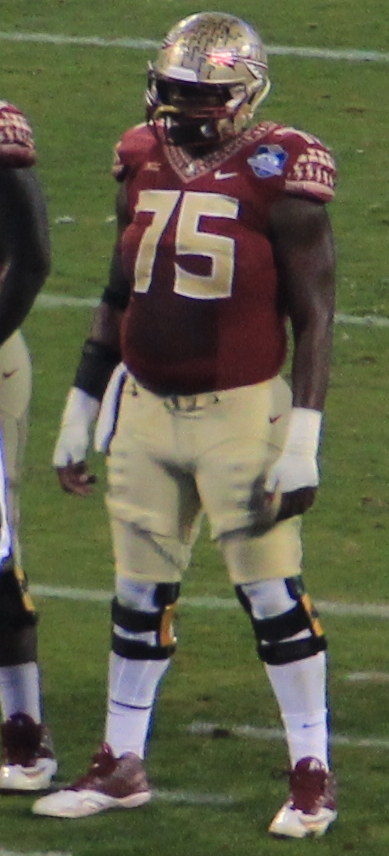
Erving playing for Florida State in 2014

Erving accepted a football scholarship from Florida State University. He played in three games as a defensive tackle as a true freshman in 2010. He recorded one tackle before a back injury caused him to have a medical redshirt.

He was a backup defensive tackle and played in all 13 games as a redshirt freshman in 2011. He finished the season with 20 tackles and one sack.

Erving was moved to offensive tackle as a sophomore in 2012. He started all 14 games at left tackle, protecting quarterback EJ Manuel's blind side.

As a junior in 2013, Erving was a first-team All-Atlantic Coast Conference (ACC) selection at left tackle, after protecting quarterback Jameis Winston's blind side, who became the youngest player ever to win the Heisman Trophy. He was also named a second-team All-American by the Associated Press.

He began his senior season in 2014 as the starting left tackle, but was moved to center after Austin Barron suffered an arm injury in the fifth game against Wake Forest University.

Erving made 42 consecutive starts on the offensive line during his college career. He is a member of the Florida State chapter of Phi Delta Theta fraternity.

== Professional career ==
Pre-draft measurables
Height	Weight	Arm length	Hand span	Wingspan	40-yard dash	10-yard split	20-yard split	20-yard shuttle	Three-cone drill	Vertical jump	Broad jump	Bench press
6 ft 5 1/2 in (1.97 m)	313 lb (142 kg)	34 1/8 in (0.87 m)	10 3/8 in (0.26 m)	7 ft 0 1/8 in (2.14 m)	5.15 s	1.87 s	3.03 s	4.63 s	7.48 s	30.5 in (0.77 m)	9 ft 4 in (2.84 m)	30 reps
All values from NFL Combine

=== Cleveland Browns ===
On April 30, 2015, Erving was selected with the 19th overall pick by the Cleveland Browns in the 2015 NFL draft. Erving signed a four-year contract worth roughly $10 million, with a signing bonus of about $5 million. As a rookie, he spent time at right guard and left tackle during training camp. He appeared in 16 games with 4 starts at left guard.

In 2016, after longtime starting center Alex Mack left the Browns via free agency, the coaching staff switched Erving from guard to center as his replacement. He sat out three games after suffering a bruised lung in the second game against the Baltimore Ravens. He started 12 games at center, but struggled with his level of play and with his shotgun snaps. He was moved to the right tackle position for the season finale in place of Austin Pasztor, but suffered an MCL injury during the game against the Pittsburgh Steelers.

In 2017, he was competing for the right tackle starting position with Shon Coleman. He struggled during training camp and also suffered a calf injury.

=== Kansas City Chiefs ===
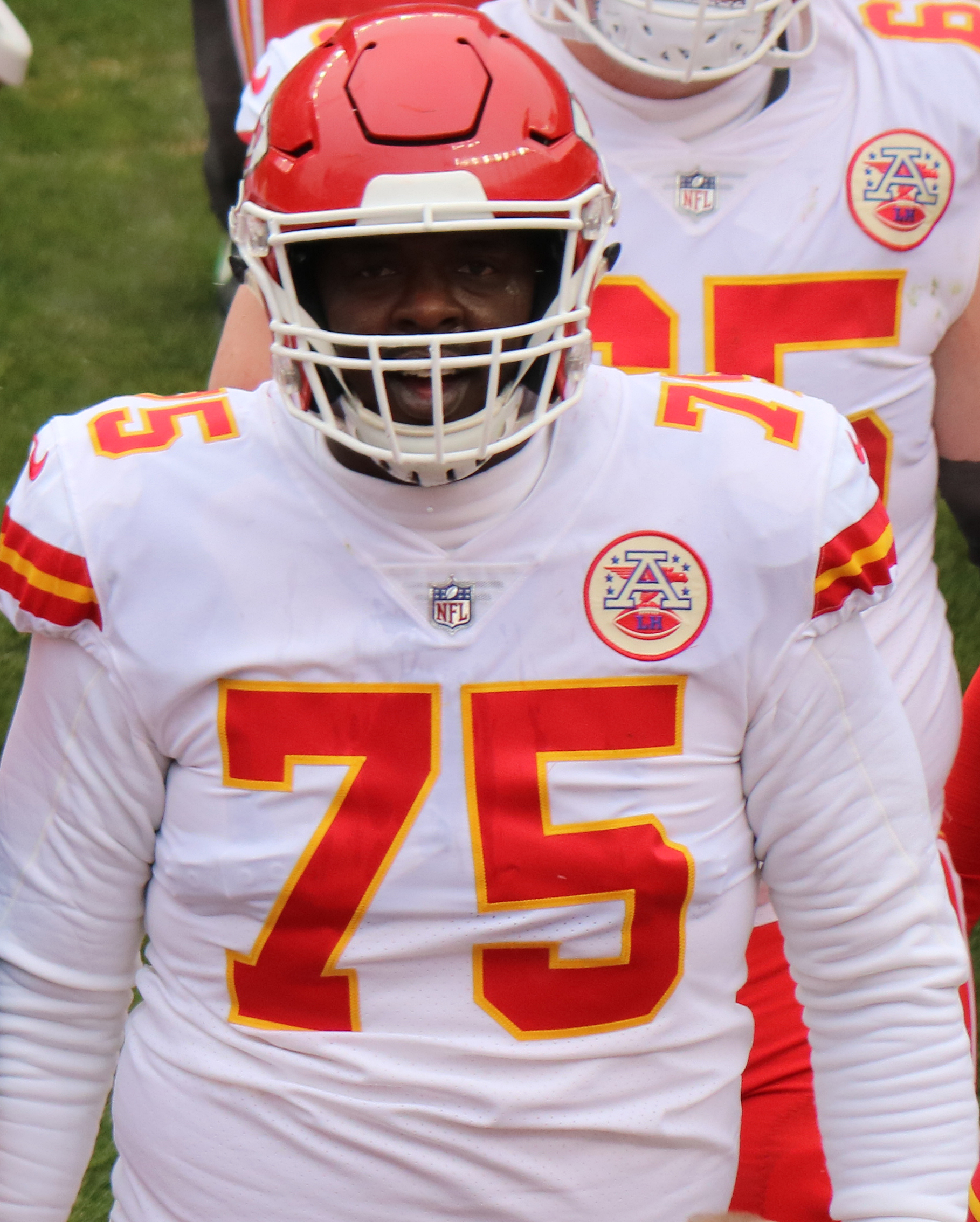
Erving with the Kansas City Chiefs in 2017

On August 30, 2017, Erving was traded to the Kansas City Chiefs for a 2018 fifth-round pick (#159-Daurice Fountain). He played in 13 games, making four starts (three at right guard and one at left tackle).

On May 2, 2018, the Chiefs declined the fifth-year option on Erving's contract. On September 4, 2018, Erving signed a two-year contract extension with the Chiefs. Although he was considered to be at risk of making the team, he earned the starting left guard position during training camp. He appeared in 14 games with 13 starts.

In 2019, he started eight games at left tackle, while Eric Fisher recovered from a sports-hernia surgery. Erving won his first championship when the Chiefs defeated the San Francisco 49ers 31–20 in Super Bowl LIV.

The Chiefs declined the 2020 option on Erving's contract, making him a free agent.

=== Dallas Cowboys ===
On May 6, 2020, Erving signed a one-year contract with the Dallas Cowboys, to compete for the swing tackle position. He missed most of training camp with an undisclosed injury, returning to activity until August 27. Because of the season-ending hip injury to La'el Collins, he competed for the starting right tackle position, but was passed on the depth chart by rookie Terence Steele. In the season opener against the Los Angeles Rams, he sprained the medial collateral ligament in his left knee while blocking for a field goal attempt. On September 15, he was placed on injured reserve with a sprained knee. He was designated to return from injured reserve on October 7, and began practicing with the team again. He was activated on October 24.

In the seventh game against the Washington Football Team, he was named the starter at left tackle, replacing Brandon Knight who had a knee injury. In the eleventh game against the Washington Football Team, he suffered a sprained right knee injury on the opening series and was replaced with Knight. On December 11, 2020, he was placed back on injured reserve, making him ineligible to return during the season. He appeared in 6 games with 5 starts at left tackle.

=== Carolina Panthers ===
On March 17, 2021, Erving signed a two-year contract with the Carolina Panthers. He was named the Panthers starting left tackle for 2021. He suffered a calf injury in Week 9 and was placed on injured reserve on November 8, 2021. He was activated on December 11. He started 9 games at left tackle.

In 2022, he appeared in 11 games as a reserve player and the team's swing tackle, while mentoring rookie offensive tackle Ikem Ekwonu.

On May 9, 2023. Erving re-signed with the Panthers on a one-year contract. On August 29, 2023, he was released for final roster cuts before the start of the 2023 season.

=== New Orleans Saints ===
On October 4, 2023, Erving was signed to the practice squad of the New Orleans Saints. He played his first game for the Saints against the Jacksonville Jaguars on October 19, 2023, as the starting right tackle. He was signed to the active roster on December 30.

=== Houston Texans ===
On August 3, 2024, Erving signed with the Houston Texans. He was released on August 27, and re-signed to the practice squad. He was released on September 13. He was re-signed on November 12, but released a week later.

=== San Francisco 49ers ===
On November 27, 2024, Erving was signed to the San Francisco 49ers' practice squad. He was released by San Francisco on November 29.

=== Philadelphia Eagles ===
On January 22, 2025, the Philadelphia Eagles signed Erving to their practice squad, but was released three days later.
