= Laken Tomlinson =

American football player (born 1992)

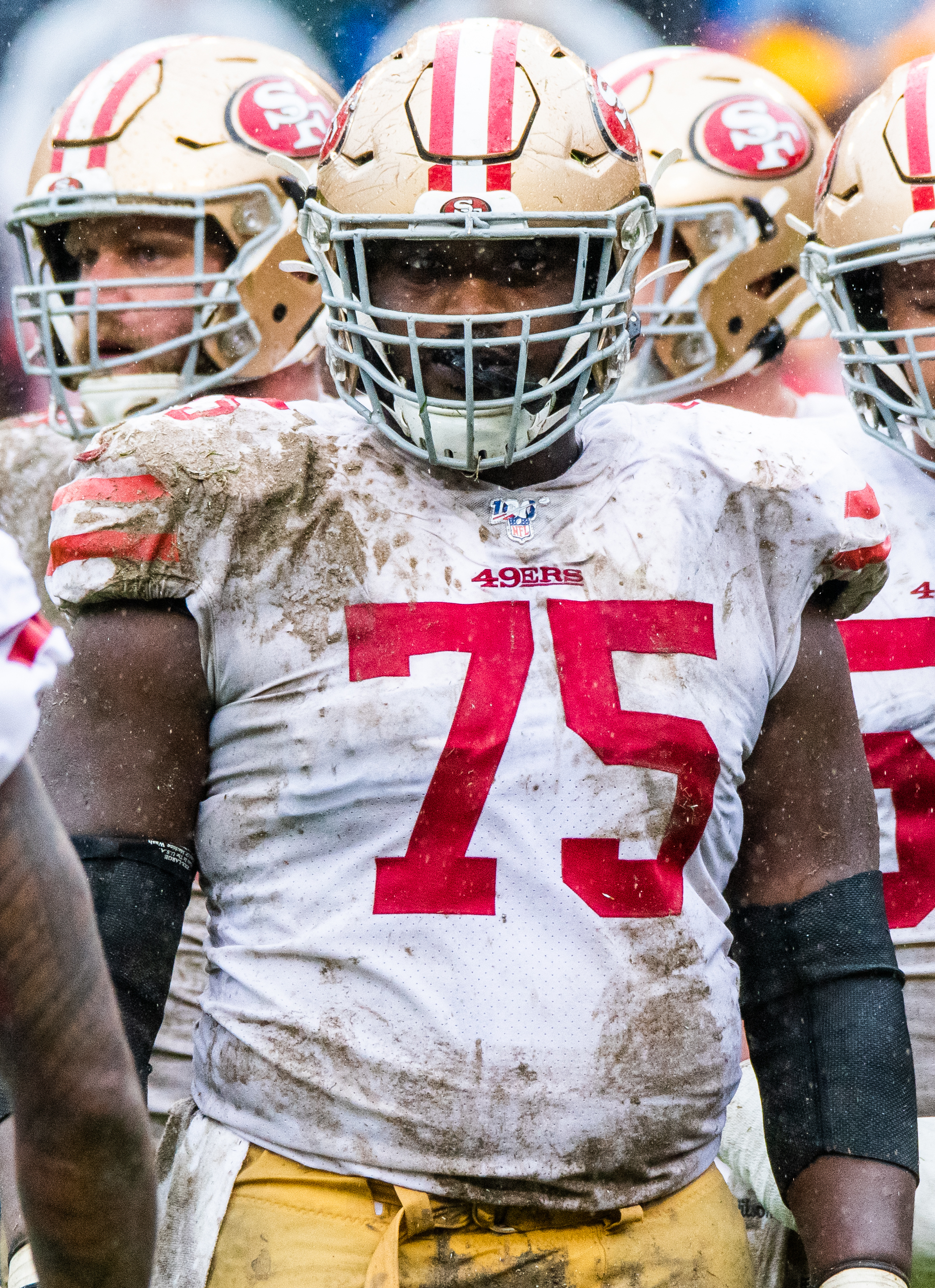
- Tomlinson with the San Francisco 49ers in 2019

No. 72 – Green Bay Packers
- Position: Guard
- Roster status: Active

Personal information
- Born: February 9, 1992 (age 34); Savanna-la-Mar, Jamaica
- Listed height: 6 ft 3 in (1.91 m)
- Listed weight: 316 lb (143 kg)

Career information
- High school: Lane Tech (Chicago, Illinois, U.S.)
- College: Duke (2010–2014)
- NFL draft: 2015: 1st round, 28th overall pick

Career history
- Detroit Lions (2015–2016); San Francisco 49ers (2017–2021); New York Jets (2022–2023); Seattle Seahawks (2024); Houston Texans (2025); Baltimore Ravens (2025)*; Dallas Cowboys (2026)*; Green Bay Packers (2026–present)
- * Offseason or practice squad member only

Awards and highlights
- Pro Bowl (2021); Consensus All-American (2014); Anthony J. McKevlin Award (2015); First-team All-ACC (2014); Second-team All-ACC (2013)

Career NFL statistics as of Week 10, 2026
- Games played: 180
- Games started: 169
- Stats at Pro Football Reference

Laken Tomlinson (born February 9, 1992) is a Jamaican-American professional football guard for the Green Bay Packers of the National Football League (NFL). He played college football for the Duke Blue Devils. He was selected by the Detroit Lions in the first round of the 2015 NFL draft.

== Early life ==
Tomlinson was born on February 9, 1992, in Savanna-la-Mar, a town in the Westmoreland Parish of Cornwall County, Jamaica. He immigrated to the United States with his family at a young age, settling in Chicago, Illinois in March 2003. He grew up in the Rogers Park neighborhood and attended Lane Technical College Prep High School in Roscoe Village, where he was a two-sport star in both football and track. He was an All-state selection as a senior by both the Illinois High School Football Coaches Association and Chicago Tribune. He was named the team MVP as a senior. He was a two-time All-city selection. He was also a four-time first-team All-conference selection. He helped lead his high school team to the 2008 Chicago Public League football championship.

In addition, Tomlinson lettered in track & field at Lane. At the 2009 Chicago Public League T&F Championship, he placed first in the discus throw (140-06 or 42.9m) and second in the shot put. In the 2009 Illinois 3A State T&F Championship meet, he threw personal-bests of 43.01 meters (141-1) in the discus and 14.58 meters (47-7) in the shot put to place 17th and 22nd, respectively, in the preliminary heats.

== College career ==
Tomlinson attended Duke University from 2010 to 2014. He became a starter his freshman season and started 52 games during his collegiate career. As a senior, he was named an All-American by Walter Camp Football Foundation (WCFF). He was named the men's ACC Athlete of the Year by winning the Anthony J. McKevlin Award in 2015.

== Professional career ==
Pre-draft measurables
Height	Weight	Arm length	Hand span	Wingspan	40-yard dash	10-yard split	20-yard split	20-yard shuttle	Three-cone drill	Vertical jump	Broad jump	Bench press
6 ft 3 3/8 in (1.91 m)	323 lb (147 kg)	33 5/8 in (0.85 m)	10 1/8 in (0.26 m)	6 ft 10 3/4 in (2.10 m)	5.22 s	1.75 s	2.94 s	4.71 s	7.77 s	31.5 in (0.80 m)	9 ft 0 in (2.74 m)	25 reps
All values from NFL Combine/Pro Day

=== Detroit Lions ===
Tomlinson was drafted in the first round with the 28th overall pick by the Detroit Lions in the 2015 NFL draft. He was the first Duke player to be selected in the first round of an NFL Draft since Mike Junkin in 1987.

=== San Francisco 49ers ===
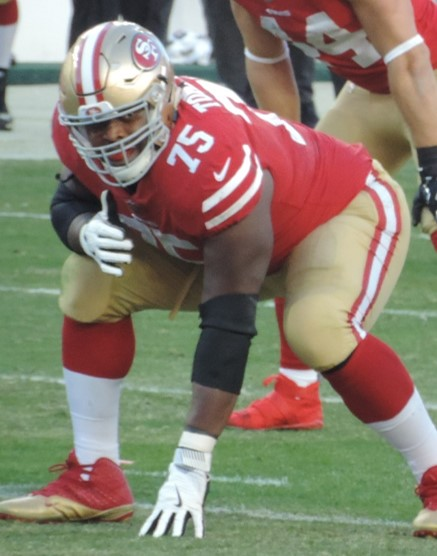
Tomlinson in a game against the Tennessee Titans

On August 31, 2017, Tomlinson was traded to the San Francisco 49ers for a 2019 5th round draft pick. After missing the season opener, Tomlinson started the next 15 games at left guard in 2017.

On May 2, 2018, the 49ers declined the fifth year option on Tomlinson's contract, making him a free agent in 2019. However on June 22, 2018, Tomlinson signed a three-year, $18 million extension with the 49ers with $10 million guaranteed.

=== New York Jets ===
On March 17, 2022, Tomlinson signed a three-year contract with the New York Jets. On February 26, 2024, Tomlinson was released by the Jets.

=== Seattle Seahawks ===
On April 15, 2024, Tomlinson signed with the Seattle Seahawks.

=== Houston Texans ===
On March 18, 2025, Tomlinson signed with the Houston Texans. He was named the Week 1 starting left guard, and started seven of 10 games played before being released on December 2.

=== Baltimore Ravens ===
On December 9, 2025, Tomlinson signed with the Baltimore Ravens' practice squad.

=== Dallas Cowboys ===
On September 9, 2026, Tomlinson was signed to the Dallas Cowboys' practice squad.

=== Green Bay Packers ===
On September 28, 2026, Tomlinson was signed by the Green Bay Packers off the Cowboys practice squad.
