= Jalen Ramsey =

American football player (born 1994)

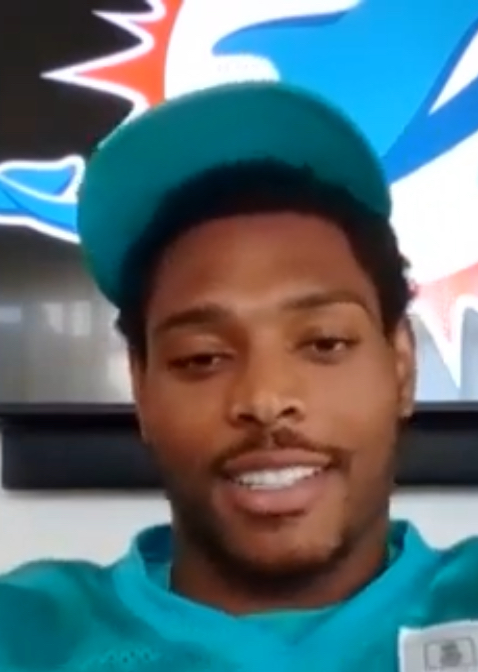
- Ramsey with the Miami Dolphins in 2023

No. 5 – Pittsburgh Steelers
- Position: Cornerback
- Roster status: Active

Personal information
- Born: October 24, 1994 (age 32); Smyrna, Tennessee, U.S.
- Listed height: 6 ft 1 in (1.85 m)
- Listed weight: 208 lb (94 kg)

Career information
- High school: Brentwood Academy (Brentwood, Tennessee)
- College: Florida State (2013–2015)
- NFL draft: 2016: 1st round, 5th overall pick

Career history
- Jacksonville Jaguars (2016–2019); Los Angeles Rams (2019–2022); Miami Dolphins (2023–2024); Pittsburgh Steelers (2025–present)

Awards and highlights
- Super Bowl champion (LVI); 3× First-team All-Pro (2017, 2020, 2021); 8× Pro Bowl (2017–2023, 2025); PFWA All-Rookie Team (2016); BCS national champion (2013); Consensus All-American (2015); Second-team All-American (2014); 2× First-team All-ACC (2014, 2015)

Career NFL statistics as of Week 10, 2026
- Total tackles: 674
- Sacks: 8.0
- Forced fumbles: 8
- Fumble recoveries: 2
- Pass deflections: 118
- Interceptions: 25
- Defensive touchdowns: 1
- Stats at Pro Football Reference

Jalen Ramsey (/ˈdʒeɪlən/ JAY-lən; born October 24, 1994) is an American professional football cornerback for the Pittsburgh Steelers of the National Football League (NFL). He played college football for the Florida State Seminoles and was selected by the Jacksonville Jaguars fifth overall in the 2016 NFL draft.

With the Jaguars, Ramsey quickly became one of the top cornerbacks in the NFL, making the Pro Bowl and being named an All-Pro in 2017, in addition to helping Jacksonville snap a 10-year playoff drought. However, following a fallout and standoff with the Jaguars' front office, he was traded to the Los Angeles Rams midway through the 2019 season. In 2020, he agreed to an extension with the Rams that made him the highest paid cornerback in league history at the time. Ramsey won Super Bowl LVI with the Rams before being traded to the Miami Dolphins during the 2023 offseason. He was traded to the Steelers prior to the 2025 season.

== Early life ==
Ramsey was born on October 24, 1994, in Smyrna, Tennessee, to Lamont and Margie Ramsey. Lamont was a District Chief in the Fire Department and later became Jalen's training coach. Jalen's older brother, Jamal, participated in football, basketball, and track at Battle Ground Academy in Franklin, Tennessee, and played quarterback at Middle Tennessee State University in Murfreesboro, Tennessee, where their father had once played football. Jalen improved his football skills playing with much older boys at a local park. He grew up cheering for the Miami Hurricanes in a family of Florida Gators fans.

Ramsey attended Ensworth High School in Nashville, Tennessee, as a freshman. He then transferred to Brentwood Academy in Brentwood, Tennessee, where he was a two-sport star in football and track & field. Ramsey was rated by both Rivals.com and Scout.com as a five-star recruit and one of the top overall recruits in his class. Ramsey originally committed to the University of Southern California (USC) to play college football, but later changed to Florida State University.

Ramsey had a highly decorated high school track career. On May 24, 2013, in his final high school track meet, Ramsey shattered the Tennessee state record in the long jump with a mark of 25 feet 3.25 inches (7.7026 m), breaking the 16-year-old record set in 1997. As of 2016, no other athlete in TSSAA history has surpassed the 25-foot mark. Ramsey competed in events ranging from the 100 meters to the shot put. As a sprinter, he recorded personal best times of 10.50 in the 100-meter dash, 21.44 in the 200-meter dash, and 48.02 in the 400-meter dash. Ramsey established personal bests in the high jump at 6 feet 8 inches (2.03 m) and the triple jump 47 feet 7 inches (14.50 m). He also posted a top throw of 49 feet 11 inches (15.21 m) in the shot put.

== College career ==
=== Football ===
Ramsey started all 14 games for the Florida State Seminoles as a true freshman in 2013. He was the first true freshman to start a game at cornerback for the team since Deion Sanders in 1985. Ramsey wore jersey #13 during his freshman year when Florida State won the National Championship over Auburn. He later switched to jersey #8 for his sophomore and junior seasons. Ramsey also chose the #17 jersey for kick returns during his junior year, a number that had been retired in honor of former superstar Charlie Ward, who granted Ramsey permission to wear it. He recorded a 23-yard fumble return for a touchdown in the 59–3 victory over Wake Forest on November 9, 2013. Ramsey finished the year with 49 tackles, an interception, and a sack.

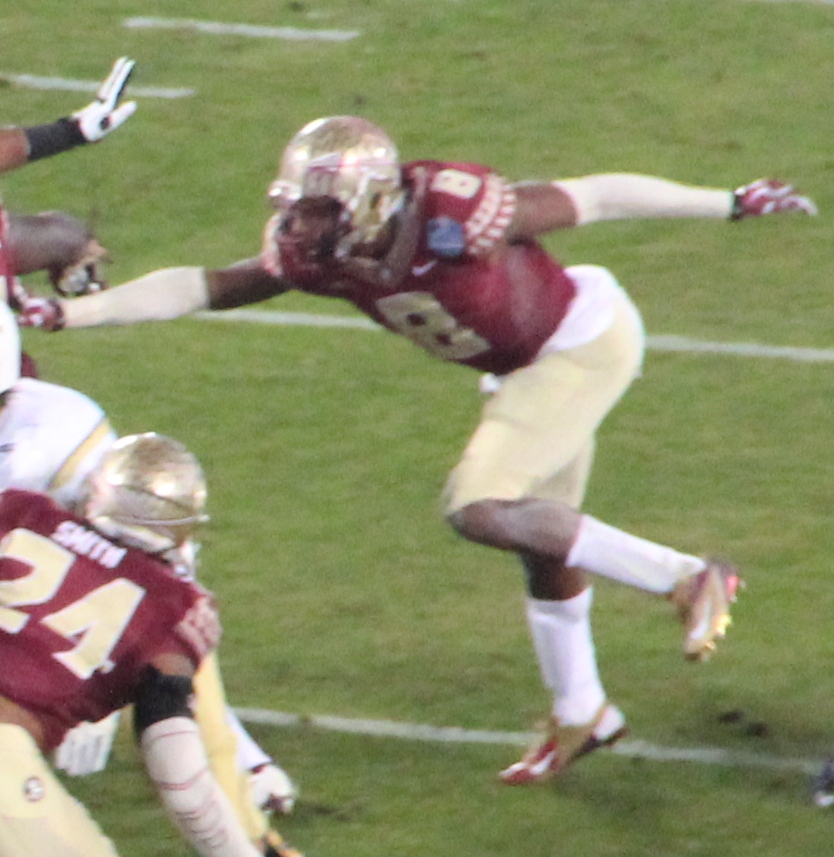
Ramsey in 2014

As a sophomore, Ramsey played 14 games with 80 tackles, two interceptions, 12 passes defended, three forced fumbles, and two sacks.

As a junior, Ramsey played 13 games with one sack, nine passes defended, and one fumble recovery on 52 tackles. On September 18, against Boston College, he recorded a 36-yard fumble return for a touchdown in the 14–0 victory. Ramsey was named as a Consensus All-American for his performance in the 2015 season. After his junior year, Ramsey announced his intention to forgo his senior season and enter the 2016 NFL draft.

=== Track and field ===
Ramsey competed in track & field at Florida State as a relay sprinter and long jumper. He was a three-time All-Atlantic Coast Conference (ACC) honoree as a member of the Florida State Indoor and Outdoor championship track and field team in 2013. He placed third in the long jump at both the indoor and outdoor ACC T&F Championships and ran a leg on the conference champion 4×100 relay team at the outdoor meet.

During the 2014 season, Ramsey's best outdoor long jump mark was 25 ft 0 in (7.62 m) and his top indoor jump was 24 ft 11 in (7.59 m), ranking second nationally among NCAA Division I football players. Ramsey qualified for the NCAA East Preliminary meet in the long jump. He placed third at the 2014 ACC Indoor Championship in the long jump 7.46 metres (24 ft 6 in).

In March 2015, Ramsey recorded his personal best jump of 26 ft 1.75 in (7.9693 m) at the NCAA Indoor Championships. In May 2015, Ramsey won the ACC Long Jump Championship with a leap of 26 ft 1.5 in (7.963 m),

== Professional career ==
=== Pre-draft ===
Coming out of Florida State, Ramsey was projected a first round pick by NFL draft experts and scouts. He was considered to be a top 10 pick by NFL media analysts Daniel Jeremiah, Charles Davis, and Mike Mayock. Ramsey received an invitation to the NFL Combine and completed all the combine and positional drills and tied for the top performance in the broad jump and vertical jump.

External videos
- Jalen Ramsey's NFL Combine Workout
- Jalen Ramsey's 40-yard dash

On March 29, 2016, Ramsey chose to participate at Florida State's pro day, along with Roberto Aguayo, Lamarcus Brutus, Terrance Smith, and 20 other prospects. Team representatives and scouts from 31 NFL teams attended, with the Cincinnati Bengals opting not to, and among them included general managers Doug Whaley (Buffalo Bills), Kevin Colbert (Pittsburgh Steelers), Jason Licht (Tampa Bay Buccaneers), Jon Robinson (Tennessee Titans), and Steelers' head coach Mike Tomlin. Ramsey chose to stand on his combine numbers and only perform positional drills. Ramsey was ranked as the top free safety prospect in the draft by NFLDraftScout.com, the top overall defensive back prospect by Sports Illustrated, and the top cornerback by NFL analyst Mike Mayock.

Pre-draft measurables
Height	Weight	Arm length	Hand span	Wingspan	40-yard dash	10-yard split	20-yard split	20-yard shuttle	Three-cone drill	Vertical jump	Broad jump	Bench press	Wonderlic
6 ft 1 1/4 in (1.86 m)	209 lb (95 kg)	33 3/8 in (0.85 m)	9 1/2 in (0.24 m)	6 ft 7 5/8 in (2.02 m)	4.41 s	1.52 s	2.57 s	4.18 s	6.94 s	41.5 in (1.05 m)	11 ft 3 in (3.43 m)	14 reps	24
All values from NFL Combine

=== Jacksonville Jaguars ===
The Jacksonville Jaguars selected Ramsey in the first round (fifth overall) of the 2016 NFL draft. He was the first cornerback selected. He surpassed 1999 first round pick Fernando Bryant (26th overall) to become the highest drafted cornerback in franchise history.

External videos
- Jaguars draft Jalen Ramsey 5th overall

==== 2016 season ====
On May 19, 2016, Ramsey suffered a small meniscus tear during rookie training camp. He had microfracture surgery on the same knee in his sophomore year of high school. Three days later, the Jaguars signed Ramsey to a four-year, $23.35 million rookie contract that included $22.9 million guaranteed and an initial signing bonus of $15.18 million.

On May 24, Ramsey underwent surgery to repair the torn meniscus. Throughout training camp, he competed against Davon House, Prince Amukamara, Aaron Colvin, Dwayne Gratz, and Josh Johnson to be the starting cornerback. Head coach Gus Bradley named Ramsey the starting cornerback and paired him with Davon House to start the season.

On September 11, 2016, Ramsey made his professional regular season debut and first career start in the game against the Green Bay Packers and recorded three combined tackles (two solo) during a 27–23 loss. During Week 8, he tallied eight combined tackles (four solo) in the 36–22 road loss to the Tennessee Titans. On December 18, 2016, Ramsey made four solo tackles, five pass deflections, forced a fumble, and had his first career interception off a pass thrown by Brock Osweiler to wide receiver Will Fuller during a narrow 21–20 road loss to the Houston Texans. Following the game, the Jaguars fired head coach Gus Bradley after falling to a 2–12 record. Offensive line coach Doug Marrone was appointed interim head coach for the remainder of the season. On December 24, 2016, Ramsey made four solo tackles, four pass deflections, and returned an interception thrown by Matt Cassel to wide receiver Rishard Matthews 30–yards for his first career touchdown during a 38–17 victory over the Titans. Ramsey was named American Football Conference (AFC) Defensive Player of the Week for his performance against the Titans.

Ramsey finished his rookie season with 65 combined tackles (55 solo), 14 pass deflections, two interceptions, and a touchdown in 16 games and starts. Pro Football Focus (PFF) gave Ramsey an overall grade of 82.3, which ranked 21st among all qualifying cornerbacks in 2016. He was named to the NFL All-Rookie Team.

==== 2017 season ====
Ramsey entered training camp as the de facto No. 1 starting cornerback. Head coach Doug Marrone named Ramsey the No. 1 starting cornerback and paired him with A. J. Bouye, as they both led a revamped secondary that included Aaron Colvin, Barry Church, and Tashaun Gipson. NFL analyst Ike Taylor ranked them the seventh best secondary prior to the season.

On September 24, 2017, Ramsey recorded two solo tackles, deflected a pass, and intercepted a pass by Joe Flacco as the Jaguars routed the Baltimore Ravens 44–7. On October 8, 2017, Ramsey collected a season-high seven solo tackles, a season-high four pass deflections, and intercepted a pass by Ben Roethlisberger to tight end Vance McDonald during a 30–9 victory at the Pittsburgh Steelers. On November 5, 2017, Ramsey was ejected during a 23–7 victory over the Cincinnati Bengals after an altercation that began with him pushing Cincinnati Bengals wide receiver A. J. Green to the ground and ended with several punches thrown. On December 19, 2017, he was named to his first Pro Bowl as a starter alongside teammate Bouye. He started all 16 games in 2017 and made 63 combined tackles (52 solo), 17 pass deflections, and four interceptions. PFF gave Ramsey an overall grade of 91.8, which ranked second among all qualifying cornerbacks in 2017. He was named as a First Team All-Pro.

The Jacksonville Jaguars finished the 2017 NFL season atop the AFC South with a 10–6 record. On January 7, 2018, Ramsey started in his first career postseason game and recorded two solo tackles, one pass deflection, and intercepted a pass by Nathan Peterman to Deonte Thompson during a 10–3 victory against the Buffalo Bills in the Wild Card Round. In the Divisional Round at the Pittsburgh Steelers, he finished with four combined tackles (three solo) in the 45–42 road victory at Heinz Field. On January 21, 2018, he recorded two solo tackles in the AFC Championship at the New England Patriots during a 24–20 loss. He was ranked 17th by his fellow players on the NFL Top 100 Players of 2018.

==== 2018 season ====
Defensive coordinator Todd Washington retained Ramsey and A. J. Bouye as the starting cornerbacks to begin the regular season.

On November 18, 2018, Ramsey collected a season-high eight solo tackles, a season-high three pass deflections, and a season-high two interceptions off passes thrown by Ben Roethlisberger during a 20–16 loss to the Pittsburgh Steelers.

Ramsey started all 16 games and had a total of 65 combined tackles (62 solo), 13 pass deflections, and three interceptions as the Jaguars finished with a 5–11 record. He was named to his second Pro Bowl. He was ranked 27th by his fellow players on the NFL Top 100 Players of 2019.

==== 2019 season ====
On April 25, 2019, the Jaguars exercised the fifth–year option on Ramsey's rookie contract that was guaranteed for one-year, $13.73 million. Head coach Doug Marrone selected Ramsey to be the No. 1 starting cornerback for the third consecutive season and paired him with A. J. Bouye.

On September 15, 2019, Ramsey recorded four solo and a pass deflection, but was involved in a verbal altercation with Jaguars head coach Doug Marrone, and the player and coach had to be physically restrained from each other as the Jaguars lost 13–12 at the Houston Texans. The following day, reports surfaced that Ramsey was demanding a trade, but he started the following week in a 20–7 victory over the Titans, the Jaguars' first victory of the season. The following week, Ramsey was placed on the inactive list, with the team announcing that Ramsey would be absent in order to attend the birth of his second child. He remained listed as inactive for the next three games (Weeks 3–6) and never appeared as a member of the Jacksonville Jaguars again.

=== Los Angeles Rams ===
On October 15, 2019, the Jaguars traded Ramsey to the Los Angeles Rams in exchange for a 2020 first round pick (20th overall) a 2021 first rounder (25th overall), and a 4th rounder (130th overall). The Jaguars went on to use the 2020 first round pick on K'Lavon Chaisson, the 2021 first round pick on Travis Etienne, and went on to trade the 2021 fourth round pick back to the Rams.

The previous day, the Los Angeles Rams had placed starting cornerback Aqib Talib on injured reserve due to a rib injury. Following the trade, the Rams subsequently traded away former starting cornerback Marcus Peters. Head coach Sean McVay named Ramsey the No. 1 starting cornerback to replace Marcus Peters and paired him with Troy Hill.

On December 21, 2019, Ramsey recorded four solo tackles, two pass deflections, and had his first interception as a member of the Rams on a pass thrown by Jimmy Garoppolo to wide receiver Emmanuel Sanders during a 34–31 loss at the San Francisco 49ers on Saturday Night Football. In the final minute on third and 16, he and safety Taylor Rapp made an error in coverage, resulting in a 46–yard reception to Emmanuel Sanders, which led to the game-winning field goal which lost the game and subsequently ended the Rams chances for playoff contention. He finished with 50 combined tackles (44 solo), five passes defensed, two forced fumbles, and one interception. He earned a third consecutive Pro Bowl nomination. He was ranked 37th by his fellow players on the NFL Top 100 Players of 2020.

==== 2020 season ====
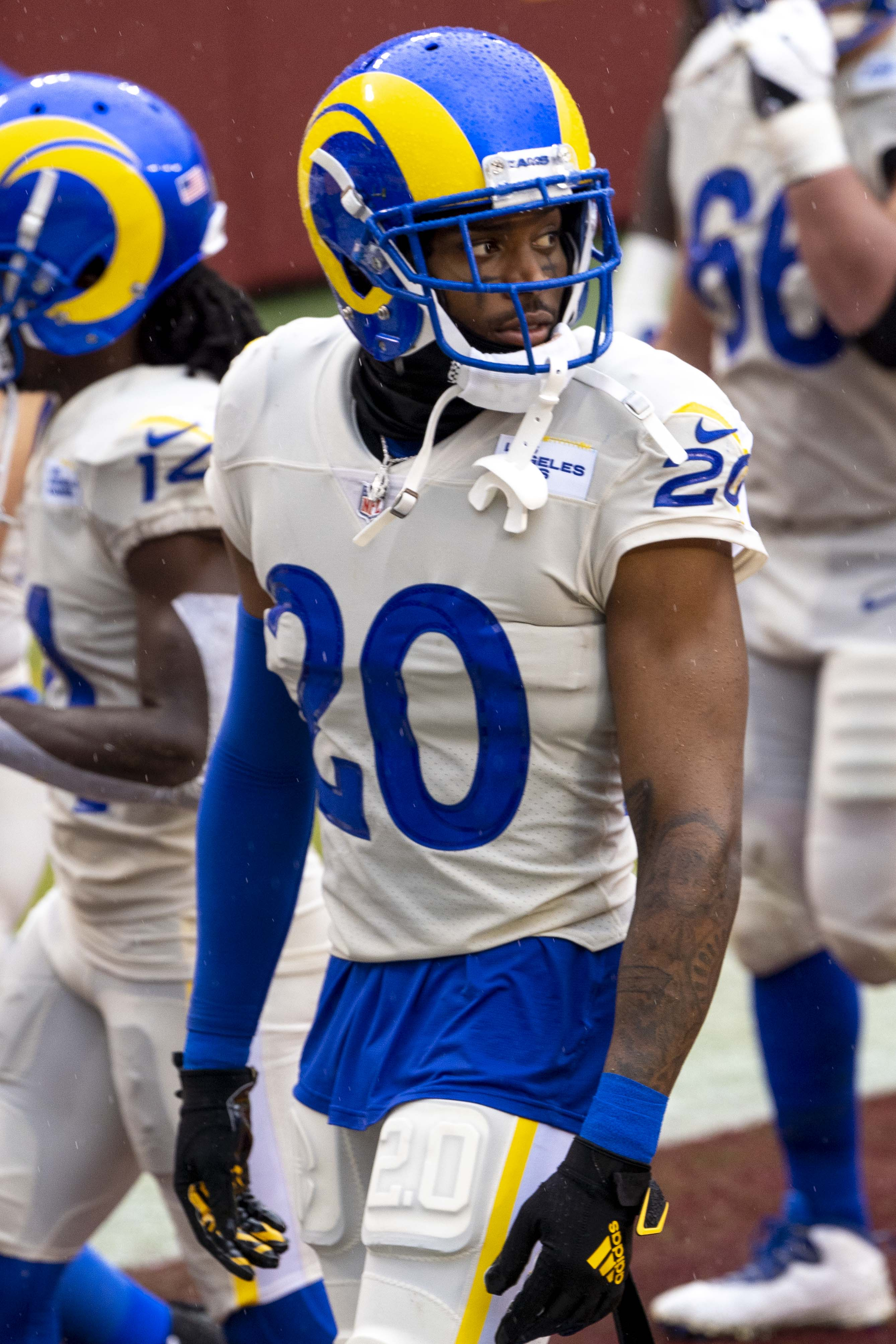
Ramsey in 2020

On January 16, 2020, the Los Angeles Rams hired Denver Broncos' linebackers coach Brandon Staley as their new defensive coordinator after they elected not to re-sign Wade Phillips. Staley retained Ramsey and Troy Hill as the starting cornerbacks as they began the regular season.

On September 9, 2020, the Los Angeles Rams signed Ramsey to a five–year, $100 million contract extension that includes $71.2 million guaranteed, $43.7 million guaranteed upon signing, and an initial signing bonus of $25 million. The deal made him the highest-paid defensive back in NFL history.

On September 13, 2020, Ramsey started in the Los Angeles Rams' home-opener against the Dallas Cowboys and set a season-high with six solo tackles and made one pass deflection during their 20–17 victory. On October 4, 2020, Ramsey recorded five combined tackles (four solo) as the Rams defeated the New York Giants 17–9. Following the game, it was reported Ramsey was involved in a physical altercation with his ex-girlfriend's brother, Giants' wide receiver Golden Tate, due in part to Ramsey's comments against Tate's sister Breanna who he had two children with. On October 10, 2020, Ramsey was fined $15,625 for his role in the postgame fight. On October 26, 2020, he had four solo tackles, one pass deflection, and made his only interception of the season on a pass by Nick Foles intended for tight end Jimmy Graham during a 24–10 win against the Chicago Bears. The following week, he was inactive during the Rams' 28-17 loss at the Miami Dolphins due to an illness not related to COVID-19.

Ramsey finished the 2020 season with 44 combined tackles (36 solo), one interception, and nine passes defensed in 15 games. He earned First Team All-Pro honors and his second Pro Bowl nomination for 2020. He was ranked 13th by his fellow players on the NFL Top 100 Players of 2021.

==== 2021 season ====
On June 13, 2021, Ramsey announced during the Rams minicamp that he would change his number to No. 5 per the new NFL jersey number rule. Ramsey entered training camp slated as the de facto No. 1 starting cornerback. Head coach Sean McVay named Ramsey the starting cornerback to begin the regular season and paired him with Darious Williams.

On September 12, 2021, Ramsey started in the Los Angeles Rams' home-opener against the Chicago Bears and racked up a season-high nine combined tackles (seven solo) and broke up a pass during a 34–14 victory. In Week 2, he made three combined tackles (one solo), a pass deflection, and intercepted a pass thrown by Jacob Eason to tight end Jack Doyle late in the fourth quarter to secure a 27–24 win at the Indianapolis Colts. On December 13, 2021, the Rams placed him on COVID-19/reserve list and he subsequently missed their Week 14 win at the Arizona Cardinals on Monday Night Football. In Week 18, Ramsey recorded three solo tackles, made one pass deflection, and intercepted a pass by Jimmy Garoppolo to tight end George Kittle in the endzone during a 27–24 loss at the San Francisco 49ers. He finished the 2021 regular season with 77 combined tackles (62 solo), 16 pass deflections, tied a career-high with four interceptions, had a forced fumble, and one fumble recovery in 16 games and 16 starts. He finished the season with an overall grade of 84.4 from Pro Football Focus, marking the third highest grade of his career.

The Rams finished the season atop the NFC West with a 12–5 record and clinched a playoff berth. On January 17, 2022, the Rams defeated the Cardinals in the Wild Card Round 34–11. The following week, Ramsey made four combined tackles (three solo) and one pass deflection during a 30–27 win at the Tampa Bay Buccaneers in the Divisional Round. On January 30, 2022, he had one solo tackle and two pass deflections as the Rams defeated the San Francisco 49ers 20–17 in the NFC Championship Game to advance to the Super Bowl. On February 13, 2022, Ramsey started in Super Bowl LVI and recorded four combined tackles (three solo) and had one pass deflection as the Rams defeated the Cincinnati Bengals in a 23–20 comeback, earning Ramsey his first career Super Bowl ring. He earned First Team All-Pro honors and a Pro Bowl nomination for 2021. He was ranked ninth by his fellow players on the NFL Top 100 Players of 2022.

==== 2022 season ====
On June 21, 2022, it was reported that Ramsey had undergone shoulder surgery. It was revealed that Ramsey had tears in both shoulders during the entire 2021 NFL season. Morris retained Ramsey and Troy Hill as the starting cornerbacks to start the season.

In Week 3, he racked up a season-high eight solo tackles and made two pass deflections during a 20–12 win at the Arizona Cardinals. In Week 9, Ramsey collected a season-high nine combined tackles (six solo) and broke up two passes as the Rams lost 16–13 at the Tampa Bay Buccaneers. On December 25, 2022, he made five combined tackles (four solo), a season-high three pass deflections, and intercepted a pass in the endzone thrown by Russell Wilson to tight end Greg Dulcich as the Rams routed the Denver Broncos 51–14. Two weeks later, Ramsey made five solo tackles, tied his season-high of three pass deflections, and set a season-high with two interceptions off pass attempts thrown by Geno Smith during a 19-16 overtime loss at the Seattle Seahawks.

Ramsey started in all 17 games during the 2022 NFL season and had a career-high 88 combined tackles (64 solo), 18 passes defended, four interceptions, two sacks, and two forced fumbles. He earned his sixth Pro Bowl nomination and was ranked 36th by his fellow players on the NFL Top 100 Players of 2023. Ramsey received an overall grade of 86.4 from Pro Football Focus, which ranked third among all cornerbacks, only finishing behind Sauce Gardner and Patrick Surtain II.

=== Miami Dolphins ===
==== 2023 season ====
On March 15, 2023, the Miami Dolphins traded tight end Hunter Long and a 2023 third-round pick (77th overall) to the Los Angeles Rams and in return received Ramsey. During training camp, he suffered a torn meniscus and was ruled out for multiple months. On August 31, the Dolphins placed him on injured reserve.

On October 28, 2023, the Dolphins officially activated Ramsey from injured reserve and added him to their active roster. Head coach Mike McDaniel immediately inserted him into the role as the No. 1 starting cornerback, supplanting Eli Apple, and paired him with Kader Kohou. The next day, Ramsey made his Dolphins debut and recorded one solo tackle, a pass deflection, and intercepted a pass by Mac Jones to wide receiver Kendrick Bourne during a 31–17 victory over the New England Patriots. In Week 11, Ramsey had one tackle, two pass deflections, and set a season-high with two interceptions off passes thrown by Aidan O'Connell as the Dolphins defeated the Las Vegas Raiders 20–13 victory. He was named AFC Defensive Player of the Week for Week 11 and would also receive Pro Bowl honors for the seventh consecutive season. In Week 16, he collected a season-high four solo tackles during a 22–20 victory against the Dallas Cowboys.

Ramsey started in ten games during the 2023 NFL season and recorded 22 combined tackles (18 solo), five pass deflections, and three interceptions. He was ranked 25th by his fellow players on the NFL Top 100 Players of 2024.

==== 2024 season ====
The Dolphins hired Anthony Weaver as their new defensive coordinator after mutually parting ways with Vic Fangio. Head coach Mike McDaniel retained Ramsey as the No. 1 starting cornerback and he started alongside Kendall Fuller. On September 6, 2024, the Miami Dolphins signed Ramsey to a three–year, $72.3 million contract extension that includes $24.23 million guaranteed upon signing, making him the highest paid cornerback in the NFL.

In Week 10, he racked up six combined tackles (four solo) as the Dolphins defeated his former team in a 23–15 victory at the Los Angeles Rams. The following week, Ramsey had five solo tackles, had two pass deflections, and intercepted a pass by Gardner Minshew to wide receiver Jakobi Meyers during a 34-19 win over the Las Vegas Raiders on Week 11. He started all 17 games and finished the season with 60 combined tackles (39 solo), 11 passes defended, two interceptions, and one sack. He was ranked 66th by his fellow players on the NFL Top 100 Players of 2025. After mutually agreeing to part ways, Dolphins general manager, Chris Grier, announced that the team and Ramsey would be seeking potential trade partners on April 15, 2025.

=== Pittsburgh Steelers ===
Ramsey with the Steelers in 2026

==== 2025 season ====
On June 30, 2025, Ramsey, along with Jonnu Smith and a 2027 seventh-round pick, was traded to the Pittsburgh Steelers in exchange for Minkah Fitzpatrick and a 2027 fifth-round pick. The trade to Pittsburgh included a $1.5 million raise, bringing Ramsey's expected earnings to $26.6 million in 2025.

During the season opener against the New York Jets, Ramsey had two tackles and a game-sealing hit on wide receiver Garrett Wilson with 18 seconds left to give the Steelers a narrow 34–32 victory. In Week 6, Ramsey recorded his first career multi-sack game, putting up two sacks during a 23–9 victory over the Cleveland Browns. In Week 11, Ramsey punched Cincinnati Bengals wide receiver Ja'Marr Chase after being spit on, and was ejected from the game. Chase was suspended for one game the next day. Ramsey was later fined $14,491 for punching Chase. Chase later apologized after the incident. In the 2025 season, Ramsey finished with three sacks, 88 tackles (53 solo), one interception, and eight passes defended. He was ranked 82nd by his fellow players on the NFL Top 100 Players of 2026.

==== 2026 season ====
In Week 6 of the 2026 NFL season against the Tampa Bay Buccaneers, Ramsey posted 10 tackles, two sacks and four tackles for loss including a fourth-down sack on the final play of the game, sealing the win for the Steelers and earned AFC Defensive Player of the Week for his performance.

== Career statistics ==
Legend
	Won the Super Bowl
	Led the league
**Bold**	Career high

=== NFL ===
==== Regular season ====
Year	Team	Games		Tackles					Interceptions						Fumbles			
Year	Team	GP	GS	Cmb	Solo	Ast	Sck	TFL	PD	Int	Yds	Avg	Lng	TD	FF	FR	Yds	TD
2016	JAX	16	16	65	55	10	0.0	2	14	2	**65**	**32.5**	35T	**1**	1	0	0	0
2017	JAX	16	16	63	52	11	0.0	2	17	**4**	34	8.5	18	0	0	0	0	0
2018	JAX	16	16	65	62	3	0.0	2	13	3	0	0.0	0	0	0	0	0	0
2019	JAX	3	3	17	13	4	0.0	0	1	0	0	0.0	0	0	1	0	0	0
2019	LAR	9	8	33	31	2	0.0	0	4	1	13	13.0	13	0	1	0	0	0
2020	LAR	15	15	44	36	8	0.0	2	9	1	2	2.0	2	0	0	0	0	0
2021	LAR	16	16	77	62	15	0.0	**9**	16	**4**	41	10.3	25	0	1	**1**	8	0
2022	LAR	17	17	**88**	**64**	24	2.0	4	**18**	**4**	53	13.3	28	0	**2**	**1**	**12**	0
2023	MIA	10	10	22	18	4	0.0	0	5	3	52	17.3	**49**	0	0	0	0	0
2024	MIA	17	17	60	39	21	1.0	6	11	2	7	3.5	7	0	0	0	0	0
2025	PIT	17	17	**88**	53	**35**	**3.0**	4	8	1	2	2.0	2	0	0	0	0	0
2026	PIT	9	9	52	30	22	2.0	5	2	0	0	0.0	0	0	2	0	0	0
Career		161	160	674	515	159	8.0	36	118	25	269	10.8	49	1	8	2	20	0

==== Postseason ====
Year	Team	Games		Tackles					Interceptions						Fumbles			
Year	Team	GP	GS	Cmb	Solo	Ast	Sck	TFL	PD	Int	Yds	Avg	Lng	TD	FF	FR	Yds	TD
2017	JAX	3	3	8	7	1	0.0	0	1	**1**	**2**	**2.0**	**2**	0	0	0	0	0
2020	LAR	2	2	7	4	**3**	0.0	0	1	0	0	0.0	0	0	0	0	0	0
2021	LAR	4	4	**13**	**11**	2	0.0	0	**4**	0	0	0.0	0	0	0	0	0	0
2023	MIA	1	1	5	4	1	0.0	**1**	1	0	0	0.0	0	0	0	0	0	0
2025	PIT	1	1	4	3	1	0.0	0	0	0	0	0.0	0	0	0	0	0	0
Career		11	11	37	29	8	0.0	1	7	1	2	2.0	2	0	0	0	0	0

=== College ===
Season	Team	GP	Tackles			Int & Fum		
Season	Team	GP	Cmb	TfL	Sck	PD	Int	FF
2013	Florida State	14	49	2.0	1.0	1	1	1
2014	Florida State	14	**80**	**10.0**	**3.0**	**12**	**2**	**3**
2015	Florida State	13	52	3.5	1.0	9	0	0
Total		41	181	15.5	5.0	22	3	4

== Personal life ==
Ramsey is a Christian. He frequently mentions his faith on his social media accounts.

In July 2018, Ramsey and Breanna Tate, the younger sister of retired wide receiver Golden Tate, had a daughter together. The pair had a second daughter in September 2019, though they had broken up earlier that summer.

Ramsey was known for his trash talk both on and off the field, primarily during his time with Jacksonville. Notable examples include Ramsey's altercation with Cincinnati Bengals wide receiver A. J. Green in 2017, which was caused by his trash talk, and banter between him and Kansas City Chiefs wide receiver Tyreek Hill prior to a 2018 matchup between the Jaguars and Chiefs. In an August 2018 interview with GQ, Ramsey also offered his unfiltered opinions of several NFL quarterbacks, criticizing Joe Flacco, Josh Allen, Andrew Luck, Eli Manning, Ben Roethlisberger, Matt Ryan, and Jared Goff, among others. During a game against the rival Seattle Seahawks in 2019, Ramsey engaged in an altercation with Seahawks’ then-rookie receiver DK Metcalf. Ramsey was not charged for the penalty nor fined by the league after the incident, but Metcalf was given a penalty.

== Filmography ==
Film roles
Year	Title	Role
2022	Jackass Forever	Himself
