= Shaq Mason =

American football player (born 1993)

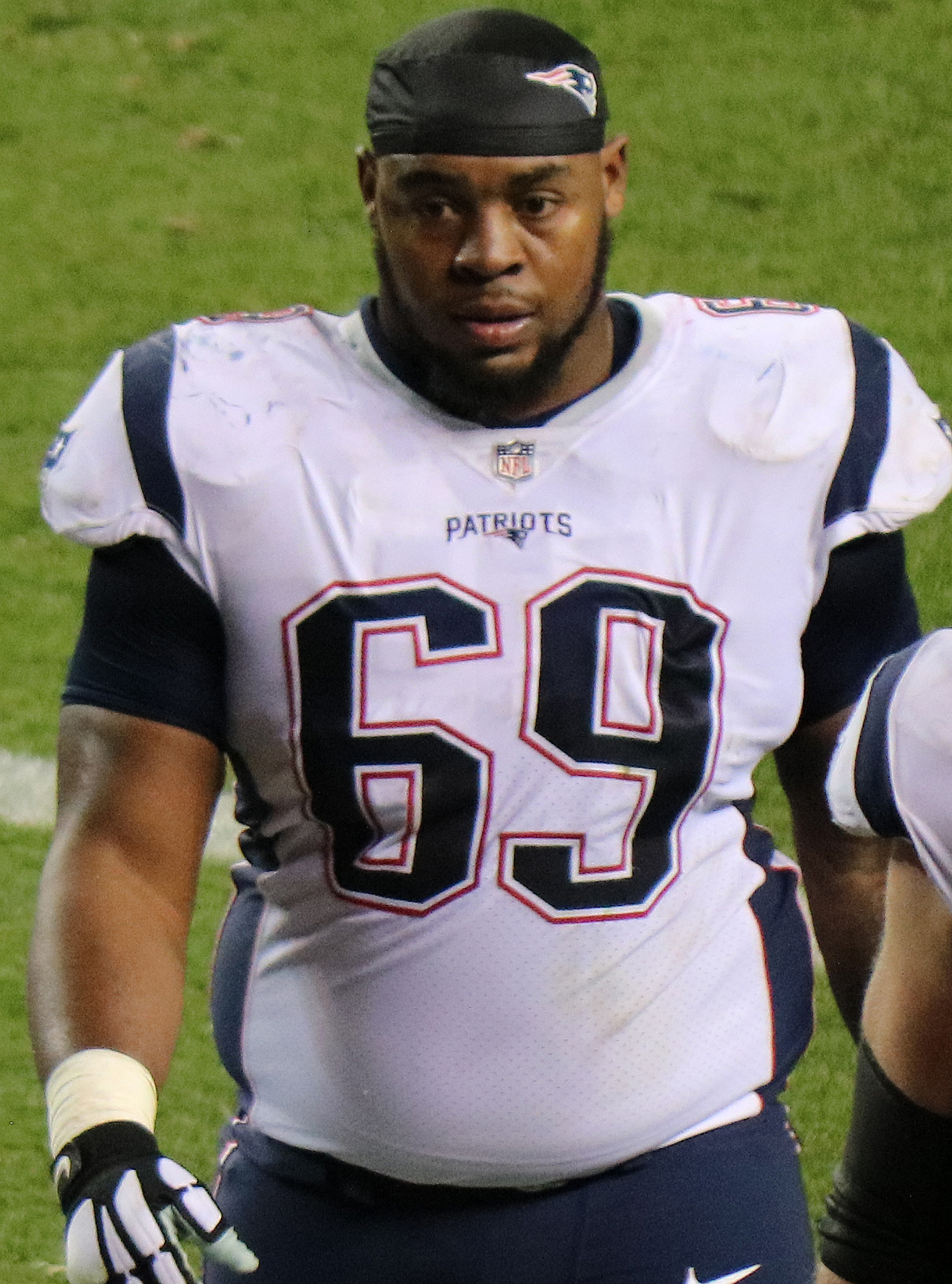
- Mason with the New England Patriots in 2017

Profile
- Position: Guard

Personal information
- Born: August 28, 1993 (age 33); Columbia, Tennessee, U.S.
- Listed height: 6 ft 1 in (1.85 m)
- Listed weight: 310 lb (141 kg)

Career information
- High school: Columbia Central
- College: Georgia Tech (2011–2014)
- NFL draft: 2015: 4th round, 131st overall pick

Career history
- New England Patriots (2015–2021); Tampa Bay Buccaneers (2022); Houston Texans (2023–2024)

Awards and highlights
- 2× Super Bowl champion (LI, LIII); First-team All-ACC (2013); Second-team All-ACC (2014)

Career NFL statistics as of 2024
- Games played: 152
- Games started: 147
- Stats at Pro Football Reference

Shaquille Olajuwon Mason (born August 28, 1993) is an American professional football offensive guard. Mason played college football for the Georgia Tech Yellow Jackets from 2011 to 2014 and was selected by the New England Patriots in the fourth round of the 2015 NFL draft.

== College career ==
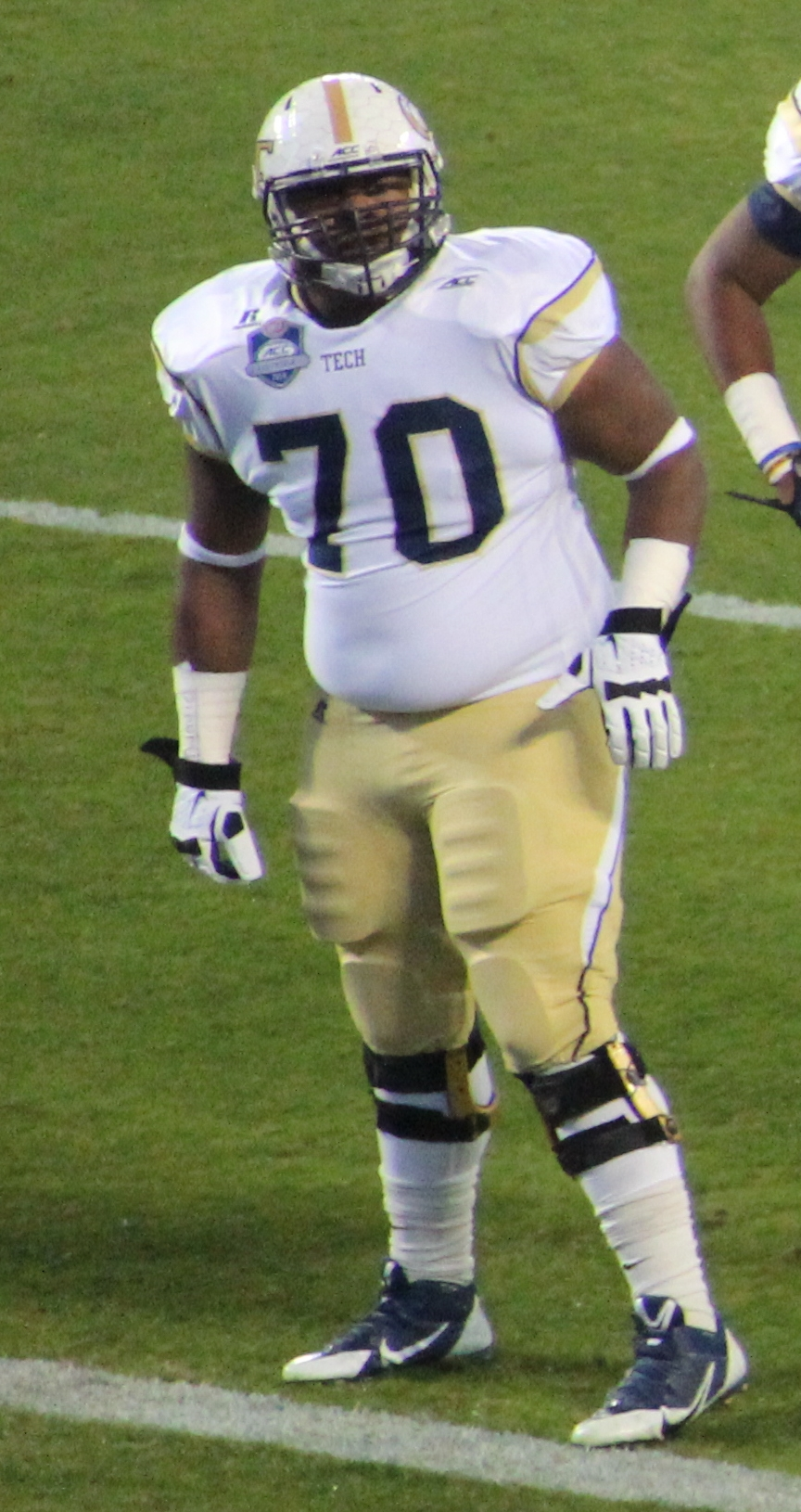
Mason with Georgia Tech in 2014

Mason played 11 games as a true freshman in 2011. From 2012 to 2014, he started in 39 of the Yellow Jackets' 41 games, including every game as a junior and senior. Mason was first-team All-Atlantic Coast Conference in 2013 and 2014 as well as first-team All-American in 2014.

== Professional career ==
Pre-draft measurables
Height	Weight	Arm length	Hand span	40-yard dash	10-yard split	20-yard split	20-yard shuttle	Three-cone drill	Vertical jump	Broad jump	Bench press
6 ft 1 3/4 in (1.87 m)	304 lb (138 kg)	32 1/8 in (0.82 m)	9 1/2 in (0.24 m)	4.99 s	1.75 s	2.82 s	4.65 s	7.53 s	32.0 in (0.81 m)	9 ft 2 in (2.79 m)	25 reps
All values from Pro Day

=== New England Patriots ===
On May 2, 2015, Mason was selected in the fourth round (131st overall) by the New England Patriots. Mason appeared in 14 games with 10 starts for the Patriots as a rookie.

Mason broke his hand during the 2016 preseason and did not start in the season opener against the Arizona Cardinals but split time at right guard with rookie Ted Karras. Since then, he started every game at right guard for the Patriots.

On February 5, 2017, Mason was part of the Patriots team that won Super Bowl LI. In the game, the Patriots defeated the Atlanta Falcons by a score of 34–28 in overtime.

In 2017, Mason started all 16 games at right guard for the Patriots. He started in Super Bowl LII, but gave up the strip sack that ultimately proved to be the biggest play of the game. The Patriots lost 41–33 to the Philadelphia Eagles.

On August 27, 2018, Mason signed a five-year, $50 million contract extension with the Patriots. He started 14 games at right guard in 2018, missing two with a calf injury. He was given a grade of 82.1 by Pro Football Focus in the regular season, the highest grade of any guard in the league. Mason played every offensive snap in Super Bowl LIII and the Patriots defeated the Los Angeles Rams 13–3.

Mason was placed on the reserve/COVID-19 list by the Patriots on October 17, 2020, and activated on October 21.

=== Tampa Bay Buccaneers ===
On March 15, 2022, Mason was traded to the Tampa Bay Buccaneers in exchange for a fifth round pick in the 2022 NFL draft. The trade reunited him with star quarterback Tom Brady.

=== Houston Texans ===
On March 20, 2023, the Buccaneers traded Mason and a 2023 seventh-round pick to the Houston Texans in exchange for a sixth-round pick in the 2023 NFL draft. He signed a three-year, $36 million contract extension on May 10.

In 2024, Mason started 15 games and was tied with Alex Cappa for the league-lead in sacks allowed by a guard (8).

On March 7, 2025, it was announced the Texans will release Mason.
