= Luther Maddy =

Haitian gridiron football player (born 1993)

No. 92 – BC Lions
- Position: Defensive lineman
- Roster status: Active

Personal information
- Born: January 18, 1993 (age 33); Haiti
- Listed height: 6 ft 2 in (1.88 m)
- Listed weight: 285 lb (129 kg)

Career information
- High school: Atlantic (Delray Beach, Florida, U.S.)
- College: Virginia Tech
- NFL draft: 2016: undrafted

Career history
- BC Lions (2017–present)

Awards and highlights
- George Pass Award (2011); Iron Hokie (2012); Coaches Award (2012); President's Award (2013); Third-team All-ACC (2013)
- Stats at Pro Football Reference

Luther Maddy (born January 18, 1993) is a Haitian-born defensive tackle for the BC Lions of the Canadian Football League (CFL). He attended Atlantic High School in Delray Beach, Florida. He played college football at Virginia Tech and was drafted by the Lions in 2016.

== Early life ==
Maddy was born in Haiti on January 18, 1993, to parents Jumelle and Muraline Maddy. He emigrated from Haiti to Delray Beach, Florida with his mother at the age of 3 months. According to a Washington Post interview, he began pursuing football in the hope of earning scholarships to pay for college and support his family. He began playing football during his senior year. During that year, he played for head coach Chris Bean at Atlantic High School and recorded 13 sacks and 78 tackles, was rated as the No. 130 defensive tackle in the country and No. 32 player in the area, and named a Class 6A-5A-3A football second-team All-Palm Beach County selection. His performance attracting the attention of Bean, who shared footage of him with Virginia Tech coaches Wiles and Beamer. He was a late recruit to the Virginia Tech Hokies, accepting a scholarship offer to Virginia Tech the night before National Signing Day. He enrolled at Virginia Tech on July 6, 2011.

== College career ==
During his freshman year with the Virginia Tech Hokies, Maddy played in all 13 games. He started seven of these as a defensive tackle. While on defense, he played 350 snaps and had 19 tackles. He was one of seven freshman to see action on the team that year. Of his tackles, two were assisted tackles against Appalachian State, one was a solo tackle against Arkansas State, two were assisted tackles on 16 defensive snaps at Marshall, two were against Duke, and two were during the Sugar Bowl against Michigan. He also saw action on 58 defensive snaps against UNC and 16 against Marshall. In recognition of his performance, he was recognized as the defensive MVP during spring practice, for which he received the George Pass Award.

During his sophomore year, Maddy played in all 13 games and started in nine of them, recording 35 tackles, 461 defensive snaps, and 464 total plays through the year. Of his defensive snaps, 42 were during the opener against Georgia Tech, and 33 were against Austin Peay. Of his tackles, five were against Georgia Tech, three were against Pittsburgh, three were against Bowling Green, five were at Clemson, two were against Florida State, two were at Boston College, and seven were against Rutgers. He also made two quarterback hurries at Pittsburgh, one against Bowling Green, one at Miami, two at Boston College, two against Virginia, and one against Rutgers. He also earned the title of Iron Hokie after improving his bench press to 400 pounds and earned the Coaches Award for defensive player with an exceptional spring, which he shared with safety Detrick Bonner.

Maddy's junior year earned him a third-team All-ACC selection by ACSMA and his coaches, as well as the President's Award for outstanding leadership for his defense at the end of the spring season. He started all 13 games and participated in 672 plays, 664 as tackle and eight on special teams. He totaled 55 tackles, with four against Alabama, three against Western Carolina, five against Marshall, five at Georgia Tech, six against North Carolina, five against Pittsburgh, eight against Duke, three at Boston College, three at Miami, six against Maryland, two at Virginia, and three in the Sun Bowl against UCLA.

Maddy spent a total of five years at Virginia Tech. During his initial senior year in 2014–2015, he was given an honorable mention All-ACC selection by ACSMA and started the first four games of the season before undergoing surgery to repair a torn meniscus in his right knee. Despite his surgery, he logged 219 plays, 201 of which were at tackle, during games at William & Mary, Ohio State, East Carolina, and Georgia Tech before being sidelined the rest of the season due to an injury at East Carolina. He received a second surgery to repair the injury and was subsequently granted a medical hardship waiver. Despite his injury, he recorded his personal best bench press that year, at 450 pounds. Maddy returned in 2015–2016 to start in all 13 games, during which time he collected 57 tackles: 1.5 against Ohio State, 3 against Furman, one at Purdue, 10 at East Carolina, five against Pittsburgh, four against NC state, seven at Miami, six against Duke, one at Boston College, five at Georgia Tech, four versus North Carolina, four at Virginia, and three against Tulsa during the Independence Bowl.

== Professional career ==
Maddy was projected by USA Today’s DraftWire to be a potential late round pick in the 2016 NFL draft. He initially went undrafted but was invited to mini-camp with the New Orleans Saints the following month, May 2016. In 2017, he was invited to training camp with the CFL, where he was drafted by the BC Lions in February. Maddy was initially sidelined due to a broken wrist but debuted with the Lions in October 2017 against the Blue Bombers at Winnipeg. During the game, he recorded a defensive tackle and successfully kept the Bombers’ offence out of the end zone, contributing to his team’s 36–27 win.
