= 2016 Florida State Seminoles football team =

American college football season

2016 Florida State Seminoles football

Orange Bowl champion

Orange Bowl, W 33–32 vs. Michigan
- Conference: Atlantic Coast Conference
- Atlantic Division

Ranking
- Coaches: No. 8
- AP: No. 8
- Record: 10–3 (5–3 ACC)
- Head coach: Jimbo Fisher (7th season)
- Co-offensive coordinators: Lawrence Dawsey (3rd season); Randy Sanders (3rd season)
- Offensive scheme: Pro-style
- Defensive coordinator: Charles Kelly (3rd season)
- Base defense: 4–2–5
- Captains: Dalvin Cook; Roderick Johnson; Sean Maguire; Freddie Stevenson; DeMarcus Walker; Marquez White
- Home stadium: Doak Campbell Stadium

Uniform
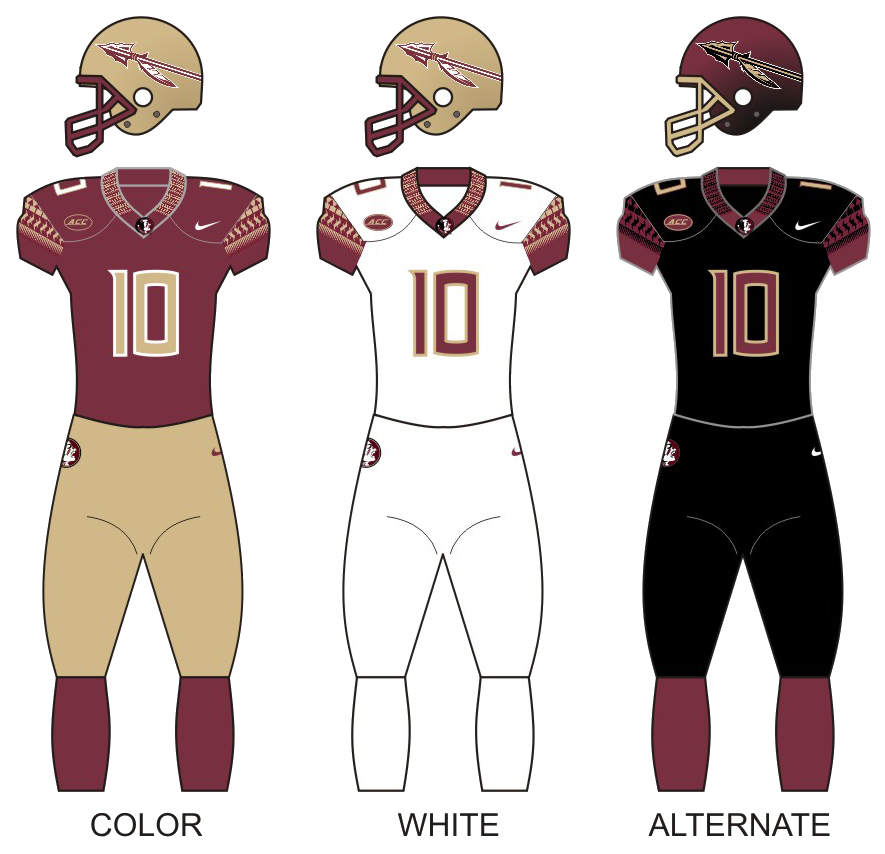

2016 Atlantic Coast Conference football standings
	Conf.			Overall
Team	W		L	W		L
Atlantic Division
No. 1 Clemson xy$#	7	–	1	14	–	1
No. 21 Louisville x	7	–	1	9	–	4
No. 8 Florida State	5	–	3	10	–	3
NC State	3	–	5	7	–	6
Wake Forest	3	–	5	7	–	6
Boston College	2	–	6	7	–	6
Syracuse	2	–	6	4	–	8
Coastal Division
No. 16 Virginia Tech xy	6	–	2	10	–	4
North Carolina	5	–	3	8	–	5
No. 20 Miami (FL)	5	–	3	9	–	4
Pittsburgh	5	–	3	8	–	5
Georgia Tech	4	–	4	9	–	4
Duke	1	–	7	4	–	8
Virginia	1	–	7	2	–	10
Championship: Clemson 42, Virginia Tech 35
# – College Football Playoff champion; $ – Conference champion; x – Division champion/co-champions; y – Championship game participant; Rankings from AP Poll

The 2016 Florida State Seminoles football team represented Florida State University in the sport of American football during the 2016 NCAA Division I FBS football season. The Seminoles competed in the Atlantic Division of the Atlantic Coast Conference and were led by seventh-year head coach Jimbo Fisher. Home games were played at Doak Campbell Stadium in Tallahassee, Florida.

In 2015, the Seminoles won 10 games and appeared in the Chick-fil-A Peach Bowl. Safety Jalen Ramsey and kicker Roberto Aguayo went on to be selected in the NFL draft.

Prior to the start of the 2016 season, Dalvin Cook, Derwin James, Roderick Johnson and DeMarcus Walker were named pre-season All-Americans. In the pre-season media poll, Florida State was picked to finish second in the ACC Atlantic and Dalvin Cook was picked as runner-up for ACC Player of the Year while Cook, Roderick Johnson, Travis Rudolph, DeMarcus Walker, and Derwin James were named to the pre-season All-ACC team.

Florida State finished the regular season with nine wins and was picked to play in the Orange Bowl, a fifth straight appearance in a major bowl game, where they defeated Michigan to finish with double digit wins for the fifth straight season and secure a top ten finish in the polls. During the season, the Seminoles notched their seventh consecutive win over Miami and their fourth consecutive win over Florida, making this senior class the first to go unbeaten against their rivals. Defensive end DeMarcus Walker and running back Dalvin Cook were named consensus All-Americans.

The season was documented on Showtime's A Season with Florida State Football.

== Before the season ==
=== Returning ===
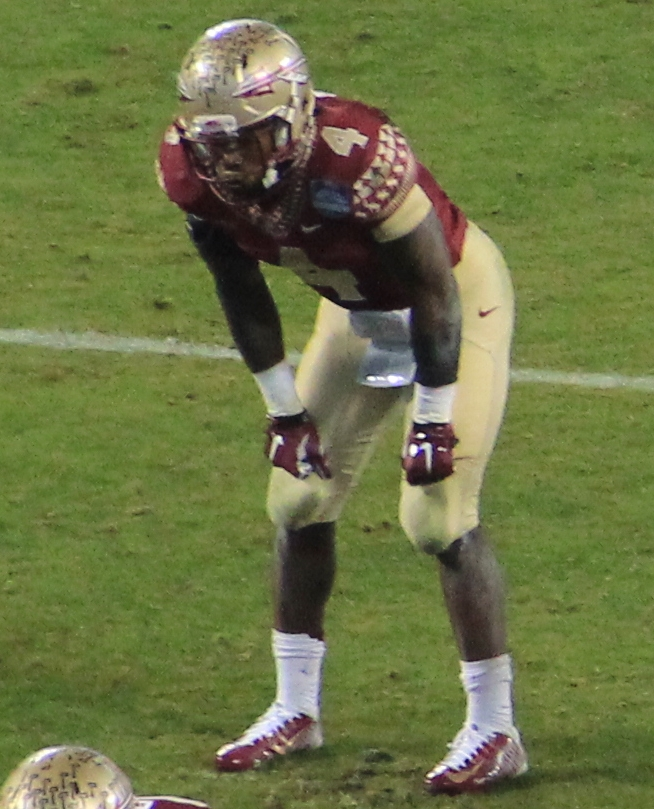
Running back Dalvin Cook is the leading rusher in school history.

Offense

- Sean Maguire
- Dalvin Cook
- Freddie Stevenson
- Jesus Wilson
- Travis Rudolph
- Kermit Whitfield
- Ermon Lane
- Ryan Izzo
- Roderick Johnson
- Kareem Are
- Alec Eberle
- Wilson Bell
- Brock Ruble
- Chad Mavety
- Ryan Hoefeld

Defense

- DeMarcus Walker
- Derrick Nnadi
- Josh Sweat
- Trey Marshall
- Ro'Derrick Hoskins
- Marquez White
- Derwin James
- Jacob Pugh
- Nate Andrews
- Matthew Thomas

=== Departures ===
Offense

- Everett Golson
- Mario Pender

Defense

- Nile Lawrence-Stample
- Reggie Northrup
- Terrance Smith
- Lamarcus Brutus
- Javien Elliott
- Tyler Hunter
- Tyrell Lyons
- Giorgio Newberry
- Jalen Ramsey
- Chris Casher
- Lorenzo Featherston (Medical DQ)

Special teams

- Roberto Aguayo
- Cason Beatty

=== Recruiting class ===
College recruiting (2016)
Name	Hometown	School	Height	Weight	40^{‡}	Commit date
Ricky Aguayo; K	Montverde, Florida	Montverde Academy	5 ft 11 in (1.80 m)	160 lb (73 kg)	N/A	Jun 6, 2015
Ricky Aguayo; K	Recruit ratings: Scout: Rivals: 247Sports: ESPN:					
Walvenski Aime; DT	Boca Raton, Florida	Fort Scott C.C.	6 ft 5 in (1.96 m)	295 lb (134 kg)	N/A	Oct 5, 2015
Walvenski Aime; DT	Recruit ratings: Scout: Rivals: 247Sports: ESPN:					
Mike Arnold; OT	Winter Haven, Florida	Winter Haven Senior HS	6 ft 6 in (1.98 m)	336 lb (152 kg)	N/A	Dec 12, 2015
Mike Arnold; OT	Recruit ratings: Scout: Rivals: 247Sports: ESPN:					
Josh Ball; OT	Fredericksburg, Virginia	Stafford Senior HS	6 ft 7 in (2.01 m)	297 lb (135 kg)	N/A	Jun 5, 2015
Josh Ball; OT	Recruit ratings: Scout: Rivals: 247Sports: ESPN:					
Carlos Becker; DB	Kissimmee, Florida	Osceola HS	6 ft 2 in (1.88 m)	185 lb (84 kg)	4.43	Feb 3, 2016
Carlos Becker; DB	Recruit ratings: Scout: Rivals: 247Sports: ESPN:					
Andrew Boselli; OG	Jacksonville, Florida	Episcopal HS	6 ft 4 in (1.93 m)	290 lb (130 kg)	N/A	Apr 16, 2015
Andrew Boselli; OG	Recruit ratings: Scout: Rivals: 247Sports: ESPN:					
Joshua Brown; LB	Charlotte, North Carolina	Mallard Creek HS	6 ft 3 in (1.91 m)	217 lb (98 kg)	N/A	Sep 21, 2014
Joshua Brown; LB	Recruit ratings: Scout: Rivals: 247Sports: ESPN:					
Brian Burns; DE	Fort Lauderdale, Florida	American Heritage HS	6 ft 4 in (1.93 m)	210 lb (95 kg)	N/A	Feb 3, 2016
Brian Burns; DE	Recruit ratings: Scout: Rivals: 247Sports: ESPN:					
Landon Dickerson; OT	Hudson, North Carolina	South Caldwell HS	6 ft 5 in (1.96 m)	300 lb (140 kg)	N/A	Feb 3, 2016
Landon Dickerson; OT	Recruit ratings: Scout: Rivals: 247Sports: ESPN:					
Keith Gavin; WR	Crawfordville, Florida	Wakulla HS	6 ft 3 in (1.91 m)	219 lb (99 kg)	N/A	Jan 29, 2016
Keith Gavin; WR	Recruit ratings: Scout: Rivals: 247Sports: ESPN:					
Malik Henry; QB	Long Beach, California	Long Beach Poly HS	6 ft 3 in (1.91 m)	185 lb (84 kg)	N/A	Nov 13, 2014
Malik Henry; QB	Recruit ratings: Scout: Rivals: 247Sports: ESPN:					
Dontavious Jackson; ILB	Houston, Texas	Alief Elsik HS	6 ft 2 in (1.88 m)	239 lb (108 kg)	N/A	Feb 3, 2016
Dontavious Jackson; ILB	Recruit ratings: Scout: Rivals: 247Sports: ESPN:					
Baveon Johnson; OC	Lakeland, Florida	Lake Gibson HS	6 ft 3 in (1.91 m)	310 lb (140 kg)	N/A	Mar 11, 2015
Baveon Johnson; OC	Recruit ratings: Scout: Rivals: 247Sports: ESPN:					
Keion Joyner; LB	Havelock, North Carolina	Havelock HS	6 ft 3 in (1.91 m)	220 lb (100 kg)	N/A	Jan 2, 2016
Keion Joyner; LB	Recruit ratings: Scout: Rivals: 247Sports: ESPN:					
Shavar Manuel; DT	Bradenton, Florida	IMG Academy	6 ft 4 in (1.93 m)	290 lb (130 kg)	N/A	Feb 3, 2016
Shavar Manuel; DT	Recruit ratings: Scout: Rivals: 247Sports: ESPN:					
Kyle Meyers; CB	New Orleans, Louisiana	Holy Cross HS	6 ft 0 in (1.83 m)	170 lb (77 kg)	N/A	Jun 11, 2015
Kyle Meyers; CB	Recruit ratings: Scout: Rivals: 247Sports: ESPN:					
Gabe Nabers; ATH	Valdosta, Georgia	Lowndes HS	6 ft 3 in (1.91 m)	243 lb (110 kg)	N/A	Jan 25, 2016
Gabe Nabers; ATH	Recruit ratings: Scout: Rivals: 247Sports: ESPN:					
Amir Rasul; RB	Miami, Florida	Coral Gables Senior HS	5 ft 10 in (1.78 m)	200 lb (91 kg)	N/A	Jul 27, 2015
Amir Rasul; RB	Recruit ratings: Scout: Rivals: 247Sports: ESPN:					
Emmett Rice; OLB	Miami, Florida	Norland HS	6 ft 3 in (1.91 m)	195 lb (88 kg)	N/A	Feb 4, 2015
Emmett Rice; OLB	Recruit ratings: Scout: Rivals: 247Sports: ESPN:					
Janarius Robinson; DE	Panama City, Florida	Bay HS	6 ft 5 in (1.96 m)	244 lb (111 kg)	N/A	Sep 21, 2014
Janarius Robinson; DE	Recruit ratings: Scout: Rivals: 247Sports: ESPN:					
Levonta Taylor; CB	Virginia Beach, Virginia	Ocean Lakes HS	5 ft 11 in (1.80 m)	182 lb (83 kg)	N/A	Apr 3, 2015
Levonta Taylor; CB	Recruit ratings: Scout: Rivals: 247Sports: ESPN:					
Logan Tyler; K	Nixa, Missouri	Nixa HS	6 ft 0 in (1.83 m)	190 lb (86 kg)	N/A	Jun 6, 2015
Logan Tyler; K	Recruit ratings: Scout: Rivals: 247Sports: ESPN:					
Naseir Upshur; TE	Philadelphia, Pennsylvania	Imhotep Institute	6 ft 2 in (1.88 m)	233 lb (106 kg)	N/A	Sep 1, 2015
Naseir Upshur; TE	Recruit ratings: Scout: Rivals: 247Sports: ESPN:					
Jauan Williams; OT	Washington, D.C.	Archbishop Carroll HS	6 ft 7 in (2.01 m)	303 lb (137 kg)	N/A	Feb 3, 2016
Jauan Williams; OT	Recruit ratings: Scout: Rivals: 247Sports: ESPN:					
Cedric Wood; DT	Tallahassee, Florida	Godby HS	6 ft 3 in (1.91 m)	309 lb (140 kg)	N/A	Feb 22, 2014
Cedric Wood; DT	Recruit ratings: Scout: Rivals: 247Sports: ESPN:					
Overall recruit ranking: Scout: 4 Rivals: 2 247Sports: 2 ESPN: 1
‡ Refers to 40-yard dash; Note: In many cases, Scout, Rivals, 247Sports, On3, and ESPN may conflict in their listings of height, weight and 40 time.; In these cases, the average was taken. ESPN grades are on a 100-point scale.; Sources: "Florida State 2016 Football Commitments". Rivals.; "2016 Florida State Commits". Scout.; "2016 Player Commitments – Florida State". ESPN.; "Scout.com Team Recruiting Rankings". Scout.; "2016 Team Ranking". Rivals.com.

Spring game

Florida State Spring Game

Quarter	1	2	3	4	Total
Gold	0	14	0	10	24
Garnet	0	3	7	14	24

at Citrus Bowl • Orlando, Florida

- Date: April 9
- Game time: 3:00 p.m. EST
- Game attendance: 49,913
- TV: ESPN3

== After the season ==
=== NFL draft ===
The following players were selected in the 2017 NFL draft:

Round	Pick	Overall	Name	Position	Team
2	9	41	Dalvin Cook	Running back	Minnesota Vikings
2	19	51	DeMarcus Walker	Defensive end	Denver Broncos
5	16	160	Roderick Johnson	Offensive tackle	Cleveland Browns
6	33	216	Marquez White	Cornerback	Dallas Cowboys

== Coaching staff ==
Florida State Seminoles coaches

Head coach

- Jimbo Fisher

Assistant coaches

- Rick Trickett – Assistant head coach and offensive line coach
- Charles Kelly – Defensive coordinator and secondary coach
- Randy Sanders – Co-Offensive coordinator/quarterbacks coach
- Lawrence Dawsey – Co-Offensive coordinator/wide receivers coach
- Brad lawing – Defensive head coach/defensive ends coach
- Odell Haggins – Associate coach/defensive line coach
- Jay Graham – Running backs coach/special teams coordinator
- Tim Brewster – Tight ends coach/recruiting coordinator
- Bill Miller – Linebackers coach
- Vic viloria – Head strength and conditioning coach

Support staff

- Addison Lynch
- Kurt Kennedy
- Jeremiah Wilson
- Brian Williams
- Jamie Mujeni
- Bert Biffani
- Jerry Johnson
- David Spurlock
- Tino Sunseri
- Matt McCutchan
- Andrew Priest
- Mike Warren
- Mario Edwards Sr.

== Media ==
Florida State football is broadcast on the Florida State University Seminoles Radio Network and the games are called by Gene Deckerhoff. In Tallahassee, games can be heard on WWOF.

== Rankings ==
Ranking movements Legend: ██ Increase in ranking ██ Decrease in ranking ( ) = First-place votes
	Week															
Poll	Pre	1	2	3	4	5	6	7	8	9	10	11	12	13	14	Final
AP	4 (5)	3 (4)	2 (4)	13	12	23	14	13	12	19	20	17	15	12	10	8
Coaches	4 (1)	3	2 (1)	14	12	21	16	15	14	19	18	15	14	12	10	8
CFP	Not released									22	18	17	14	12	11	Not released

== Schedule ==
Date	Time	Opponent	Rank	Site	TV	Result	Attendance
September 5	8:00 p.m.	vs. No. 11 Ole Miss*	No. 4	Camping World Stadium; Orlando, FL (Camping World Kickoff)	ESPN	W 45–34	63,042
September 10	12:30 p.m.	No. 7 (FCS) Charleston Southern*	No. 3	Doak Campbell Stadium; Tallahassee, FL	ACCRSN	W 52–8	75,831
September 17	Noon	at No. 10 Louisville	No. 2	Papa John's Cardinal Stadium; Louisville, KY (College GameDay)	ABC	L 20–63	55,632
September 24	Noon	at South Florida*	No. 13	Raymond James Stadium; Tampa, FL	ABC	W 55–35	61,665
October 1	3:30 p.m.	North Carolina	No. 12	Doak Campbell Stadium; Tallahassee, FL	ESPN	L 35–37	77,584
October 8	8:00 p.m.	at No. 10 Miami (FL)	No. 23	Hard Rock Stadium; Miami Gardens, FL (rivalry)	ABC	W 20–19	65,685
October 15	3:30 p.m.	Wake Forest^{†}	No. 14	Doak Campbell Stadium; Tallahassee, FL	ESPN	W 17–6	77,102
October 29	8:00 p.m.	No. 3 Clemson	No. 12	Doak Campbell Stadium; Tallahassee, FL (rivalry)	ABC	L 34–37	78,025
November 5	7:00 p.m.	at NC State	No. 22	Carter–Finley Stadium; Raleigh, NC	ESPNU	W 24–20	57,789
November 11	7:30 p.m.	Boston College	No. 18	Doak Campbell Stadium; Tallahassee, FL	ESPN2	W 45–7	73,917
November 19	3:30 p.m.	at Syracuse	No. 17	Carrier Dome; Syracuse, NY	ABC/ESPN2	W 45–14	32,340
November 26	8:00 p.m.	No. 15 Florida*	No. 14	Doak Campbell Stadium; Tallahassee, FL (rivalry)	ABC	W 31–13	78,342
December 30	8:00 p.m.	vs. No. 6 Michigan*	No. 11	Hard Rock Stadium; Miami Gardens, FL (Orange Bowl)	ESPN	W 33–32	67,432
*Non-conference game; ^{†}Homecoming; Rankings from AP Poll and CFP Rankings after November 1 released prior to game; All times are in Eastern time

== Game summaries ==
=== Ole Miss ===
Ole Miss vs. Florida State

Quarter	1	2	3	4	Total
No. 11 Rebels	7	21	0	6	34
No. 4 Seminoles	3	10	23	9	45

at Camping World Stadium, Orlando, Florida

- Date: September 5
- Game time: 8:06 p.m. EST
- Game weather: Temperature: 81 °F (27 °C) • Wind NE 13 mph (21 km/h) • Weather: Overcast, 72% humidity
- Game attendance: 63,042
- Referee: Brad Van Vark
- TV announcers (ESPN): Chris Fowler (play-by-play), Kirk Herbstreit (analyst), Samantha Ponder (sidelines)

=== Charleston Southern ===
Charleston Southern vs. Florida State

Quarter	1	2	3	4	Total
No. 7 (FCS) Buccaneers	0	6	0	2	8
No. 3 Seminoles	28	7	14	3	52

at Doak Campbell Stadium, Tallahassee, Florida

- Date: September 10
- Game time: 12:34 p.m. EST
- Game weather: Temperature: 88 °F (31 °C) • Wind W 4 mph (6.4 km/h) • Weather: Clear, 64% humidity
- Game attendance: 75,831
- Referee: Ron Cherry
- TV announcers (Fox Sports Sun): Wes Durham (play-by-play), James Bates (analyst), Jenn Hildreth (sidelines)

=== Louisville ===
Florida State vs. Louisville

Quarter	1	2	3	4	Total
No. 2 Seminoles	3	7	0	10	20
No. 10 Cardinals	14	21	14	14	63

at Papa John's Cardinal Stadium, Louisville, Kentucky

- Date: September 17
- Game time: 12:06 p.m. EST
- Game weather: Temperature: 73 °F (23 °C) • Wind S 14 mph (23 km/h) • Weather: Cloudy
- Game attendance: 55,632
- Referee: Jeff Flanagan
- TV announcers (ABC): Chris Fowler (play-by-play), Kirk Herbstreit (analyst), Samantha Ponder (sidelines)

=== South Florida ===
Florida State vs. South Florida

Quarter	1	2	3	4	Total
No. 13 Seminoles	28	10	7	10	55
Bulls	14	0	7	14	35

at Raymond James Stadium, Tampa, Florida

- Date: September 24
- Game time: 12:06 p.m. EST
- Game weather: Temperature: 88 °F (31 °C) • Wind NE 5 mph (8.0 km/h) • Weather: Mostly Sunny
- Game attendance: 61,665
- Referee: Ron Cherry
- TV announcers (ABC): Bob Wischusen (play-by-play), Brock Huard (analyst), Allison Williams (sidelines)

=== North Carolina ===
North Carolina vs. Florida State

Quarter	1	2	3	4	Total
Tar Heels	7	14	7	9	37
No. 12 Seminoles	0	7	7	21	35

at Doak Campbell Stadium, Tallahassee, Florida

- Date: October 1
- Game time: 3:35 p.m. EST
- Game weather: Temperature: 85 °F (29 °C) • Wind N 6 mph (9.7 km/h) • Weather: Clear
- Game attendance: 77,584
- Referee: Jeff Heaser
- TV announcers (ESPN): Mark Jones (play-by-play), Rod Gilmore (analyst), Quint Kessenich (sidelines)

=== Miami (FL) ===
Florida State vs. Miami (FL)

Quarter	1	2	3	4	Total
No. 23 Seminoles	0	3	14	3	20
No. 10 Hurricanes	3	10	0	6	19

at Hard Rock Stadium, Miami Gardens, Florida

- Date: October 8
- Game time: 8:16 p.m. EST
- Game weather: Temperature: 86 °F (30 °C) • Wind 8 mph (13 km/h) • Weather: Clear
- Game attendance: 65,685
- Referee: Duane Heydt
- TV announcers (ABC): Chris Fowler (play-by-play), Kirk Herbstreit (analyst), Samantha Ponder (sidelines)

=== Wake Forest ===
Wake Forest vs. Florida State

Quarter	1	2	3	4	Total
Demon Deacons	0	3	3	0	6
No. 14 Seminoles	3	7	7	0	17

at Doak Campbell Stadium, Tallahassee, Florida

- Date: October 15
- Game time: 3:35 p.m. EST
- Game weather: Temperature: 83 °F (28 °C) • Wind E 8 mph (13 km/h) • Weather: Partly Cloudy
- Game attendance: 77,102
- Referee: Stuart Mullins
- TV announcers (ESPN): Bob Wischusen (play-by-play), Brock Huard (analyst), Allison Williams (sidelines)

=== Clemson ===
Clemson vs. Florida State

Quarter	1	2	3	4	Total
No. 3 Tigers	14	3	3	17	37
No. 12 Seminoles	0	14	14	6	34

at Doak Campbell Stadium, Tallahassee, Florida

- Date: October 29
- Game time: 8:22 p.m. EST
- Game weather: Temperature: 72 °F (22 °C) • Wind: Calm • Weather: Clear
- Game attendance: 78,025
- Referee: Jeff Heaser
- TV announcers (ABC): Chris Fowler (play-by-play), Kirk Herbstreit (analyst), Samantha Ponder (sidelines)

=== NC State ===
Florida State vs. NC State

Quarter	1	2	3	4	Total
No. 19 Seminoles	0	10	7	7	24
Wolfpack	7	6	7	0	20

at Carter–Finley Stadium, Raleigh, North Carolina

- Date: November 5
- Game time: 7:02 p.m. EST
- Game weather: Temperature: 60 °F (16 °C) • Wind N 2 mph (3.2 km/h) • Weather: Clear
- Game attendance: 57,789
- Referee: Duane Heydt
- TV announcers (ESPNU): Anish Shroff (play-by-play), Ahmad Brooks (analyst), Kevin Weidl (sidelines)

=== Boston College ===
Boston College vs. Florida State

Quarter	1	2	3	4	Total
Eagles	0	0	0	7	7
No. 20 Seminoles	14	7	14	10	45

at Doak Campbell Stadium, Tallahassee, Florida

- Date: November 11
- Game time: 7:31 p.m. EST
- Game weather: Temperature: 62 °F (17 °C) • Wind S 4 mph (6.4 km/h) • Weather: Partly Cloudy
- Game attendance: 73,917
- Referee: Gary Peterson
- TV announcers (ESPN2): Adam Amin (play-by-play), Mack Brown (analyst), Olivia Harlan (sidelines)

=== Syracuse ===
Florida State vs. Syracuse

Quarter	1	2	3	4	Total
No. 17 Seminoles	14	7	21	3	45
Orange	0	7	7	0	14

at Carrier Dome, Syracuse, New York

- Date: November 19
- Game time: 3:32 p.m. EST
- Game weather: Indoors
- Game attendance: 32,340
- Referee: Jerry Magallanes
- TV announcers (ABC/ESPN2): Beth Mowins (play-by-play), Anthony Becht (analyst), Rocky Boiman (sidelines)

=== Florida ===
Florida vs. Florida State

Quarter	1	2	3	4	Total
No. 13 Gators	0	3	3	7	13
No. 15 Seminoles	7	3	7	14	31

at Doak Campbell Stadium, Tallahassee, Florida

- Date: November 26
- Game time: 8:14 p.m. EST
- Game weather: Temperature: 53 °F (12 °C) • Wind N 10 mph (16 km/h) • Weather: Clear
- Game attendance: 78,342
- Referee: Jeff Flanagan
- TV announcers (ABC): Joe Tessitore (play-by-play), Todd Blackledge (analyst), Holly Rowe (sidelines)

=== Orange Bowl: Michigan ===
Michigan vs. Florida State (Orange Bowl)

Quarter	1	2	3	4	Total
No. 6 Wolverines	3	3	9	17	32
No. 10 Seminoles	17	3	0	13	33

at Hard Rock Stadium, Miami Gardens, Florida

- Date: December 30
- Game time: 8:11 p.m. EST
- Game weather: Temperature: 61 °F (16 °C) • Wind N 11 mph (18 km/h) • Weather: Mostly Cloudy
- Game attendance: 67,432
- Referee: Matt Austin
- TV announcers (ESPN): Steve Levy (play-by-play), Brian Griese (analyst), Todd McShay (sidelines)

== Awards ==
- Bronko Nagurski Award finalist

Tarvarus McFadden

- Doak Walker Award finalist

Dalvin Cook

- Ted Hendricks Award finalist

DeMarcus Walker

- Maxwell Award semifinalist

Dalvin Cook

- Walter Camp Award semifinalist

Dalvin Cook

=== Watchlists ===
- Dodd Trophy

Jimbo Fisher

- Rimington Trophy

Alec Eberle

- Lott Trophy

Derwin James

- Maxwell Award

Dalvin Cook

- Bednarik Award

Derwin James
DeMarcus Walker

- John Mackey Award

Ryan Izzo

- Outland Trophy

Roderick Johnson

- Nagurski Award

Derwin James
DeMarcus Walker

- Jim Thorpe Award

Derwin James

- Biletnikoff Award

Kermit Whitfield
Travis Rudolph

- Wuerffel Trophy

Alec Eberle

- Doak Walker Award

Dalvin Cook

- Walter Camp Award

Dalvin Cook
Derwin James

- Lombardi Award

DeMarcus Walker
Roderick Johnson
Dalvin Cook

- Manning Award

Deondre Francois

=== Honors ===
Weekly awards
Player	Award	Date Awarded	Ref.
Deondre Francois	ACC Offensive Back of the Week; ACC Rookie of the Week; Freshman Player of the Week; Davey O'Brien Quarterback of the Week ACC Rookie of the Week ACC Rookie of the Week ACC Co-Rookie of the Week	September 5, 2016; October 8, 2016; October 15, 2016; November 5, 2016	
DeMarcus Walker	ACC Defensive Lineman of the Week; National Player of the Week; Chuck Bednarik Award Player of the Week ACC Defensive Lineman of the Week; Chuck Bednarik Award Player of the Week	September 5, 2016; November 5, 2016	
Derwin James	ACC Defensive Back of the Week	September 5, 2016	
Ricky Aguayo	ACC Specialist of the Week; Lou Groza Award Star of the Week	September 5, 2016	
Travis Rudolph	ACC Receiver of the Week ACC Receiver of the Week	September 10, 2016; October 15, 2016	
Roderick Johnson	ACC Offensive Lineman of the Week ACC Offensive Lineman of the Week	September 24, 2016; November 19, 2016	
Dalvin Cook	ACC Offensive Back of the Week ACC Offensive Back of the Week; TaxSlayer Bowl Player of the Week Orange Bowl MVP	October 8, 2016; November 19, 2016; December 30, 2016	
Derrick Nnadi	ACC Co-defensive Lineman of the Week	October 29, 2016	
Nyqwan Murray	ACC Receiver of the Week	November 5, 2016	
Brian Burns	ACC Rookie of the Week	November 19, 2016	

Yearly awards
Player	Award	Ref.
Deondre Francois	ACC Rookie of the Year & ACC Offensive Rookie of the Year	
DeMarcus Walker	ACC Defensive Player of the Year	
Roderick Johnson	Jacobs Blocking Trophy	
Tarvarus McFadden	Jack Tatum Trophy	
Dalvin Cook	Runner of the Year	

==== All-ACC ====
Name	Selection
Roderick Johnson*	First Team (Offense)
Dalvin Cook*	First Team (Offense)
DeMarcus Walker*	First Team (Defense)
Tarvarus McFadden*	First Team (Defense)
Travis Rudolph*	Second Team (Offense)
Kareem Are*	Second Team (Offense)
Derrick Nnadi*	Third Team/First Team (Defense)
Wilson Bell	Honorable Mention (Offense)
Alec Eberle	Honorable Mention (Offense)
Ricky Aguayo*	Honorable Mention (Offense)
Demarcus Christmas	Honorable Mention (Defense)
Marquez White	Honorable Mention (Defense)
Matthew Thomas	Honorable Mention (Defense)
Jacob Pugh	Honorable Mention (Defense)
Trey Marshall	Honorable Mention (Defense)
*indicates selection by media and coaches

==== All-Americans ====
Name	AP	AFCA	FWAA	TSN	WCFF	USA Today	Athlon	CBS	ESPN	SI
Dalvin Cook†	1st	1st	1st	1st	1st	1st	1st	1st	1st	2nd
DeMarcus Walker	2nd	1st		1st	1st	1st	1st	2nd		2nd
Roderick Johnson		2nd		2nd	1st					2nd
Tarvarus McFadden		2nd	1st		2nd
Brian Burns	Fresh.		Fresh.			Fresh.			Fresh.
Ricky Aguayo									Fresh.
†denotes unanimous selection. NCAA recognizes a selection to all five of the AP, AFCA, FWAA, SN and WCFF 1st teams for unanimous selections and three of five for consensus selections.
