= 2016 All-America college football team =

Official list of the best college football players of 2016

The 2016 All-America college football team includes those players of American college football who have been honored by various selector organizations as the best players at their respective positions. The selector organizations award the "All-America" honor annually following the conclusion of the fall college football season. The original All-America team was the 1889 All-America college football team selected by Caspar Whitney and Walter Camp. In 1950, the National Collegiate Athletic Bureau, which is the National Collegiate Athletic Association's (NCAA) service bureau, compiled the first list of All-Americans including first-team selections on teams created for a national audience that received national circulation with the intent of recognizing selections made from viewpoints that were nationwide. Since 1957, College Sports Information Directors of America (CoSIDA) has bestowed Academic All-American recognition on male and female athletes in Divisions I, II, and III of the NCAA as well as National Association of Intercollegiate Athletics athletes, covering all NCAA championship sports.

The 2016 All-America college football team is composed of the following All-America first teams chosen by the following selector organizations: Associated Press (AP), Football Writers Association of America (FWAA), American Football Coaches Association (AFCA), Walter Camp Foundation (WCFF), The Sporting News (TSN), Sports Illustrated (SI), USA Today (USAT), ESPN, CBS Sports (CBS), College Football News (CFN), Scout.com, Athlon Sports, and Fox Sports (FOX).

Currently, the NCAA compiles consensus all-America teams in the sports of Division I-FBS football and Division I men's basketball using a point system computed from All-America teams named by coaches associations or media sources. Players are chosen against other players playing at their position only. To be selected a consensus All-American, players must be chosen to the first team on at least two of the five official selectors as recognized by the NCAA. Second- and third-team honors are used to break ties. Players named first-team to all five selectors are deemed unanimous All-Americans. Currently, the NCAA recognizes All-Americans selected by the AP, AFCA, FWAA, TSN, and the WCFF to determine consensus and unanimous All-Americans. The AFCA began selecting a second team in 2016.

Twenty-seven players were recognized as consensus All-Americans for 2016, 14 of them being unanimous. Unanimous selections are followed by an asterisk (*).

2016 Consensus All-Americans
Name	Position	Year	University
Lamar Jackson*	Quarterback	Sophomore	Louisville
Dalvin Cook*	Running back	Junior	Florida State
D'Onta Foreman	Running back	Junior	Texas
Corey Davis	Wide receiver	Senior	Western Michigan
Dede Westbrook*	Wide receiver	Senior	Oklahoma
Jake Butt	Tight end	Senior	Michigan
Cody O'Connell*	Offensive line	Junior	Washington State
Ryan Ramczyk	Offensive line	Junior	Wisconsin
Cam Robinson*	Offensive line	Junior	Alabama
Connor Williams	Offensive line	Sophomore	Texas
Pat Elflein*	Center	Senior	Ohio State
Jonathan Allen*	Defensive line	Senior	Alabama
Derek Barnett	Defensive line	Junior	Tennessee
Myles Garrett*	Defensive line	Junior	Texas A&M
DeMarcus Walker	Defensive line	Senior	Florida State
Zach Cunningham*	Linebacker	Junior	Vanderbilt
Reuben Foster*	Linebacker	Senior	Alabama
Jabrill Peppers*	Linebacker	Junior	Michigan
Adoree' Jackson*	Defensive back	Junior	USC
Jourdan Lewis	Defensive back	Senior	Michigan
Malik Hooker*	Defensive back	Sophomore	Ohio State
Budda Baker	Defensive back	Junior	Washington
Minkah Fitzpatrick	Defensive back	Sophomore	Alabama
Tre'Davious White	Defensive back	Senior	LSU
Zane Gonzalez*	Kicker	Senior	Arizona State
Mitch Wishnowsky*	Punter	Sophomore	Utah
Quadree Henderson	All-purpose	Sophomore	Pittsburgh

== Offense ==
=== Quarterback ===
- Lamar Jackson, Louisville (AFCA, FWAA, AP, WCFF, TSN, SI, USAT, ESPN, FOX, CBS, Athlon)

=== Running back ===
- Dalvin Cook, Florida State (AFCA, FWAA, AP, WCFF, TSN, USAT, ESPN, FOX, CBS, Athlon)
- D'Onta Foreman, Texas (AFCA, FWAA, AP, TSN, SI, USAT, ESPN, FOX, CBS, Athlon)
- Donnel Pumphrey, San Diego State (WCFF, SI)

=== Wide receiver ===
- Corey Davis, Western Michigan (AFCA, FWAA, AP, SI, USAT, FOX, CBS, Athlon)
- Zay Jones, East Carolina (WCFF, TSN, ESPN)
- John Ross, Washington (ESPN)
- Dede Westbrook, Oklahoma (AFCA, FWAA, AP, WCFF, TSN, SI, USAT, ESPN, FOX, CBS, Athlon)

=== Tight end ===
- Jake Butt, Michigan (AFCA, WCFF)
- Evan Engram, Ole Miss (AP, TSN, SI, USAT, CBS, Athlon)
- O. J. Howard, Alabama (FOX)
- Michael Roberts, Toledo (FWAA)

=== Offensive line ===
- Dan Feeney, Indiana (AP, FOX)
- Dorian Johnson, Pittsburgh (AFCA, TSN, SI, ESPN)
- Roderick Johnson, Florida State (WCFF)
- Cody O'Connell, Washington State (AFCA, FWAA, AP, WCFF, TSN, SI, USAT, ESPN, FOX, CBS, Athlon)
- Ethan Pocic, LSU (FWAA)
- Billy Price, Ohio State (AFCA)
- Ryan Ramczyk, Wisconsin (AP, TSN, SI, USAT, ESPN, FOX, CBS, Athlon)
- Cam Robinson, Alabama (AFCA, FWAA, AP, WCFF, TSN, SI, ESPN, FOX, CBS, Athlon)
- Nico Siragusa, San Diego State (USAT)
- Connor Williams, Texas (FWAA, WCFF, USAT, CBS, Athlon)

=== Center ===
- Pat Elflein, Ohio State (AFCA, FWAA, AP, WCFF, TSN, SI, USAT, ESPN, FOX, CBS, Athlon)

== Defense ==
=== Defensive line ===
- Jonathan Allen, Alabama (AFCA, FWAA, AP, WCFF, TSN, SI, USAT, ESPN, FOX, CBS)
- Derek Barnett, Tennessee (AP, WCFF, SI, USAT, ESPN, FOX, CBS)
- Myles Garrett, Texas A&M (AFCA, FWAA, AP, WCFF, TSN, FOX)
- Carl Lawson, Auburn (FWAA)
- Ed Oliver, Houston (AP, TSN, SI, USAT, ESPN, FOX, CBS)
- DeMarcus Walker, Florida State (AFCA, WCFF, TSN, USAT)
- Carlos Watkins, Clemson, (CBS)
- Christian Wilkins, Clemson (AFCA, FWAA)

=== Linebacker ===
- Zach Cunningham, Vanderbilt (AFCA, FWAA, AP, WCFF, TSN, SI, USAT, ESPN, FOX, CBS)
- Reuben Foster, Alabama (AFCA, FWAA, AP, WCFF, TSN, SI, USAT, ESPN, FOX, CBS)
- Jabrill Peppers, Michigan (AFCA, FWAA, AP, WCFF, TSN, SI, USAT, ESPN, FOX, CBS)
- T. J. Watt, Wisconsin (SI, ESPN)

=== Defensive back ===
- Jamal Adams, LSU (USAT, CBS)
- Budda Baker, Washington (FWAA, TSN, SI, ESPN, FOX)
- Minkah Fitzpatrick, Alabama (AFCA, AP, ESPN)
- Malik Hooker, Ohio State (AFCA, FWAA, AP, WCFF, TSN, SI, USAT, ESPN, FOX, CBS)
- Marlon Humphrey, Alabama (FWAA)
- Adoree' Jackson, Southern California (AP, WCFF, TSN, FOX, CBS)
- Desmond King, Iowa (SI, USAT, FOX)
- Jourdan Lewis, Michigan (AFCA, AP, WCFF, TSN, SI, ESPN, CBS)
- Tarvarus McFadden, Florida State (FWAA)
- Cordrea Tankersley, Clemson (USAT)
- Tre'Davious White, LSU (AFCA, WCFF)

== Special teams ==
=== Kicker ===
- Zane Gonzalez, Arizona State (AFCA, FWAA, AP, WCFF, TSN, SI, USAT, ESPN, FOX, CBS)

=== Punter ===
- Johnny Townsend, Florida (CBS)
- Mitch Wishnowsky, Utah (AFCA, FWAA, AP, WCFF, TSN, SI, USAT, ESPN, FOX)

=== All-purpose / return specialist ===
- Quadree Henderson, Pittsburgh (FWAA, WCFF, TSN, SI, USAT, FOX, CBS)
- Adoree' Jackson, Southern California (AFCA, FWAA, SI, ESPN, CBS)
- Christian McCaffrey, Stanford (FOX)
- Jabrill Peppers, Michigan (CBS)
- Curtis Samuel, Ohio State (AP, TSN)

== See also ==
- 2016 All-ACC football team
- 2016 All-SEC football team
- 2016 All-Big Ten Conference football team
- 2016 All-Big 12 Conference football team
- 2016 All-Pac-12 Conference football team
