= Jake Butt =

American football player (born 1995)

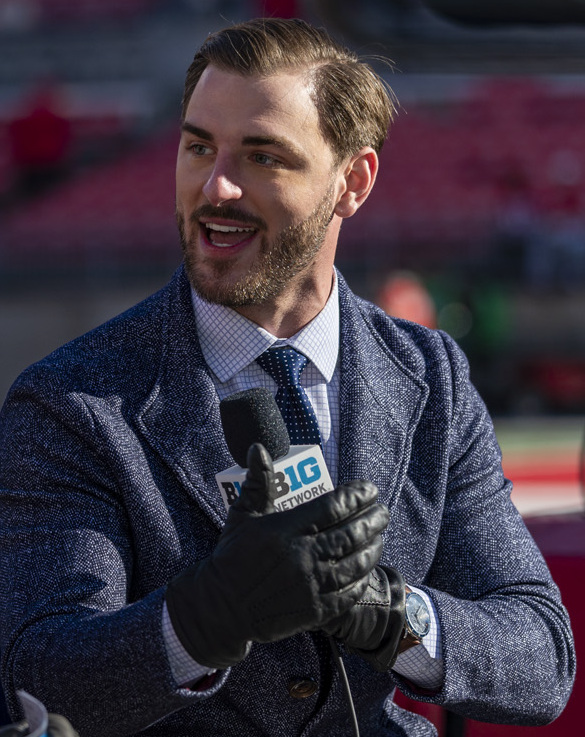
- Butt in 2022

No. 80, 44
- Position: Tight end

Personal information
- Born: July 11, 1995 (age 31); Pickerington, Ohio, U.S.
- Listed height: 6 ft 6 in (1.98 m)
- Listed weight: 250 lb (113 kg)

Career information
- High school: Pickerington North
- College: Michigan
- NFL draft: 2017: 5th round, 145th overall pick

Career history
- Denver Broncos (2017–2020); Chicago Bears (2021)*
- * Offseason or practice squad member only

Awards and highlights
- John Mackey Award (2016); Ozzie Newsome Award (2015); Consensus All-American (2016); First-team All-American (2015); 2× Big Ten Tight End of the Year (2015, 2016); 2× First-team All-Big Ten (2015, 2016)

Career NFL statistics
- Receptions: 10
- Receiving yards: 90
- Stats at Pro Football Reference

Jonathan Duane "Jake" Butt (born July 11, 1995) is an American former professional football player who was a tight end for the Denver Broncos of the National Football League (NFL). He played college football at the University of Michigan. He was selected as a two-time All-American and was a two-time Big Ten Tight End of the Year. Also winning the Ozzie Newsome Award, John Mackey Award and the Senior CLASS Award. He was selected by the Denver Broncos in the fifth round of the 2017 NFL draft.

In 2022 he began a new career in broadcasting, working for the Big Ten Network as an analyst. His inaugural game was on September 10, 2022, his alma mater Michigan versus Hawaii.

== Early life ==
Butt was born in 1995 and raised in Pickerington, Ohio, attending Pickerington High School North. Butt caught 96 passes for 1,361 yards with 20 touchdowns and posted 142 tackles and 20.5 sacks during his high school career. He hauled in 68 receptions for 907 yards with 12 touchdowns as a senior and received Associated Press Division I All-Ohio first-team recognition. Butt attended but did not participate in the Army All-America Game due to injury.

Recruiting service Rivals.com rated Butt as a four-star recruit in the 2013 class. On February 19, 2013, Butt announced through Twitter his commitment to the Michigan Wolverines.

== College career ==
=== Freshman season ===
Butt enrolled at the University of Michigan in 2013. He made his collegiate debut on August 31, 2013, and made his first career catch for an 8-yard gain in a victory over Central Michigan. On November 16, 2013, Butt caught his first career touchdown on an 11-yard pass from Devin Gardner, helping Michigan secure a win over Northwestern. On November 30, 2013, Butt caught a season-high five passes for 85 receiving yards and a touchdown as the Wolverines lost 42–41 to longtime rival Ohio State. He appeared in 13 games and started eight for the 2013 Michigan Wolverines football team. His playing time increased after Devin Funchess moved from tight end to wide receiver. He finished his first season at Michigan with 20 receptions for 235 yards and two touchdowns and was selected by ESPN.com as a member of the All-Big Ten Conference freshman team.

=== Sophomore season ===
The following season, Butt missed the first two games of the season while recuperating from a torn ACL. He made his season debut in Week 3 and caught three receptions for a season-high 59 receiving yards and scored a touchdown on a 29-yard pass from Devin Gardner in a 34–10 victory over Miami University. On November 29, 2014, Butt caught a season-high four passes for 35-yards and a touchdown during Michigan's 28–42 loss to #7 Ohio State. He appeared in nine games in 2014, five as a starter, and recorded 21 receptions for 211 receiving yards and two touchdowns. After Michigan finished the season 5–7, head coach Brady Hoke was relieved of his duties.

=== Junior season ===
During Michigan's season-opening 17–24 loss against Utah, Butt made a career-high eight receptions for 92-yards and caught an 8-yard touchdown pass from Jake Rudock. His eight catches was the most by a Michigan tight end since 1995. On November 7, 2015, he finished a 49–16 win over Rutgers with a career-high 102 receiving yards on four receptions. He finished the 2015 season with 51 catches for 654 receiving yards (12.8 yds/catch) and three touchdowns, while starting all 13 games. He was named the Kwalick–Clark Tight End of the Year, was named to the All-Big Ten offensive first-team, by both the coaches and media, and named a first-team All-American by Sports Illustrated and CBS Sports. He also won the Ozzie Newsome Award as the best tight end in college football.

=== Senior season ===
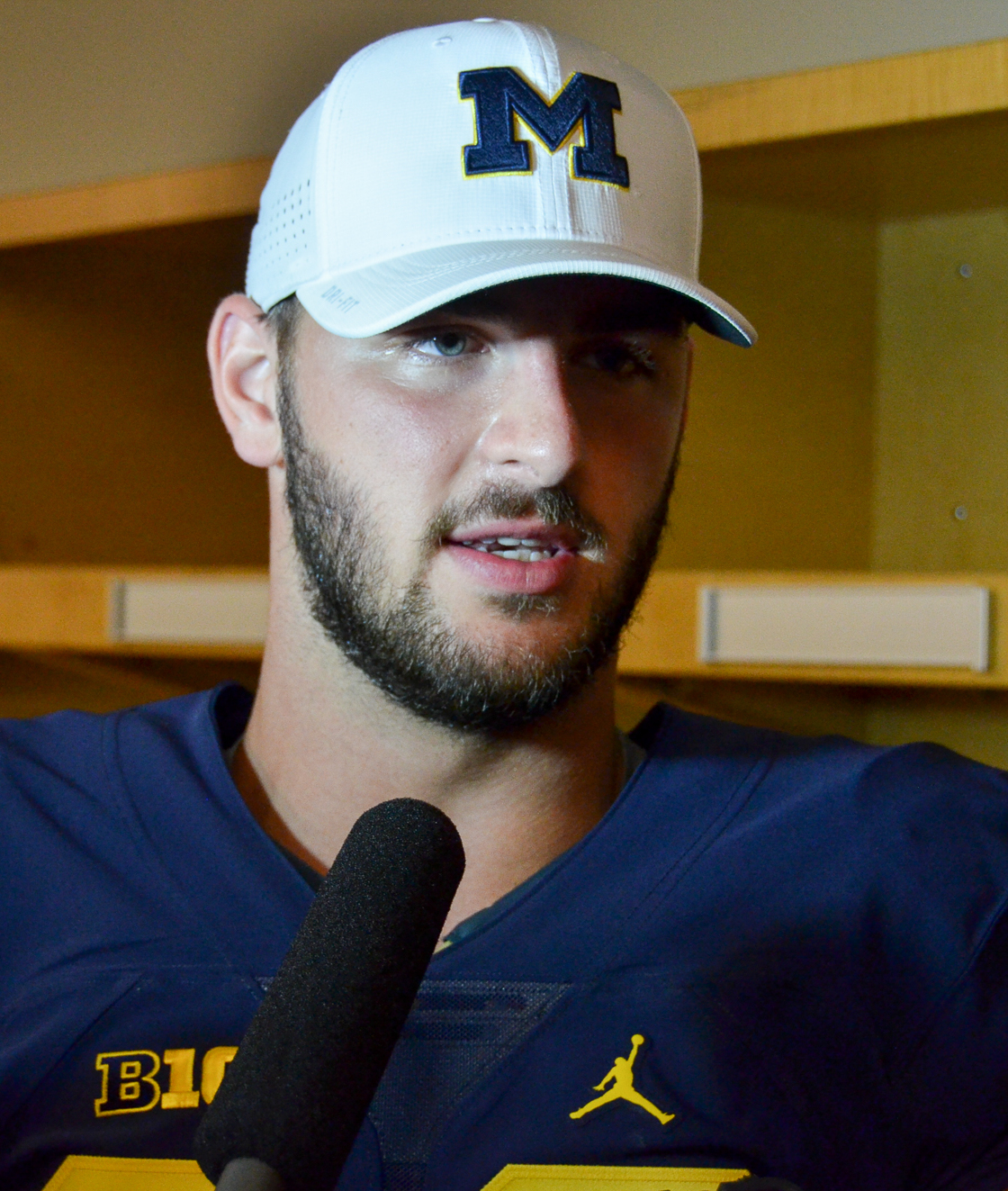
Butt in 2016

Butt opted to return for his senior season after considering entering the 2016 NFL draft. The majority of NFL draft experts and analysts projected him to be a second round pick in 2016. In August 2016, Butt and defensive end Chris Wormley were selected by a vote of their teammates as the team captains for the 2016 Michigan team. Through the first three games of the 2016 season, Butt led the Wolverines with 15 receptions, and he was second behind Amara Darboh with 192 receiving yards. During the 2016 season, Butt was the team's second-leading receiver with 43 receptions for 518 yards and four touchdowns, including 29 of those catches that netted a first down. He became both Michigan's all-time leading receiver in yards by a tight end (1,646 yards) and the program's record holder for career receptions by a tight end (136). Following the 2016 season, Butt was named to the All-Big Ten offensive first-team, by both the coaches and media, named a first-team All-American by the Walter Camp Football Foundation, and earned the Kwalick–Clark Tight End of the Year for the second straight season. He was also awarded the John Mackey Award, honoring the most outstanding tight end in college football. Butt tore his ACL in the 2016 Orange Bowl game. Butt was named the 2016 Senior CLASS Award winner.

=== Statistics ===
Season	Team	Conf	G	Receiving				Rushing			
Season	Team	Conf	G	Rec	Yds	Avg	TD	Att	Yds	Avg	TD
2013	Michigan	Big Ten	9	20	235	11.8	2	0	0	0.0	0
2014	Michigan	Big Ten	9	21	211	10.0	2	0	0	0.0	0
2015	Michigan	Big Ten	13	51	654	12.8	3	0	0	0.0	0
2016	Michigan	Big Ten	12	46	546	11.9	4	0	0	0.0	0
Career			35	138	1,646	11.9	11	0	0	0.0	0
All values from Sports Reference

== Professional career ==
=== Pre-draft ===
Pre-draft measurables
Height	Weight	Arm length	Hand span	Wingspan
6 ft 5 1/2 in (1.97 m)	246 lb (112 kg)	32 in (0.81 m)	10 in (0.25 m)	6 ft 5 in (1.96 m)
All values from NFL Combine

Butt was projected to be a second round pick in the 2017 NFL draft by NFL draft experts and scouts before he tore his ACL in the Orange Bowl during the last collegiate game of his career. NFL draft analyst Todd McShay projected Butt to be selected within the first 50 picks in the 2017 NFL Draft prior to his injury. On January 11, 2017, Butt successfully underwent surgery to reconstruct his torn ACL. Butt was unable to participate in drills at the NFL Scouting Combine and at Michigan's pro day. At the conclusion of the pre-draft process, Butt was projected to be a second or third round pick by NFL draft experts and scouts. He was ranked as the fifth best tight end in the draft by NFL draft analyst Mike Mayock and was ranked the sixth best tight end by DraftScout.com.

External videos
- Broncos draft Jake Butt 145th overall
- Mike Mayock's analysis of Jake Butt

=== Denver Broncos ===
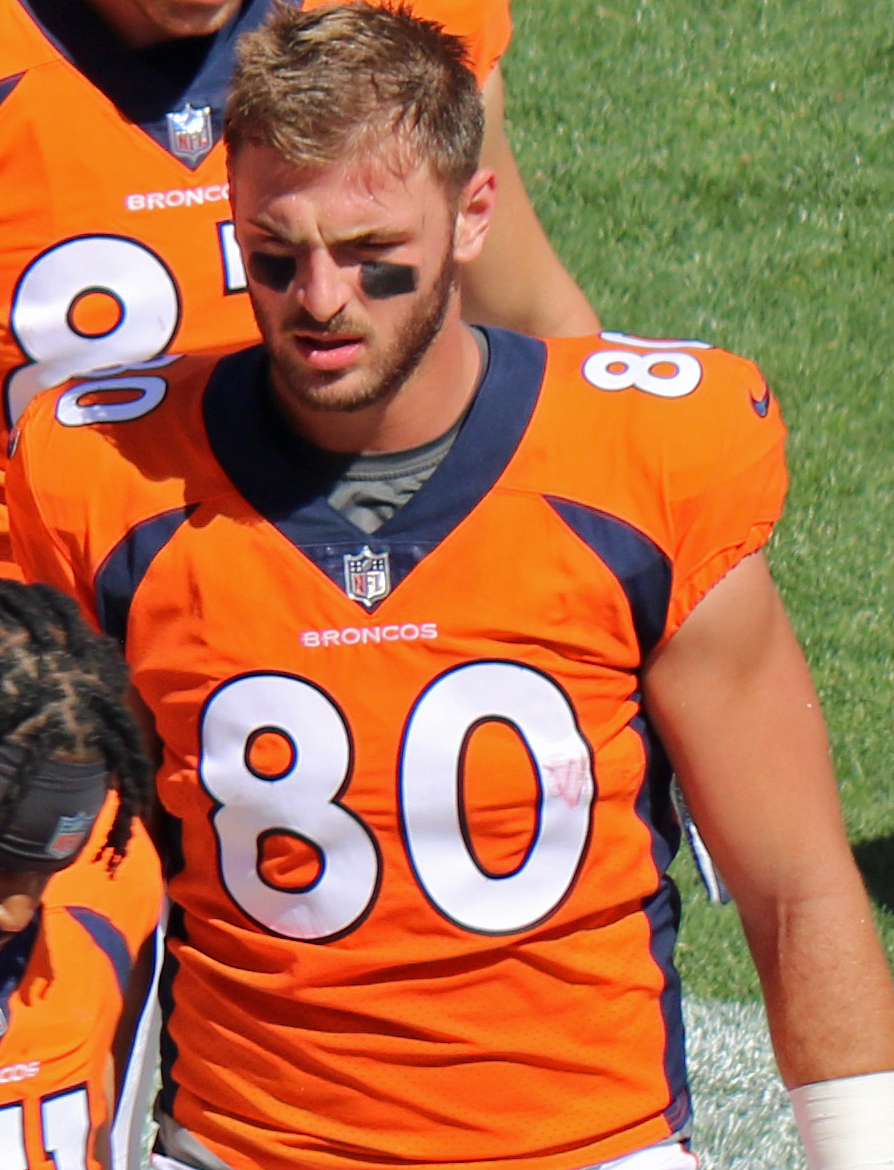
Butt with the Broncos in 2018

The Denver Broncos selected Butt in the fifth round with the 145th overall pick in the 2017 NFL Draft. Butt was the eighth tight end drafted in 2017. Butt reportedly received a $543,000 payout due to a loss-of-value insurance claim he received due to his ACL injury. The loss-of-value insurance was a rider on top of a disability insurance that Butt bought prior to the draft that would pay out if he was not picked in the top half of the third round due to injury.

On May 11, 2017, the Broncos signed Butt to a four-year, $2.70 million contract that included a signing bonus of $300,938.

He was placed on the reserve/non-football injury list on September 2, 2017, due to the torn ACL suffered his senior year. On November 6, 2017, the Broncos placed Butt on injured reserve for the remainder of the 2017 NFL season.

Butt recovered in time to participate physically in training camp in 2018. During training camp, he competed to be the starting tight end against Jeff Heuerman, Matt LaCosse, and Troy Fumagalli. Head coach Vance Joseph named Butt the secondary starting tight end to start the regular season, behind primary starting tight end Heuerman.

He made his professional regular season debut and first career start in the Broncos' season opener against the Seattle Seahawks and caught two passes for 29 yards in their 27–24 victory. On September 27, 2018, Butt sustained a torn ACL during a non-contact drill during practice, which sidelined him for the remainder of the season.

On September 2, 2019, Butt was placed on injured reserve due to complications with his previous ACL injury.

Butt played in five games before being placed on injured reserve with a hamstring injury on November 3, 2020. He was activated on December 31, 2020. After the season, Butt became a free agent due to his contract expiring.

=== Chicago Bears ===
On June 18, 2021, Butt signed a contract with the Chicago Bears. On July 28, 2021, Butt announced his retirement from the NFL.

== Post-football career ==
In 2024, Butt was announced as brand ambassador for Charles Tyrwhitt, a brand of dress clothing for men.

Butt occasionally serves as a member of the commentary team for UFL broadcasts on Fox. He is a color analyst for Big Ten Network and co-hosts The Big College Football Show on Chicago Sports Network.
