= Matthew Thomas (linebacker) =

American football player (born 1995)

Profile
- Position: Defensive line

Personal information
- Born: July 21, 1995 (age 31); Miami, Florida, U.S.
- Listed height: 6 ft 3 in (1.91 m)
- Listed weight: 230 lb (104 kg)

Career information
- High school: Booker T. Washington (Miami, Florida)
- College: Florida State (2013–2017)
- NFL draft: 2018: undrafted

Career history
- Pittsburgh Steelers (2018); Baltimore Ravens (2019)*; St. Louis BattleHawks (2020)*; Saskatchewan Roughriders (2020–2021); Edmonton Elks (2022–2023)
- * Offseason or practice squad member only

Awards and highlights
- BCS national champion (2013)

Career NFL statistics
- Total tackles: 4
- Stats at Pro Football Reference

Matthew Thomas (born July 21, 1995) is an American professional football linebacker. He played college football at Florida State. He signed with the Pittsburgh Steelers as an undrafted free agent in 2018.

== Early life ==
Matthew grew up the 4th oldest out of 8 kids in the Overtown Section of Miami-Dade County. Growing up very poor Thomas found his niche in football and quickly became a legend on the gridiron within the city of Miami, earning himself the nickname "Big 6".Thomas vowed to break the cycle of poverty in his family. Thomas attended Booker T. Washington High School in Miami, Florida. He was rated consensus five-star recruit coming out of high school and was ranked among the top prospects in his class. He committed to Florida State University to play college football on National Signing Day in 2013.

== College career ==
As a freshman at Florida State in 2013, Thomas played in four games before undergoing season-ending shoulder surgery. He received a medical redshirt and did not play in that season's National Championship Game. Due to failing a drug test at the National Championship Game, Thomas was suspended for the first six games of the 2014 season. After serving his suspension, he returned to game action against Notre Dame on October 18, 2014. He went on to tally 26 tackles and 2.5 tackles-for-loss on the season. He also played in that season's Rose Bowl, registering three solo tackles and one assisted tackle.

In 2015, Thomas was suspended for the entire season due to being academically ineligible. Thomas would bounce back in 2016 as the second leading tackler on the team. In that season's Orange Bowl, he made nine solo tackles and assisted on six tackles. In 2017, Thomas played in 11 of the team's 12 regular season games, and then decided not to play in the Independence Bowl. He later accepted an invitation to play in the 2018 East–West Shrine Game.

== Professional career ==
=== Pittsburgh Steelers ===
Thomas signed with the Pittsburgh Steelers as an undrafted free agent on April 28, 2018. He made the Steelers 53-man roster as an undrafted rookie, playing in 10 games before being waived on December 1, 2018 and re-signed to the practice squad.

=== Baltimore Ravens ===
On January 2, 2019, Thomas signed a reserve/future contract with the Baltimore Ravens. He was waived on August 1, 2019.

=== St. Louis BattleHawks ===
Thomas signed with the St. Louis BattleHawks of the XFL on January 8, 2020. He was waived during final roster cuts on January 22, 2020.

=== Saskatchewan Roughriders ===
Thomas signed with the Saskatchewan Roughriders of the CFL on April 14, 2020. After the CFL canceled the 2020 season due to the COVID-19 pandemic, Thomas chose to opt-out of his contract with the Roughriders on September 1, 2020. He opted back in to his contract on December 29, 2020.

=== Edmonton Elks ===
Thomas joined the Edmonton Elks in free agency on January 12, 2022. On June 2, 2023, Thomas was released by the Elks.
