= Cody O'Connell =

American football player (born 1994)

No. 76 – Washington State Cougars
- Position: Guard
- Class: Redshirt Senior

Personal information
- Born: November 25, 1994 (age 31); Wenatchee, Washington, U.S.
- Listed height: 6 ft 9 in (2.06 m)
- Listed weight: 352 lb (160 kg)

Career information
- High school: Wenatchee (WA)
- College: Washington State (2013–2017)

Awards and highlights
- 2× Consensus All-American (2016, 2017); First-team All-Pac-12 (2017)
- Stats at ESPN

Cody O'Connell (born November 25, 1994), nicknamed "the Continent", is an American former college football player who was a guard for the Washington State Cougars.

== College career ==
He earned consensus All-American honors as a junior in 2016, when he only received honorable mention for the all-conference team in the Pac-12. He was named first-team All-Pac-12 as a senior. He redshirted the 2013 season coming off a knee injury suffered during his senior year at Wenatchee, then failed to appear in a game the following year. After a year of duty on special teams, he got his chance to start in 2016. That year, he finished as an Outland Trophy finalist and unanimous All-American (the second in school history, with former NFL kicker Jason Hanson) and was named honorable mention All-Pac-12 Conference selection after playing in all 13 games, starting 12 for the cougars. In 2017, O'Connell was named first team All-Pac-12 as he started all 13 games at left guard. The Associated Press voted him second-team All-American, as well.

In May 2018, he attended rookie minicamp on a tryout basis with both the Kansas City Chiefs and Washington Redskins.
