= Freddie Stevenson (American football) =

American football player (born 1995)

No. 43
- Position: Fullback

Personal information
- Born: April 12, 1995 (age 31); Bartow, Florida
- Listed height: 6 ft 0 in (1.83 m)
- Listed weight: 241 lb (109 kg)

Career information
- High school: Bartow High School
- College: Florida State
- NFL draft: 2017: undrafted

Career history
- Chicago Bears (2017)*; Orlando Apollos (2019)
- * Offseason or practice squad member only

Awards and highlights
- BCS national champion (2013)
- Stats at Pro Football Reference

Freddie Stevenson (born April 4, 1995) is an American former football fullback. He played college football at Florida State, and signed with the Chicago Bears as an undrafted free agent in 2017, and also played for the Orlando Apollos.

== High school and college career ==
Stevenson played high school football at Bartow High School in Bartow, Florida, where he played linebacker.

In 2013, Stevenson appeared in games as a backup fullback.

By 2014, Stevenson would appear in all 14 games as a fullback starting in 7 of those games.

In 2015, Stevenson would start in 10 games and blocked for Dalvin Cook who had a record setting single-season performance for rushing yards (1,691) and all-purpose yards (1,935).

In his final season with the Seminoles, Stevenson would rush for 95 yards on 13 carries for 4 touchdowns.

== Professional career ==
Pre-draft measurables
Height	Weight	Arm length	Hand span	Wingspan	40-yard dash	10-yard split	20-yard split	20-yard shuttle	Three-cone drill	Vertical jump	Broad jump	Bench press
6 ft 0 1/2 in (1.84 m)	234 lb (106 kg)	32 3/4 in (0.83 m)	9 5/8 in (0.24 m)	6 ft 3 3/4 in (1.92 m)	4.70 s	1.68 s	2.75 s	4.44 s	7.10 s	30.5 in (0.77 m)	9 ft 4 in (2.84 m)	24 reps
All values from NFL Combine/Pro Day

=== Chicago Bears ===
Stevenson signed with the Chicago Bears as an undrafted free agent, following the 2017 NFL draft. On September 2, 2017, Stevenson was waived by the Bears.

=== Orlando Apollos ===
Stevenson signed with the Orlando Apollos in 2018 for the 2019 season.

== Post-playing career ==
In June 2019, Stevenson announced he had ended his football career, citing the NFL's decrease in using fullbacks, and created the Triumph 105 clothing line.
