= List of Senior CLASS Award football winners =

Senior CLASS Award for football
- Awarded for: the outstanding senior NCAA Division I FBS Student-Athlete of the Year in football
- Country: United States
- Presented by: Premier Sports Management

History
- First award: 2009
- Most recent: Pittsburgh quarterback Kenny Pickett
- Website: http://www.seniorclassaward.com/football/

The Senior CLASS Award is presented each year to the outstanding senior NCAA Division I Student-Athlete of the Year in football at the Football Bowl Subdivision (FBS) level. The award was established in 2009 after being successfully implemented with collegiate men's and women's basketball, baseball, softball, men's ice hockey, men's lacrosse, and men's and women's soccer. The inaugural winner was James Laurinaitis of Ohio State.

== Winners ==
Year	Winner	Pos.	Team	Ref.
2008	James Laurinaitis	LB	Ohio State	
2009	Tim Tebow	QB	Florida	
2010	Ricky Dobbs	QB	Navy	
2011	Kirk Cousins	QB	Michigan State	
2012	Manti Te'o	LB	Notre Dame	
2013	John Urschel	G	Penn State	
2014	Ameer Abdullah	RB	Nebraska	
2015	Dak Prescott	QB	Mississippi State	
2016	Jake Butt	TE	Michigan	
2017	Shaquem Griffin	LB	UCF	
2018	Will Grier	QB	West Virginia	
2019	Derrick Brown	DT	Auburn	
2020	Kekaula Kaniho	S	Boise State	
2021	Kenny Pickett	QB	Pittsburgh	
