= DeMarcus Walker =

American football player (born 1994)

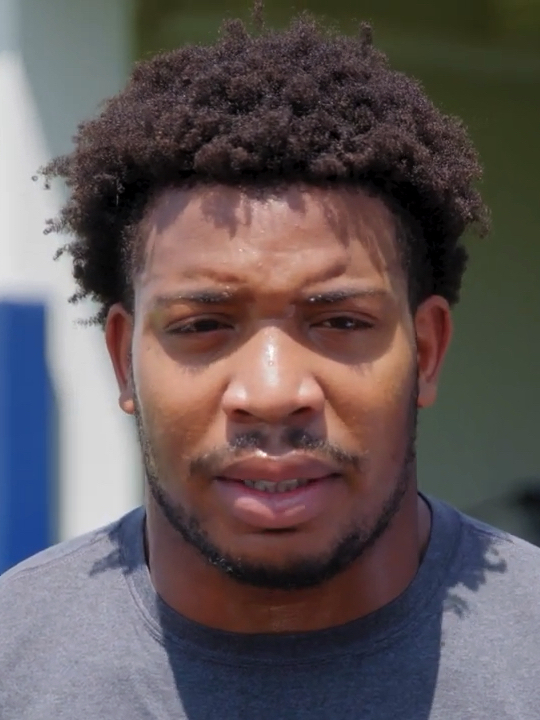
- Walker in 2022

Profile
- Position: Defensive end

Personal information
- Born: September 30, 1994 (age 32); Jacksonville, Florida, U.S.
- Listed height: 6 ft 4 in (1.93 m)
- Listed weight: 280 lb (127 kg)

Career information
- High school: Sandalwood (Jacksonville)
- College: Florida State (2013–2016)
- NFL draft: 2017: 2nd round, 51st overall pick

Career history
- Denver Broncos (2017–2020); Houston Texans (2021); Tennessee Titans (2022); Chicago Bears (2023–2024); Washington Commanders (2025)

Awards and highlights
- BCS national champion (2013); Consensus All-American (2016); ACC Co-Defensive Player of the Year (2016); First-team All-ACC (2016); Second-team All-ACC (2015)

Career NFL statistics as of 2025
- Total tackles: 193
- Sacks: 26.5
- Forced fumbles: 2
- Fumble recoveries: 1
- Pass deflections: 2
- Stats at Pro Football Reference

DeMarcus Walker (born September 30, 1994) is an American professional football defensive end. He played college football for the Florida State Seminoles and was selected by the Denver Broncos in the second round of the 2017 NFL draft. Walker has also played for the Houston Texans, Tennessee Titans, and Chicago Bears.

== Early life ==
Walker attended Sandalwood High School in Jacksonville, Florida. He originally committed to the University of Alabama to play college football but changed to Florida State University.

== College career ==
As a true freshman at Florida State in 2013, Walker played in 12 games and made three starts. He finished the year with 18 tackles and one sack. As a sophomore in 2014 he played in all 14 games with 11 starts, recording 38 tackles and one sack. As a junior in 2015, Walker started all 13 games, recording 58 tackles and 10.5 sacks. During the first game of his senior season in 2016, he recorded 4.5 sacks. On October 8, 2016, he sealed FSU's 7th win in a row against in-state rival Miami by blocking Miami's game tying PAT, known now as the "Block at the Rock".

== Professional career ==
Walker received an invitation to the NFL Combine, but chose to only perform the bench and produced 18 reps. He participated at Florida State's Pro Day and completed all the combine drills. Walker said he didn't perform them at the combine because he wanted to have more time to get into better shape. He was projected to be a second or third round pick by the majority of draft experts and analysts. Walker was ranked the 10th best defensive end by NFLDraftScout.com, the 15th best defensive end by Sports Illustrated, and ranked the 11th best defensive end in the draft by ESPN.

Pre-draft measurables
Height	Weight	Arm length	Hand span	Wingspan	40-yard dash	10-yard split	20-yard split	20-yard shuttle	Three-cone drill	Vertical jump	Broad jump	Bench press
6 ft 3 5/8 in (1.92 m)	280 lb (127 kg)	33 in (0.84 m)	10 1/2 in (0.27 m)	6 ft 7 5/8 in (2.02 m)	4.88 s	1.71 s	2.85 s	4.71 s	7.91 s	31.5 in (0.80 m)	9 ft 7 in (2.92 m)	20 reps
All values from NFL Combine/Florida State's Pro Day

=== Denver Broncos ===
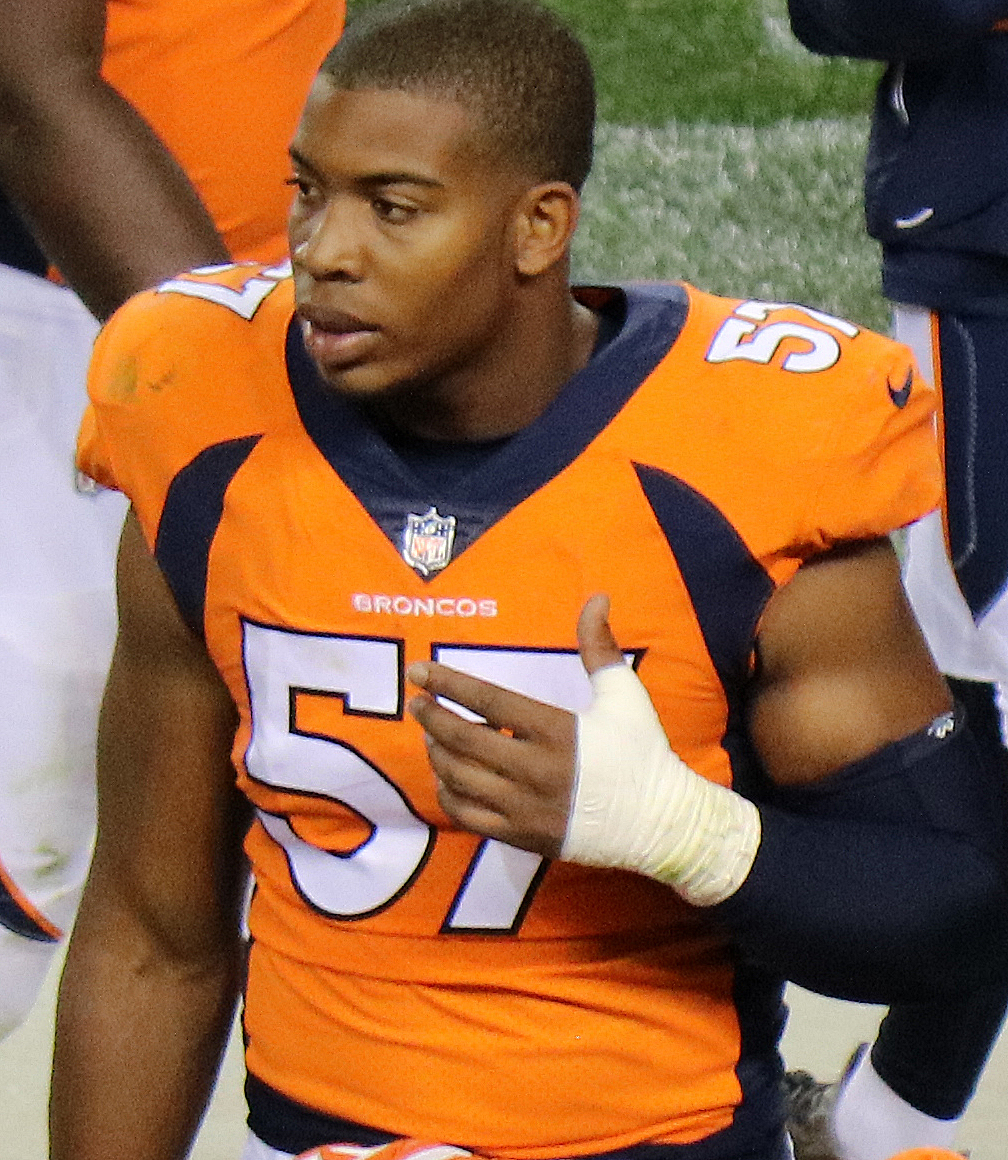
Walker with the Denver Broncos in 2017

The Denver Broncos selected Walker in the second round (51st overall) of the 2017 NFL draft. On May 15, 2017, the Broncos signed Walker to a four-year, $5.07 million contract with $2.52 million guaranteed and a signing bonus of $1.83 million.

On September 23, 2020, Walker was placed on injured reserve with a calf injury. He was activated on October 24.

=== Houston Texans ===
Walker signed with the Houston Texans on April 16, 2021. He was placed on injured reserve on December 4. Walker was activated on December 25.

=== Tennessee Titans ===
On May 16, 2022, Walker signed with the Tennessee Titans. In 2022, Walker played 17 games while starting in 6 of them record 32 tackles, 10 tackles for a loss, and 7 sacks.

=== Chicago Bears ===
On March 15, 2023, Walker signed a three-year, $21 million contract with the Chicago Bears. In two seasons with the Bears, Walker started 29 games and had 7 sacks. On February 21, 2025, Walker was released by the Bears.

=== Washington Commanders ===
The Washington Commanders signed Walker to their practice squad on November 11, 2025.
