= Marquez White =

American football player (born 1994)

No. 39, 27
- Position: Cornerback

Personal information
- Born: October 29, 1994 (age 32); Dothan, Alabama, U.S.
- Listed height: 6 ft 0 in (1.83 m)
- Listed weight: 190 lb (86 kg)

Career information
- High school: Northview (Dothan, Alabama)
- College: Florida State
- NFL draft: 2017: 6th round, 216th overall pick

Career history
- Dallas Cowboys (2017–2018)*; Orlando Apollos (2019); St. Louis BattleHawks (2020)
- * Offseason or practice squad member only
- Stats at Pro Football Reference

Marquez White (born October 29, 1994) is an American former football cornerback. He played college football and basketball at Florida State University. He was a member of the Dallas Cowboys of the National Football League (NFL), the Orlando Apollos of the Alliance of American Football (AAF), and the St. Louis BattleHawks of the XFL.

== Early life ==
White attended Northview High School in Dothan, Alabama. As a freshman, he played at wide receiver. As a sophomore, he was moved to cornerback.

As a senior, he posted 39 tackles, 3 interceptions, 9 passes defended, one forced a fumble, one fumble recovery and scored four touchdowns via receptions and returns. He also had a 98-yard touchdown reception.

In basketball, he averaged 19.3 points, 10.3 rebounds and 4.5 assists per game.

== College career ==
White accepted a football scholarship from Florida State University. As a true freshman, he was moved to wide receiver to provide depth for part of the season, but still managed to have 12 tackles and one interception.

In his first 2 years he was a backup and played mainly on special teams. As a junior, he took advantage of players that left for the NFL and became a starter at cornerback in 13 games opposite of future All-Pro Jalen Ramsey, allowing just 20 receptions and one touchdown, while making 25 tackles (2 for loss), one interception and 2 passes defensed.

He started 13 games as a senior, allowing just 22 receptions and one touchdown, while posting 25 tackles (2 for loss), 2 interceptions and 6 passes defensed.

As a freshman, he was a backup guard for six games in the 2013-2014 basketball season, but opted to concentrate in football.

== Professional career ==
Pre-draft measurables
Height	Weight	Arm length	Hand span	Wingspan	40-yard dash	10-yard split	20-yard split	20-yard shuttle	Three-cone drill	Vertical jump	Broad jump
5 ft 11 3/4 in (1.82 m)	194 lb (88 kg)	32 1/8 in (0.82 m)	10 in (0.25 m)	6 ft 5 3/8 in (1.97 m)	4.59 s	1.59 s	2.70 s	4.36 s	7.28 s	36.0 in (0.91 m)	10 ft 3 in (3.12 m)
All values from NFL Combine/Pro Day

=== Dallas Cowboys ===
White was selected by the Dallas Cowboys in the sixth round (216th overall) of the 2017 NFL draft. On September 2, he was waived after the team traded for veteran cornerback Bene Benwikere. On September 3, he was signed to the Cowboys' practice squad.

He signed a reserve/future contract with the Cowboys on January 1, 2018. He was waived on September 1.

=== Orlando Apollos ===
In 2019, White joined the Orlando Apollos of the Alliance of American Football. He was a starter until the league folded in April 2019. He finished with 8 starts at left cornerback, 21 tackles and 7 passes defensed.

=== St. Louis BattleHawks ===
In October 2019, he was selected by the St. Louis BattleHawks of the XFL in the 6th round during phase four of the 2020 XFL draft. On January 21, he was placed on injured reserve before the start of the season. On February 24, he was activated from injured reserve. In March, amid the COVID-19 pandemic, the league announced that it would be cancelling the rest of the season. He had his contract terminated when the league suspended operations on April 10, 2020. He played in 2 games as a backup cornerback and had 2 tackles.

== Personal life ==
In 2018, he was charged with second-degree aggravated assault with a deadly weapon in response to a road-rage incident. The charges were dropped and the NFL didn't issue any disciplinary action. After football, he started a food truck business.
