= 2016 Orange Bowl =

2016 Capital One Orange Bowl
- CFP New Year’s Six; 83rd Orange Bowl
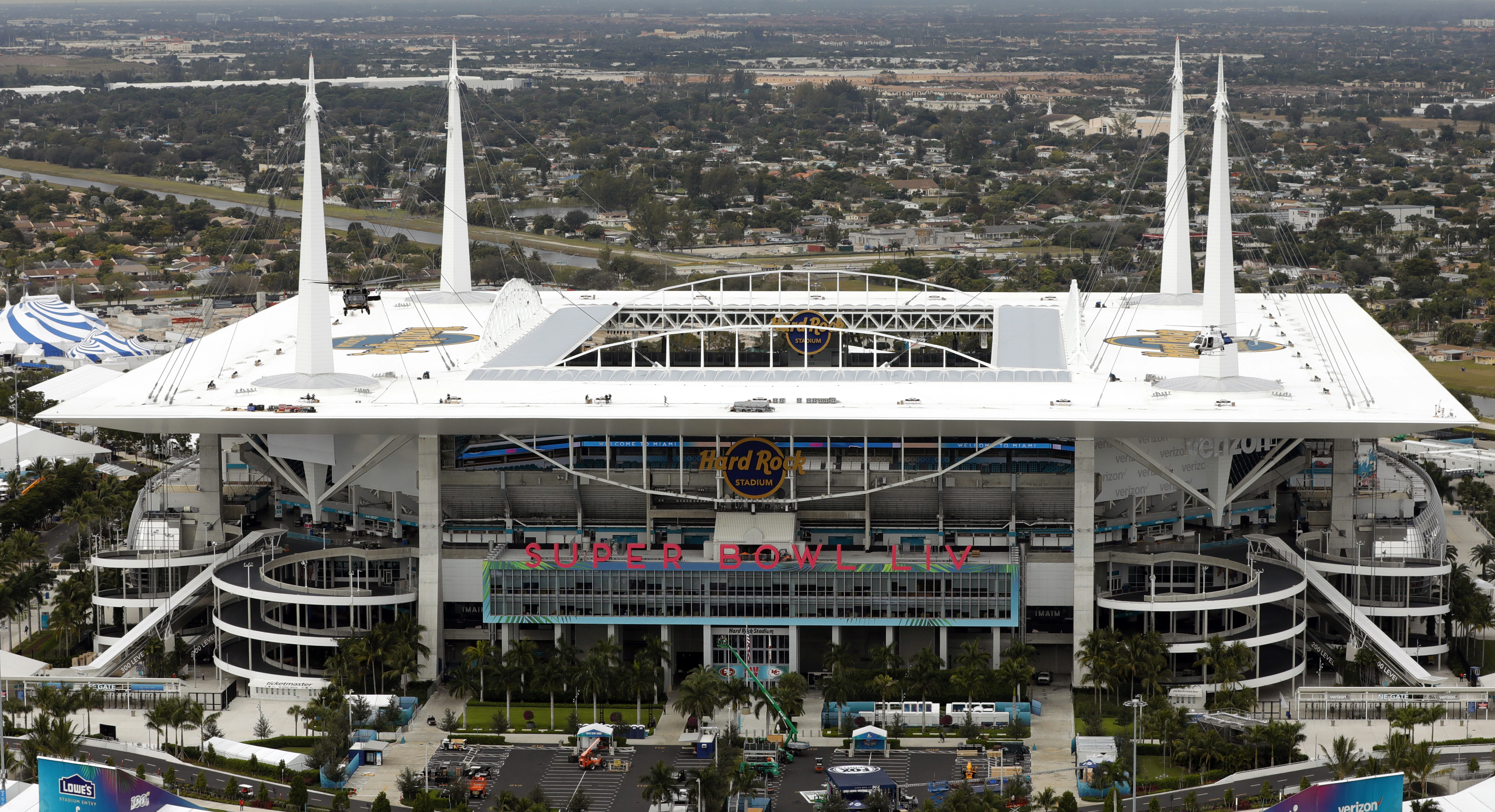
- Hard Rock Stadium in Miami Gardens, Florida, hosted the Orange Bowl.
Michigan Wolverines	Florida State Seminoles
(10–2)	(9–3)
Big Ten	ACC
32	33
Head coach: Jim Harbaugh	Head coach: Jimbo Fisher
AP / Coaches / CFP; 6 / 6 / 6	AP / Coaches / CFP; 10 / 10 / 11
	1	2	3	4	Total
Michigan	3	3	9	17	32
Florida State	17	3	0	13	33
- Date: December 30, 2016
- Season: 2016
- Stadium: Hard Rock Stadium
- Location: Miami Gardens, Florida
- MVP: Dalvin Cook; RB, Florida State
- Favorite: Michigan by 7 (50.5)
- National anthem: Maddie & Tae
- Referee: Matt Austin (SEC)
- Halftime show: DNCE
- Attendance: 67,432

United States TV coverage
- Network: ESPN
- Announcers: Steve Levy, Brian Griese and Todd McShay (ESPN)

The 2016 Orange Bowl was a college football bowl game played on December 30, 2016 at Hard Rock Stadium in Miami Gardens, Florida, played between the Michigan Wolverines of the Big Ten Conference against the Florida State Seminoles of the Atlantic Coast Conference (ACC). It was one of the 2016–17 bowl games that concluded the 2016 NCAA Division I FBS football season. Florida State won the game by a score of 33–32. Dalvin Cook, running back for the Seminoles, was named the game's MVP.

The game was played on the 30th instead of on December 31 or January 1, as the following day's College Football Playoff semi-final bowls were played with earlier kick-off times that intruded into the New Year's Six early-afternoon scheduling window.

== Teams ==
This Orange Bowl game featured the Michigan Wolverines and the Florida State Seminoles.

This was the third meeting between the two schools, with the all time series tied at 1–1; the most recent previous meeting was in 1991, when the Seminoles defeated the Wolverines by a score of 51–31 in Ann Arbor, Michigan. The other meeting occurred in 1986 when the Wolverines defeated the Seminoles by a score of 20–18, a game also played in Ann Arbor.

=== Michigan Wolverines ===
After finishing their regular season with a 10–2 record, the Wolverines were selected to their third Orange Bowl appearance. This was their 45th bowl game appearance, the 11th-highest total all-time among FBS schools.

=== Florida State Seminoles ===
After finishing their regular season with a 9–3 record, the Seminoles were selected to their 10th Orange Bowl appearance, the third most Orange Bowl appearances by any team. This will be their 46th bowl game appearance.

== Game summary ==
=== Scoring summary ===
Scoring summary

Quarter	Time	Drive			Team	Scoring information	Score	
Quarter	Time	Plays	Yards	TOP	Team	Scoring information	MICH	FSU
1	12:47	6	75	2:13	FSU	Dalvin Cook 2-yard touchdown run, Ricky Aguayo kick good	0	7
1	9:11	4	0	1:31	MICH	19-yard field goal by Kenny Allen	3	7
1	7:31	5	50	1:40	FSU	42-yard field goal by Ricky Aguayo	3	10
1	2:49	1	92	0:14	FSU	Nyquan Murray 92-yard touchdown reception from Deondre Francois, Ricky Aguayo kick good	3	17
2	9:36	11	59	4:30	MICH	28-yard field goal by Kenny Allen	6	17
2	4:49	15	54	4:47	FSU	38-yard field goal by Ricky Aguayo	6	20
3	7:34	14	46	7:26	MICH	37-yard field goal by Kenny Allen	9	20
3	0:54				MICH	Interception returned 14 yards for touchdown by Mike McCray, 2-point pass incomplete	15	20
4	11:38	7	75	4:16	FSU	Deondre Francois 3-yard touchdown run, Ricky Aguayo kick good	15	27
4	5:22	7	37	2:36	MICH	Khalid Hill 8-yard touchdown reception from Wilton Speight, Kenny Allen kick good	22	27
4	1:57	5	61	2:17	MICH	Chris Evans 30-yard touchdown run, 2-point pass good	30	27
4	0:36	4	34	1:21	FSU	Nyquan Murray 12-yard touchdown reception from Deondre Francois, Ricky Aguayo kick no good	30	33
4	0:36				MICH	Ricky Aguayo kick blocked; Josh Metellus return for 2 points	32	33
"TOP" = time of possession. For other American football terms, see Glossary of American football.							32	33

=== Statistics ===
Statistics	Michigan	Florida State
First downs	16	15
Plays-yards	74-252	62-371
Third down efficiency	7-20	3-13
Rushes-yards	36-89	35-149
Passing yards	163	222
Passing, Comp-Att-Int	21-38-1	9-27-1
Time of Possession	34:17	25:43

Team	Category	Player	Statistics
Michigan	Passing	Wilton Speight	21/38, 163 yds, 1 TD, 1 INT
Michigan	Rushing	Chris Evans	8 car, 49 yds, 1 TD
Michigan	Receiving	Ian Bunting	3 rec, 40 yds
Florida State	Passing	Deondre Francois	9/27, 222 yds, 2 TD, 1 INT
Florida State	Rushing	Dalvin Cook	20 car, 145 yds, 1 TD
Florida State	Receiving	Nyquan Murray	2 rec, 104 yds
