= Roderick Johnson =

American football player (born 1995)

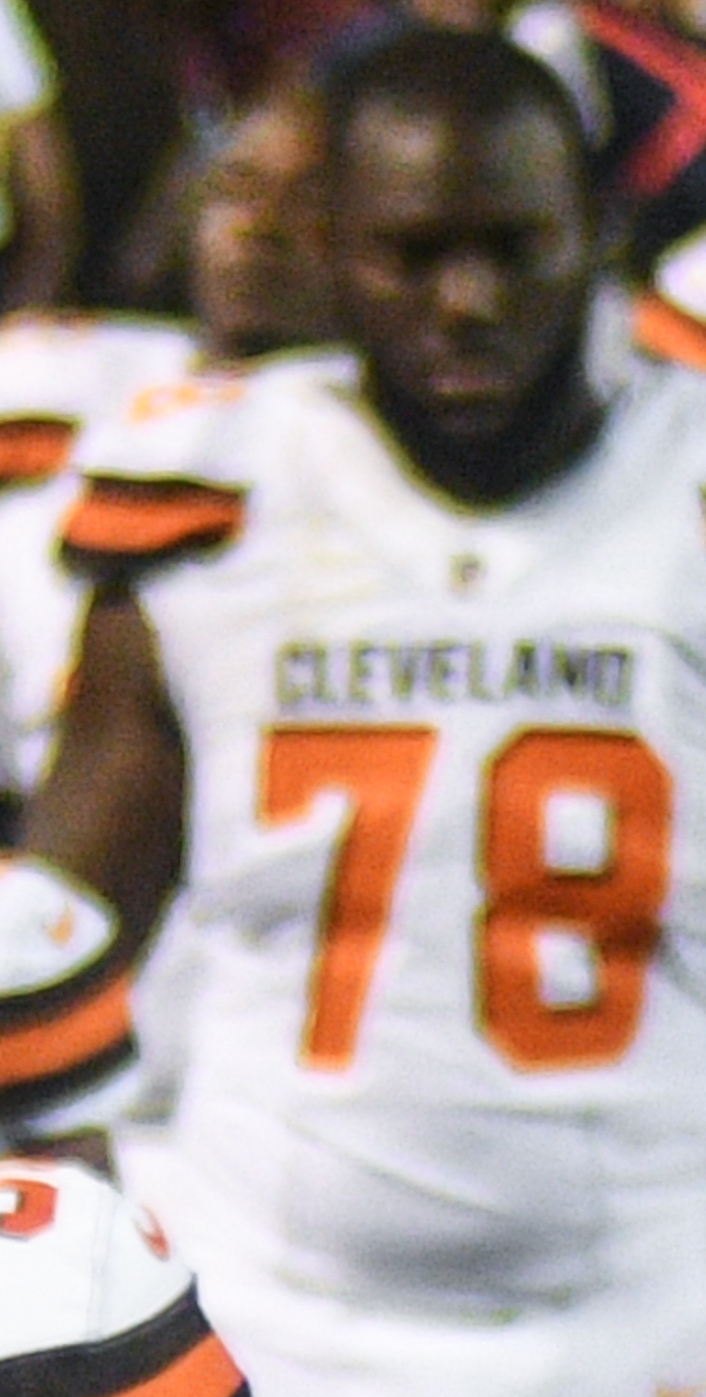
- Johnson with the Cleveland Browns in 2017

No. 63
- Position: Offensive tackle

Personal information
- Born: November 28, 1995 (age 30); St. Louis, Missouri, U.S.
- Listed height: 6 ft 7 in (2.01 m)
- Listed weight: 301 lb (137 kg)

Career information
- High school: Hazelwood Central (Florissant, Missouri)
- College: Florida State (2014–2016)
- NFL draft: 2017: 5th round, 160th overall pick

Career history
- Cleveland Browns (2017); Houston Texans (2018–2020); Miami Dolphins (2021); Kansas City Chiefs (2021–2022)*; Philadelphia Eagles (2022–2023)
- * Offseason or practice squad member only

Awards and highlights
- First-team All-American (2016); 2× First-team All-ACC (2015, 2016); Jacobs Blocking Trophy (2015)

Career NFL statistics
- Games played: 29
- Games started: 6
- Stats at Pro Football Reference

Roderick Tyler Johnson (born November 28, 1995) is an American former professional football player who was an offensive tackle in the National Football League (NFL). He played college football for the Florida State Seminoles, and was selected by the Cleveland Browns in the fifth round of 2017 NFL draft.

== Early life ==
Johnson attended Hazelwood Central High School in Florissant, Missouri, where he played high school football. He was rated as a four-star recruit and was considered among the top offensive tackles in his class. He committed to Florida State University to play college football.

== College career ==
Johnson entered his true freshman year at Florida State in 2014 as a backup, but moved into the starting lineup for the final five games. He started every game at left tackle for Florida State as a sophomore in 2015 and was the winner of the Jacobs Blocking Trophy.

== Professional career ==
Pre-draft measurables
Height	Weight	Arm length	Hand span	Wingspan	40-yard dash	10-yard split	20-yard split	20-yard shuttle	Three-cone drill	Vertical jump	Broad jump	Bench press
6 ft 6 3/4 in (2.00 m)	298 lb (135 kg)	36 in (0.91 m)	10 3/4 in (0.27 m)	7 ft 2 3/8 in (2.19 m)	4.90 s	1.75 s	2.89 s	4.94 s	7.92 s	29.5 in (0.75 m)	8 ft 7 in (2.62 m)	21 reps
All values from NFL Combine/Pro Day

=== Cleveland Browns ===
Johnson was selected by the Cleveland Browns in the fifth round, 160th overall, in the 2017 NFL draft. He signed a four-year contract with the Browns on May 10, 2017. On September 4, Johnson was placed on injured reserve.

Johnson was waived by the Browns on June 19, 2018, without ever appearing in a game for the Browns.

=== Houston Texans ===
On June 20, 2018, Johnson was claimed off waivers by the Houston Texans. He was waived on September 1, and was re-signed to the team's practice squad the next day. Johnson was promoted to the active roster on September 12. He was waived on October 4, and was re-signed to the practice squad. Johnson was promoted back to the active roster on December 8.

In 2019, Johnson played in all 16 games, starting three games, two at right tackle and one at left tackle.

Johnson re-signed with the Texans on a one-year contract on March 21, 2020. He re-signed with the team again on April 9, 2021. Johnson was released by the Texans on August 18.

=== Miami Dolphins ===
On September 20, 2021, Johnson was signed to the Miami Dolphins' practice squad.

=== Kansas City Chiefs ===
On January 19, 2022, Johnson was signed to the Kansas City Chiefs' practice squad. He signed a reserve/future contract with the Chiefs on February 2. Johnson was released by Kansas City on August 27.

=== Philadelphia Eagles ===
Johnson was signed to the practice squad of the Philadelphia Eagles on September 28, 2022. On February 15, 2023, Johnson signed a reserve/future contract with the Eagles. He was placed on injured reserve on August 27.
