= Dalvin Cook =

American football player (born 1995)

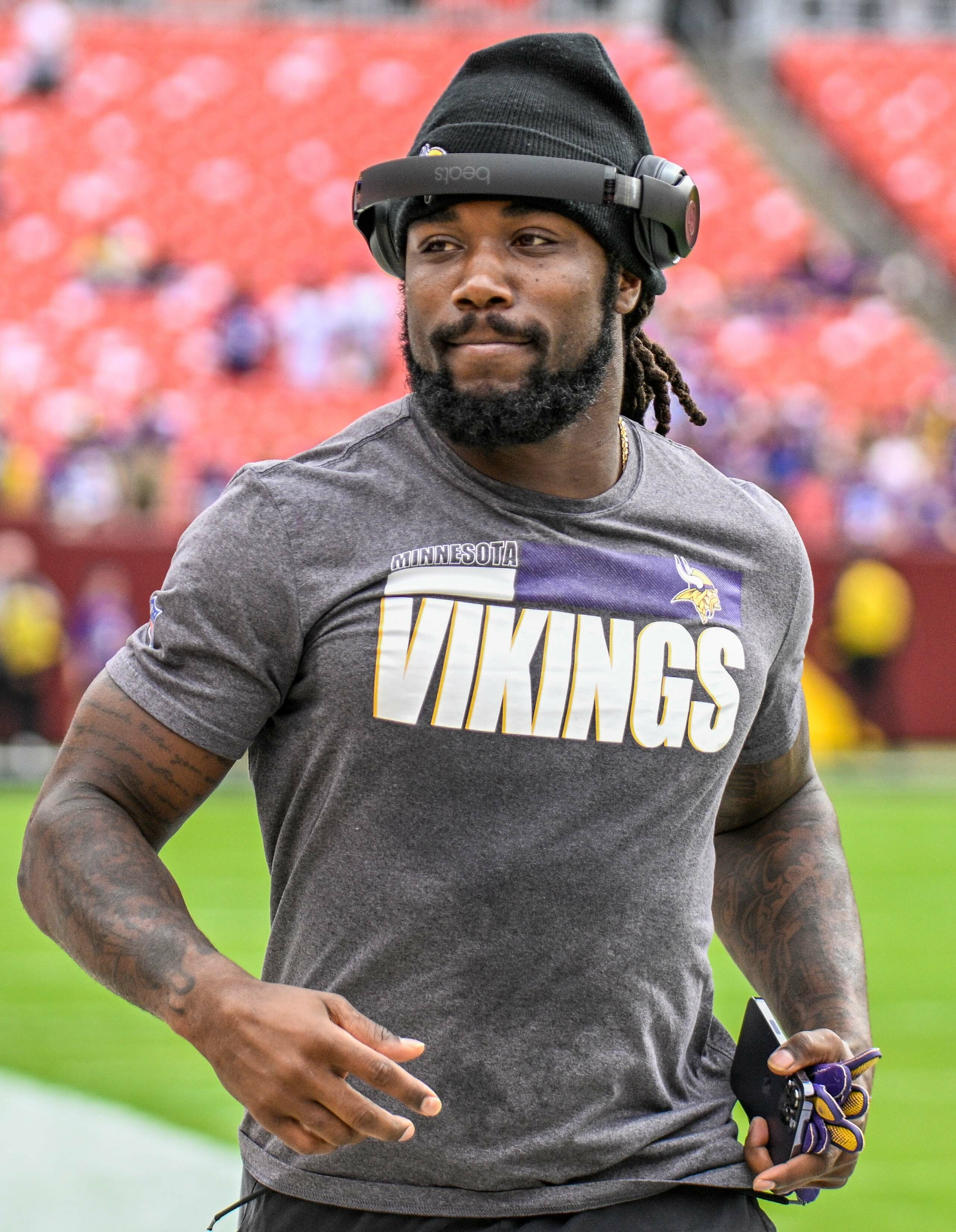
- Cook with the Minnesota Vikings in 2022

Profile
- Position: Running back

Personal information
- Born: August 10, 1995 (age 31); Opa-locka, Florida, U.S.
- Listed height: 5 ft 10 in (1.78 m)
- Listed weight: 210 lb (95 kg)

Career information
- High school: Miami Central (West Little River, Florida)
- College: Florida State (2014–2016)
- NFL draft: 2017: 2nd round, 41st overall pick

Career history
- Minnesota Vikings (2017–2022); New York Jets (2023); Baltimore Ravens (2023); Dallas Cowboys (2024)

Awards and highlights
- 4× Pro Bowl (2019–2022); Jim Brown Trophy (2015); Unanimous All-American (2016); First-team All-American (2015); 2× First-team All-ACC (2015, 2016); Second-team All-ACC (2014)

Career NFL statistics
- Rushing yards: 6,227
- Rushing average: 4.6
- Rushing touchdowns: 47
- Receptions: 237
- Receiving yards: 1,882
- Receiving touchdowns: 5
- Stats at Pro Football Reference

Dalvin James Cook (born August 10, 1995) is an American professional football running back. He played college football for the Florida State Seminoles, earning unanimous All-American honors and finishing his career as the school's all-time leading rusher. Cook was selected by the Minnesota Vikings in the second round of the 2017 NFL draft, and in six seasons with the team, he earned Pro Bowl honors four times. He is the older brother of Buffalo Bills running back James Cook.

== Early life ==
Born in Opa-locka, Florida, Cook attended Miami Central High School, the same as former Seminole running back Devonta Freeman. His brother is former basketball player DeAndre Burnett. Cook did not join the football program until his sophomore year, figuring he had no chance to supplant senior running back Devonta Freeman, who led Central to a Class 6A state title in 2010. Cook played as a running back and defensive back under coach Telly Lockette. In his junior year, he shared carries with Joseph Yearby, who is his best friend. On running downs, Yearby played wildcat quarterback and Cook lined up at running back. As a senior in 2013, Cook rushed for a county-best 1,940 yards and 34 touchdowns on 177 carries (11.0 yards per rush) and intercepted three passes on defense. In Central's Class 6A regional final win against Palm Bay Heritage, Cook ran for 244 yards and three touchdowns as Yearby fractured his fibula in the first quarter of the game. From that point on, Cook led his team to the Class 6A state championship by rushing for 223 yards and four touchdowns in a 52–7 win over Seffner Armwood, helping the Rockets win their third state championship in the past four seasons and become the first Dade team to advance to four consecutive state finals. For his season efforts, Cook was named Mr. Florida Football by the Florida Dairy Farmers Association, becoming the third recipient of the award since its inception (back in 1992) from Miami-Dade County, joining former Miami Northwestern quarterback Jacory Harris and former Miami Norland running back Duke Johnson.

Cook finished his prep career with 4,267 rushing yards and 64 touchdowns, while leading Miami Central to a 52–5 record. His senior season accolades included USA Today All-USA Football Team, 247Sports Second-team All-American and All-State Class 6A first-team. Following his senior season, Cook was invited to play at the 2014 Under Armour All-America Game, where he rushed for 78 yards and a touchdown on just eight carries for Team Nitro. Cook also participated in "The Opening", an all-star summer prospect camp held on the Nike Campus.

In track & field, Cook was one of the state's top sprinters. He recorded a personal-best time of 22.10 seconds in the 200-meter dash at the 2013 Sam Burley Invitational, where he placed 13th. At the 2013 FHSAA 3A Region 4, he ran the third leg on the Miami Central 4 × 100 m relay and 4 × 400 m relay squads, helping them win both events with times of 41.15 seconds and 3:17.58 minutes, respectively. In the preliminary rounds of the 2013 GMAC North Qualifier, he was clocked at 10.08 seconds (heavily wind-aided) in the 100-meter dash, but would later run a 10.92 to earn a fifth-place finish in the finals.

Regarded as a five-star recruit by Rivals.com, Cook was ranked as the second best all-purpose back in his class. Before he signed with Florida State in January 2014, he had already taken the summer and night classes necessary to graduate high school early and enroll in the spring. Cook originally committed to Clemson University, then flipped to the University of Florida under coach Will Muschamp in the spring of 2013. However, after Florida's 4–8 season that year, the 5-star running back began wavering on his pledge—privately. Despite officially visiting other schools, Cook claimed he was "100 percent" committed to the University of Florida in every interview. During the week of the Under Armour All-America Game, he did the Gator Chomp on social media and posed for a pictures with Florida commits after one of the practices. On January 1, 2014, Cook flipped to Florida State University.

== College career ==
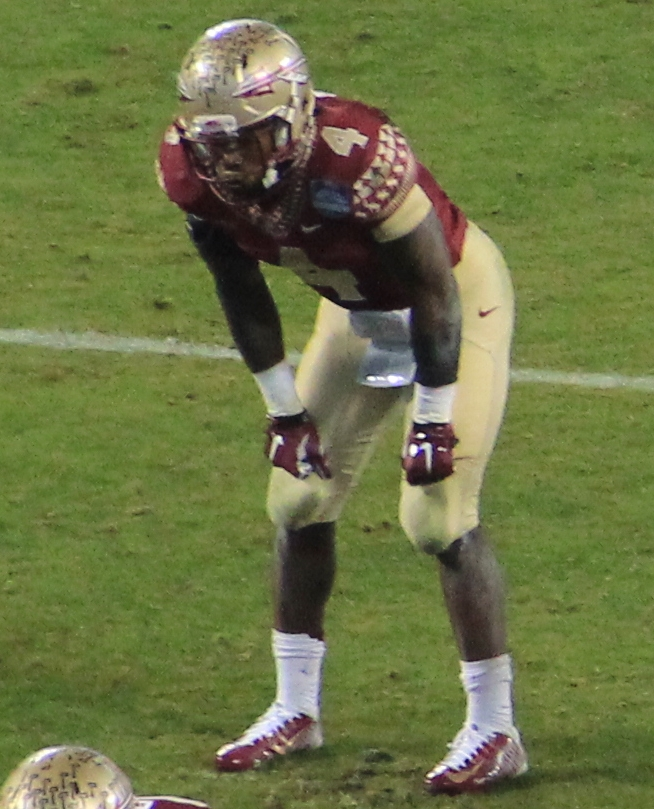
Cook with the Seminoles in 2014

Cook attended and played college football at Florida State from 2014 to 2016 under head coach Jimbo Fisher.

Cook split carries with Karlos Williams and Mario Pender as a true freshman in 2014. In his first game against The Citadel, he rushed 67 yards with one touchdown. He rushed for 100 yards for the first time in his college career against Syracuse, gaining 122 yards over 23 carries with a touchdown. Cook was named the MVP of the 2014 ACC Championship Game against Georgia Tech after earning a career-high 177 yards on 31 carries and one rushing touchdown. Overall, in the 2014 season, he finished with 1,008 rushing yards, eight rushing touchdowns, 22 receptions, and 203 receiving yards.

In July 2015, Cook was suspended after he was charged with battery following an incident outside a bar. The following month, he was found not guilty and reinstated by Florida State. He started the season off strong with 156 rushing yards and a rushing touchdown against Texas State. In the next game, against South Florida, he had 266 rushing yards and three rushing touchdowns. On October 10, against the Miami Hurricanes, he had 222 rushing yards and two rushing touchdowns to go along with 47 receiving yards and a receiving touchdown to help the Seminoles to a 5–0 record. During the team's tenth game, which was against NC State, Cook broke Warrick Dunn's Florida State single-season rushing yards record of 1,242. In the annual rivalry game against the Florida Gators, he had 183 rushing yards and two rushing touchdowns. Overall, he finished the 2015 season with 1,691 rushing yards, 19 rushing touchdowns, 24 receptions, 244 receiving yards, and one receiving touchdown.

Cook started the 2016 season with 91 rushing yards and 101 receiving yards in a victory over Ole Miss. On September 24, against South Florida, he had 267 rushing yards and two rushing touchdowns to go along with 62 receiving yards. In the next game, against North Carolina, he had 140 rushing yards and three rushing touchdowns to go along with six receptions for 106 yards. On November 19, 2016, during the first quarter of the team's game against the Syracuse Orange, Cook broke Warrick Dunn's career rushing record of 3,959 yards. Cook entered the game just 18 yards behind the record and finished with 225 rushing yards and four rushing touchdowns. He finished his career with 4,464 rushing yards. A few hours after winning the Orange Bowl against Michigan, Cook announced he would forgo his senior season at Florida State in order to enter the 2017 NFL draft.

== Professional career ==
Cook received an invitation to the NFL Combine and completed all of the required combine drills and positional drills. He participated at Florida State's Pro Day and ran the 40-yard dash, 20-yard dash, 10-yard dash, and positional drills. He was ranked the top running back in the draft by Sports Illustrated and Pro Football Focus, the second best running back by NFL media analyst Bucky Brooks, and the third best running back by NFLDraftScout.com and NFL analyst Mike Mayock. Although he was considered to be one of the top running backs, off-the-field problems, prior arrests, character concerns, fumbling issues, and a history of shoulder injuries caused his stock to fall. NFL draft experts and analysts projected Cook to be selected in the first or second round of the draft.

External videos
- Cook performing at the NFL Combine
- Cook gets drafted by Minnesota

Pre-draft measurables
Height	Weight	Arm length	Hand span	Wingspan	40-yard dash	10-yard split	20-yard split	20-yard shuttle	Three-cone drill	Vertical jump	Broad jump	Bench press	Wonderlic
5 ft 10 3/8 in (1.79 m)	210 lb (95 kg)	32 3/8 in (0.82 m)	9 1/4 in (0.23 m)	6 ft 3 1/8 in (1.91 m)	4.49 s	1.56 s	2.63 s	4.53 s	7.27 s	30.5 in (0.77 m)	9 ft 8 in (2.95 m)	22 reps	11
All values from NFL Combine

=== Minnesota Vikings ===
==== 2017 season ====
The Minnesota Vikings selected Cook in the second round (41st overall) of the 2017 NFL draft. The Cincinnati Bengals traded the 41st overall pick to the Vikings for their second round draft selection (No. 48) and their fourth-round selection (No. 128). He was the third running back taken in the draft behind Leonard Fournette (fourth overall) and Christian McCaffrey (eighth overall).

In his first NFL game against the New Orleans Saints, Cook set the Vikings' rookie debut rushing record, previously held by Adrian Peterson, by rushing for 127 yards on 22 carries. In Week 3, against the Tampa Bay Buccaneers, he had 27 carries for 97 yards and a touchdown to go along with five receptions for 72 yards. During Week 4 against the Detroit Lions, Cook left the game with an apparent knee injury. The next day, it was revealed that Cook suffered a torn ACL, and it prematurely ended his rookie season. He was officially placed on injured reserve on October 5, 2017. In four games in his rookie year, Cook finished with 354 rushing yards. On October 9, 2017, Cook underwent successful repair of the left ACL. Orthopaedic surgeon Dr. James Andrews noted no further damage of the left knee with "100 percent" chance of return for the 2018 season.

==== 2018 season ====
In the season opener, his first game back from injury, Cook had 95 scrimmage yards in the 24–16 victory over the San Francisco 49ers. Cook suffered a hamstring injury in Week 2 and, after playing through it in Week 4 with 10 carries, missed the Vikings' next four games. After 89 yards in his Week 9 return, he had only limited success in the next 3 weeks. In a Week 13 loss to the New England Patriots, he had 84 rushing yards (32 on one play) and 8 receptions. In Week 15, Cook rushed for 136 yards and his only two rushing touchdowns in a 41–17 win over the Miami Dolphins, earning him NFC Offensive Player of the Week.

Cook finished the 2018 season with 615 rushing yards, gaining more than his backup Latavius Murray despite having fewer carries, and two touchdowns. He also caught 40 receptions for 305 yards and two touchdowns.

==== 2019 season ====
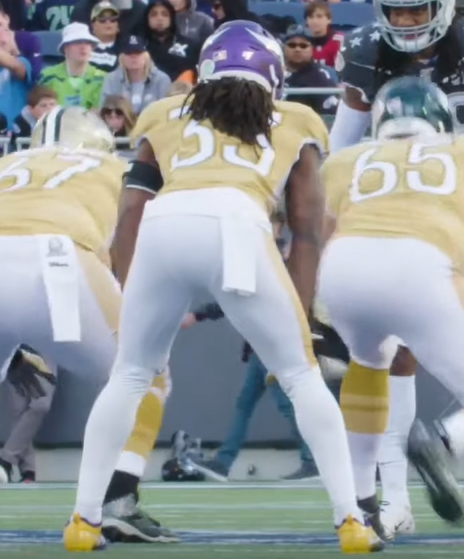
Cook at the 2020 Pro Bowl

In the season-opener against the Atlanta Falcons, Cook rushed 21 times for 111 yards and two touchdowns as the Vikings won 28–12. During Week 2 against the Green Bay Packers, Cook rushed for 154 yards, which included a 75-yard touchdown run as the Vikings lost 16–21. With that performance, he took the league lead in rushing yards, and was either first or second to Christian McCaffrey until Week 12. In Week 3 against the Oakland Raiders, Cook rushed 16 times for 110 yards and one touchdown and caught four passes for 33 yards as the Vikings won 34–14. During Week 5 against the New York Giants, Cook finished with 132 rushing yards along with 86 receiving yards, bringing it to 218 total yards as the Vikings won 28–10. During Week 7 against the Lions, Cook finished with 142 rushing yards and two touchdowns as the Vikings won 42–30, recapturing the league lead in rushing from McCaffrey. In the next game against the Washington Redskins, Cook rushed 23 times for 98 yards and a touchdown and caught five passes for 73 yards in the 19–9 win. During Week 10 against the Cowboys, Cook rushed 26 times for 97 yards and a touchdown and caught seven passes for 86 yards in the 28–24 road victory. He was named the NFC Offensive Player of the Week for his performance. However, Cook suffered a chest injury and would have only 117 rushing yards over the next four weeks (including a Week 12 bye), though he did have one touchdown in each of his three games of limited action over that time period. Cook was forced to miss the Vikings' Week 16 game against the Packers due to his chest injury. Without Cook, the Vikings lost 23–10. In the 2019 season, Cook finished with 1,135 rushing yards and 13 rushing touchdowns to go along with 53 receptions for 519 receiving yards in 14 games.

In the Wild Card Round against the Saints, Cook rushed 28 times for 94 yards and two touchdowns and caught three passes for 36 yards during the 26–20 overtime win. In the Divisional Round against the 49ers, Cook was ineffective, only rushing nine times for 18 yards as the Vikings lost 27–10. He was ranked 21st by his fellow players on the NFL Top 100 Players of 2020.

==== 2020 season ====
On June 8, 2020, Cook revealed his intent to forgo participation in team-related activities until a "reasonable extension" is agreed upon. On September 12, 2020, Cook signed a five-year, $63 million contract extension with the Vikings.

Cook scored his first two rushing touchdowns of the season in Week 1 of the 2020 season a 43–34 loss to the Packers. During Week 3 against the Tennessee Titans, Cook finished with a career-high 181 rushing yards and a touchdown as the Vikings lost 30–31. In the following game, he had 27 carries for 130 rushing yards and two rushing touchdowns in the 31–23 victory over the Houston Texans. In Week 5 against the Seattle Seahawks, Cook recorded 89 yards from scrimmage and a rushing touchdown before leaving the game due to an adductor strain. Without Cook, the Vikings lost the game 27–26. During Week 8 against the Packers, Cook finished with 163 rushing yards, 63 receiving yards, and four total touchdowns as the Vikings won 28–22. He became the first Vikings player to score four times in a single game since Ahmad Rashad did so against the 49ers on September 2, 1979. On November 4, 2020, Cook was named the NFC Offensive Player of the Week for his performance in Week 8. In Week 9, Cook rushed for a career-high 206 yards on 22 carries and had two rushing touchdowns in the 34–20 victory over the Lions. He became only the third player in Vikings franchise history to record 200 rushing yards in a single game, joining Adrian Peterson and Chuck Foreman. Cook was named the NFC Offensive Player of the Week for his performance in Week 9. In Week 11 against the Cowboys, Cook rushed for 115 yards and a touchdown and recorded 45 receiving yards during the 31–28 loss. Cook was named the NFC Offensive Player of the Month for his performance in November. In Week 13 against the Jacksonville Jaguars, Cook recorded 120 rushing yards and 59 receiving yards during the 27–24 overtime win. In Week 15 against the Chicago Bears, Cook recorded 159 yards from scrimmage and a rushing touchdown during the 33–27 loss.

Cook finished the 2020 season with a career-high 1,557 rushing yards and 16 touchdowns, plus 361 receiving yards and one touchdown, despite missing a game with a groin injury, and the final game of the season due to the unexpected death of his father. He was named to the Pro Bowl. He was ranked 20th by his fellow players on the NFL Top 100 Players of 2021.

==== 2021 season ====
In Week 2, against the Arizona Cardinals, Cook totaled 22 carries for 131 rushing yards in the 34–33 loss. In Week 6, against the Carolina Panthers, he had 29 carries for 140 yards and a touchdown. In Week 14, just 11 days after dislocating his shoulder, Cook totaled 205 rushing yards on 27 carries along with two rushing touchdowns as the Vikings won 28–36 over the Pittsburgh Steelers. Cook finished the 2021 season with 249 carries for 1,159 rushing yards and six rushing touchdowns to go along with 34 receptions for 224 receiving yards. He earned a third consecutive Pro Bowl nomination.

At the conclusion of the 2021 season, Cook announced he would be wearing the number 4 jersey beginning with the 2022 NFL season. He was ranked 31st by his fellow players on the NFL Top 100 Players of 2022.

==== 2022 season ====
In Week 5, against the Bears, Cook had 121 scrimmage yards and two rushing touchdowns in the 29–22 victory. In Week 8, against the Cardinals, he had 141 scrimmage yards in the 34–26 victory. In Week 10, against the Buffalo Bills, he had 14 carries for 119 rushing yards in the 33–30 victory. During Week 15, against the Indianapolis Colts, he had 190 scrimmage yards and a receiving touchdown during the 39–36 overtime victory, in which the Vikings completed the largest comeback victory in NFL history.

Overall, Cook had 264 carries for 1,173 rushing yards and eight rushing touchdowns, 39 receptions for 295 receiving yards and two receiving touchdowns, and four fumbles, all of which were lost. He went over 100 scrimmage yards in five games. He was named to the Pro Bowl.

During the Wild Card Round against the Giants, Cook had 15 carries for 60 rushing yards and six receptions for ten yards in the 24–31 loss. He was ranked 91st by his fellow players on the NFL Top 100 Players of 2023.

On June 9, 2023, the Vikings announced that they had released Cook after he declined to take a pay cut.

=== New York Jets ===
Cook signed a one-year contract with the New York Jets on August 15, 2023. He appeared in 15 games and made one start for the Jets, but his playing time was severely hampered by lead RB Breece Hall. He totaled 67 carries for 214 rushing yards. After 17 weeks, Cook and the Jets mutually agreed to part ways on January 2, 2024.

=== Baltimore Ravens ===
After going unclaimed on waivers, Cook signed with the Baltimore Ravens practice squad on January 4, 2024. He was signed to the active roster on January 18. He made his team debut in the Ravens' Divisional Round 34–10 win over the Houston Texans, rushing the ball eight times for 23 yards, including a 19-yard run on his first carry.

=== Dallas Cowboys ===
On August 28, 2024, Cook was signed to the Dallas Cowboys' practice squad. He reunited with defensive coordinator Mike Zimmer, who was his head coach with the Minnesota Vikings. He was signed because the team was trying to implement a running back by committee approach after losing Tony Pollard in free agency and Cook was expected to improve the depth at the position. In Week 8 against the San Francisco 49ers, he was elevated to the active roster to provide depth after Rico Dowdle sat out with an illness and had 6 carries for 12 yards. In Week 9 against the Atlanta Falcons, he was elevated to the active roster, to provide depth after Ezekiel Elliott was suspended due to disciplinary reasons and tallied 2 carries for 8 yards. He had light participation in his two appearances and remained inactive on the practice squad for most of the season. He was not re-signed after the season.

== Career statistics ==
=== NFL ===
Legend
**Bold**	Career high

==== Regular season ====
Year	Team	Games		Rushing					Receiving					Fumbles	
Year	Team	GP	GS	Att	Yds	Avg	Lng	TD	Rec	Yds	Avg	Lng	TD	Fum	Lost
2017	MIN	4	4	74	354	4.8	33	2	11	90	8.2	36	0	1	1
2018	MIN	11	10	133	615	4.6	70	2	40	305	7.6	27	**2**	2	2
2019	MIN	14	14	250	1,135	4.5	75	13	**53**	**519**	9.8	31	0	4	2
2020	MIN	14	14	**312**	**1,557**	**5.0**	70	**16**	44	361	8.2	50	1	**5**	3
2021	MIN	13	13	249	1,159	4.7	66	6	34	224	6.6	24	0	3	2
2022	MIN	**17**	**17**	264	1,173	4.4	**81**	8	39	295	7.6	**64**	**2**	4	**4**
2023	NYJ	15	1	67	214	3.2	14	0	15	78	5.2	15	0	2	2
2024	DAL	2	0	8	20	2.5	4	0	1	10	**10.0**	10	0	0	0
Career		90	73	1,357	6,227	4.6	81	47	237	1,882	7.9	64	5	21	16

==== Postseason ====
Year	Team	Games		Rushing					Receiving					Fumbles	
Year	Team	GP	GS	Att	Yds	Avg	Lng	TD	Rec	Yds	Avg	Lng	TD	Fum	Lost
2017	MIN	0	0	Did not play due to injury											
2019	MIN	**2**	**2**	**37**	**112**	3.0	**22**	**2**	**9**	**44**	**4.9**	**19**	0	**1**	0
2022	MIN	1	1	15	60	**4.0**	11	0	6	10	1.7	6	0	0	0
2023	BAL	1	0	8	23	2.9	19	0	0	0	0.0	0	0	0	0
Career		4	3	60	195	3.3	22	2	15	54	3.6	19	0	1	0

=== College ===
Season	Team	Rushing				Receiving				Scrimmage			
Season	Team	Att	Yds	Avg	TD	Rec	Yds	Avg	TD	Plays	Yds	Avg	TD
2014	Florida State	170	1,008	5.9	8	22	203	9.2	0	192	1,211	6.3	8
2015	Florida State	229	1,691	7.4	19	24	244	10.2	1	253	1,935	7.6	20
2016	Florida State	288	1,765	6.1	19	33	488	14.8	1	321	2,253	7.0	20
Career		687	4,464	6.5	46	79	935	11.8	2	766	5,399	7.0	48

== Legal issues ==
During his freshman year at FSU, Cook was involved in off-field incidents on three occasions. He was charged with criminal mischief after a June BB gun incident that resulted in broken car windows. In July, according to an ESPN report, Cook was named as an "associate" in an assault case of two men the Tallahassee police investigated for allegedly brandishing a firearm at a neighbor; the incident took place at Cook's apartment. This came after Cook was cited for maltreatment of three pit bull puppies, ages of eight months and two months. The dogs were chained up with heavy chains and no shelter. The chains were heavy enough that the dogs were unable to move, and the two month old puppies were choking. When asked for identification, Cook stated he did not have it, so the animal control officer on scene brought in a law enforcement officer to assist in identifying Cook.

The summer before his sophomore year, Cook was accused of punching a woman outside of a Tallahassee bar after a confrontation and was charged with assault, to which he pled not guilty. A jury found Cook not guilty, and he was able to return to the football team.

On November 9, 2021, Cook was accused of assault, battery, and false imprisonment to his former girlfriend causing a concussion in November 2020, an allegation which he denies. He stated that "only the truth will come out", in response to those allegations. In 2024, the case was settled out of court for undisclosed terms.

== Personal life ==
Cook is the older brother of Bills running back James Cook. In August 2023, Dalvin welcomed his first son with Instagram influencer Neri J.
