= Miami Hurricanes football statistical leaders =

The logo of Miami Hurricanes football

The Miami Hurricanes football statistical leaders are individual statistical leaders of the Miami Hurricanes football program in various categories, including passing, rushing, receiving, total offense, defensive stats, and kicking. Within those areas, the lists identify single-game, single-season, and career leaders. The Hurricanes represent the University of Miami in the NCAA Division I FBS Atlantic Coast Conference.

Miami began competing in intercollegiate football in 1926, but these lists are dominated by more recent players for several reasons:

- Since 1926, seasons have increased from 10 games to 11 and then 12 games in length.
- The NCAA didn't allow freshmen to play varsity football until 1972 (with the exception of the World War II years), allowing players to have four-year careers.
- Bowl games only began counting toward single-season and career statistics in 2002. The Hurricanes have played in 12 bowl games since this decision, giving many recent players an extra game to accumulate statistics.
- Due to COVID-19, the NCAA ruled that the 2020 season would not count against the athletic eligibility of any football player, giving all players who appeared in that season five years of eligibility instead of the normal four.
- From 2018 through 2025, players were allowed to participate in as many as four games in a redshirt season; previously, playing in even one game "burned" the redshirt. In 2024 and 2025, postseason games did not count against the four-game limit. These changes to redshirt rules have given very recent players several extra games to accumulate statistics.
- A more recent change likely to significantly affect future career leaderboards was introduced in 2026 with full implementation starting with the 2027 freshman class. Going forward, redshirting will be prohibited, but players will have five years of full athletic eligibility, provided that they are no older than 19 when they first enroll in a postsecondary institution. Players who had remaining eligibility under previous rules at the end of the 2025 season will benefit from the new rule.

These lists are updated through Week 12 of the 2026 season. Players active for Miami in 2026 are in bold.

== Passing ==
=== Passing yards ===
Career
Rank	Player	Yards	Years
1	Brad Kaaya	9,968	2014 2015 2016
2	Ken Dorsey	9,565	1999 2000 2001 2002
3	Jacory Harris	8,826	2008 2009 2010 2011
4	Stephen Morris	7,896	2010 2011 2012 2013
5	Gino Torretta	7,690	1989 1990 1991 1992
6	Tyler Van Dyke	7,478	2020 2021 2022 2023
7	Vinny Testaverde	6,058	1982 1984 1985 1986
8	Craig Erickson	6,056	1987 1988 1989 1990
9	Ryan Clement	6,004	1994 1995 1996 1997
10	Bernie Kosar	5,971	1983 1984

Single season
Rank	Player	Yards	Year
1	Cam Ward	4,313	2024
2	Carson Beck	3,813	2025
3	Bernie Kosar	3,642	1984
4	Brad Kaaya	3,532	2016
5	Ken Dorsey	3,369	2002
6	Craig Erickson	3,363	1990
7	Jacory Harris	3,352	2009
8	Stephen Morris	3,345	2012
9	**Darian Mensah**	3,317	2026
10	Vinny Testaverde	3,238	1985
	Brad Kaaya	3,238	2015

Single game
Rank	Player	Yards	Year	Opponent
1	Stephen Morris	566	2012	North Carolina State
2	Tyler Van Dyke	496	2022	North Carolina
3	Gino Torretta	485	1991	San Diego State
4	Gino Torretta	468	1989	San Jose State
5	Craig Erickson	467	1990	California
6	Bernie Kosar	447	1984	Boston College
7	Cam Ward	437	2024	California
8	Stephen Morris	436	2012	Georgia Tech
9	Gino Torretta	433	1992	Iowa
10	D'Eriq King	430	2020	NC State

=== Passing touchdowns ===
Career
Rank	Player	TDs	Years
1	Ken Dorsey	86	1999 2000 2001 2002
2	Jacory Harris	70	2008 2009 2010 2011
3	Brad Kaaya	69	2014 2015 2016
4	Tyler Van Dyke	54	2021 2022 2023
5	Stephen Morris	49	2010 2011 2012 2013
6	Vinny Testaverde	48	1982 1984 1985 1986
7	Steve Walsh	48	1986 1987 1988
8	Gino Torretta	47	1989 1990 1991 1992
9	Craig Erickson	46	1987 1988 1989 1990
10	Ryan Clement	43	1994 1995 1996 1997

Single season
Rank	Player	TDs	Year
1	Cam Ward	39	2024
2	Carson Beck	30	2025
3	Steve Walsh	29	1988
	**Darian Mensah**	29	2026
5	Ken Dorsey	28	2002
6	Brad Kaaya	27	2016
7	Vinny Testaverde	26	1986
	Brad Kaaya	26	2014
	Malik Rosier	26	2017
10	Bernie Kosar	25	1984
	Ken Dorsey	25	2000
	Tyler Van Dyke	25	2021

Single game
Rank	Player	TDs	Year	Opponent
1	Jarren Williams	6	2019	Louisville
2	Bernie Kosar	5	1984	Cincinnati
	Steve Walsh	5	1988	Cincinnati
	Ken Dorsey	5	2000	Boston College
	Brock Berlin	5	2004	North Carolina State
	Kyle Wright	5	2005	Wake Forest
	Stephen Morris	5	2012	North Carolina State
	D'Eriq King	5	2020	NC State
	Tyler Van Dyke	5	2023	Texas A&M
	Cam Ward	5	2024	Ball State
	Cam Ward	5	2024	Duke
	Darian Mensah	5	2026	Stanford

== Rushing ==
=== Rushing yards ===
Career
Rank	Player	Yards	Years
1	Duke Johnson	3,519	2012 2013 2014
2	Ottis Anderson	3,331	1975 1976 1977 1978
3	Edgerrin James	2,960	1996 1997 1998
4	James Jackson	2,953	1996 1997 1998 1999 2000
5	**Mark Fletcher**	2,913	2023 2024 2025 2026
6	Clinton Portis	2,523	1999 2000 2001
7	Graig Cooper	2,383	2007 2008 2009 2010
8	Danyell Ferguson	2,214	1992 1994 1995 1996
9	Javarris James	2,162	2006 2007 2008 2009
10	Joseph Yearby	2,119	2014 2015 2016

Single season
Rank	Player	Yards	Year
1	Willis McGahee	1,753	2002
2	Duke Johnson	1,652	2014
3	Edgerrin James	1,416	1998
4	Lamar Miller	1,272	2011
5	Ottis Anderson	1,266	1978
6	Clinton Portis	1,200	2001
7	Mark Fletcher	1,192	2025
8	Mark Walton	1,117	2016
9	Edgerrin James	1,098	1997
10	Danyell Ferguson	1,069	1995

Single game
Rank	Player	Yards	Year	Opponent
1	Edgerrin James	299	1998	UCLA
2	Edgerrin James	271	1997	Boston College
3	Duke Johnson	249	2014	Virginia Tech
	Lorenzo Roan	249	1980	East Carolina
5	Willis McGahee	205	2002	Virginia Tech
6	Willis McGahee	204	2002	Florida
	Mark Walton	204	2017	Toledo
8	Jason Geathers	199	2002	Florida A&M
9	Frank Gore	195	2004	Virginia
	Tyrone Moss	195	2005	North Carolina

=== Rushing touchdowns ===
Career
Rank	Player	TDs	Years
1	**Mark Fletcher**	39	2023 2024 2025 2026
2	Stephen McGuire	35	1989 1990 1991 1992
3	Edgerrin James	32	1996 1997 1998
4	Willis McGahee	31	2001 2002
5	James Jackson	29	1997 1998 1999 2000
6	Mel Bratton	26	1984 1985 1986 1987
	Tyrone Moss	26	2003 2004 2005 2006
	Duke Johnson	26	2012 2013 2014
	Mark Walton	26	2015 2016 2017
10	Eddie Dunn	25	1936 1937 1938

Single season
Rank	Player	TDs	Year
1	Willis McGahee	28	2002
2	Edgerrin James	17	1998
3	Eddie Dunn	14	1938
	Mark Walton	14	2016
5	Harry Ghaul	13	1945
	Edgerrin James	13	1997
	**Mark Fletcher**	13	2026
8	James Stewart	12	1994
	Mark Fletcher	12	2025
	Danyell Ferguson	12	1995
	Tyrone Moss	12	2005

Single game
Rank	Player	TDs	Year	Opponent
1	Willis McGahee	6	2002	Virginia Tech
2	Bill L’Italien	5	1932	Piedmont
3	Alonzo Highsmith	4	1984	Notre Dame
	Mel Bratton	4	1984	Boston College
	Willis McGahee	4	2002	Temple
	Tyrone Moss	4	2005	North Carolina
	Mark Walton	4	2016	Florida Atlantic

== Receiving ==
=== Receptions ===
Career
Rank	Player	Rec	Years
1	Xavier Restrepo	200	2020 2021 2022 2023 2024
2	Mike Harley Jr.	182	2017 2018 2019 2020 2021
	**Malachi Toney**	182	2025 2026
4	Reggie Wayne	173	1997 1998 1999 2000
5	Stacy Coley	166	2013 2014 2015 2016
6	Lamar Thomas	144	1989 1990 1991 1992
7	Michael Irvin	143	1985 1986 1987
	Santana Moss	143	1997 1998 1999 2000
9	Leonard Hankerson	134	2007 2008 2009 2010
10	Travis Benjamin	131	2008 2009 2010 2011

Single season
Rank	Player	Rec	Year
1	Malachi Toney	109	2025
2	Xavier Restrepo	85	2023
3	Charleston Rambo	79	2021
4	**Malachi Toney**	73	2026
5	Leonard Hankerson	72	2010
6	Xavier Restrepo	69	2024
7	Willie Smith	66	1984
8	Stacy Coley	63	2016
9	Allen Hurns	62	2013
10	Wesley Carroll	61	1990

Single game
Rank	Player	Rec	Year	Opponent
1	Malachi Toney	16	2026	Pittsburgh
2	Mike Harley Jr.	13	2021	Duke
	Malachi Toney	13	2025	Pittsburgh
4	Willie Smith	12	1984	Maryland
	Phillip Dorsett	12	2012	USF
	Charleston Rambo	12	2021	Michigan State
	Xavier Restrepo	12	2023	Georgia Tech
	Malachi Toney	12	2025	Virginia Tech
	Malachi Toney	12	2026	Stanford
	Malachi Toney	12	2026	Wake Forest

=== Receiving yards ===
Career
Rank	Player	Yards	Years
1	Xavier Restrepo	2,844	2020 2021 2022 2023 2024
2	Santana Moss	2,546	1997 1998 1999 2000
3	Reggie Wayne	2,510	1997 1998 1999 2000
4	Michael Irvin	2,423	1985 1986 1987
5	Lamar Thomas	2,271	1989 1990 1991 1992
6	**Malachi Toney**	2,238	2025 2026
7	Stacy Coley	2,218	2013 2014 2015 2016
8	Leonard Hankerson	2,160	2007 2008 2009 2010
9	Mike Harley Jr.	2,158	2017 2018 2019 2020 2021
10	Travis Benjamin	2,146	2008 2009 2010 2011

Single season
Rank	Player	Yards	Year
1	Malachi Toney	1,211	2025
2	Charleston Rambo	1,172	2021
3	Allen Hurns	1,162	2013
4	Leonard Hankerson	1,156	2010
5	Xavier Restrepo	1,127	2024
6	Eddie Brown	1,114	1984
7	Andre Johnson	1,092	2002
	Xavier Restrepo	1,092	2023
9	**Malachi Toney**	1,027	2026
10	Wesley Carroll	952	1990

Single game
Rank	Player	Yards	Year	Opponent
1	Malachi Toney	234	2026	Stanford
2	Eddie Brown	220	1984	Boston College
3	Charleston Rambo	210	2021	Georgia Tech
4	Wesley Carroll	208	1990	California
5	Phillip Dorsett	201	2014	Arkansas State
6	Andre Johnson	199	2001	Nebraska
7	Michael Irvin	194	1986	East Carolina
	Malachi Toney	194	2026	Pittsburgh
9	Andre Johnson	193	2002	Virginia Tech
	Xavier Restrepo	193	2023	Louisville

=== Receiving touchdowns ===
Career
Rank	Player	TDs	Years
1	Michael Irvin	26	1985 1986 1987
2	Lamar Thomas	23	1989 1990 1991 1992
	**Malachi Toney**	23	2025 2026
4	Leonard Hankerson	22	2007 2008 2009 2010
5	Xavier Restrepo	21	2020 2021 2022 2023 2024
6	Reggie Wayne	20	1997 1998 1999 2000
	Andre Johnson	20	2000 2001 2002
	Stacy Coley	20	2013 2014 2015 2016
9	Santana Moss	19	1997 1998 1999 2000
10	Phillip Dorsett	17	2011 2012 2013 2014
	Jacolby George	17	2021 2022 2023 2024

Single season
Rank	Player	TDs	Year
1	Leonard Hankerson	13	2010
	**Malachi Toney**	13	2026
3	Michael Irvin	11	1986
	Xavier Restrepo	11	2024
5	Lamar Thomas	10	1992
	Malachi Toney	10	2025
	Reggie Wayne	10	2000
	Andre Johnson	10	2001
	Phillip Dorsett	10	2014
10	Eddie Brown	9	1984
	Michael Irvin	9	1985
	Andre Johnson	9	2002
	Stacy Coley	9	2016
	Braxton Berrios	9	2017

Single game
Rank	Player	TDs	Year	Opponent
1	Tony Gaiter	3	1996	Pittsburgh
	Santana Moss	3	1998	Rutgers
	Leonard Hankerson	3	2010	Clemson
	Jacolby George	3	2023	Texas A&M
	Xavier Restrepo	3	2024	Duke
	Malachi Toney	3	2026	Stanford
	Malachi Toney	3	2026	Pittsburgh

== Total offense ==
Total offense is the sum of passing and rushing statistics. It does not include receiving or returns.

=== Total offense yards ===
Career
Rank	Player	Yards	Years
1	Brad Kaaya	9,582	2014 2015 2016
2	Ken Dorsey	9,486	1999 2000 2001 2002
3	Jacory Harris	8,823	2008 2009 2010 2011
4	Stephen Morris	7,950	2010 2011 2012 2013
5	Tyler Van Dyke	7,510	2020 2021 2022 2023
6	Gino Torretta	7,722	1989 1990 1991 1992
7	Craig Erickson	6,021	1987 1988 1989 1990
8	Vinny Testaverde	5,738	1982 1984 1985 1986
9	Kyle Wright	5,706	2004 2005 2006 2007
10	Ryan Clement	5,659	1994 1995 1996 1997

Single season
Rank	Player	Yards	Year
1	Cam Ward	4,517	2024
2	Carson Beck	3,870	2025
3	Malik Rosier	3,588	2017
4	**Darian Mensah**	3,485	2026
5	Stephen Morris	3,415	2012
6	Bernie Kosar	3,412	1984
7	Brad Kaaya	3,396	2016
8	Craig Erickson	3,389	1990
9	Ken Dorsey	3,330	2002
10	D'Eriq King	3,224	2020

Single game
Rank	Player	Yards	Year	Opponent
1	Stephen Morris	568	2012	North Carolina State
2	D'Eriq King	535	2020	NC State
3	Tyler Van Dyke	498	2022	North Carolina
4	Gino Torretta	474	1991	San Diego State
5	Craig Erickson	472	1990	California
6	Cam Ward	452	2024	California
7	Gino Torretta	451	1992	Iowa
8	Cam Ward	447	2024	South Florida
9	Stephen Morris	446	2012	Georgia Tech
10	Gino Torretta	443	1989	San Jose State

=== Touchdowns responsible for ===
"Touchdowns responsible for" encompasses a player's combined rushing and passing touchdowns.

Career
Rank	Player	TDs	Years
1	Ken Dorsey	88	1999 2000 2001 2002
2	Jacory Harris	75	2008 2009 2010 2011
3	Brad Kaaya	73	2014 2015 2016
4	Vinny Testaverde	56	1982 1984 1985 1986
5	Tyler Van Dyke	56	2020 2021 2022 2023
6	Stephen Morris	52	2010 2011 2012 2013
7	Craig Erickson	50	1987 1988 1989 1990
8	Steve Walsh	49	1986 1987 1988
	Gino Torretta	49	1989 1990 1991 1992
10	Bernie Kosar	48	1983 1984
	Ryan Clement	48	1994 1995 1996 1997

Single season
Rank	Player	TDs	Year
1	Cam Ward	43	2024
2	Carson Beck	32	2025
3	Malik Rosier	31	2017
	**Darian Mensah**	31	2026
5	Vinny Testaverde	30	1986
6	Bernie Kosar	29	1984
	Steve Walsh	29	1988
8	Ken Dorsey	28	2002
	Willis McGahee	28	2002
10	Brad Kaaya	27	2014
	Brad Kaaya	27	2016
	D'Eriq King	27	2020

== Defense ==
=== Interceptions ===
Career
Rank	Player	Ints	Years
1	Ed Reed	21	1998 1999 2000 2001
2	Bennie Blades	19	1984 1985 1986 1987
3	Jim Dooley	17	1949 1950 1951
4	Fred Marion	16	1978 1979 1980 1981
5	Sean Taylor	14	2001 2002 2003
6	Whitey Rouviere	13	1952 1953 1954 1955
	Gene Coleman	13	1977 1978 1979
8	Bryan Ferguson	11	1975 1976 1977
	Roland Smith	11	1987 1988 1989 1990
	Kamren Kinchens	11	2021 2022 2023

Single season
Rank	Player	Ints	Year
1	Bennie Blades	10	1986
	Sean Taylor	10	2003
3	Gene Coleman	9	1979
	Ed Reed	9	2001
5	Ed Reed	8	2000
6	Whitey Rouviere	7	1954
	Racey Timmons	7	1960
	Bryan Ferguson	7	1977
	Fred Marion	7	1980

Single game
Rank	Player	Ints	Year	Opponent
1	Joe Dixon	3	1937	Catholic
	Bill Steiner	3	1940	Georgia
	Al Hudson	3	1945	Michigan State
	Whitey Campbell	3	1946	Chattanooga
	Whitey Campbell	3	1947	Rollins
	Al Hudson	3	1948	Georgia
	John Bookman	3	1956	Boston College
	Larry DiGiammarino	3	1958	Oregon
	Gene Coleman	3	1979	Florida
	Bobby Harden	3	1988	BYU
	Kenny Phillips	3	2006	Duke
	Kamren Kinchens	3	2022	Georgia Tech

=== Tackles ===
Career
Rank	Player	Tackles	Years
1	Dan Morgan	532	1997 1998 1999 2000
2	George Mira Jr.	490	1984 1985 1986 1987
3	Scott Nicolas	456	1978 1979 1980
4	Micheal Barrow	423	1989 1990 1991 1992
5	Darrin Smith	401	1989 1990 1991 1992
6	Ray Lewis	388	1993 1994 1995
7	Jonathan Vilma	377	2000 2001 2002 2003
8	Rod Carter	361	1985 1986 1987 1988
9	Shaquille Quarterman	356	2016 2017 2018 2019
10	Denzel Perryman	351	2011 2012 2013 2014

Single season
Rank	Player	Tackles	Year
1	Ray Lewis	160	1995
2	Ray Lewis	152	1994
3	Dan Morgan	150	1998
	Nate Webster	150	1999
5	George Mira Jr.	147	1987
6	Ken Sisk	139	1983
7	Dan Morgan	138	2000
8	Greg Threat	136	2004
9	Jay Brophy	135	1982
	George Mira Jr.	135	1985

=== Sacks ===
Career
Rank	Player	Sacks	Years
1	Danny Stubbs	39.5	1984 1985 1986 1987
2	Greg Mark	34.5	1986 1987 1988 1989
3	Kenny Holmes	30.0	1993 1994 1995 1996
4	Akheem Mesidor	25.5	2022 2023 2024 2025
5	Jamaal Green	24.0	1999 2000 2001 2002
6	Kevin Patrick	23.0	1990 1991 1992 1993
	Kenard Lang	23.0	1994 1995 1996
8	Bob Nelson	22.0	1978 1979 1980 1981
	Bill Hawkins	22.0	1985 1986 1987 1988
	Rusty Medearis	22.0	1990 1991 1992 1994

Single season
Rank	Player	Sacks	Year
1	Danny Stubbs	17.0	1986
2	Greg Mark	15.5	1989
	Gregory Rousseau	15.5	2019
4	Don Latimer	15.0	1977
5	Akheem Mesidor	12.5	2025
6	Danny Stubbs	12.0	1985
	Kenard Lang	12.0	1996
	Derrick Ham	12.0	1998
9	Kenny Holmes	11.0	1996
	Kareem Brown	11.0	2006
10	Russell Maryland	10.5	1990
	Warren Sapp	10.5	1994
	Calais Campbell	10.5	2006

== Kicking ==
=== Field goals made ===
Career
Rank	Player	FGs	Years
1	Michael Badgley	77	2014 2015 2016 2017
2	Andrés Borregales	74	2021 2022 2023 2024
3	Carlos Huerta	73	1988 1989 1990 1991
4	Jon Peattie	64	2003 2004 2005 2006
5	Danny Miller	56	1978 1979 1980 1981
6	Greg Cox	47	1984 1985 1986 1987
7	Todd Sievers	45	1998 2000 2001 2002
	Matt Bosher	45	2008 2009 2010
9	Andy Crosland	44	1996 1997 1998 1999
10	Dane Prewitt	41	1992 1993 1994 1995

Single season
Rank	Player	FGs	Year
1	Michael Badgley	25	2015
2	Jon Peattie	22	2003
	Andrés Borregales	22	2023
4	Carlos Huerta	21	1988
	Todd Sievers	21	2001
	Michael Badgley	21	2016
7	José Borregales	20	2020
8	Jake Wieclaw	19	2012
9	Danny Miller	18	1981
	Carlos Huerta	18	1989
	Matt Bosher	18	2008
	Andrés Borregales	18	2024

Single game
Rank	Player	FGs	Year	Opponent
1	Jon Peattie	5	2003	West Virginia
	Michael Badgley	5	2015	Nebraska
	Michael Badgley	5	2015	Pittsburgh
4	Danny Miller	4	1980	North Texas
	Danny Miller	4	1981	Houston
	Greg Cox	4	1984	Florida
	Carlos Huerta	4	1990	Syracuse
	Dane Prewitt	4	1994	Washington
	Todd Sievers	4	2001	Penn State
	Michael Badgley	4	2016	Duke
	José Borregales	4	2020	Louisville
	Andrés Borregales	4	2021	Duke
	Andrés Borregales	4	2022	Virginia
