= Brad Kaaya =

American football player (born 1995)

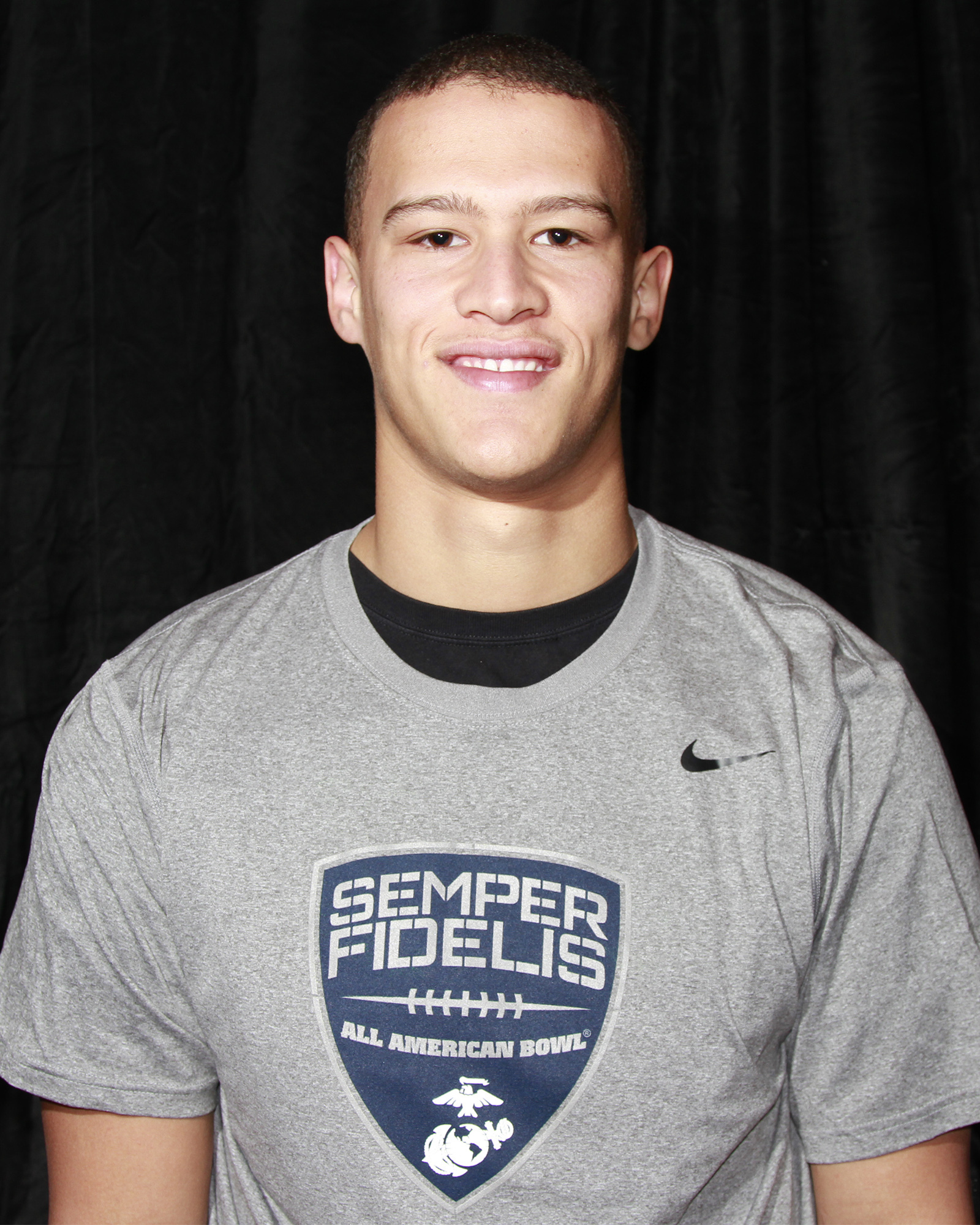
- Kaaya c. 2014

No. 8, 9
- Position: Quarterback

Personal information
- Born: September 3, 1995 (age 31); Los Angeles, California, U.S.
- Listed height: 6 ft 4 in (1.93 m)
- Listed weight: 215 lb (98 kg)

Career information
- High school: Chaminade College Preparatory (Los Angeles)
- College: Miami (FL)
- NFL draft: 2017: 6th round, 215th overall pick

Career history
- Detroit Lions (2017)*; Carolina Panthers (2017); Detroit Lions (2017); Indianapolis Colts (2017–2018); Cincinnati Bengals (2018)
- * Offseason or practice squad member only

Awards and highlights
- Third-team All-ACC (2015); ACC Rookie of the Year (2014); ACC Offensive Rookie of the Year (2014)
- Stats at Pro Football Reference

Bradley Mathias Kaaya Jr. (born September 3, 1995) is an American former professional football player who was a quarterback in the National Football League (NFL). He played college football for the Miami Hurricanes from 2014 to 2016, and was selected by the Detroit Lions in sixth round of the 2017 NFL draft. Kaaya is the all time passing yards leader at Miami.

== Early life ==
Kaaya attended Chaminade College Preparatory School in West Hills, Los Angeles, California, where he played high school football for the Eagles. As a senior, he threw for a school-record 3,855 yards and 27 touchdowns. During his high school career, he threw for 5,730 yards and 40 touchdowns while leading his school to their first ever CIF and CA State Championship (2013). He was ranked by the Rivals.com recruiting network as the eighth best pro-style quarterback recruit in his class and was also a member of Nike's Elite 11, showcasing the top 11 quarterback recruits in the nation.

== College career ==
Kaaya was named the Hurricanes starting quarterback as a true freshman over Jake Heaps by head coach Al Golden on August 24, 2014. Kaaya led the Hurricanes to a 6–7 overall record and a bowl appearance, losing to South Carolina in the 2014 Independence Bowl. Kaaya was named Atlantic Coast Conference Rookie of the year following a 2014 regular season in which he led the conference in pass efficiency and touchdown passes. In his second year starting, the 2015 Hurricanes improved to 8–5, with a loss to Washington State in the Sun Bowl. Kaaya had the 2016 Hurricanes off to their best start of his career, going 4–1 and reaching as high as #10 in the AP Poll. As a sophomore, Kaaya completed 239 of 390 passing attempts for 3,242 yards, 16 touchdowns, and five interceptions. He was named a Third-team All-ACC selection.

Miami finished the 2016 season with a 9–4 record and a win over West Virginia in the 2016 Russell Athletic Bowl. Kaaya was named bowl MVP and became Miami's all-time leader in nearly every passing statistic, including yards.

Kaaya (left) handing off to Duke Johnson (right) in 2014

On January 2, 2017, Kaaya announced that he would be entering the 2017 NFL draft rather than returning to Miami for his final season of eligibility.

=== Statistics ===
Season	Team	GP	Passing					
Season	Team	GP	Cmp	Att	Pct	Yds	TD	Int
2014	Miami	13	221	378	58.5	3,198	26	12
2015	Miami	12	238	389	61.2	3,238	16	5
2016	Miami	13	261	421	62.0	3,532	27	7
Total		38	696	1,188	60.6	9,968	69	24

== Professional career ==
Pre-draft measurables
Height	Weight	Arm length	Hand span	Wonderlic
6 ft 3 7/8 in (1.93 m)	214 lb (97 kg)	32 in (0.81 m)	9 3/4 in (0.25 m)	34
All values from NFL Combine

=== Detroit Lions (first stint) ===
The Detroit Lions selected Kaaya in the sixth round (215th overall) of the 2017 NFL draft. He was the ninth quarterback selected in the draft. On May 12, 2017, the Lions signed Kaaya to a four-year, $2.52 million contract with a signing bonus of $123,352. He was waived by the Lions on September 2.

=== Carolina Panthers ===
On September 3, 2017, Kaaya was claimed off waivers by the Carolina Panthers. He was waived by the Panthers on October 17.

=== Detroit Lions (second stint) ===
On October 18, 2017, Kaaya was claimed off waivers by the Lions. On October 23, Kaaya was waived by the Lions and re-signed to the practice squad.

=== Indianapolis Colts ===
On December 27, 2017, Kaaya was signed by the Indianapolis Colts off the Lions' practice squad.

On August 24, 2018, Kaaya was waived/injured by the Colts and placed on injured reserve. He was waived from injured reserve on February 8, 2019.

=== Cincinnati Bengals ===
On February 11, 2019, Kaaya was claimed off waivers by the Cincinnati Bengals. However, the Bengals declined to assign him a restricted free agent tender for 2019, making Kaaya an unrestricted free agent at the start of the new league year in March.

== Personal life ==
Kaaya's mother, Angela Means, is a vegan cook and former actress, who is best known for her role as Felisha in the 1995 classic film Friday as well as Veda in House Party 3 and Aunt Vanessa in the TV series Cousin Skeeter. His father Brad Kaaya Sr. coached him in Pop Warner football and is a former screenwriter who wrote for the film O and the TV series Cousin Skeeter, Damon, and MADtv. His surname originates from Tanzania. He is of Jewish and Nigerian descent through his mother.
