= Malachi Toney =

American football player (born 2007)

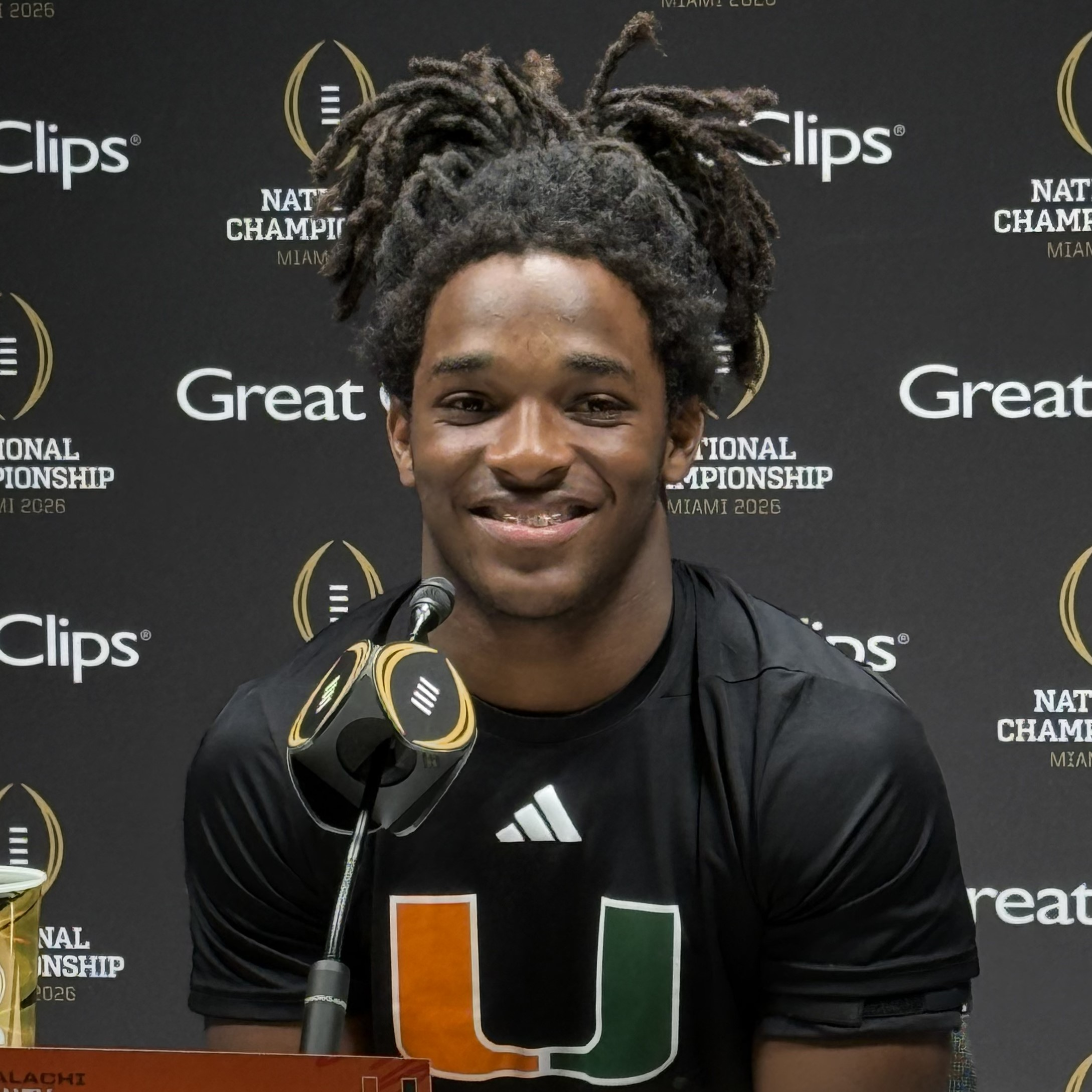
- Toney in 2026

No. 1 – Miami Hurricanes
- Position: Wide receiver
- Class: Sophomore

Personal information
- Born: September 17, 2007 (age 19); Miami, Florida, U.S.
- Listed height: 5 ft 11 in (1.80 m)
- Listed weight: 188 lb (85 kg)

Career information
- High school: American Heritage (Plantation, Florida)
- College: Miami (2025–present)

Awards and highlights
- NCAA receptions leader (2025); ACC Rookie of the Year (2025); ACC Offensive Rookie of the Year (2025); First-team All-ACC (2025) (Note: Selected at wide receiver position.); Second-team All-ACC (2025) (Note: Selected at all-purpose position.)
- Stats at ESPN

Malachi Toney (born September 17, 2007) is an American college football wide receiver for the Miami Hurricanes.

== Early life ==
Toney was born on September 17, 2007, in Miami, Florida, growing up in Miami's Liberty City neighborhood. He attended American Heritage High School in Plantation, Florida. During his final season in 2024, Toney recorded 57 receptions for 1,018 yards and 12 receiving touchdowns and also ran 36 times for 228 yards and four rushing touchdowns. American Heritage finished the season 12–2 and captured the Class 4A state championship. During American Heritage’s postseason run, starting quarterback Dia Bell sustained a season-ending injury. Toney assumed the quarterback role and guided the Patriots through the remainder of the playoffs, completing 38 of 53 passes for 524 yards, eight touchdowns, and one interception. For his dual-role performance, Toney was named the 2024 Florida High School Football Player of the Year by MaxPreps, the Broward 4A‑1A Football Offensive Player of the Year, and was awarded the Nat Moore Trophy.

Toney was originally part of the 2026 recruiting class but reclassified to the 2025 class in September 2024, foregoing a traditional senior year to enroll early in college. He committed to the University of Miami to play college football.

== College career ==
=== 2025 ===
Toney enrolled at the University of Miami in 2025 and entered his true freshman season as a starting wide receiver for the Hurricanes. Having reclassified from the 2026 recruiting class, he started the season at 17 years old, an age at which he otherwise would have been a high-school senior, making him one of the youngest starters in the FBS.

Toney made his collegiate debut in the season opener against Notre Dame, recording six receptions for 82 yards and a touchdown as Miami secured the victory, immediately establishing himself as a key contributor in the Hurricanes’ offense. He finished the 2025 regular season with 84 receptions for 970 yards and seven receiving touchdowns, along with 17 rushing attempts for 89 yards and one touchdown. Miami also utilized Toney in Wildcat packages and trick plays, where he completed 4 of 6 passes for 82 yards and two touchdowns, drawing on his high-school experience taking snaps at quarterback.

Toney had several notable performances during the season, including the regular season finale against Pittsburgh, where he tied the program record of 13 receptions (for 126 yards). He also rushed for 30 yards and threw a nine-yard touchdown pass in the game. His production set a new Miami freshman receiving-yardage record, surpassing the previous mark held by Ahmmon Richards. He earned multiple weekly honors, including ACC Wide Receiver of the Week and ACC Rookie of the Week.

At the conclusion of the season, Toney was named the ACC Rookie of the Year and ACC Offensive Rookie of the Year, and received First-team All-ACC recognition for his all-purpose contributions.

In the opening round of the College Football Playoff against Texas A&M, Toney recorded 113 all-purpose yards. With the game tied in the fourth quarter, he lost a fumble following a completed pass but later redeemed himself by scoring the game-winning touchdown on a jet sweep, the contest’s only touchdown. The victory marked Miami’s first College Football Playoff win in program history. In the process, Toney surpassed Xavier Restrepo’s single-season receptions record. Miami advanced to face Ohio State in the Cotton Bowl Classic–CFP Quarterfinal, where Toney surpassed 1,000 receiving yards and 100 rushing yards for the season as the Hurricanes defeated the defending national champions, 24–14. In the Fiesta Bowl–CFP Semifinal, he recorded five receptions for 81 yards and a touchdown in the victory over Ole Miss. In the CFP National Championship Game against Indiana, he recorded a game-high 10 receptions for 122 yards and a touchdown. Despite the loss, he became the FBS leader in receptions for the 2025 season with 109, finishing with a school-record 1,211 receiving yards, surpassing Charleston Rambo’s 2021 mark of 1,172.

=== 2026 ===
Prior to the 2026 season, Toney changed his jersey number from 10 to 1. In an interview with ACC Network's Eddie Royal, he explained the change by saying, “I'm the one, so why not change to one?”

In the first game of his sophomore season, Toney set a Miami single-game record with 234 receiving yards on 12 receptions and tied the program record with three receiving touchdowns as the Hurricanes defeated Stanford 45–6. His 234 receiving yards broke a 42-year-old school record of 220 yards set by Eddie Brown against Boston College during the 1984 season. For his performance, Toney was named ACC Receiver of the Week. Toney also drew attention for celebrating each of his three touchdowns by performing the Heisman pose. In Week 3 against Wake Forest, Toney recorded 12 receptions for 114 yards and a touchdown in the victory. Through the first four games of the season, he recorded at least one touchdown reception in each game and surpassed 100 receiving yards three times. In Week 6 against rival Florida State, Toney had 11 receptions for 154 yards and two touchdowns, in addition to completing a pass for a two-point conversion in Miami's 43–35 double-overtime victory. Following the game, Miami rose to No. 1 in the AP Poll for the first time since the 2002 season. The following week against Pittsburgh, Toney set a new career high with 16 receptions for 194 yards and three touchdowns, breaking the single-game reception record he had previously shared. Ahead of Miami's Week 8 matchup against North Carolina, opposing head coach Bill Belichick praised Toney, saying, "I don't see any weak points in his game." In the 38–35 victory, Toney recorded seven receptions for 75 yards and two touchdowns. Before a matchup against No. 11 Notre Dame, Toney sustained a high ankle sprain during practice and underwent ankle surgery, which is expected to sideline him for the remainder of the regular season.

=== Statistics ===
Legend
	Led NCAA Division I FBS
**Bold**	Career high

Year	Team	Games (Note: Toney is not officially credited with a start vs. USF; game film shows he started.)		Receiving				Rushing				Passing							
Year	Team	GP	GS	Rec	Yds	Avg	TD	Att	Yds	Avg	TD	Cmp	Att	Pct	Yds	Y/A	TD	Int	Rtg
2025	Miami	**16**	**16**	109	**1,211**	11.1	10	**23**	**113**	4.9	**1**	**4**	**7**	**57.1**	**82**	**11.7**	**2**	0	**249.8**
2026	Miami	8	8	73	1,027	**14.1**	**13**	4	61	**15.3**	0	0	0	0.0	0	0.0	0	0	0.0
Career		24	24	182	2,238	12.3	23	27	174	6.4	1	4	7	57.1	82	11.7	2	0	249.8

== Personal life ==
Toney's father, Antonio Brown, played college football for West Virginia and in the NFL for the Buffalo Bills and Washington Redskins from 2003 to 2005.

Toney frequently uses the acronym G.A.B.O.S., meaning “Game Ain't Based on Sympathy,” on his eye black while playing and on social media. He has described the phrase as a “lifestyle” that extends beyond football, saying it reflects how he carries himself and his belief that people should not expect sympathy from others. The phrase was also used by rapper Rick Ross as the title of the ninth track on his album Rather You Than Me. Toney's G.A.B.O.S. eye black was visible in his appearance on the cover of EA Sports College Football 27, on which he appeared alongside Dante Moore and Kewan Lacy.
