= Heaps (surname) =

Heaps is a surname. Notable people with the surname include:

- Abraham Albert Heaps (1885–1954), Canadian politician and labour leader
- Adrian Heaps (born c. 1954), Canadian politician
- Elizabeth Heaps, English academic and archivist
- Jake Heaps (born 1991), American football player
- Jay Heaps (born 1976), American soccer player
- Lindsey Heaps (born 1994), American women's soccer player
- Marshall T. Heaps (died 1961), American politician
- Rob Heaps, British actor
- Stanley Heaps (1880–1962), English architect

== See also ==
- Heap (surname)
