= Heap (surname) =

Heap is a surname. Notable people with the surname include:

- Bob Heap, English footballer
- Brian Heap, British biologist
- Dan Heap, Canadian politician
- David Porter Heap, American engineer
- Fred Heap, English footballer
- Imogen Heap, British singer-songwriter
- Jessica Heap, American actress
- John Heap, British geographer
- Mark Heap, British actor
- Sarah Heap, New Zealand physical education teacher and drill mistress
- Todd Heap, American football player
- Tom Heap, British television and radio reporter and presenter

== See also ==
- Heap (disambiguation)
- Heaps (surname)
- Septimus Heap
- Walter Heape (1855–1929), English zoologist and embryologist
- Heep
