= 2010 Miami Hurricanes football team =

American college football season

2010 Miami Hurricanes football

Sun Bowl, L 33–17 vs. Notre Dame
- Conference: Atlantic Coast Conference
- (Coastal)
- Record: 7–6 (5–3 ACC)
- Head coach: Randy Shannon (4th season; regular season); Jeff Stoutland (interim; bowl game)
- Offensive coordinator: Mark Whipple (2nd season)
- Offensive scheme: Pro-style
- Defensive coordinator: John Lovett (2nd season)
- Base defense: 4–3, Cover 2
- Home stadium: Sun Life Stadium

2010 Atlantic Coast Conference football standings
	Conf.			Overall
Team	W		L	W		L
Atlantic Division
No. 17 Florida State x	6	–	2	10	–	4
No. 23 Maryland	5	–	3	9	–	4
No. 25 NC State	5	–	3	9	–	4
Boston College	4	–	4	7	–	6
Clemson	4	–	4	6	–	7
Wake Forest	1	–	7	3	–	9
Coastal Division
No. 16 Virginia Tech x$	8	–	0	11	–	3
Miami (FL)	5	–	3	7	–	6
Georgia Tech	4	–	4	6	–	7
North Carolina	4	–	4	8	–	5
Duke	1	–	7	3	–	9
Virginia	1	–	7	4	–	8
Championship: Virginia Tech 44, Florida State 33
$ – BCS representative as conference champion; x – Division champion/co-champions; Rankings from AP Poll

The 2010 Miami Hurricanes football team represented the University of Miami during the 2010 NCAA Division I FBS football season. The Hurricanes were coached by Randy Shannon during the regular season, then led by interim head coach Jeff Stoutland during their bowl game and played their home games at Sun Life Stadium. They are members of the Coastal Division of the Atlantic Coast Conference. They finished the season 7–6, 5–3 in ACC play and were invited to the Sun Bowl where they were defeated by Notre Dame, 33–17.

== Schedule ==
Date	Time	Opponent	Rank	Site	TV	Result	Attendance	Source
September 2	7:30 pm	Florida A&M*	No. 13	Sun Life Stadium; Miami Gardens, FL	ESPN3	W 45–0	53,674	
September 11	3:30 pm	at No. 2 Ohio State*	No. 12	Ohio Stadium; Columbus, OH	ESPN	L 24–36	105,454	
September 23	7:30 pm	at Pittsburgh*	No. 19	Heinz Field; Pittsburgh, PA	ESPN	W 31–3	58,115	
October 2	12:00 pm	at Clemson	No. 16	Memorial Stadium; Clemson, SC	ESPN2	W 30–21	82,313	
October 9	8:00 pm	No. 23 Florida State	No. 13	Sun Life Stadium; Miami Gardens, FL (rivalry)	ABC	L 17–45	75,115	
October 16	1:00 pm	at Duke		Wallace Wade Stadium; Durham, NC	ESPN3	W 28–13	25,911	
October 23	7:30 pm	North Carolina	No. 25	Sun Life Stadium; Miami Gardens, FL	ESPN2	W 33–10	43,584	
October 30	12:00 pm	at Virginia	No. 22	Scott Stadium; Charlottesville, VA	ESPN	L 19–24	39,528	
November 6	12:00 pm	Maryland^{†}		Sun Life Stadium; Miami Gardens, FL	ESPNU	W 26–20	55,434	
November 13	12:00 pm	at Georgia Tech		Bobby Dodd Stadium; Atlanta, GA	ACCN	W 35–10	47,425	
November 20	3:30 pm	No. 14 Virginia Tech	No. 24	Sun Life Stadium; Miami Gardens, FL (rivalry)	ESPN	L 17–31	40,101	
November 27	12:00 pm	South Florida*		Sun Life Stadium; Miami Gardens, FL	ESPNU	L 20–23 ^{OT}	41,148	
December 31	2:00 pm	vs. Notre Dame*		Sun Bowl; El Paso, TX (Sun Bowl, rivalry)	CBS	L 17–33	54,021	
*Non-conference game; ^{†}Homecoming; Rankings from AP Poll released prior to the game; All times are in Eastern time

== Rankings ==
Ranking movements Legend: ██ Increase in ranking ██ Decrease in ranking — = Not ranked RV = Received votes
	Week															
Poll	Pre	1	2	3	4	5	6	7	8	9	10	11	12	13	14	Final
AP	13	12	17	19	16	13	RV	25	22	RV	RV	24	RV	—	—	—
Coaches	13	12	17	19	17	14	RV	25	22	RV	RV	21	RV	—	—	—
Harris	Not released						RV	24	22	RV	RV	24	RV	—	—	Not released
BCS	Not released							—	22	—	—	24	—	—	—	Not released

== Preseason ==
Following Miami's loss to Wisconsin in the Champs Sports Bowl, defensive lineman Allen Bailey, wide receiver Leonard Hankerson, and offensive lineman Orlando Franklin announced they would be returning for their senior seasons despite being considered possible candidates to enter the 2010 NFL draft.

In January it was reported that defensive line coach and recruiting coordinator Clint Hurtt would be leaving to go to the University of Louisville to become their new defensive line coach. On January 27, Miami hired Rick Petri to replace Hurtt as the defensive line coach. Petri had previously coached at the University of Kentucky and had once coached the defensive line before at Miami between 1993 and 1995. Wide receivers coach Aubrey Hill was named the new recruiting coordinator. In February, running backs coach Tommie Robinson left to take the same position for the Arizona Cardinals. He was replaced by Mike Cassano, who was previously running backs coach and recruiting coordinator at Florida International University, and had also coached at the University of Massachusetts Amherst under current Miami offensive coordinator Mark Whipple. Head coach Randy Shannon later announced that defensive assistant Michael Barrow would be returning to his position of full-time linebackers coach after defensive coordinator John Lovett had filled the position during the 2009 season. Barrow had been the linebackers coach in 2007 and 2008.

Miami began spring practice on February 23. Quarterback Jacory Harris only participated in non-throwing drills while recovering from a shoulder injury. Miami concluded spring practice with its spring game on March 27.

In March 2010, the Miami track team signed Latwan Anderson, who was also a four-star defensive back recruit in football. Anderson will walk on to the football team in the fall. Anderson's track scholarship will convert to a football scholarship once he plays in his first football game.

On May 12, Randy Shannon signed a new four-year contract with Miami.

On July 9, The New York Times reported that offensive lineman Seantrel Henderson, one of the top high school recruits in the nation, would attend the University of Miami in August 2010, academically cleared to play the 2010 season. Henderson previously signed a national letter of intent to join the USC Trojans. Henderson signed with the Trojans after assurances from coach Lane Kiffin that the Trojans football program would not be hit with major penalties following infractions made in previous seasons. After the NCAA penalized the Trojans in June 2010, Henderson was released from his letter of intent, allowing him to freely sign with another football program.

Senior defensive end Stephen Wesley was dismissed from the team at the end of July, reportedly for academic reasons. On August 2, junior wide receiver Thearon Collier was also dismissed due to team violations.

Miami began fall practice on August 5.

== Game summaries ==
=== Florida A&M ===
	1	2	3	4	Total
FAMU	0	0	0	0	0
#13 Miami	14	21	7	3	45

- 1st quarter
  - Leonard Hankerson 19 yard touchdown pass from Jacory Harris. Bosher PAT Good. (7-0 MIA)
  - Leonard Hankerson 40 yard touchdown pass from Jacory Harris. Bosher PAT Good. (14-0 MIA)
- 2nd quarter
  - Damien Berry 32 yard touchdown pass from Jacory Harris. Bosher PAT Good. (21-0 MIA)
  - Ray Ray Armstrong 22 yard interception return. Bosher PAT Good. (28-0 MIA)
  - Mike James 1 yard touchdown run. Bosher PAT Good. (35-0 MIA)
- 3rd quarter
  - Lamar Miller 5 yard touchdown run. Bosher PAT Good. (42-0 MIA)
- 4th quarter
  - Matt Bosher 24 yard field goal. (45-0 MIA)

=== Ohio State ===
	1	2	3	4	Total
#12 Miami	7	10	0	7	24
#2 Ohio State	3	23	10	0	36

Miami and Ohio State last played when they met in the 2003 Fiesta Bowl playing for the national championship, a game won by Ohio State in double overtime, 31–24. In 2010, Miami lost to Ohio State 36–24, but the Buckeyes' win was later vacated after an NCAA investigation of their program.

=== Pittsburgh ===
	1	2	3	4	Total
#19 Miami	7	3	7	14	31
Pittsburgh	0	0	0	3	3

Miami and Pittsburgh last met in 2003 at Pittsburgh in a game won by Miami 28–14. Miami is 21–9–1 all time against Pittsburgh.

=== Clemson ===
	1	2	3	4	Total
#17 Miami	7	20	0	3	30
Clemson	7	7	7	0	21

Miami and Clemson last met in 2009 at Miami in a game won by Clemson 40–37. Miami is 5–3 all time against Clemson.

=== Florida State ===
	1	2	3	4	Total
#24 Florida State	7	17	7	14	45
#14 Miami	0	7	10	0	17

Jermaine Thomas scored a career-high three touchdowns, all in the first 21 minutes, and Chris Thompson ended the scoring with a 90-yard touchdown run in the 4th quarter. The 90-yard run is the longest run Miami has ever allowed in the history of its football program. The 23rd ranked Seminoles enjoyed a surprisingly easy 45-17 victory. The 45 points is the second-most points Florida State has scored in the series.

=== Duke ===
	1	2	3	4	Total
Miami	0	14	14	0	28
Duke	3	0	7	3	13

Miami and Duke last met in 2009 at Miami in a game won by Miami 34–16. Miami is 6–1 all time against Duke.

=== North Carolina ===
	1	2	3	4	Total
North Carolina	3	7	0	0	10
#25 Miami	0	13	13	7	33

Miami and North Carolina last met in 2009 at Chapel Hill in a game won by North Carolina 33–24. Miami is 5–8 all time against North Carolina.

=== Virginia ===
	1	2	3	4	Total
#22 Miami	0	0	0	19	19
Virginia	0	14	3	7	24

Miami and Virginia last met in 2009 at Miami in a game won by Miami 52–17. Miami is 5–3 all time against Virginia.

=== Maryland ===
	1	2	3	4	Total
Maryland	0	17	0	3	20
Miami	6	9	3	8	26

Miami and Maryland last met in 2006 at College Park in a game won by Maryland 14–13. Miami is 7–8 all time against Maryland.

=== Georgia Tech ===
	1	2	3	4	Total
Miami	14	0	14	7	35
Georgia Tech	0	3	7	0	10

Miami and Georgia Tech last met in 2009 at Miami in a game won by Miami 33–17. Miami is 5–10 all time against Georgia Tech.

=== Virginia Tech ===
	1	2	3	4	Total
#15 Virginia Tech	7	3	7	14	31
#21 Miami	7	3	7	0	17

Miami and Virginia Tech last met in 2009 at Blacksburg in a game won by Virginia Tech 31–7. Miami is 17–10 all time against Virginia Tech.

=== South Florida ===
	1	2	3	4	OT	Total
South Florida	0	3	7	7	6	23
Miami	0	0	7	10	3	20

Miami was upset by South Florida losing to the Bulls in over time 23–20. Miami is now 2–1 all time against South Florida.

== Personnel ==
=== Roster ===
2010 Miami Hurricanes football team roster
Players
Coaches
Offense

Pos.	#	Name	Class
OL	73	Jermaine Barton	Fr
WR	3	Travis Benjamin	Jr
RB	20	Damien Berry	Sr
WR		Ben Bruneau	So
OL	79	Malcolm Bunche	Fr
WR	47	LaRon Byrd	Jr
FB	43	John Calhoun	Jr
RB	32	Lee Chambers	Jr
RB	23	Eduardo Clements	Fr
TE	82	Asante Cleveland	Fr
RB	2	Graig Cooper	Sr
OL	70	Jonathan Feliciano	Fr
OL	61	Joel Figueroa	Sr
TE	9	Chase Ford	Jr
OL	74	Orlando Franklin	Sr
TE	84	Richard Gordon	Sr
OL	66	Harland Gunn	Jr
RB	33	Maurice Hagens	Fr
RB	19	Darion Hall	Fr
WR	85	Leonard Hankerson	Sr
QB	12	Jacory Harris	Jr
OL	77	Seantrel Henderson	Fr
QB	11	A.J. Highsmith	So
FB	30	Patrick Hill	Sr
OL	63	Tyler Horn	Jr
WR	80	Allen Hurns	Fr
RB	5	Mike James	So
WR	4	Aldarius Johnson	Jr
WR	81	Davon Johnson	So
OL	78	Jermaine Johnson	Fr
RB	24	Storm Johnson	Fr
OL	55	Ben Jones	So
OL	65	Brandon Linder	Fr
OL		Eduardo Lopez	Fr
OL	62	Shane McDermott	Fr
RB	6	Lamar Miller	Fr
QB	17	Stephen Morris	Fr
TE	88	Billy Sanders	Fr
WR	86	Tommy Streeter	So
TE	87	Andrew Tallman	Fr
WR	83	Kendal Tompkins	So
FB		David Thompson	Fr
QB	89	Gustav Carson	Fr
TE	46	Clive Walford	Fr
OL	72	Brandon Washington	So
OL	75	Jared Wheeler	Fr
QB	16	Spencer Whipple	Jr
OL	71	Cory White	Fr

Defense

Pos.	#	Name	Class
DB	26	Ray-Ray Armstrong	So
DL	57	Allen Bailey	Sr
DL	91	Jeffrey Brown	Fr
LB	45	Ramon Buchanan	Jr
RB	94	Michael Vargas	Fr
DB	37	Jared Campbell	Sr
LB	39	Tyrone Cornelius	Fr
DB	18	Devont'a Davis	Fr
DL	49	Dyron Dye	Fr
DL	99	Marcus Fortson	So
LB	58	Jordan Futch	Jr
LB	59	James Gaines	Fr
DB		Nathan Gholston	So
LB	69	Sean Goldstein	So
LB	51	Shayon Green	Fr
DL	95	Gavin Hardin	So
DB	1	Brandon Harris	Jr
DB	13	Ryan Hill	Sr
DB	29	Joshua Livesley	Fr
DL	92	Josh Holmes	Sr
LB	34	C.J. Holton	So
DL	98	Jeremy Lewis	Jr
LB		Erik Lichter	So
LB	44	Colin McCarthy	Sr
DB	21	Brandon McGee	So
DB	38	Cory Nelms	Sr
LB	52	Kevin Nelson	Fr
DB	29	JoJo Nicolas	Jr
DL	97	Adewale Ojomo	Jr
DB	24	Cobie Okafor	Fr
LB	53	Levi Paalua	So
DB	29	Keion Payne	Fr
DL	96	Curtis Porter	So
DL	54	Micanor Regis	Jr
DB	15	Jamal Reid	Fr
LB	36	Kylan Robinson	Sr
DL	93	Luther Robinson	Fr
DL	56	Marcus Robinson	Jr
DB	22	Kacy Rodgers	Fr
DL	48	Andrew Smith	Jr
LB	31	Sean Spence	Jr
DB	7	Vaughn Telemaque	So
DB	16	James Klein	So
DB	8	DeMarcus Van Dyke	Sr
DL	35	Olivier Vernon	So
LB	41	Travis Williams	Fr

Special teams

Pos.	#	Name	Class
P/K	25	Matt Bosher	Sr
LS	60	Chris Ivory	Jr
K	40	Jake Wieclaw	So

Head coach

- Randy Shannon

Coordinators/assistant coaches

- Mark Whipple – Assistant head coach/offensive coordinator/quarterbacks
- John Lovett – Defensive coordinator
- Michael Barrow – Linebackers
- Mike Cassano – Running backs
- Aubrey Hill – Wide receivers
- Wesley McGriff – Defensive backs
- Joe Pannunzio – Tight ends/special teams
- Rick Petri – Defensive line
- Jeff Stoutland – Offensive line

Legend

- (C) Team captain
- (S) Suspended
- (I) Ineligible
- Injured
- Redshirt

Roster
Last update: January 2, 2011

=== Depth chart ===
(prior to Game 12 versus South Florida)

Defense

FS
Vaughn Telemaque
Jared Campbell
⋅

WLB	MLB	SLB
⋅	Colin McCarthy	⋅
Jordan Futch	Kelvin Cain	⋅
James Gaines	⋅	⋅

SS
JoJo Nicolas
Ray-Ray Armstrong
⋅

CB
Ryan Hill
DeMarcus Van Dyke
⋅

DE	DT	DT	DE
Adewale Ojomo	Marcus Forston	Micanor Regis	Allen Bailey
Olivier Vernon	Josh Holmes	Luther Robinson	Marcus Robinson
Andrew Smith	⋅	⋅	⋅

CB
Brandon Harris
Brandon McGee
⋅

Offense

WR
Leonard Hankerson
Aldarius Johnson
⋅

LT	LG	C	RG	RT
Orlando Franklin	Harland Gunn	Tyler Horn	Brandon Washington	Seantrel Henderson
Ben Jones	Brandon Linder	Brandon Linder	Harland Gunn	Jermaine Johnson
⋅	⋅	⋅	⋅	⋅

TE
Richard Gordon
Asante Cleveland
Chase Ford

WR
Travis Benjamin
LaRon Byrd
⋅

QB
Jacory Harris
Stephen Morris
⋅

RB
Damien Berry
Lamar Miller
Michael Vargas

FB
Patrick Hill
Mike James
⋅

Special teams
PK Matt Bosher
P Matt Bosher
KR Storm Johnson
PR Travis Benjamin
LS Chris Ivory
H Spencer Whipple

=== Recruiting class ===
Player	Position	Height	Weight	Hometown	High School/Prep School/Junior College
Latwan Anderson	Safety	5-10	185	Cleveland, OH	Glenville HS
Jermaine Barton	Offensive Lineman	6-6	270	Ft. Lauderdale, FL	St. Thomas Aquinas
Jeffrey Brown	Defensive tackle	6-3	275	Evanston, IL	Evanston HS
Malcolm Bunche	Offensive Lineman	6-6	325	Newark, DE	Newark HS/Milford Academy
Kelvin Cain	Linebacker	6-4	210	Clovis, CA	Buchanan HS
Eduardo Clements	Running back	5-10	185	Miami, FL	Booker T Washington HS
Asante-Jabari Cleveland	Tight end	6-5	230	Sacramento, CA	Christian Brothers HS
Tyrone Cornelius	Linebacker	6-2	195	Stone Mountain, GA	Stephenson HS
Devont'a Davis	Defensive back	6-2	180	Gainesville, FL	Gainesville HS
Jeremy Davis	Corner Back	5-11	162	Ft. Myers, FL	Ft. Myers HS
Johnathan Feliciano	Offensive Tackle	6-4	283	Davie, FL	Western HS
Chase Ford	Tight end	6-6	245	Kilgore, TX	Kilgore J.C.
James Gaines	Linebacker	6-3	205	Buffalo, NY	Canisius HS
Tavadis Glenn	Offensive Tackle	6-5	265	Jacksonville, FL	Terry Parker HS
Maurice Hagens	Fullback	6-1	235	Tampa, FL	Tampa Bay Tech HS
Darion Hall	Running back	6-1	200	Naples, FL	Lely HS
Seantrel Henderson	Offensive Tackle	6-8	340	Saint Paul, MN	Cretin-Derham Hall
Allen Hurns	Wide receiver	6-2	175	Miami, FL	Carol City HS
Storm Johnson	Runningback	6-1	217	Loganville, GA	Loganville HS
Brandon Linder	Offensive Lineman	6-6	290	Ft. Lauderdale, FL	St. Thomas Aquinas
Shane McDermott	Center	6-3	266	Wellington, FL	Palm Beach Central HS
Stephen Morris	Quarterback	6-2	186	Miami Shores, FL	Monsignor Pace HS
Kevin Nelson	Linebacker	6-1	220	Gainesville, FL	Gainesville HS
Cobie Okafor	Corner Back	5-10	180	Miami, FL	Booker T Washington HS
Keion Payne	Corner Back	6-0	165	Ft. Lauderdale, FL	St. Thomas Aquinas
David Perry	Defensive end	6-6	230	Ft. Lauderdale, FL	University School HS
Kacy Rodgers	Corner Back	6-2	185	Southlake, TX	Carroll HS
Andrew Tallman	Tight end	6-5	237	Dorchester, MA	Boston College HS
Delmar Taylor	Defensive tackle	6-4	265	Miami Beach, FL	Miami Beach HS
Clive Walford	Tight end	6-6	225	Belle Glade, FL	Glades Central HS
Travis Williams	Linebacker	6-2	189	Norfolk, VA	Monsignor Pace HS

== Shannon fired, Al Golden hired ==
Head coach Randy Shannon was fired the day following the South Florida loss.

On December 12, 2010, ESPN reported that Miami had offered the new head coaching position to former Temple University head coach Al Golden.

In press-conference remarks upon his hiring on December 13, 2010, Golden emphasized the importance of the Miami legacy. "It's the most recognizable brand in college football," he said; "I go back to the former players that are here, the five national championships, 20 national award winners, countless All-Americans, incredible tradition; it's a dream job."

Golden also announced after the bowl game that offensive coordinator Mark Whipple would not be retained and his replacement could come from the NFL.
