= Heeps =

Heeps is a surname. Notable people with the surname include:

- Andrew Heeps (1899-1981), Scottish footballer
- Cameron Heeps (born 1995), Australian speedway rider
- Debbie Heeps (born 1955), Canadian volleyball player
- Rod Heeps (1938-2002), New Zealand rugby union player

== See also ==
- Heep (surname)
