= Jake Heaps =

American gridiron football player (born 1991)

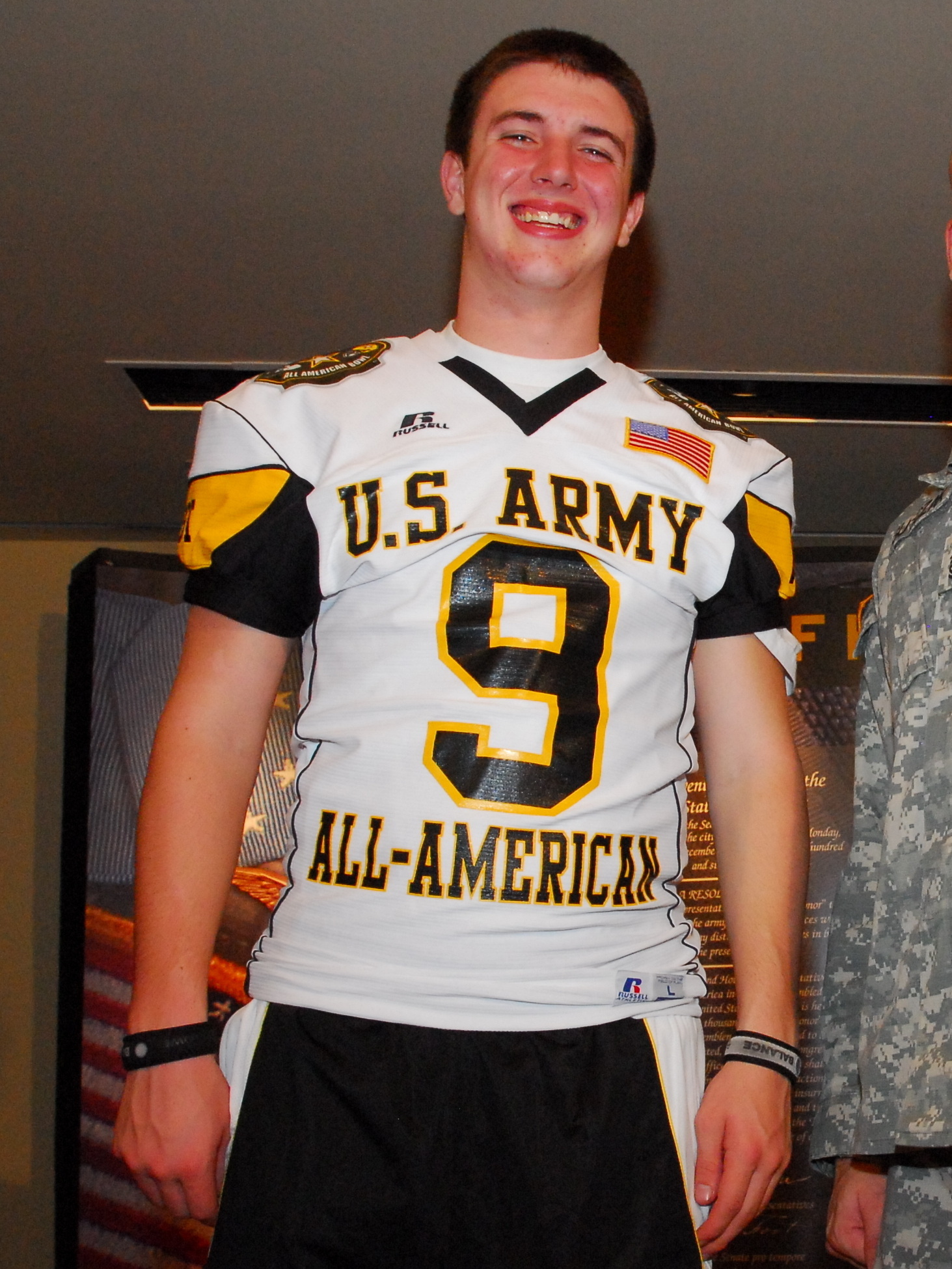
- Heaps in 2010

No. 3, 12
- Position: Quarterback

Personal information
- Born: June 19, 1991 (age 35); Issaquah, Washington, U.S.
- Listed height: 6 ft 1 in (1.85 m)
- Listed weight: 208 lb (94 kg)

Career information
- High school: Skyline (Sammamish, Washington)
- College: BYU (2010-2011); Kansas (2012-2013); Miami (FL) (2014)
- NFL draft: 2015: undrafted

Career history
- New York Jets (2015)*; Seattle Seahawks (2016)*; Saskatchewan Roughriders (2017)*; Seattle Seahawks (2017)*; BC Lions (2017)*
- * Offseason or practice squad member only

Jake Heaps (born June 19, 1991) is an American former football quarterback. He was signed by the New York Jets as an undrafted free agent in 2015. Heaps played for three universities during his collegiate career including Miami (FL), Kansas and Brigham Young.

== Early life ==
Heaps attended Skyline High School in Sammamish, Washington, and played as a quarterback for their football team. He led the football team to the 3A Washington state title in 2007 and 4A titles in 2008 and 2009. During those three years he passed for a combined 9196 yards and 114 touchdowns, the bulk of those touchdowns to Gino Simone and Kasen Williams.

After his senior season at Skyline in 2009, Heaps signed a letter of intent to play college football at Brigham Young University (BYU). Despite the fact that BYU was his parents' desired school, Heaps wanted to play for the University of Washington. Coming out of high school, Heaps was the number one rated high school quarterback in the country according to the recruiting services Scout.com and Rivals.com. Heaps was also named as top quarterback on the Parade All-America Team and was invited to play in the U.S. Army All-American Bowl.

Some recruiting analysts felt that his poise, judgment, and throwing accuracy, would be a good fit in the Cougars' spread offense.

== College career ==
=== Brigham Young University ===
Heaps began his freshman season sharing time with starting quarterback Riley Nelson. After Nelson was injured against Florida State, Heaps led the Cougars the rest of the season to six wins and four losses. He improved as the season progressed and had only a single loss in his last six games, to 20th-ranked University of Utah. He surpassed Ty Detmer's freshman touchdown record that stood for 22 years with 15 touchdowns. In the month of November and the December bowl game, Heaps threw 13 touchdowns and two interceptions and passed for 1,259 yards. He was the first freshman quarterback to ever lead the Cougars in Brigham Young's 29 bowl game appearances. Heaps was named the New Mexico Bowl's Most Valuable Player, breaking some of the bowl's records after leading BYU to a comfortable victory with a quarterback rating of 122.5 throwing 4 touchdowns with 1 interception. As a true freshman, Heaps threw for 2,316 yards, 15 touchdowns, and 9 interceptions with a quarterback rating of 116.2. He completed 219 passes on 383 attempts with a completion percentage of 57.2%.

During the 2011 season, Heaps started the Cougars' first five games. During those first five games, Heaps threw 3 touchdowns and 5 interceptions and failed to garner a QB rating higher than 116.3 or complete a pass greater than 37 yards. After a horrendous 29.3 QB rating during a 44-point home loss against the University of Utah, he was benched during the fifth game, in which backup quarterback Riley Nelson led BYU to a come-from-behind victory. Heaps saw limited action until Nelson was injured during a game against the University of Idaho. Heaps finished the game against Idaho, and started the next game against New Mexico State, but was replaced when Nelson was cleared to play the following week. Heaps ended the 2011 season with a completion percentage of 57.1, 9 touchdowns, 8 interceptions, and a QB rating of 111.0. After the December 3 game against Hawaii, Heaps announced that he would not travel with the team to the Armed Forces Bowl game, but would instead be seeking to transfer schools.

=== University of Kansas ===
Following BYU's 2011 season Heaps announced he would be transferring to the University of Kansas to play for new head coach Charlie Weis. Due to NCAA transfer rules, Heaps redshirted for the 2012 season. He was expected to compete for the starting quarterback position at Kansas with Michael Cummings.

Heaps struggled with Kansas, completing fewer than half of his passes. He lost the starting quarterback job to Montell Cozart during an open competition. On June 13, 2014, the University of Kansas announced Heaps was leaving the program to transfer to another school.

=== University of Miami ===
Heaps transferred to the University of Miami to play for the Miami Hurricanes football team in June 2014. Brad Kaaya, a true freshman, beat Heaps in the competition to start at quarterback for Miami. He appeared in three games for the Hurricanes, going 6-for-12 on passing attempts for a total of 51 yards.

=== College statistics ===
Year	Team	Games			Passing								Rushing			
Year	Team	GP	GS	Record	Cmp	Att	Pct	Yds	Avg	TD	INT	Rtg	Att	Yds	Avg	TD
2010	BYU	13	10	6–4	219	383	57.2	2,316	6.0	15	9	116.2	34	-100	-2.9	1
2011	BYU	9	6	4–2	144	252	57.1	1,452	5.8	9	8	111.0	14	-57	-4.1	1
2012	Kansas	Redshirt (redshirt)														
2013	Kansas	11	9	2–7	128	261	49.0	1,414	5.4	8	10	97.0	40	-162	-4.1	1
2014	Miami	6	0	—	6	12	50.0	51	4.3	0	0	85.7	3	-10	-3.3	0
Career		39	25	12–13	497	908	54.7	5,233	5.8	32	27	108.8	91	-329	-3.6	3

== Professional career ==
Heaps was rated the 43rd best quarterback in the 2015 NFL draft by NFLDraftScout.com.

Pre-draft measurables
Height	Weight	Arm length	Hand span	Wingspan	40-yard dash	10-yard split	20-yard split	20-yard shuttle	Three-cone drill	Vertical jump	Broad jump	Bench press
6 ft 1 in (1.85 m)	217 lb (98 kg)	30 1/4 in (0.77 m)	9 1/2 in (0.24 m)	6 ft 1 3/4 in (1.87 m)	5.08 s	1.79 s	2.98 s	4.34 s	6.99 s	30.5 in (0.77 m)	8 ft 10 in (2.69 m)	11 reps
All values from Kansas and Miami Pro Day

=== New York Jets ===
Heaps was signed by the New York Jets on May 11, 2015. He was released on August 27, 2015.

=== Seattle Seahawks (first stint) ===
Heaps was signed by the Seattle Seahawks on May 2, 2016. On September 3, 2016, he was released by the Seahawks as part of final roster cuts. He was signed back onto the Seahawks' practice squad on September 13, 2016. He was released on October 3, 2016.

=== Saskatchewan Roughriders ===
Heaps was signed by the Saskatchewan Roughriders on April 25, 2017. He was later released by the Roughriders so he could sign with the Seahawks.

=== Seattle Seahawks (second stint) ===
On May 2, 2017, Heaps re-signed with the Seahawks. He was waived on June 5, 2017.

=== BC Lions ===
On July 24, 2017, Heaps was signed to the practice roster of the BC Lions of the CFL. He was released on August 8, 2017, being an emergency practice squad quarterback.

== Coaching career ==
On June 19, 2022, Heaps left his radio show to become Russell Wilson’s full-time quarterback coach. On February 5, 2025, Heaps was announced as the new head football coach at Legend High School in Parker, Colorado.

== Personal life ==
Heaps is a member of the Church of Jesus Christ of Latter-day Saints. His parents, Steve and Kelly, now divorced, supported his career by moving him into the Issaquah School district so he could learn the "Skyline system" under coach Steve Gervais. He has one older sister, Brittany, who is a dental hygienist in Utah. Steve played college baseball at BYU.

Heaps is married to Brooke, whom he met at BYU. They were married during his sophomore year at BYU.

Until June 2022, Jake was a contributor and radio personality on 710 ESPN, now Seattle Sports 710.
