= Heap =

Heap, Heaps, or HEAP may refer to:

== Computing and mathematics ==
- Heap (data structure), a data structure commonly used to implement a priority queue
- Heap (mathematics), a generalization of a group
- Heap memory (or free store), an area of memory for dynamic memory allocation
- Heap, the subject of the Sorites paradox

== Other uses ==
- Heap (surname)
- Heaps (surname)
- Heaps, the structures used in heap leaching, an industrial mining process
- Heap (comics), a golden-age comic book character
- Heap, Bury, a former district in England
- "The Heap" (Fargo), a 2014 television episode
- High Explosive, Armor-Piercing, ammunition and ordnance
- Holocaust Education and Avoidance Pod, an idea in Neal Stephenson's novel Cryptonomicon
- Heap, a translation of Skandha, a concept in Buddhist phenomenology

== See also ==
- Heapey, a village and civil parish of the Borough of Chorley, in Lancashire, England
- Pile (disambiguation)
