= Heep =

Heep is a surname. Notable people with the surname include:

- Danny Heep (born 1957), retired Major League Baseball outfielder
- Franz Heep (1902–1978), German-Brazilian architect
- Maria Heep-Altiner (born 1959), German mathematician, actuary and university lecturer
- Sally Heep, fictional attorney on the American television series Boston Legal
- Uriah Heep, fictional character created by Charles Dickens in his novel David Copperfield

== See also ==
- CCC Heep Woh College (中華基督教會協和書院), a secondary school in Tsz Wan Shan of Hong Kong
- Heep Yunn School (協恩中學), an Anglican girls' secondary school in Ma Tau Wai, Kowloon, Hong Kong
- The Great Heep, 48-minute, animated television special that aired on June 7, 1986
- Uriah Heep (band), English hard rock band
- Heap (disambiguation)
- Heeps (surname)
