= Joseph Yearby =

American football running back

Joe Yearby
Profile
- Position: Running back

Personal information
- Born: Miami, Florida, U.S.
- Listed height: 5 ft 9 in (1.75 m)
- Listed weight: 200 lb (91 kg)

Career information
- High school: West Little River (FL) Miami Central
- College: Miami (FL)
- NFL draft: 2017: undrafted

Career history
- Orlando Apollos (2019)

Awards and highlights
- Third team All-ACC (2015)

Joseph "Joe" Yearby is an American former professional football running back. He played college football at the University of Miami. He was a backup to running back Duke Johnson as a freshman, but started in his sophomore year. In his sophomore year, he became just the ninth player from the University of Miami to surpass 1,000 yards in a season.

== College career ==
Yearby was a 4-Star recruit coming out of Miami Central High School. He committed to Miami on February 26, 2013.

=== College statistics ===
			Rushing				Receiving		
Year	Team	GP	Att	Yards	Avg	TDs	Rec	Yards	TDs
2014	Miami	12	86	509	5.9	1	8	118	1
2015	Miami	13	205	1,002	4.9	6	23	273	2
2016	Miami	12	99	592	6.0	7	10	65	0
College totals		37	390	2,103	5.4	14	41	456	3

Yearby played in 12 games in his Freshman year, rushed for 509 yards in 86 carries for 1 touchdown and also caught 8 passes for 119 yards and a touchdown. In his sophomore year he played in 13 games rushing for 1,002 yards and 6 touchdowns also added 23 receptions for 273 yards and 3 touchdowns. He was named to the third-team All-ACC after his 2015 campaign.

Following the completion of his junior season, on January 3, 2017, the University of Miami announced that Yearby would forego his Senior season to enter the 2017 NFL draft.

== Professional career ==
On August 1, 2018, Yearby was signed by the Orlando Apollos of the Alliance of American Football, for what has been described as a "brief stint". In 2019, he was cut from the Apollos roster and went on to figure in the roster of the National Gridiron League team, St. Louis Stampede (Camp only). In 2020, he appeared in the draft pool of the XFL and with the team Wichita Force (Camp only).
