= 2014 Independence Bowl =

2014 Duck Commander Independence Bowl
- 39th Independence Bowl
Miami Hurricanes	South Carolina Gamecocks
(6–6)	(6–6)
ACC	SEC
21	24
Head coach: Al Golden	Head coach: Steve Spurrier
	1	2	3	4	Total
Miami	3	3	8	7	21
South Carolina	0	17	0	7	24
- Date: December 27, 2014
- Season: 2014
- Stadium: Independence Stadium
- Location: Shreveport, Louisiana
- MVP: South Carolina WR Pharoh Cooper
- Favorite: Miami by 3
- National anthem: Missy Robertson
- Referee: Jack Folliard (Pac-12)
- Attendance: 38,242
- Payout: US$1,200,000

United States TV coverage
- Network: ABC/Sports USA
- Announcers: Dave Neal, Andre Ware, & Laura Rutledge (ABC); Eli Gold & Charles Arbuckle (Sports USA)

The 2014 Independence Bowl was a college football bowl game played on December 27, 2014, at Independence Stadium in Shreveport, Louisiana, in the United States. The 39th annual Independence Bowl, it pitted the Miami Hurricanes of the Atlantic Coast Conference against the South Carolina Gamecocks of the Southeastern Conference. The game started at 3:30 p.m. CST and aired on ABC. It was one of the 2014–15 bowl games that concluded the 2014 FBS football season. Sponsored by duck call manufacturer Duck Commander, the game was officially known as the Duck Commander Independence Bowl.

South Carolina defeated Miami by a score of 24–21, winning their fourth consecutive bowl game, a school record.

== Teams ==
The game featured the Miami Hurricanes of the Atlantic Coast Conference against the South Carolina Gamecocks of the Southeastern Conference.

This was the 16th overall meeting between these two teams, with Miami leading the series 8–5–2 going into the game. The last time these two teams met was in 1987.

=== Miami (Florida) ===
After finishing their regular season with a 6–6 record, the Hurricanes accepted their invitation to play in the game.

This was Miami's first Independence Bowl.

=== South Carolina ===
After finishing their regular season with a 6–6 record, the Gamecocks accepted their invitation to play in the game.

This was South Carolina's second Independence Bowl; the Gamecocks previously played in the 2005 game, with the 2005 South Carolina squad losing to the Missouri Tigers by a score of 38–31.

== Game summary ==
=== Scoring summary ===
Scoring summary

Quarter	Time	Drive			Team	Scoring information	Score	
Quarter	Time	Plays	Yards	TOP	Team	Scoring information	MIA	SC
1	7:56	11	65	5:06	MIA	27-yard field goal by Michael Badgley	3	0
2	13:27	12	69	5:32	MIA	26-yard field goal by Michael Badgley	6	0
2	7:50	2	78	0:20	SC	Pharoh Cooper 78-yard touchdown reception from Dylan Thompson, Elliott Fry kick good	6	7
2	5:25	6	53	1:33	SC	Mike Davis 15-yard touchdown reception from Dylan Thompson, Elliott Fry kick good	6	14
2	1:39	9	41	3:40	SC	32-yard field goal by Elliott Fry	6	17
3	1:43	10	93	5:23	MIA	Gus Edwards 3-yard touchdown run, 2-point pass good	14	17
4	4:13	3	29	1:11	SC	Dylan Thompson 2-yard touchdown run, Elliott Fry kick good	14	24
4	2:16	7	72	1:57	MIA	Phillip Dorsett 11-yard touchdown reception from Brad Kaaya, Michael Badgley kick good	21	24
"TOP" = time of possession. For other American football terms, see Glossary of American football.							21	24

=== Statistics ===
Statistics	MIA	SC
First downs	21	16
Plays–yards	73–422	64–354
Rushes–yards	40–186	30–60
Passing yards	236	294
Passing: Comp–Att–Int	19–33–1	22–34–0
Time of possession	31:10	28:50
