= Elizabeth Heaps =

Elizabeth Heaps is an English university administrator and academic at the University of York, who has been Pro-Vice-Chancellor there since October 2007, one of the four key positions which support the university's Vice-Chancellor. Her duties include responsibility for Estates and Strategic Projects, including the growth of the campus agreed on its Heslington East site.

She was Head of the University Library from 1997, where her role included responsibility for the Borthwick Institute for Archives, one of the biggest British archive repositories, particularly for ecclesiastical material. Founded in 1957, the Institute holds archives from all around the world, from the 12th century to the present day.

She was elected to the University Council in 1999, and has sat on the Council since then. Within the university she is also a member of Court, Planning Committee, Senate, Information Committee and the Strategic Information Projects Implementation Group.

As a qualified professional librarian, she is a senior participant in a variety of national and regional organisations in the field of information and libraries, including the Joint Information Systems Committee (JISC), Society of College, National and University Libraries (SCONUL), and the Yorkshire Museums, Libraries and Archives Council.

Elizabeth Heaps has degrees in French and in Medieval studies.
