= 2014 Miami Hurricanes football team =

American college football season

2014 Miami Hurricanes football

Independence Bowl, L 21–24 vs. South Carolina
- Conference: Atlantic Coast Conference
- Coastal Division
- Record: 6–7 (3–5 ACC)
- Head coach: Al Golden (4th season)
- Offensive coordinator: James Coley (2nd season)
- Offensive scheme: Multiple pro-style
- Defensive coordinator: Mark D'Onofrio (4th season)
- Base defense: Multiple 4–3
- Home stadium: Sun Life Stadium

2014 Atlantic Coast Conference football standings
| | Conf. | | | Overall |
| Team | W | | L | W | | L |
|---|---|---|---|---|---|---|
Atlantic Division
| No. T–5 Florida State x$^ | 8 | – | 0 | 13 | – | 1 |
| No. 15 Clemson | 6 | – | 2 | 10 | – | 3 |
| No. 24 Louisville | 5 | – | 3 | 9 | – | 4 |
| Boston College | 4 | – | 4 | 7 | – | 6 |
| NC State | 3 | – | 5 | 8 | – | 5 |
| Syracuse | 1 | – | 7 | 3 | – | 9 |
| Wake Forest | 1 | – | 7 | 3 | – | 9 |
Coastal Division
| No. 8 Georgia Tech x | 6 | – | 2 | 11 | – | 3 |
| Duke | 5 | – | 3 | 9 | – | 4 |
| North Carolina | 4 | – | 4 | 6 | – | 7 |
| Pittsburgh | 4 | – | 4 | 6 | – | 7 |
| Miami (FL) | 3 | – | 5 | 6 | – | 7 |
| Virginia Tech | 3 | – | 5 | 7 | – | 6 |
| Virginia | 3 | – | 5 | 5 | – | 7 |
Championship: Florida State 37, Georgia Tech 35
^ – College Football Playoff participant; $ – Conference champion; x – Division champion/co-champions; Rankings from AP Poll

The 2014 Miami Hurricanes football team represented the University of Miami during the 2014 NCAA Division I FBS football season. It was the Hurricanes' 89th season of football and 11th as a member of the Atlantic Coast Conference. The Hurricanes were led by fourth-year head coach Al Golden and played their home games at Sun Life Stadium. They finished the season 6–7 overall and 3–5 in the ACC to finish in a three-way tie for fifth place in the Coastal Division. They were invited to the Independence Bowl where they lost to South Carolina, 24–21.

== Personnel ==
=== Coaching staff ===
| Name | Position | Seasons | Alma mater |
|---|---|---|---|
| Al Golden | Head coach | 4th | Penn State (1991) |
| Mark D'Onofrio | Assistant head coach/defensive coordinator | 4th | Penn State (1991) |
| James Coley | Offensive coordinator/quarterbacks | 2nd | Florida State (1997) |
| Jethro Franklin | Senior defensive assistant/defensive line | 4th | Fresno State (1989) |
| Hurlie Brown | Linebackers/Florida recruiting coordinator | 2nd | Miami (1992) |
| Brennan Carroll | Wide receivers/national recruiting coordinator | 4th | Pittsburgh (2001) |
| Art Kehoe | Offensive line | 25th | Miami (1982) |
| Paul Williams | Defensive backs | 4th | Delaware (1996) |
| Larry Scott | Tight ends | 2nd | South Florida (2000) |
| Tim Harris | Running backs | 1st | Carthage |

=== Support staff ===
| Name | Position | Seasons | Alma mater |
|---|---|---|---|
| Kareem Brown | Graduate assistant | | |
| Derron Montgomery | Graduate assistant | | |
| Chris O'Hara | Graduate assistant | | |
| Cole Pemberton | Graduate assistant | | |

=== Roster ===
As of May 2014

2014 Miami Hurricanes football team roster
Players
Coaches
Offense

| Pos. | # | Name | Class |
|---|---|---|---|
| OT | 78 | Raphael Akpejiori | Sr |
| OL | 77 | Adam Arnaout | Fr |
| WR | 83 | Braxton Berrios | Fr |
| WR | 82 | Tyre Brady | Fr |
| TE | 45 | Isai Cetoute | Jr |
| WR | 3 | Stacy Coley | So |
| QB | 13 | Gray Crow | So |
| OL | 73 | Trevor Darling | Fr |
| TE | 5 | Standish Dobard | So |
| WR | 4 | Phillip Dorsett | Sr |
| RB | 7 | Gus Edwards | So |
| G | 70 | Jon Feliciano | Sr |
| OT | 74 | Ereck Flowers | Jr |
| OT | 76 | Taylor Gadbois | So |
| G | 67 | Alex Gall | So |
| OL | 79 | Justin Goldberg | Fr |
| WR | 84 | Greg Golden | Fr |
| FB | 40 | Matt Golden | Fr |
| RB/WR | | Trayone Gray | Fr |
| OL | 69 | Tyler Grimsley | Fr |
| OL | 75 | Sean Harvey | Sr |
| QB | 16 | Jake Heaps | Sr |
| TE | 23 | Chris Herndon IV | Fr |
| QB | 17 | Isaac Hoza | Fr |
| G | 63 | Danny Isidora | So |
| OL | 65 | Sterling Jackson | Fr |
| RB | 30 | De'Andre Johnson | Sr |
| RB | 8 | Duke Johnson | Jr |
| WR | 21 | Josh Johnson | Fr |
| WR | | D'Mauri Jones | So |
| QB | 15 | Brad Kaaya | Fr |
| QB | 13 | Colin Feller | Fr |
| WR | 87 | Garrett Kidd | Jr |
| C/OG | 54 | Hunter Knighton (injured) | Fr |
| WR | | Darrell Langham | Fr |
| WR | 9 | Malcolm Lewis | So |
| C | 68 | Nick Linder | Fr |
| WR | 31 | Malik Mayweather | Fr |
| OT | 52 | K. C. McDermott | Fr |
| C | 62 | Shane McDermott | Sr |
| WR | 86 | David Njoku | Fr |
| TE | 88 | Jake O'Donnell | So |
| FB | 43 | Tyler Odems | So |
| OT | 66 | Sunny Odogwu | Fr |
| FB | 39 | Ronald Regula | Sr |
| WR | 38 | Joseph Rodgers | Jr |
| QB | 12 | Malik Rosier | Fr |
| TE | 85 | Beau Sandland | Sr |
| WR | 80 | Rashawn Scott | Sr |
| WR | 24 | Stephen Sweeney | Jr |
| FB/RB | 44 | Walter Tucker | So |
| TE | 46 | Clive Walford | Sr |
| WR | 6 | Herb Waters | Jr |
| QB | 18 | Michael Welch | Fr |
| G | 64 | Hunter Wells | Jr |
| QB | 11 | Ryan Williams (injured) | Sr |
| RB | 2 | Joseph Yearby | Fr |

Defense

| Pos. | # | Name | Class |
|---|---|---|---|
| OLB | 34 | Thurston Armbrister | Jr |
| DT | 55 | Joe Brown | Fr |
| CB | 1 | Artie Burns | So |
| S | 2 | Deon Bush | Jr |
| S | 6 | Jamal Carter | So |
| DE | 71 | Anthony Chickillo | Sr |
| CB | 41 | Wyatt Chickillo | Fr |
| CB | 21 | Antonio Crawford | Jr |
| S | 25 | Dallas Crawford | Jr |
| S | 48 | Hugo Delapenha Jr. | Sr |
| CB | 35 | Nate Dortch | So |
| CB | 29 | Corn Elder | So |
| S | 28 | Nantambu-Akil Fentress | Sr |
| S | 7 | Marques Gayot | Fr |
| ILB | 53 | Jared Goldenberg | Fr |
| ILB | 5 | Jermaine Grace | So |
| CB | 37 | Ladarius Gunter | Sr |
| DE/DT | 99 | Jelani Hamilton | Jr |
| DE/OLB | 33 | Trent Harris | Fr |
| S | 22 | Kiy Hester | Fr |
| DT | 93 | Calvin Heurtelou | Jr |
| CB | 3 | Tracy Howard | Jr |
| DE/OLB | 44 | Demetrius Jackson | Fr |
| DT | 92 | Courtel Jenkins | Fr |
| S | 26 | Rayshawn Jenkins | Jr |
| DE/DT | 47 | Ufomba Kamalu | Jr |
| DT | 90 | Corey King | Jr |
| ILB | 56 | Raphael Kirby | Jr |
| CB | 20 | Ray Lewis III | Fr |
| CB | 27 | Ryan Mayes | Fr |
| DE/OLB | 17 | Tyriq McCord | Jr |
| ILB | 50 | Terry McCray | Fr |
| DT | 72 | Earl Moore | Jr |
| DT/DE | 95 | Anthony Moten | Fr |
| DE/OLB | 98 | Al-Quadin Muhammad | So |
| DE | 94 | Anthony Naser | Jr |
| OLB | 58 | Darrion Owens | Fr |
| OLB | 52 | Denzel Perryman | Sr |
| DT | 91 | Olsen Pierre | Sr |
| S | 44 | Dominic Sicilian | So |
| DE/OLB | 57 | Mike Smith | Fr |
| DE | 9 | Chad Thomas | Fr |
| S | 38 | Jordan Tolson | Sr |
| DT | 11 | Michael Wyche | Jr |
| ILB | 51 | Juwon Young | Fr |

Special teams

| Pos. | # | Name | Class |
|---|---|---|---|
| K | 48 | Josh Bacon | Fr |
| K/P | 24 | Michael Badgley | Fr |
| P | 27 | Ricky Carroll | Sr |
| P/K | 40 | Grant Coffman | Fr |
| LS | 55 | Frank Gabriel | So |
| K | 18 | Matt Goudis | Jr |
| K/P | 49 | Aaron Martinez | So |
| K | 43 | Jon Semerene | Fr |
| P | 16 | Justin Vogel | So |

Head coach

- Al Golden (4th year) – Head Coach/special teams coordinator

Coordinators/assistant coaches

- Mark D'Onofrio – Assistant Head Coach/defensive coordinator
- James Coley – Offensive coordinator/quarterbacks
- Jethro Franklin – Senior Defensive Assistant/defensive line
- Larry Scott – Tight ends
- Hurlie Brown – Linebackers/Florida Recruiting coordinator
- Art Kehoe – Offensive line
- Brennan Carroll – Wide receivers/National Recruiting coordinator
- Paul Williams – Defensive backs
- Tim "Ice" Harris – Running backs
- Kareem Brown – Grad. Asst. Defensive tackles
- Derron Montgomery – Grad. Asst. Slot Receivers
- Chris O'Hara – Grad. Asst. Cornerbacks
- Cole Pemberton – Grad. Asst. Offensive line

Legend

- (C) Team captain
- (S) Suspended
- (I) Ineligible
- Injured
- Redshirt

Roster

== Recruiting ==
=== Position key ===
| Back | B | Center | C | Cornerback | CB | Defensive back | DB |
| Defensive end | DE | Defensive lineman | DL | Defensive tackle | DT | End | E |
| Fullback | FB | Guard | G | Halfback | HB | Kicker | K |
| Kickoff returner | KR | Offensive tackle | OT | Offensive lineman | OL | Linebacker | LB |
| Long snapper | LS | Punter | P | Punt returner | PR | Quarterback | QB |
| Running back | RB | Safety | S | Tight end | TE | Wide receiver | WR |

=== Recruits ===
College recruiting information (2014)
| Name | Hometown | School | Height | Weight | 40^{‡} | Commit date |
|---|---|---|---|---|---|---|
| Braxton Berrios; WR | Raleigh, NC | Leesville Road HS | 5 ft 9 in (1.75 m) | 181 lb (82 kg) | 4.5 | Oct 12, 2013 |
| Braxton Berrios; WR | Recruit ratings: Scout: Rivals: 247Sports: ESPN: | | | | | |
| Tyre Brady; WR | Homestead, FL | South Dade HS | 6 ft 3 in (1.91 m) | 193 lb (88 kg) | N/A | Nov 15, 2013 |
| Tyre Brady; WR | Recruit ratings: Scout: Rivals: 247Sports: ESPN: | | | | | |
| Trevor Darling; OG | Miami, FL | Miami Central HS | 6 ft 5 in (1.96 m) | 330 lb (150 kg) | 5.7 | Apr 4, 2012 |
| Trevor Darling; OG | Recruit ratings: Scout: Rivals: 247Sports: ESPN: | | | | | |
| Marques Gayot; S | Lake Worth, FL | Park Vista Community HS | 6 ft 1 in (1.85 m) | 203 lb (92 kg) | 4.6 | Dec 13, 2013 |
| Marques Gayot; S | Recruit ratings: Scout: Rivals: 247Sports: ESPN: | | | | | |
| Trayone Gray; ATH | Miami, FL | Miami Carol City HS | 6 ft 2 in (1.88 m) | 210 lb (95 kg) | N/A | Jun 23, 2013 |
| Trayone Gray; ATH | Recruit ratings: Scout: Rivals: 247Sports: ESPN: | | | | | |
| Trent Harris; DE | Winter Park, FL | Winter Park HS | 6 ft 2 in (1.88 m) | 231 lb (105 kg) | N/A | Jul 29, 2013 |
| Trent Harris; DE | Recruit ratings: Scout: Rivals: 247Sports: ESPN: | | | | | |
| Chris Herndon; TE | Norcross, GA | Norcross HS | 6 ft 4 in (1.93 m) | 225 lb (102 kg) | 4.7 | Jun 22, 2013 |
| Chris Herndon; TE | Recruit ratings: Scout: Rivals: 247Sports: ESPN: | | | | | |
| Kiy Hester; S | Wayne, NJ | De Paul Catholic HS | 6 ft 1 in (1.85 m) | 201 lb (91 kg) | N/A | Dec 15, 2013 |
| Kiy Hester; S | Recruit ratings: Scout: Rivals: 247Sports: ESPN: | | | | | |
| Calvin Heurtelou; DT | Spring Valley, NY | Scottsdale C.C. (Scottsdale, AZ) | 6 ft 3 in (1.91 m) | 318 lb (144 kg) | N/A | Dec 26, 2013 |
| Calvin Heurtelou; DT | Recruit ratings: Scout: Rivals: 247Sports: ESPN: | | | | | |
| Demetrius Jackson; DE | Miami, FL | Booker T. Washington HS | 6 ft 5 in (1.96 m) | 225 lb (102 kg) | N/A | Jun 28, 2013 |
| Demetrius Jackson; DE | Recruit ratings: Scout: Rivals: 247Sports: ESPN: | | | | | |
| Courtel Jenkins; DT | Wayne, NJ | De Paul Catholic HS | 6 ft 2 in (1.88 m) | 315 lb (143 kg) | N/A | Jun 6, 2013 |
| Courtel Jenkins; DT | Recruit ratings: Scout: Rivals: 247Sports: ESPN: | | | | | |
| Brad Kaaya; QB | West Hills, CA | Chaminade College Prep | 6 ft 4 in (1.93 m) | 213 lb (97 kg) | N/A | May 13, 2013 |
| Brad Kaaya; QB | Recruit ratings: Scout: Rivals: 247Sports: ESPN: | | | | | |
| Darrell Langham; WR | Lantana, FL | Santaluces Community HS | 6 ft 5 in (1.96 m) | 205 lb (93 kg) | 4.5 | Jun 9, 2013 |
| Darrell Langham; WR | Recruit ratings: Scout: Rivals: 247Sports: ESPN: | | | | | |
| Nick Linder; C | Fort Lauderdale, FL | St. Thomas Aquinas HS | 6 ft 3 in (1.91 m) | 278 lb (126 kg) | N/A | Mar 6, 2013 |
| Nick Linder; C | Recruit ratings: Scout: Rivals: 247Sports: ESPN: | | | | | |
| Ryan Mayes; CB | Miami, FL | Miami Northwestern HS | 6 ft 1 in (1.85 m) | 185 lb (84 kg) | 4.6 | Jun 24, 2013 |
| Ryan Mayes; CB | Recruit ratings: Scout: Rivals: 247Sports: ESPN: | | | | | |
| Terry McCray; LB | Pompano Beach, FL | Blanche Ely HS | 6 ft 3 in (1.91 m) | 215 lb (98 kg) | N/A | Jul 23, 2013 |
| Terry McCray; LB | Recruit ratings: Scout: Rivals: 247Sports: ESPN: | | | | | |
| K. C. McDermott; OT | Wellington, FL | Palm Beach Gardens HS | 6 ft 6 in (1.98 m) | 301 lb (137 kg) | N/A | Apr 2, 2013 |
| K. C. McDermott; OT | Recruit ratings: Scout: Rivals: 247Sports: ESPN: | | | | | |
| Anthony Moten; DT | Fort Lauderdale, FL | St. Thomas Aquinas HS | 6 ft 4 in (1.93 m) | 292 lb (132 kg) | 4.9 | Nov 13, 2013 |
| Anthony Moten; DT | Recruit ratings: Scout: Rivals: 247Sports: ESPN: | | | | | |
| David Njoku; TE | Cedar Grove, NJ | Cedar Grove HS | 6 ft 4 in (1.93 m) | 215 lb (98 kg) | N/A | Jan 31, 2014 |
| David Njoku; TE | Recruit ratings: Scout: Rivals: 247Sports: ESPN: | | | | | |
| Darrion Owens; LB | Orange Park, FL | Oakleaf HS | 6 ft 3 in (1.91 m) | 220 lb (100 kg) | N/A | Jun 22, 2013 |
| Darrion Owens; LB | Recruit ratings: Scout: Rivals: 247Sports: ESPN: | | | | | |
| Malik Rosier; QB | Mobile, AL | Faith Academy | 6 ft 2 in (1.88 m) | 200 lb (91 kg) | N/A | Jun 25, 2013 |
| Malik Rosier; QB | Recruit ratings: Scout: Rivals: 247Sports: ESPN: | | | | | |
| Mike Smith; LB | Miami, FL | Miami Northwestern HS | 6 ft 2 in (1.88 m) | 210 lb (95 kg) | 4.5 | Jun 22, 2013 |
| Mike Smith; LB | Recruit ratings: Scout: Rivals: 247Sports: ESPN: | | | | | |
| Chad Thomas; DE | Miami, FL | Booker T. Washington HS | 6 ft 5 in (1.96 m) | 240 lb (110 kg) | N/A | Jul 23, 2013 |
| Chad Thomas; DE | Recruit ratings: Scout: Rivals: 247Sports: ESPN: | | | | | |
| Michael Wyche; DT | Norfolk, VA | East Los Angeles College (Monterey Park, CA) | 6 ft 4 in (1.93 m) | 330 lb (150 kg) | N/A | Oct 23, 2013 |
| Michael Wyche; DT | Recruit ratings: Scout: Rivals: 247Sports: ESPN: | | | | | |
| Joeseph Yearby; RB | Miami, FL | Miami Central HS | 5 ft 9 in (1.75 m) | 191 lb (87 kg) | 4.5 | Feb 26, 2013 |
| Joeseph Yearby; RB | Recruit ratings: Scout: Rivals: 247Sports: ESPN: | | | | | |
| Juwon Young; LB | Albany, GA | Albany HS | 6 ft 2 in (1.88 m) | 235 lb (107 kg) | 4.7 | Jun 8, 2013 |
| Juwon Young; LB | Recruit ratings: Scout: Rivals: 247Sports: ESPN: | | | | | |
Overall recruit ranking: Scout: 11 Rivals: 12 247Sports: 12 ESPN: 10
‡ Refers to 40-yard dash; Note: In many cases, Scout, Rivals, 247Sports, On3, and ESPN may conflict in their listings of height, weight and 40 time.; In these cases, the average was taken. ESPN grades are on a 100-point scale.; Sources: "Miami Signee List 2014". Rivals.; "Scout.com Football Recruiting: Miami". Scout.; "2014 Player Signees- Miami". ESPN.; "Scout.com Team Recruiting Rankings". Scout.; "2014 Team Ranking". Rivals.com.

== Schedule ==
| Date | Time | Opponent | Site | TV | Result | Attendance |
|---|---|---|---|---|---|---|
| September 1 | 8:00 pm | at Louisville | Papa John's Cardinal Stadium; Louisville, KY (rivalry) | ESPN | L 13–31 | 55,428 |
| September 6 | 7:00 pm | Florida A&M* | Sun Life Stadium; Miami Gardens, FL | ESPN3 | W 41–7 | 48,254 |
| September 13 | 3:30 pm | Arkansas State* | Sun Life Stadium; Miami Gardens, FL | ESPNU | W 41–20 | 41,519 |
| September 20 | 8:00 pm | at No. 24 Nebraska* | Memorial Stadium; Lincoln, NE (rivalry) | ESPN2 | L 31–41 | 91,585 |
| September 27 | 7:30 pm | Duke | Sun Life Stadium; Miami Gardens, FL | ESPN2 | W 22–10 | 44,559 |
| October 4 | 7:30 pm | at Georgia Tech | Bobby Dodd Stadium; Atlanta, GA | ESPN2 | L 17–28 | 52,221 |
| October 11 | 12:00 pm | Cincinnati* | Sun Life Stadium; Miami Gardens, FL | RSN | W 55–34 | 43,953 |
| October 23 | 7:30 pm | at Virginia Tech | Lane Stadium; Blacksburg, VA (rivalry) | ESPN | W 30–6 | 64,007 |
| November 1 | 12:30 pm | North Carolina^{†} | Sun Life Stadium; Miami Gardens, FL | ACCN | W 47–20 | 51,702 |
| November 15 | 8:00 pm | No. 2 Florida State | Sun Life Stadium; Miami Gardens, FL (rivalry) | ABC | L 26–30 | 76,530 |
| November 22 | 7:00 pm | at Virginia | Scott Stadium; Charlottesville, VA | ESPN | L 13–30 | 44,750 |
| November 29 | 7:00 pm | Pittsburgh | Sun Life Stadium; Miami Gardens, FL | ESPN | L 23–35 | 61,106 |
| December 27 | 4:00 pm | vs. South Carolina* | Independence Stadium; Shreveport, LA (Independence Bowl) | ABC | L 21–24 | 38,242 |
*Non-conference game; ^{†}Homecoming; Rankings from AP Poll released prior to the game; All times are in Eastern time

== Season summary ==
=== North Carolina ===
North Carolina Tar Heels (4–4) at Miami (FL) Hurricanes (5–3)

| Quarter | 1 | 2 | 3 | 4 | Total |
|---|---|---|---|---|---|
| North Carolina | 0 | 6 | 7 | 7 | 20 |
| Miami (FL) | 7 | 23 | 14 | 3 | 47 |

at Sun Life Stadium, Miami Gardens, Florida

- Date: November 1
- Game time: 12:30 p.m. EST
- Game weather: Partly cloudy, 79 °F (26 °C)
- Game attendance: 51,702
- Referee: J. Magallanes
- TV announcers (ACC Network): Tim Brant, David Archer, Rachel Baribeau
- Box Score

Game information

First quarter

- UM – Duke Johnson 1-yard run (Michael Badgley kick), 5:43. Miami (FL) 7–0. Drive: 13 plays, 84 yards, 7:10.

Second quarter

- UM – Safety. Miami (FL) 9–0
- UNC – Cayson Collins 39-yard fumble return (kick failed), 13:37. Miami (FL) 9–6.
- UM – Clive Walford 14-yard pass from Brad Kaaya (Michael Badgley kick), 5:17. Miami (FL) 16–6. Drive: 7 plays, 61 yards, 3:57.
- UM – Duke Johnson 90-yard run (Michael Badgley kick), 2:55. Miami (FL) 23–6. Drive: 1 play, 90 yards, 0:13.
- UM – Clive Walford 14-yard pass from Brad Kaaya (Michael Badgley kick), 0:26. Miami (FL) 30–6. Drive: 7 plays, 56 yards, 1:51.

Third quarter

- UM – Duke Johnson 37-yard pass from Brad Kaaya (Michael Badgley kick), 12:37. Miami (FL) 37–6. Drive: 5 plays, 75 yards, 2:23.
- UM – Joe Yearby 1-yard run (Michael Badgley kick), 7:12. Miami (FL) 44–6. Drive: 3 plays, 12 yards, 1:19.
- UNC – Marquise Williams 10-yard run (Thomas Moore kick), 5:11. Miami (FL) 44–13. Drive: 6 plays, 65 yards, 2:01.

Fourth quarter

- UM – Michael Badgley 37-yard field goal, 13:19. Miami (FL) 47–13. Drive: 7 plays, 30 yards, 3:01.
- UNC – Marquise Williams 1-yard run (Thomas Moore kick), 9:20. Miami (FL) 47–20. Drive: 11 plays, 75 yards, 3:59.

Top passers

- UNC – Marquise Williams – 22/32, 186 yards, INT
- UM – Brad Kaaya – 11/17, 189 yards, 3 TD

Top rushers

- UNC – Romar Morris – 5 rushes, 23 yards
- UM – Duke Johnson – 19 rushes, 177 yards, 2 TD

Top receivers

- UNC – T.J. Thorpe – 4 receptions, 66 yards
- UM – Clive Walford – 6 receptions, 89 yards, 2 TD

- Homecoming

== 2015 NFL draft ==
| Player | Position | Round | Pick | Team |
| Ereck Flowers | Offensive tackle | 1 | 9 | New York Giants |
| Phillip Dorsett | Wide receiver | 1 | 29 | Indianapolis Colts |
| Denzel Perryman | Linebacker | 2 | 48 | San Diego Chargers |
| Clive Walford | Tight end | 3 | 68 | Oakland Raiders |
| Duke Johnson | Running back | 3 | 77 | Cleveland Browns |
| Jon Feliciano | Offensive Guard | 4 | 128 | Oakland Raiders |
| Anthony Chickillo | Defensive end | 6 | 212 | Pittsburgh Steelers |
