= Charleston Rambo =

American gridiron football player (born 1999)

- Rambo with the Montreal Alouettes in 2026

No. 4 – Montreal Alouettes
- Position: Wide receiver
- Roster status: Active
- CFL status: American

Personal information
- Born: August 10, 1999 (age 27); Cedar Hill, Texas, U.S.
- Listed height: 6 ft 1 in (1.85 m)
- Listed weight: 185 lb (84 kg)

Career information
- High school: Cedar Hill
- College: Oklahoma (2017–2020); Miami (FL) (2021)
- NFL draft: 2022: undrafted

Career history
- Carolina Panthers (2022)*; Orlando Guardians (2023); Philadelphia Eagles (2023); Montreal Alouettes (2024–present)
- * Offseason or practice squad member only

Awards and highlights
- Second-team All-ACC (2021)

Career CFL statistics as of 2026
- Targets: 200
- Receptions: 132
- Receiving yards: 1,624
- Touchdowns: 11
- Stats at Pro Football Reference
- Stats at CFL.ca

Charleston Rambo (born August 10, 1999) is an American professional football wide receiver for the Montreal Alouettes of the Canadian Football League (CFL). He played college football at Oklahoma before transferring to Miami and was signed as an undrafted free agent by the Carolina Panthers in 2022.

== Early life ==
Rambo attended Cedar Hill High School in Cedar Hill, Texas, where he played high school football. As a senior in 2016, he had 87 receptions for 1,590 yards and 25 touchdowns. He committed to playing college football for Oklahoma.

== College career ==
After redshirting his first year at Oklahoma in 2017, Rambo played in 12 games in 2018 and had eight receptions for 125 yards and a touchdown. He took over as a starter in 2019 and started all 14 games. He finished second on the team to CeeDee Lamb with 43 receptions for 743 yards and five touchdowns.

== Professional career ==
Pre-draft measurables
Height	Weight	Arm length	Hand span	Wingspan	40-yard dash	10-yard split	20-yard split	20-yard shuttle	Three-cone drill	Vertical jump	Broad jump
6 ft 0 5/8 in (1.84 m)	177 lb (80 kg)	32 in (0.81 m)	9 3/4 in (0.25 m)	6 ft 4 1/2 in (1.94 m)	4.57 s	1.53 s	2.57 s	4.21 s	7.09 s	33.5 in (0.85 m)	9 ft 10 in (3.00 m)
All values from NFL Combine/Pro Day

=== Carolina Panthers ===
Rambo signed with the Carolina Panthers as an undrafted free agent on May 1, 2022. He was waived on August 30.

=== Orlando Guardians ===
On November 17, 2022, Rambo was drafted by the Orlando Guardians of the XFL. He was released from his contract on May 15, 2023.

=== Philadelphia Eagles ===
On May 16, 2023, Rambo signed with the Philadelphia Eagles. He was waived/injured by the Eagles on August 6, 2023. He was waived with an injury settlement on September 12, 2023.

=== Montreal Alouettes ===
On May 13, 2024, Rambo signed with the Montreal Alouettes of the Canadian Football League. During training camp, he wore number 76. He became a free agent upon the expiry of his contract on February 10, 2026.

On September 8, 2026, Rambo re-signed with the Alouettes.
