= Stephen Morris (American football) =

American football player (born 1992)

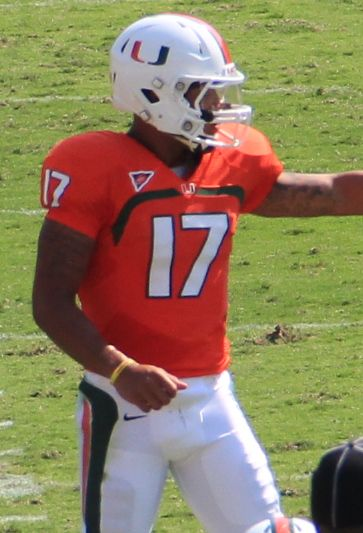
- Morris with the Miami Hurricanes in 2012

No. 4, 6, 7
- Position: Quarterback

Personal information
- Born: August 27, 1992 (age 34); Miami, Florida, U.S.
- Listed height: 6 ft 2 in (1.88 m)
- Listed weight: 220 lb (100 kg)

Career information
- High school: Monsignor Edward Pace (Miami Gardens, Florida)
- College: Miami (FL) (2010–2013)
- NFL draft: 2014: undrafted

Career history
- Jacksonville Jaguars (2014); Philadelphia Eagles (2015); Indianapolis Colts (2015–2016); Washington Redskins (2018)*; Seattle Seahawks (2018)*; Houston Texans (2018)*; Orlando Apollos (2019)*
- * Offseason or practice squad member only
- Stats at Pro Football Reference

Stephen Morris (born August 27, 1992) is an American former football quarterback. He played college football at the University of Miami, and signed with the Jacksonville Jaguars as an undrafted free agent in 2014. Morris was also a member of the Philadelphia Eagles, Indianapolis Colts, Washington Redskins, Seattle Seahawks, Houston Texans, and Orlando Apollos.

== Early life ==
Morris attended Monsignor Edward Pace High School in Miami Gardens, Florida. During his career he completed 240 of 404 passes for 3,536 yards.

== College career ==
As a true freshman in 2010, Morris appeared in six games with four starts. He finished the season completing 82 of 153 passes for 1,240 yards with seven touchdowns and nine interceptions. As a sophomore in 2011, he appeared in five games with one start. He completed 26 of 37 passes for 283 yards with two interceptions. As a junior in 2012, he entered the season as the starting quarterback and started all 12 of the Hurricanes games. On September 29, 2012, in a game against NC State, he set the ACC record for passing yards in a game with 566. He finished the season completing 245 of 421 passes for 3,345 yards with 21 touchdowns and seven interceptions. As a senior in 2013, he passed for 3,028 yards and 21 touchdowns. He finished his career with 7,896 yards with 49 touchdowns and 30 interceptions.

== Professional career ==
Pre-draft measurables
Height	Weight	Arm length	Hand span	40-yard dash	10-yard split	20-yard split	20-yard shuttle	Three-cone drill	Vertical jump	Broad jump
6 ft 1 7/8 in (1.88 m)	213 lb (97 kg)	32 3/4 in (0.83 m)	10 1/4 in (0.26 m)	4.63 s	1.62 s	2.70 s	4.49 s	7.36 s	30.0 in (0.76 m)	9 ft 3 in (2.82 m)
All values from NFL Combine

=== Jacksonville Jaguars ===
Following the 2014 NFL draft, Morris was signed as an undrafted free agent by the Jacksonville Jaguars. The Jaguars released Morris on August 29, 2014. He was signed to the practice squad on August 31, 2014.

He was released on September 4, 2015.

=== Philadelphia Eagles ===
Morris was claimed off waivers by the Philadelphia Eagles on September 6, 2015. He was released on September 21, 2015, but re-signed with their practice squad on September 22.

=== Indianapolis Colts ===
On December 24, 2015, Morris was signed to the active roster of the Indianapolis Colts. On September 7, 2016, he was released by the Colts. He was signed to the practice squad the following day. He was elevated to the active roster on November 23, 2016, after starting quarterback Andrew Luck suffered a concussion. On December 1, 2016, he was waived by the Colts and was re-signed to the practice squad the next day.

Morris signed a reserve/future contract with the Colts on January 2, 2017. He was waived on September 3, 2017.

=== Washington Redskins ===
On January 2, 2018, Morris signed a reserve/future contract with the Washington Redskins. He was waived on April 9, 2018.

=== Seattle Seahawks ===
On April 13, 2018, Morris signed with the Seattle Seahawks. He was waived on May 11, 2018.

=== Houston Texans ===
On May 14, 2018, Morris was claimed off waivers by the Houston Texans. He was waived on August 16, 2018.

=== Orlando Apollos ===
On November 27, he was protected by the Apollos in the second round of the Pick or Protect QB Draft. He was cut on January 30, 10 days prior to the start of the AAF's inaugural season.
