= Leonard Hankerson =

American football player and coach (born 1989)

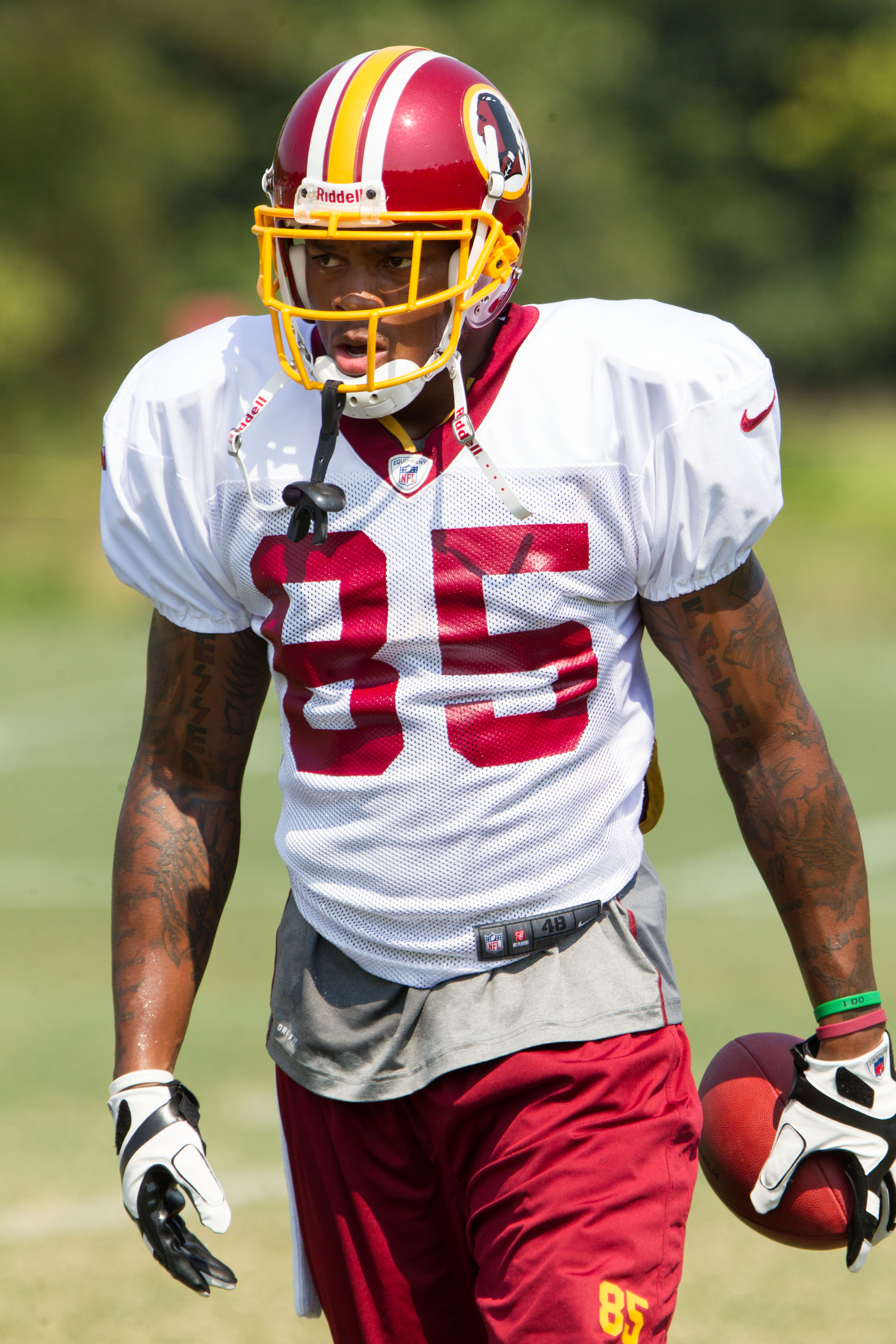
- Hankerson with the Washington Redskins in 2012

San Francisco 49ers
- Title: Passing game coordinator, Wide receivers coach

Personal information
- Born: January 30, 1989 (age 37); Fort Lauderdale, Florida, U.S.
- Listed height: 6 ft 1 in (1.85 m)
- Listed weight: 205 lb (93 kg)

Career information
- Position: Wide receiver (No. 85, 15, 80)
- High school: St. Thomas Aquinas (Fort Lauderdale)
- College: Miami (FL) (2007–2010)
- NFL draft: 2011: 3rd round, 79th overall pick

Career history

Playing
- Washington Redskins (2011–2014); Atlanta Falcons (2015); New England Patriots (2015); Buffalo Bills (2015)

Coaching
- Palmer Trinity School (2016) Wide receivers coach; UMass (2017–2018); Graduate assistant (2017); Wide receivers coach (2018); Stephen F. Austin (2019–2020) Wide receivers coach; San Francisco 49ers (2021–present); Offensive quality control coach (2021); Wide receivers coach (2022–2024); Passing game specialist / Wide receivers coach (2025); Passing game coordinator / Wide receivers coach (2026–present)

Awards and highlights
- First-team All-ACC (2010)

Career NFL statistics
- Receptions: 107
- Receiving yards: 1,408
- Receiving touchdowns: 9
- Stats at Pro Football Reference

Leonard Hankerson Jr. (born January 30, 1989) is an American professional football coach and former player who is the passing game coordinator and wide receivers coach for the San Francisco 49ers of the National Football League (NFL). He played professionally as a wide receiver for five seasons in the NFL. Hankerson played college football for the Miami Hurricanes, and was selected by the Washington Redskins in the third round of the 2011 NFL draft. He also played for the Atlanta Falcons, New England Patriots, and Buffalo Bills.

== Early life ==
Hankerson attended St. Thomas Aquinas High School in Fort Lauderdale, Florida. As a junior, he had 28 receptions, 606 receiving yards, and 14 touchdowns. In his senior year, he had 39 receptions, 803 receiving yards, and 14 touchdowns.

== College career ==
As a true freshman in 2007, Hankerson started two of seven games, and had six receptions for 63 yards and a touchdown. As a sophomore in 2008 he started two of eight games, making 11 receptions for 140 yards and two touchdowns. As a junior in 2009, he became a full-time starter. He started 12 of 13 games and finished the season with 45 receptions for 801 yards and six touchdowns. His senior year he hauled in 72 catches for 1,156 yard and 13 touchdowns. The 13 touchdowns passed Michael Irvin for the most in a single season by a Hurricane. In the Senior Bowl, Hankerson stood out as the best receiver catching 5 passes for 100 yards and a touchdown.

== Professional playing career ==
Pre-draft measurables
Height	Weight	Arm length	Hand span	Wingspan	40-yard dash	10-yard split	20-yard split	20-yard shuttle	Three-cone drill	Vertical jump	Broad jump	Bench press
6 ft 1 1/2 in (1.87 m)	209 lb (95 kg)	32 1/4 in (0.82 m)	10 5/8 in (0.27 m)	6 ft 6 1/8 in (1.98 m)	4.53 s	1.59 s	2.63 s	4.21 s	6.94 s	36 in (0.91 m)	9 ft 9 in (2.97 m)	14 reps
All values from NFL Combine

=== Washington Redskins ===
Hankerson was selected by the Washington Redskins in the third round of the 2011 NFL draft. Hankerson made his NFL debut in Week 7 against the Carolina Panthers. In Week 9 against the San Francisco 49ers, he made his first career start. His rookie season was cut short after suffering a subluxation of his right hip and a torn labrum in his second game as a starter against the Miami Dolphins. On November 15, Hankerson was officially placed on injured reserve.

After nearly three months of relying solely on physical therapy, it was confirmed that Hankerson had surgery on his hip on February 21, 2012. Hankerson was fully healed from the surgery and ready by the start of training camp in late July. In the preseason, he competed with and lost to Josh Morgan for the starting flanker position. In Week 2 against the St. Louis Rams, he recorded his first career touchdown after catching a 68-yard pass from Robert Griffin III. In the Week 15 win over the Cleveland Browns, he would score two touchdowns with one of them being a 54-yard touchdown pass while under triple coverage from Kirk Cousins.

In the 2013 season opener against the Philadelphia Eagles, Hankerson scored two touchdowns. Originally behind Josh Morgan in the depth chart again, he was later made the second starting wide receiver opposite of Pierre Garçon due to his improved performance. The Redskins placed him on injured reserve on November 21, 2013, after he tore his left LCL and ACL in the Week 11 game against the Philadelphia Eagles.

Having spent all of training camp on the PUP list, it was confirmed that Hankerson would remain by the start of the 2014 season on August 30, 2014. On November 4, the Redskins placed him on the active roster.

=== Atlanta Falcons ===
The Atlanta Falcons signed Hankerson to a one-year deal on March 11, 2015. On December 4, 2015, Hankerson was placed on season-ending Injured Reserve due to his struggles with hamstring injuries. On December 15 he was released from injured reserve, making him a free agent.

=== New England Patriots ===
The New England Patriots claimed Hankerson off waivers on December 16, 2015. Hankerson played in one game before being waived on December 26.

=== Buffalo Bills ===
The Buffalo Bills claimed Hankerson off waivers on December 28, 2015.

On March 24, 2016, the Bills re-signed Hankerson on a one-year contract. On August 15, 2016, he was released by the Bills, following a poor showing in the team's first preseason game in which he dropped most of the passes thrown at him.

== Coaching career ==
=== UMass ===
Hankerson joined Mark Whipple's UMass football staff as an offensive graduate assistant in July 2017 and earned a promotion into the role of wide receivers coach for the 2018-19 school year.

=== Stephen F. Austin State ===
Hankerson was the outside wide receivers coach for Stephen F. Austin State University from 2019 through 2020.

=== San Francisco 49ers ===
On February 11, 2021, the San Francisco 49ers announced Hankerson's hiring as their new offensive quality control coach. This reunited him with head coach Kyle Shanahan, who he played under when Shanahan was the offensive coordinator of the Redskins and Falcons. Hankerson was promoted to wide receivers coach in 2022.

In February 2025, the 49ers gave Hankerson the additional role of passing game specialist along with keeping his title of wide receivers coach. On March 30, 2026, the 49ers promoted him to passing game coordinator/wide receivers coach.

== Personal life ==
He has four children: Leonard III, Lenaris, Kienarria and Zara and is married to wife Kayla.
