= Kareem Brown =

American football player and coach (born 1983)

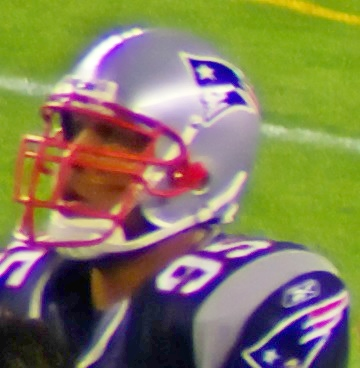
- Brown during a New England Patriots game in 2007

No. 95, 97
- Position: Defensive tackle

Personal information
- Born: January 30, 1983 (age 43); Miami, Florida, U.S.
- Listed height: 6 ft 4 in (1.93 m)
- Listed weight: 285 lb (129 kg)

Career information
- High school: Miami Norland
- College: Miami (FL)
- NFL draft: 2007: 4th round, 127th overall pick

Career history

Playing
- New England Patriots (2007); New York Jets (2007–2008); New York Giants (2009)*; Tennessee Titans (2009–2010)
- * Offseason or practice squad member only

Coaching
- FIU Panthers (2012) Defensive line assistant; Miami Hurricanes (2013–2015) Graduate assistant (2013–2014 – defensive line) Graduate assistant (2015 – outside linebackers)

Awards and highlights
- Second-team All-ACC (2006)
- Stats at Pro Football Reference

Kareem Alexander Brown (born January 30, 1983) is an American former professional football defensive tackle. He was selected by the New England Patriots in the fourth round of the 2007 NFL draft. He played college football at the University of Miami.

Brown was also a member of the New York Jets, New York Giants, and Tennessee Titans. He retired in 2011.

== Professional career ==
Pre-draft measurables
Height	Weight	40-yard dash	10-yard split	20-yard split	20-yard shuttle	Three-cone drill	Vertical jump	Broad jump
6 ft 4 in (1.93 m)	290 lb (132 kg)	5.38 s	1.81 s	3.08 s	4.71 s	7.49 s	28.0 in (0.71 m)	8 ft 5 in (2.57 m)

=== New England Patriots ===
After being drafted by the Patriots, he spent eleven weeks on the team before being waived in week 11 of the 2007 NFL season.

=== New York Jets ===
The Jets claimed him off waivers in week 11 of 2007 season. He was inactive for four games with the Jets before making his NFL debut versus Kansas City on December 30, 2007. He was inactive for the first seven games of the 2008 regular season with the Jets before being waived. He spent the remainder of the 2008 season on the Jets' practice squad. The Jets attempted to convert Brown from defensive end to tight end for 2009, but ultimately released him September 5.

=== New York Giants ===
Brown was signed to the New York Giants practice squad on September 7, 2009. He was released on September 15, 2009.

=== Tennessee Titans ===
Brown was signed to the Tennessee Titans' practice squad on December 17, 2009. After his contract expired at the end of the season, Brown was re-signed on January 5, 2010. He was released on July 28, 2011.

== Coaching career ==
In 2013, Brown became a member of the coaching staff of the Miami Hurricanes, his alma mater, serving first as a defensive line graduate assistant and then as director of player development/defense.
