= Duke Johnson =

American football player (born 1993)

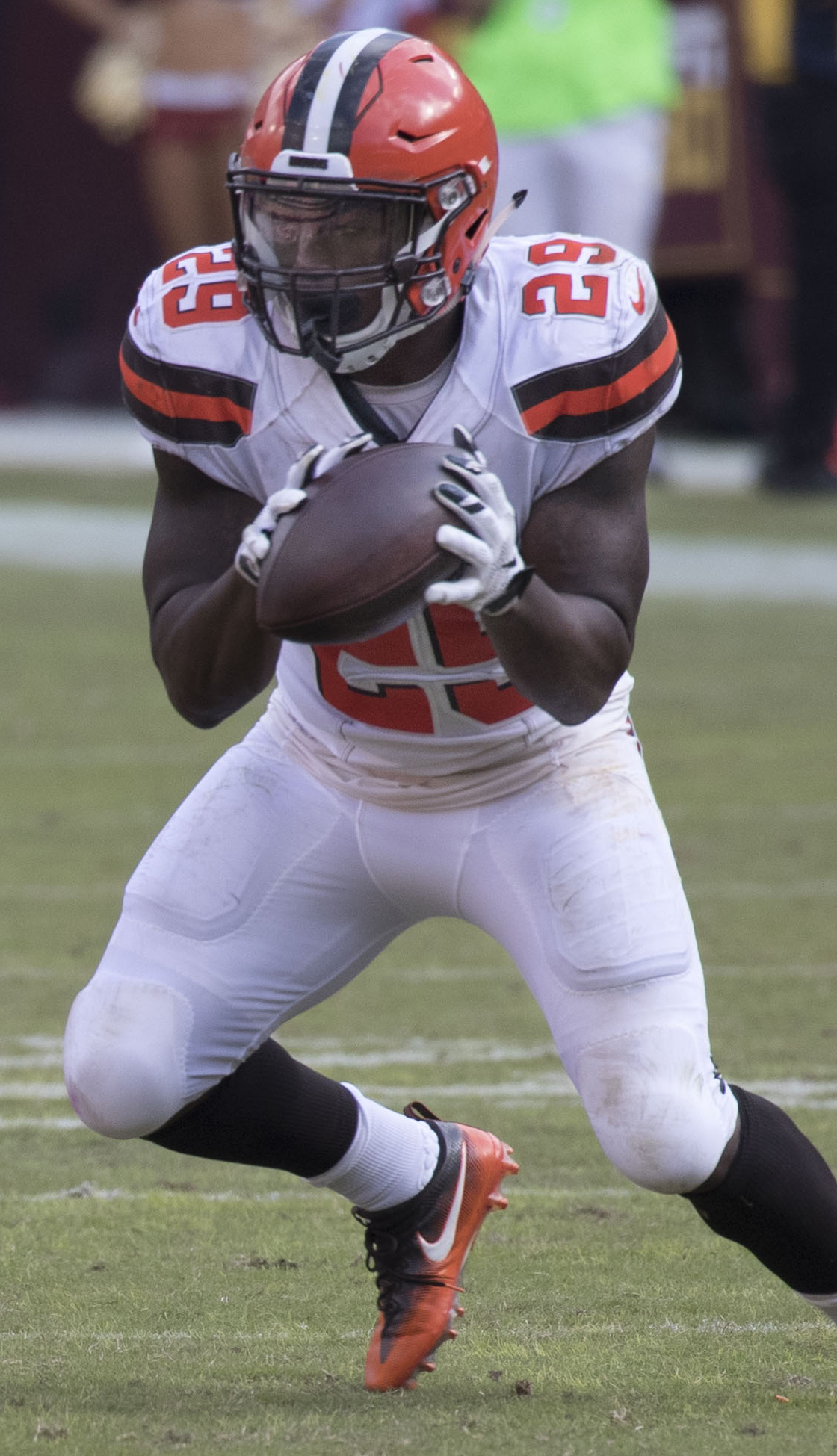
- Johnson with the Cleveland Browns in 2016

No. 29, 25, 28, 22
- Position: Running back

Personal information
- Born: September 23, 1993 (age 33); Miami, Florida, U.S.
- Listed height: 5 ft 9 in (1.75 m)
- Listed weight: 210 lb (95 kg)

Career information
- High school: Miami Norland (Miami Gardens, Florida)
- College: Miami (FL) (2012–2014)
- NFL draft: 2015: 3rd round, 77th overall pick

Career history
- Cleveland Browns (2015–2018); Houston Texans (2019–2020); Jacksonville Jaguars (2021)*; Miami Dolphins (2021); Buffalo Bills (2022)
- * Offseason or practice squad member only

Awards and highlights
- ACC Brian Piccolo Award (2014); First-team All-ACC (2014); 2× Second-team All-ACC (2012, 2013); ACC Rookie of the Year (2012); ACC Offensive Rookie of the Year (2012)

Career NFL statistics
- Rushing yards: 2,265
- Rushing average: 4.3
- Receptions: 311
- Receiving yards: 2,870
- Receiving average: 9.2
- Return yards: 357
- Total touchdowns: 23
- Stats at Pro Football Reference

Randy "Duke" Johnson Jr. (born September 23, 1993) is an American former professional football player who was a running back for eight seasons in the National Football League (NFL). He played college football for the Miami Hurricanes and was selected by the Cleveland Browns in the third round of the 2015 NFL draft. Johnson was also a member of the Houston Texans, Jacksonville Jaguars, Miami Dolphins, and Buffalo Bills.

== Early life ==
Johnson attended Miami Norland Senior High School in Miami Gardens, Florida, where he played football and ran track. As a sophomore, Johnson ran for 1,540 yards and 25 touchdowns. As a junior, he led Norland to a 13–2 record and state runner-up. After beating the Sammy Watkins-led South Fort Myers 44–28 in the semifinals, Norland lost 44–34 to the unbeaten Tampa Jefferson in the class 3A final. As a senior, Johnson had 1,957 rushing yards and 29 touchdowns, 14 receptions for 232 yards and three touchdowns, three kickoff returns and one punt return for scores, as he led Miami Norland to 15–0 finish and state Class 5A championship. In the championship game against Wakulla, Johnson scored five touchdowns.

Johnson was also on the school's track & field team, where he was a standout sprinter and long jumper. He placed fifth in the long jump event at the 2010 GMAC Qualifiers, with a jump of 6.60 meters. In 2011, Johnson placed fourth in the 100 meters at the 3rd Annual Miramar Invitational, recording a career-best time of 10.62 seconds. He finished third in the 200 meters at the FHSAA 3A District 16, with a time of 22.31 seconds.

Johnson was considered the best all-purpose running back recruit by Rivals.com.

== College career ==
Johnson attended and played college football at the University of Miami from 2012 to 2014. As a freshman, he had 139 carries for 947 yards and 10 touchdowns to go along with 27 receptions for 221 yards and a touchdown. Johnson also threw an additional touchdown in a narrow 41–40 loss to Virginia. He played a major role on special teams, where he returned 28 kicks for two touchdowns. In 2012, Johnson won both the Atlantic Coast Conference Rookie of the Year and Offensive Rookie of the Year awards. He became the first Miami Hurricane to win both awards. In 2013, Johnson joined the Miami indoor track team, posting a personal-best time of 6.92 seconds in the 60 meters at New Mexico Classic.

Johnson's sophomore campaign with the Hurricanes football team came to an abrupt end on November 2, 2013, when he broke his ankle against arch-rival Florida State. Miami lost that game 41–14. Through eight games, Johnson had 145 carries for 920 yards and six touchdowns to go along with four receptions for 77 yards.

Johnson returned from injury in 2014 to play in all 13 games. As a junior, he passed Ottis Anderson to become the Hurricanes' all-time rushing yards leader. Johnson finished the season with 242 carries for 1,652 yards and 10 touchdowns to go along with 38 receptions for 421 yards and three touchdowns.

On December 28, 2014, Johnson announced his decision to forgo his senior season and enter the 2015 NFL draft. He finished his college career with 526 carries for 3,519 yards and 26 touchdowns to go along with 69 receptions for 719 yards and four touchdowns.

== Professional career ==
=== Pre-draft ===
Johnson attended the NFL Scouting Combine in Indianapolis and performed a few combine drills before sustaining a hamstring injury. Due to his injury, Johnson skipped the three-cone drill and short shuttle and voluntarily chose to skip the bench press. On April 1, 2015, he participated at Miami's pro day and chose to perform the majority of combine drills, but elected to skip the broad jump. Johnson improved his 40-yard dash (4.51s), 20-yard dash (2.57s), 10-yard dash (1.58s), and vertical jump (35") and also completed the bench press (18), short shuttle (4.16s), and three-cone drill (6.88s). Scouts and team representatives from all 32 NFL teams attended Miami's pro day, including head coaches Mike Tomlin Pittsburgh Steelers, Todd Bowles New York Jets, and Sean Payton New Orleans Saints.

External videos
- Duke Johnson's Combine Workout
- Pro Comparison: Duke Johnson

Johnson also attended private workouts and visits with the New York Giants and Atlanta Falcons. At the conclusion of the pre-draft process, he was projected to be a second-round pick by NFL draft experts and scouts. Johnson was ranked as the fourth best running back prospect in the draft by DraftScout.com and NFL analyst Mike Mayock, was ranked the fifth best running back by Sports Illustrated and Scouts Inc., and was ranked the seventh best running back by NFL analyst Charles Davis.

Pre-draft measurables
Height	Weight	Arm length	Hand span	40-yard dash	10-yard split	20-yard split	20-yard shuttle	Three-cone drill	Vertical jump	Broad jump	Bench press
5 ft 9 1/8 in (1.76 m)	207 lb (94 kg)	30 3/8 in (0.77 m)	9 1/4 in (0.23 m)	4.54 s	1.60 s	2.64 s	4.16 s	6.88 s	33 1/2 in (0.85 m)	10 ft 1 in (3.07 m)	18 reps
All values from NFL Combine/Miami's Pro Day

=== Cleveland Browns ===
==== 2015 ====
The Cleveland Browns selected Johnson in the third round (77th overall) in the 2015 NFL Draft. He was the sixth running back drafted in 2015.

External videos
- Browns draft Duke Johnson 77th overall

On June 16, 2015, the Browns signed Johnson to a four-year, $3.1 million contract with a signing bonus of $710,092.

On August 1, Johnson injured his hamstring on the first day of the Browns' training camp. He was sidelined for the next 10 days, and was inactive during the first preseason game against the Washington Redskins at FirstEnergy Stadium. During Johnson's first pre-season appearance, he was diagnosed with a concussion and was removed from the game. Throughout training camp, Johnson competed to be one of the primary running backs in the Browns' rotation against Isaiah Crowell, Terrance West, and Shaun Draughn. Head coach Mike Pettine named Johnson the backup running back, behind Isaiah Crowell, to begin the regular season. Johnson replaced Terrance West after West showed up to training camp overweight and was released as part of final roster cuts.

Johnson made his professional regular season debut and first career start in the season opener against the Jets and had seven carries for 22 yards during the 31–10 road loss. Three weeks later against the San Diego Chargers, Johnson had eight carries for 31 yards and recorded a season-high nine receptions for 85 yards and scored his first career touchdown in the 30–27 road loss. Johnson scored his first career touchdown on a 34-yard reception by quarterback Josh McCown in the second quarter. During Week 14 against the San Francisco 49ers, he had a season-high 13 carries for 78 yards in the 24–10 victory.

Johnson finished his rookie year with 104 carries for 379 yards and 61 receptions for 534 yards and two touchdowns in 16 games and seven starts. Johnson's 61 receptions are the second-most by a Browns rookie, tied with wide receiver Greg Little. Among rookies, Johnson ranked first in receptions and receiving yards among rookie running backs and second in receptions overall, just under Oakland Raiders' Amari Cooper. Johnson was ranked sixth overall among rookies in receiving yards and was one of six rookies to surpass 500 yards receiving.

==== 2016 ====
On January 4, 2016, the Browns fired head coach Mike Pettine and general manager Ray Farmer after the Browns finished with a 3–13 record in 2015. During training camp, Johnson competed to be the starting running back against Isaiah Crowell. New head coach Hue Jackson officially named Johnson the backup running back, behind Isaiah Crowell, to start the regular season.

During Week 3 against the Miami Dolphins, Johnson had a season-high 10 carries for 69 yards and caught five passes for 12 yards in the 30–24 road loss. Three weeks later against the Tennessee Titans, Johnson had four carries for 18 yards and four receptions for 56 yards while also scoring his first rushing touchdown in the narrow 28–26 road loss. During Week 8 against the Jets, Johnson caught six passes for a season-high 87 yards and had four carries for 29 yards in the 31–28 loss.

Johnson finished his second professional season with 73 carries for 358 yards (4.9 yards per carry) and a touchdown to go along with 53 receptions for 514 yards in 16 games and one start. Johnson served as a punt returner in 2016 and had 17 returns for 112 yards. He also had two fumbles and recorded two solo tackles in special teams.

==== 2017 ====
Johnson shared the Browns' backfield with Isaiah Crowell in the 2017 season. During Week 15 against the Baltimore Ravens, Johnson became the first NFL running back since Herschel Walker in 1986–1988 to record at least 500 receiving yards in each of his first three seasons.

Johnson finished the 2017 season with 82 carries for 348 yards and four touchdowns to go along with 74 receptions for 693 yards and three touchdowns in 16 games and no starts as the Browns struggled to only the second 0–16 season in NFL history.

==== 2018 ====
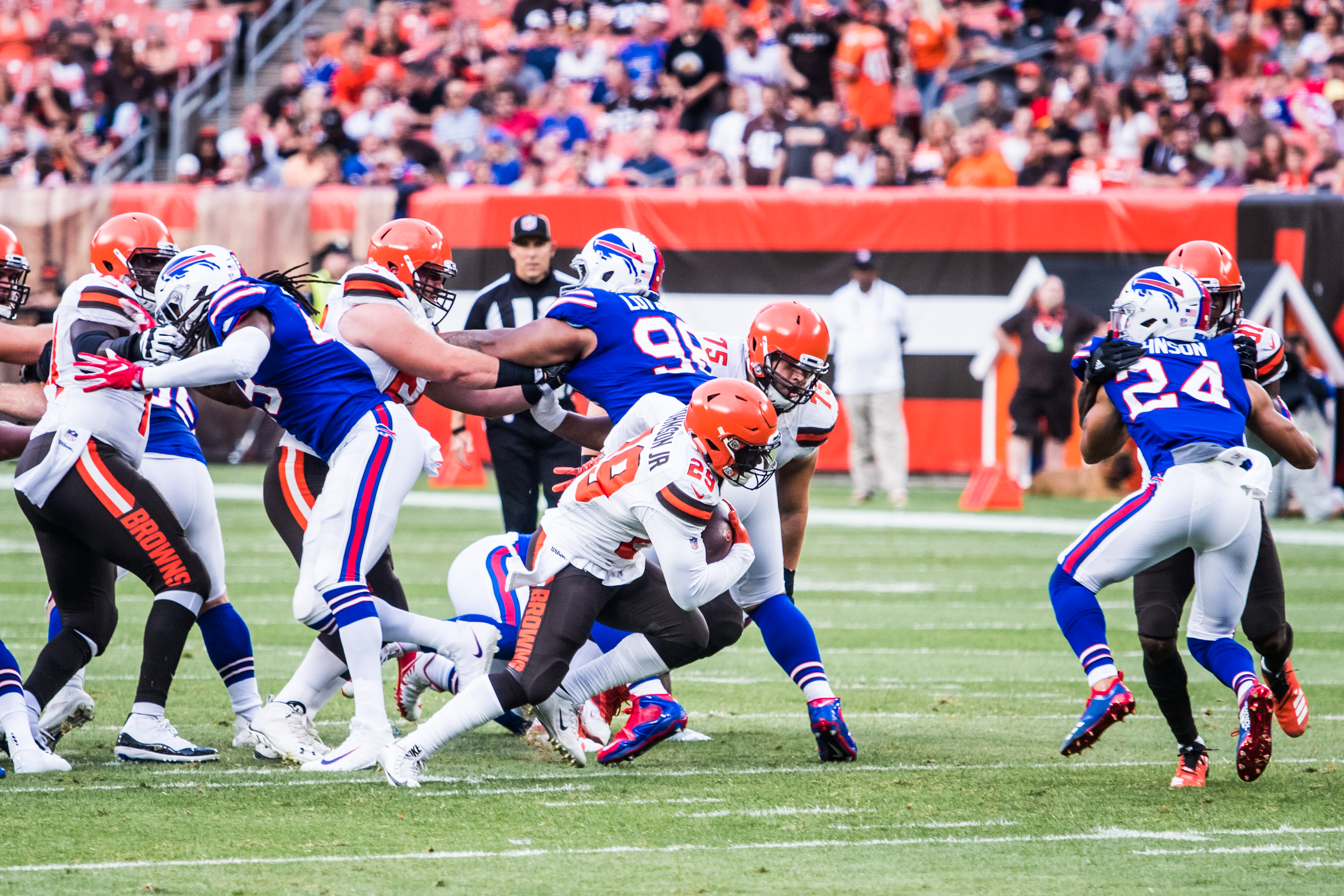
Johnson (#29) in 2018

On June 7, 2018, the Browns signed Johnson to a three-year, $15.61 million contract extension with $7.75 million guaranteed and a signing bonus of $3 million. Going into the 2018 season, Johnson shared the backfield with Carlos Hyde and rookie Nick Chubb.

Through the first six games, Johnson retained his familiar role as a runner and catcher totaling 111 rushing yards and 14 receptions for 164 yards. Before Week 7, Hyde was traded to the Jacksonville Jaguars. During Week 9 against the Kansas City Chiefs, Johnson had nine receptions for 78 yards and two touchdowns in the 37–21 loss. Overall, he finished the 2018 season with 40 carries for 201 yards to go along with 47 receptions for 429 yards and three touchdowns in 16 games and two starts.

=== Houston Texans ===
==== 2019 ====
On August 8, 2019, Johnson was traded to the Houston Texans for a conditional 2020 fourth-round pick that can become a third-round pick if active on the Texans roster for 10 games.

Johnson made his debut with the Texans in the season-opener against the Saints and finished the narrow 30–28 road loss with nine carries for 57 yards and four receptions for 33 yards. Overall, Johnson finished the 2019 season with 83 carries for 410 yards and two touchdowns to go along with 44 receptions for 410 yards and three touchdowns in 16 games and two starts.

==== 2020 ====
In the 2020 season, Johnson finished with 77 carries for 235 yards and a touchdown to go along with 28 receptions for 249 yards and a touchdown in 11 games and five starts.

On February 26, 2021, Johnson was released by the Texans.

=== Jacksonville Jaguars ===
On September 6, 2021, Johnson was signed to the practice squad of the Jacksonville Jaguars. He was released 10 days later.

=== Miami Dolphins ===
On October 26, 2021, Johnson was signed to the Dolphins practice squad.

On December 19, 2021, in his first home game with the Dolphins, Johnson rushed for a career high 107 yards and two touchdowns in a 31–24 victory over the Jets. The next day, Johnson was signed to the active roster. He finished the 2021 season with 71 carries for 330 yards and three touchdowns to go along with four receptions for 41 yards in five games and four starts.

=== Buffalo Bills ===
On March 22, 2022, Johnson signed a one-year deal with the Buffalo Bills. He was released on August 30, but was signed to the practice squad the next day. Johnson's practice squad contract with the team expired after the season on January 22, 2023.

=== Retirement ===
Johnson announced his retirement from the NFL on May 5, 2024.

== Career statistics ==
=== NFL ===
==== Regular season ====
Year	Team	Games		Rushing					Receiving					Fumbles	
Year	Team	GP	GS	Att	Yds	Avg	Lng	TD	Rec	Yds	Avg	Lng	TD	Fum	Lost
2015	CLE	16	7	104	379	3.6	39	0	61	534	8.8	52	2	1	0
2016	CLE	16	1	73	358	4.9	22	1	53	514	9.7	32	0	2	1
2017	CLE	16	0	82	348	4.2	19T	4	74	693	9.4	41T	3	4	2
2018	CLE	16	2	40	201	5.0	23	0	47	429	9.1	32	3	1	0
2019	HOU	16	2	83	410	4.9	40	2	44	410	9.3	21	3	1	1
2020	HOU	11	5	77	235	3.1	23	1	28	249	8.9	48	1	3	2
2021	MIA	5	4	71	330	4.6	27	3	4	41	10.3	20	0	1	0
2022	BUF	1	0	2	4	2.0	4	0	0	0	0.0	0	0	0	0
Total		97	21	532	2,265	4.3	40	11	311	2,870	9.2	52	12	12	6

==== Postseason ====
Year	Team	Games		Rushing					Receiving					Fumbles	
Year	Team	GP	GS	Att	Yds	Avg	Lng	TD	Rec	Yds	Avg	Lng	TD	Fum	Lost
2019	HOU	1	0	3	38	12.6	19	0	3	30	10.0	18	0	0	0
Total		1	0	3	38	12.6	19	0	3	30	10.0	18	0	0	0

=== College ===
Season	Team	Rushing					Receiving			
Season	Team	Att	Yds	Avg	Lng	TD	Rec	Yds	Avg	TD
2012	Miami	139	947	6.8	65	10	27	221	8.2	1
2013	Miami	145	920	6.3	59	6	4	77	19.3	0
2014	Miami	242	1,652	6.8	90	10	38	421	11.1	3
Career		526	3,519	6.7	90	26	69	719	10.4	4

== Personal life ==
Johnson is the cousin of professional basketball player Dewan Hernandez.
