= Pyle (surname) =

Pyle is a surname. Notable people with the surname include:

- Alan Pyle (born 1946), Canadian water polo player and Olympics competitor
- Anna Marie Pyle (born ?), American professor of biology and chemistry
- Andrew Pyle (philosopher) (born 1955), British philosopher
- Andrew Pyle (economist) (born 1963), Canadian economist
- Andy Pyle (born 1946), English bassist
- Artimus Pyle (born 1948), drummer for the rock & roll group Lynyrd Skynyrd
- Barbara Pyle (born 1947), American executive producer, filmmaker, and environmental activist
- Barry Pyle (born 1965), American political scientist
- Brandy Pyle (born 1980), American politician
- Charles C. Pyle (1882–1939), American theater and sports entrepreneur
- Christopher Pyle (born 1939), American professor of politics
- Chuck Pyle (a.k.a. "Zen Cowboy"; 1945–2015), American country-folk singer-songwriter and guitarist
- Dan Pyle (born 1954), American "contemporary realist" painter
- David Pyle (1936–2002), English footballer
- Dennis Pyle (born 1961), American politician
- Denver Pyle (1920–1997), American actor
- Don Pyle, Canadian record producer
- Elijah Pyle (1918–2009), English professional footballer
- Ellen Bernard Thompson Pyle (1876–1936), American illustrator
- Ernie Pyle (1900–1945), Pulitzer Prize-winning journalist
- Ewald "Lefty" Pyle (1910–2004), American baseball pitcher
- Fergus Pyle (1935–1997), Irish journalist, and editor of The Irish Times
- George E. Pyle (1885–1949), American college football coach and college athletics administrator
- Gladys Pyle (1890–1989), South Dakota politician
- Gregory E. Pyle (1949–2019), Native American politician, Chief of the Choktaw Nation of Oklahoma
- Howard Pyle (1853–1911), American illustrator and writer
- Jack Pyle (1909–1987), American stage magician
- Jeff Pyle (1964–2022), American politician
- Jeff Pyle (ice hockey) (born 1958), American ice hockey player and official
- Joey Pyle (1937–2007), British gangland boss
- John A. Pyle (born 1951), British atmospheric scientist
- John Howard Pyle (1906–1987), 12th governor of Arizona
- John L. Pyle (1860–1902), American attorney and politician
- John M. Pyle (born 1956), American felon convicted for possession of child pornography, formerly businessman and noted ultramarathoner
- Katharine Pyle, (1863–1938), American author, poet, and illustrator
- Katy Pyle, American dancer and choreographer
- Kenneth B. Pyle (born 1936), Historian and professor history
- Mamie Shields Pyle, (1866–1949) American suffragist
- Michael Pyle (economist) (born 1977), American economist and government official
- Mike Pyle (American football) (1939–2015), American football player; brother of Palmer
- Mike Pyle (fighter) (born 1975), American mixed martial arts fighter
- Missi Pyle (born 1972), American actress
- Nancy Pyle (1937/38–2023), American politician
- Nathan W. Pyle (born 1982), American cartoonist
- Nicholas Pyle (born 2000), English swimmer
- Nick Pyle (born ?), British diplomat, High commissioner of the United Kingdom to Botswana, Deputy Governor of Gibraltar
- Palmer Pyle (1937–2021), American football player; brother of Mike (American football)
- Pip Pyle (1950–2006), English drummer
- Richard Pyle (born 1967), diving marine biologist
- Richard Pyle (reporter), AP Saigon bureau chief during the Vietnam War
- Robert Michael Pyle (born 1947), American naturalist
- Ryan Pyle (born 1946), Canadian adventure photographer, television producer, and host
- Steve Pyle, American cyclist
- Steve Pyle (footballer) (born 1963), English footballer
- Thomas Pyle (1674–1756), British clergyman, writer, and religious controversialist
- Tim Pyle (born 1969), American filmmaker and animator
- Tom Pyle (1875–1958), English footballer
- Willis Pyle (1914–2016), American artist and animator
- Wynne Pyle (1881–1971), American concert pianist

== Fictional characters ==
- Alden Pyle, fictional character from the novel The Quiet American by Graham Greene
- Gomer Pyle, fictional character from the sitcom The Andy Griffith Show
- Goober Pyle, fictional character from the sitcom The Andy Griffith Show

== See also ==
- Pyle, Wales
- Pile (disambiguation)
- Pile (surname), a similar surname
- Pyles, a similar surname
