= Pile (surname) =

Pile is an English language surname. Notable people named Pile include

- Archibald Pile (died 1898), Bajan landowner
- Chris Pile, multiple individuals with the same name
- Sir Francis Pile, 2nd Baronet (c. 1617–1649), English politician
- General Sir Frederick Alfred Pile, 2nd Baronet and a British army officer who served in both World Wars
- James Pile (c. 1799–1885), Australian pastoralist

- Pile brothers, his sons William, John and Charles, pastoralists and racehorse owners

- William Pile (shipbuilder) (1822–1893), pioneer of composite clipper ship construction
- William A. Pile (1829–1889), US politician and minister from Missouri

== See also ==
- Pile (disambiguation)
- Pyle (surname)
- Pyles (surname)
