= Pile =

Pile or Piles may refer to:

== Architecture ==
- Pile, a type of deep foundation
  - Screw piles, used for building deep foundations
  - Pile bridge, structure that uses foundations consisting of long poles
  - Pile lighthouse, a type of skeletal lighthouse, used primarily in Florida, US, and in Australia
    - Screw-pile lighthouse, a lighthouse that stands on piles screwed into sandy or muddy sea or river bottoms

== Energy ==
- Atomic pile, early term for a nuclear reactor, typically one constructed of graphite
- Charcoal pile, a structure from wood and turf for production of charcoal
- Voltaic pile, first modern electric battery
- Thermoelectric pile, a device that converts heat into electricity

== People ==
People with the name Pile:

- Pile (surname)
- Pile (singer) (born 1988), Japanese voice actress and singer, born Eriko Hori

People with the name Piles:

- Roger de Piles (1636–1709), French art theorist
- Samuel H. Piles (1858–1940), American politician, attorney, and diplomat
- Gerasim Pileš (1913–2003), Soviet Chuvash writer, playwright, sculptor, and painter

== Places ==
=== Europe ===
- Piles, Valencia, a commune in the province of Valence, in Spain
- Cinq-Mars-la-Pile, a commune of Indre-et-Loire, in the central region of France
- Les Piles, a commune in the comarca of Conca de Barberà, in the province of Tarragona, in Spain
- Port-de-Piles, a commune in Centre-West in France
- Windscale Piles, a former pair of nuclear reactors in Cumberland, England

=== North America ===
- Grandes-Piles, Quebec, municipality in Mékinac Regional County Municipality, in Mauricie, Québec, Canada
- Saint-Jean-des-Piles, Quebec, a past municipality and a sector of Shawinigan City in Québec, Canada
- Piles Creek, a stream in Union County, New Jersey, United States
- The Chicago Pile-1, the world's first artificial nuclear fission reactor
- The Pile, a common nickname for the ruins of the World Trade Center site, following the 11 September 2001 attacks

== Other uses ==
- Pile (abstract data type)
- Pile (band), an American indie rock band
- Pile (heraldry), an ordinary in heraldry, a downward-pointing triangle
- Pile (textile), fabric with raised surface made of upright loops or strands of yarn
  - Carpet pile
- "Piles", a common name for hemorrhoids
- Rubble pile, in astronomy, an object consisting of individual pieces of rock that have coalesced under gravity
- The Pile (dataset), a machine learning dataset

== See also ==
- Piling (disambiguation)
- Heap (disambiguation)
- Pilae stacks
- Pyle (surname)
- Pyles (surname)
