= Andrew Pyle =

Andrew Pyle may refer to:

- Andrew Pyle (philosopher) (born 1955), British philosopher
- Andrew Pyle (economist) (born 1963), Canadian economist
- Andy Pyle (born 1946), musician
