= River Delta Law Firm =

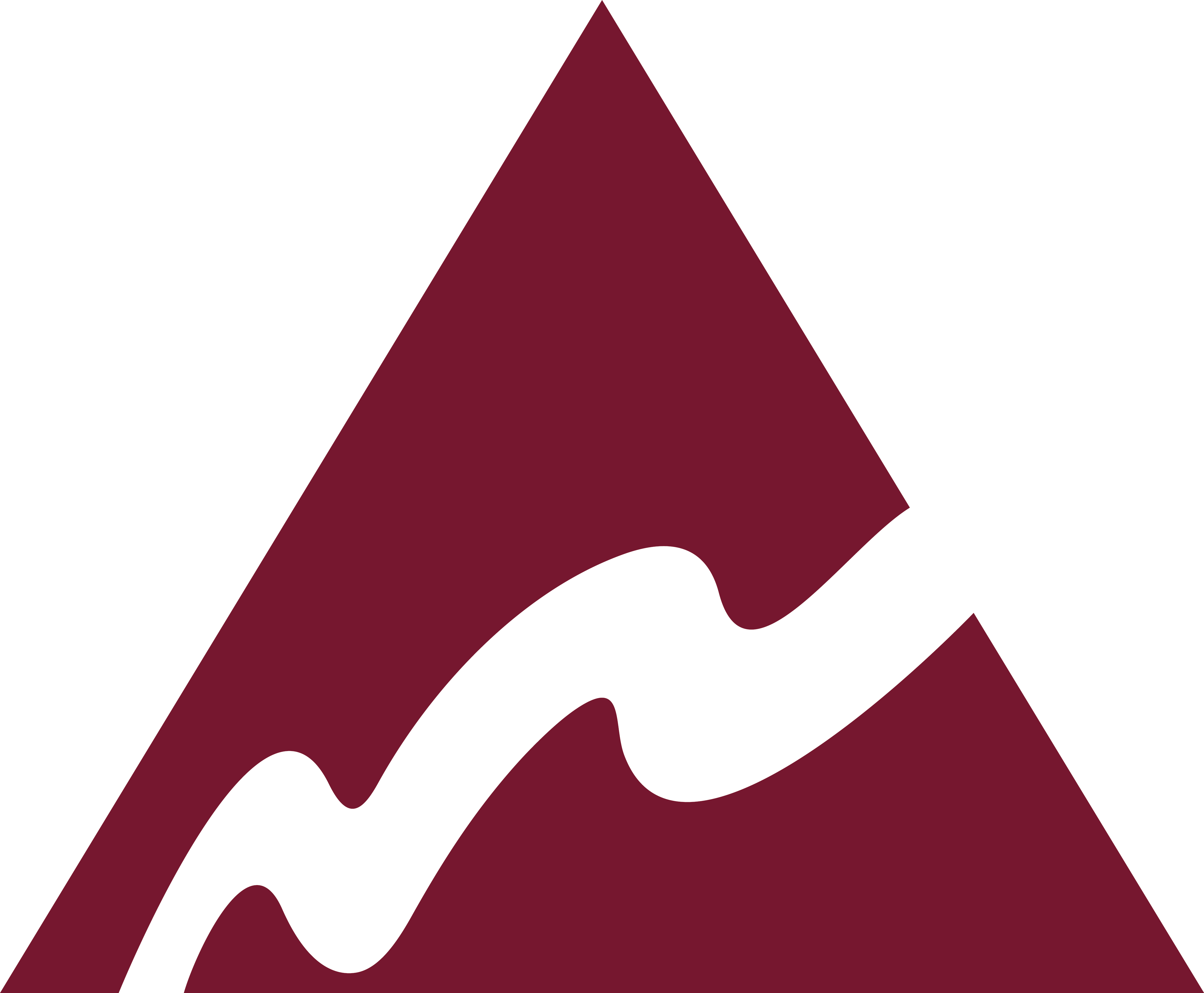
- Headquarters: World Plaza, 855 South Pudong Road, Shanghai, China
- No. of offices: 9
- Offices: Shanghai, Beijing, Suzhou, Shenzhen, Chengdu, Ningbo, Tianjin, Chongqing, USA Bay Area
- No. of attorneys: 166
- No. of employees: 200
- Major practice areas: Labor & Employment Law, Intellectual Property Law, Compliance & Anti-Fraud, Investment
- Key people: Jingbo 'Jason' Lu (Founding Partner), Shen Jun (Vice President)
- Date founded: 2004
- Founder: Jingbo 'Jason' Lu
- Website: www.jsjlawyer.com

River Delta Law Firm (Chinese: 江三角律师事务所) is an international law firm, headquartered in Shanghai. It was formed in 2004 by Founding Partner, Jingbo 'Jason' Lu. The firm currently employs over 160 lawyers across 10 offices in two countries and claims specialization in: "Labor & Employment Law, M&A & Liquidation, Anti-corruption & Compliance, Intellectual Property and Dispute Resolution."

== Activity ==
River Delta Law Firm is a member of the 'Innangard' International Employment Law Alliance. Membership consists of a number of firms who specialize in employment law from around Europe and Asia. The firm is also a member of the American Bar Association, the Inter-Pacific Bar Association, International Bar Association, The Australian Chamber of Commerce and The Canadian Chamber of Commerce.

== Achievements ==
- Chambers & Partners recognized River Delta Law Firm as a 'Band 1 PRC Firm' for Employment Law.
- Legal 500 ranked River Delta Law Firm as 'Tier 1 PRC Firm' for Labor and Employment Law.
- Asia Law ranked River Delta Law Firm as 'Outstanding' in the area of Labor and Employment Law.

== Awards ==
- China Law & Practice Award 2017: River Delta Law Firm was the 2017 'East China Winner' for the 'Regional China Firms of the Year' award. Jingbo 'Jason' Lu was also named 'Lawyer of the Year' in the area of Labor and Employment Law.
