= Amy Butcher =

American writer and essayist

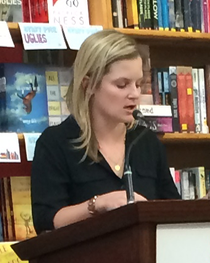
Amy Butcher in 2017

Amy Butcher is an American writer and essayist. Her memoir, Mothertrucker, was published from Amazon Publishing literary press Little A Books in 2022. Her first book, Visiting Hours: A Memoir of Friendship and Murder, was published in 2015. In August 2019, Makeready Films announced a film adaptation of Mothertrucker will be produced and directed by Joey Soloway and will star Julianne Moore. In February 2020, the Ohio State Arts Council awarded excerpts of Mothertrucker an Individual Excellence Award. In February 2024, the Ohio State Arts Council awarded excerpts of her new book an Individual Excellence Award.

== Early life and education ==
Butcher grew up outside of Philadelphia, Pennsylvania. She received her BA from Gettysburg College and her MFA from the University of Iowa's Nonfiction Writing Program. She currently serves as an associate professor of English at Denison University.

== Career ==
=== Writing ===
Butcher's debut memoir, Visiting Hours: A Memoir of Friendship and Murder, was published in April 2015 by Penguin-Random House imprint Blue Rider Press. It recounts her struggle to reconcile her friendship with her college friend Kevin Schaeffer, who violently murdered his girlfriend after a psychotic break. The book was featured on NPR's Weekend Edition Sunday with Rachel Martin, WAMC's The Roundtable, and Poets & Writers Magazine. The New York Times Sunday Review of Books said that "at the heart of this story, beyond Butcher's search to understand the incomprehensible, lies our societal failure to recognize serious depression as the potentially fatal illness that it is..." and that "her research offers a tragic portrait of the turn of events that left one young woman dead and another forever changed." The Los Angeles Review of Books says that the structuring and manipulation of sensitive yet pertinent information throughout "feels insensitive, not to say irresponsible, to manipulate the reader thus...Leaving out what she knows in order to build suspense prevents her from investigating themes that might have layered this work with meaning and texture...by the time a sense of self-awareness swells, in the epilogue, the reader isn't sure the narrator can be trusted. That being so, she has failed herself and her reader as well."

Butcher's March 2016 opinion piece, "Emoji Feminism", published in The Times Sunday Review, was cited by Google as the inspiration for thirteen new professional female-empowered emojis, accepted in July 2016 by the Unicode Emoji Subcommittee and released in December 2016. In August 2017, these emojis were nominated as Design of the Year by the Design Museum in London, where they are on display alongside a hijab designed by Nike, Wolfgang Tillmans' Remain Campaign for the Brexit referendum and items from Kanye West's clothing line, among other artifacts.

Butcher's second book, Mothertrucker, was released by Little A Books in November 2021 and subsequently announced as an Amazon First Reads selection and an editor's pick in memoir. The book earned critical praise from Publishers Weekly, Kirkus Reviews, The Wall Street Journal, Good Morning America, CBS News, NPR's All Sides Weekend, Chicago Review of Books, Oxford Review of Books, Washington Independent Review of Books, Booklist, and others. Publishers Weekly wrote, "In this tender and gripping tale, essayist Butcher (Visiting Hours) recounts her unlikely adventure through Alaska with the country's only female ice trucker, the late Joy 'Mothertrucker' Wiebe... Along the way, Butcher explores myriad issues with nuance and grace, including Indigenous rights, violence against women, religious hypocrisy, and environmental concerns. It's a trip readers won't soon forget." Kirkus Reviews called the book "a searching and deeply empathetic memoir", writing, "[Mothertrucker is] a sobering reflection on verbal and psychological abuse [that] honors the healing power of female friendship and questions the nature of divinity beyond its constricting patriarchal manifestations." The Wall Street Journal called Mothertrucker "a rattling good story" that is "shot through with poignant insights." In September 2021, Butcher published a companion essay, "I Know All Too Well How A Lovely Relationship Can Descend Into Abuse," about the Gabby Petito murder, as a guest essay in the New York Times. In August 2019, Makeready Films announced they will be producing a film adaptation directed by Joey Soloway and starring Julianne Moore. In February 2020, the Ohio Arts Council awarded excerpts of Mothertrucker an Individual Excellence Award, calling the project "well researched," "very well-written," and "a positive antidote to the trauma of violence against women."

Butcher's additional essays have been published in Granta, The New York Times, The Washington Post, Harper's Magazine, The Paris Review, Literary Hub, The Kenyon Review, The Iowa Review, The American Scholar, Salon and Guernica. Her May 2018 essay, "Women These Days," was listed as a "Best of 2018" essay by Entropy Magazine and nominated for a Pushcart Prize and for inclusion in the Best American Essays series by the editors at Brevity Magazine. Her February 2018 Lit Hub essay "MIA: The Liberal Men We Love" was featured in Rebecca Traister's book Good And Mad: The Revolutionary Power of Women's Anger. Her December 2018 essay, "Flight Path," was awarded grand prize in Sonora Reviews 2018 flash prose contest as judged by Nicole Walker. Of the essay, Walker writes, "Referencing cultural touchstones as diverse W.H. Auden and Jeopardy, this piece stacks everything we thought we knew about Icarus and Daedalus and then piles more on. The images of the would-be immigrants tucked into the wheelhouses of airplanes makes those thick stories immediate. Too immediate and hard to hear, but necessary. The final stark image of not wax but metal becomes a hot, stark mirror."

Additional essays have been anthologized in The Best Travel Writing 2016, The Soul Of A Great Traveler, Beautiful Flesh: A Body of Essays, Writing True: The Art and Craft of Creative Nonfiction and The Best Of Vela. Her essays have also been awarded notable distinctions in the 2015, 2016, 2017, 2018, 2020, and 2021 editions of the Best American Essays series.

In February 2024, the Ohio Arts Council awarded excerpts of her new book an Individual Excellence Award. Butcher said the portion of the book that was evaluated as part of the award consideration is "a story of human rights as they relate to women and girls, specifically."

=== Teaching ===
Butcher has held teaching fellowships or visiting writer positions at the University of Iowa, Colgate University, Johns Hopkins University, George Mason University, Ohio State University, Indiana University Purdue University of Indianapolis, Old Dominion University, Wells College, Mount Mercy University, Casper College's Annual Literary Conference, the 49th Writers Tutka Bay Writers Retreat, the Endless Arts in Eagles Mere Festival, the Conversations and Connections Conference, the Iowa Summer Writing Festival and the Sitka Fine Arts Camp in Sitka, Alaska.

Butcher has received grants and awards from Colgate University, the Kimmel Harding Nelson Center for the Arts, and the Ohio State Arts Council.

She currently serves as an associate professor of English at Denison University, where she teaches creative writing, and formerly held positions as the director of creative writing and an associate professor of English at Ohio Wesleyan University. She spends her summers teaching writing at the Iowa Summer Writing Festival in Iowa City, Iowa and the Sitka Fine Arts Camp in Sitka, Alaska.

== Awards and honors ==
- 2014 Iowa Review Award in Nonfiction
- 2015 Best American Essays Notable Essay
- 2016 Solas Award for best travel writing
- 2016 Best American Essays Notable Essay
- 2017 Best American Essays Notable Essay
- 2018 Best American Essays Notable Essay
- Nomination for Best American Essays 2019 by the editors of Brevity Magazine
- 2018 Pushcart Prize Nomination by the editors of Brevity Magazine
- 2018 Best Essays of 2018 by Entropy Magazine
- 2018 Sonora Review's Flash Prose Award
- 2018 The Sonora Review Flash Prose Contest judged by Nicole Walker
- 2020 Individual Excellence Award from the Ohio State Arts Council
- 2021 Best American Essays Notable Essay
- 2024 Individual Excellence Award from the Ohio State Arts Council
