= John Pyle =

John Pyle may refer to:

- John A. Pyle (born 1951), British atmospheric scientist
- John Howard Pyle (1906–1987), American broadcaster and politician
- John L. Pyle (1860–1902), attorney and politician from the state of South Dakota
- John M. Pyle (born 1956), American criminal, former businessman, and noted ultramarathoner
