= Terry Pyles =

American artist

Terry Pyles is an Alaskan artist whose work includes depictions of the sights and scenery in the state. He makes sculptures and paints.

Pyles painted a still life depicting fellow artist Dave Rubin surrounded by a bounty of Alaskan fish after being inspired by Alejandro de Loarte’s painting "The Kitchen" (1610) at Rijksmuseum in Amsterdam. The Rasmuson Foundation funded the acquisition of one of his paintings to donate it to a museum in 2004.

His public sculptures include mosaic tile toppers on dock pilings that were inspired by architecture in Barcelona. They were made in collaboration with Dave Rubin. He created an NOAA fisheries poster with Ray Troll. He and Kroll also collaborated on an interactive piece titled Spawn-O-Rama based on Plinko at the Sitka Sound Science Center.

Pyles has collaborated with fellow Ketchikan artist Ray Troll. Pyles also created a salmon sculpture on Ketchikan Creek to replace a wooden one by local carver Jones Yeltatzie (born 1897), a Haida, that had deteriorated.
