= Canada Day =

Canadian national holiday on July 1

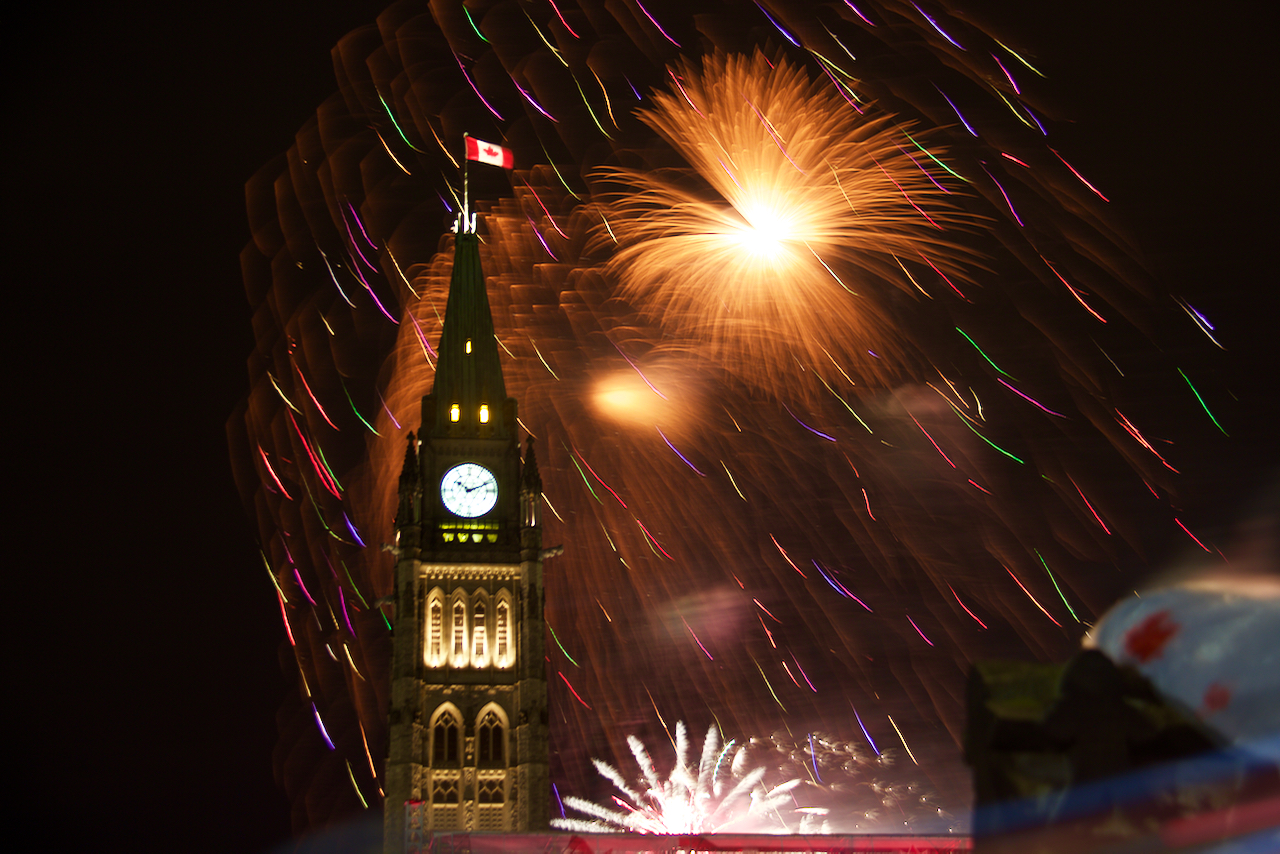
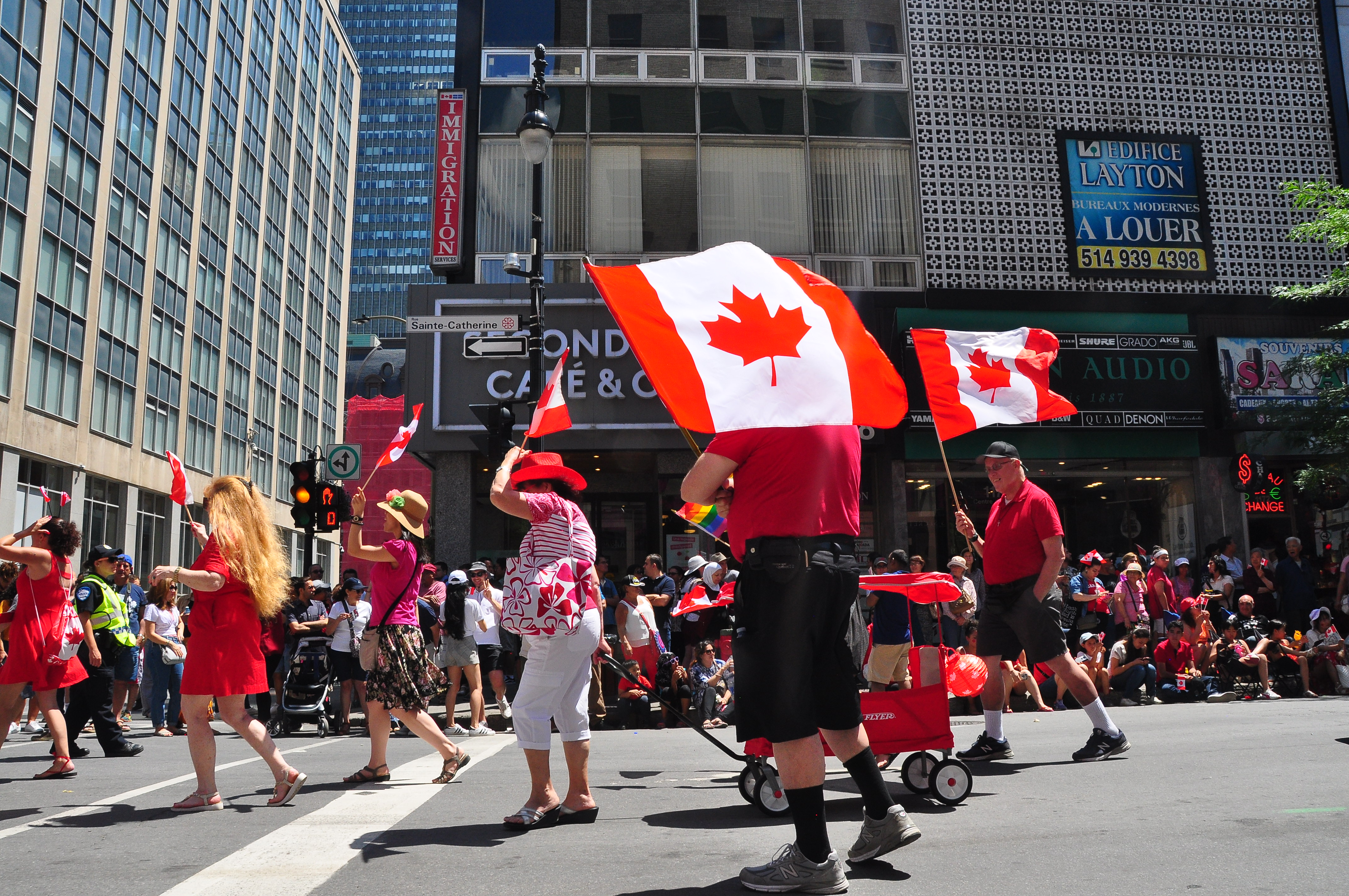
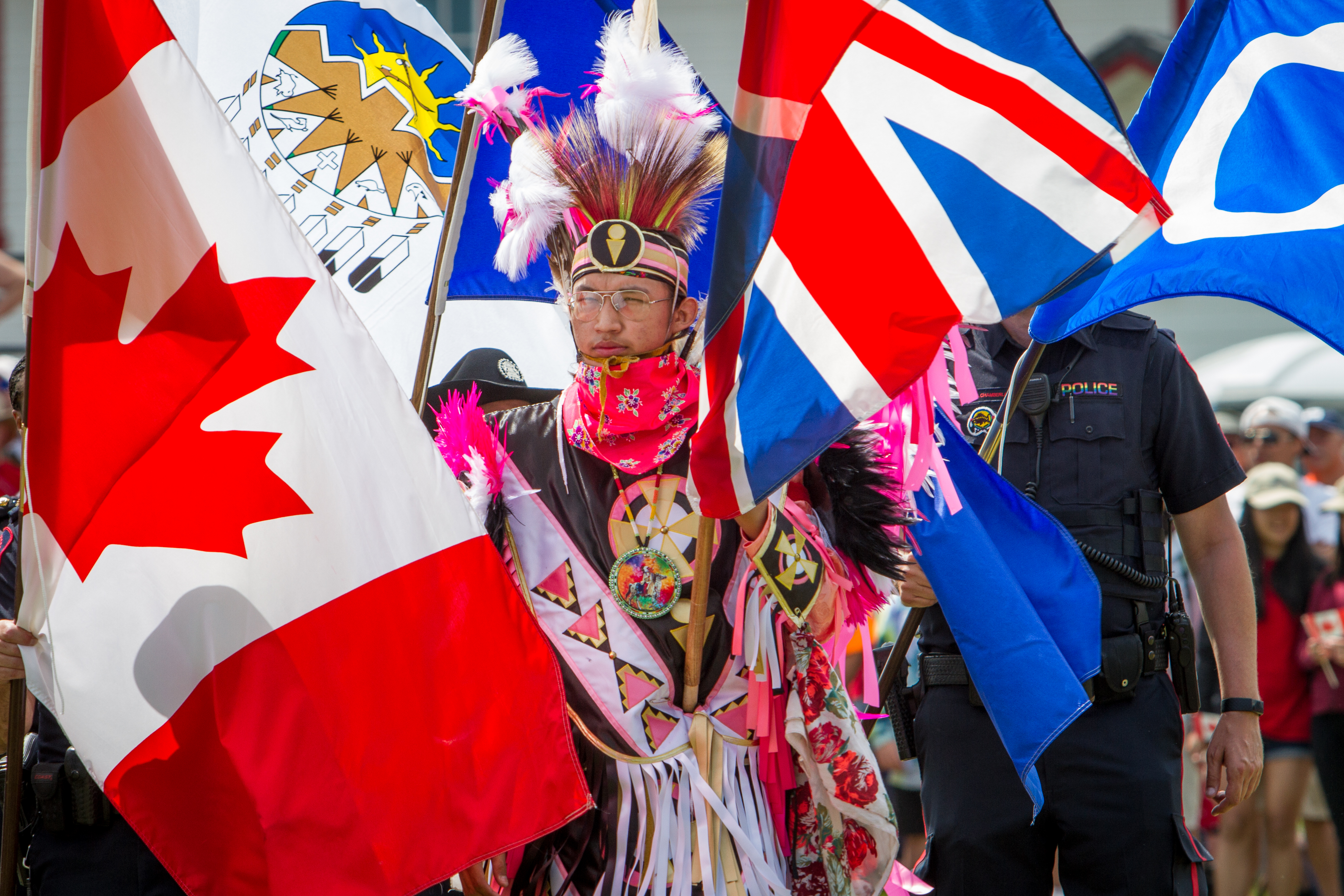
- From top, left to right: Canada Day Fireworks display on Parliament Hill, in Ottawa; a Canada Day parade in Montreal; a member of Canada's First Nations with a national flag and Royal Union Flag at Canada Day celebrations in Calgary
- Also called: Fête du Canada; Dominion Day (1879–1982)
- Observed by: Canada
- Type: Historical, cultural, national
- Significance: Anniversary of Canadian Confederation on July 1, 1867
- Celebrations: Fireworks, parades, barbecues, concerts, carnivals, fairs, picnics, festivals
- Date: July 1
- Frequency: Annual
- First time: July 1, 1867 (159 years ago)

Canada Day (Note: French: Fête du Canada, lit. 'Feast of Canada', local pronunciation: [fɛɪ̯t dzy kanadɑ]) is the national day of Canada. A federal statutory holiday, it celebrates the anniversary of Canadian Confederation which occurred on July 1, 1867, when the three separate colonies of the United Canadas (Ontario and Quebec), Nova Scotia, and New Brunswick were united into a single dominion within the British Empire called Canada.

Originally called Dominion Day, (Note: French: Fête du Dominion, lit. 'Feast of the Dominion') the holiday was renamed in 1982, the same year that the Canadian constitution was patriated by the Canada Act, 1982, which severed the vestiges of legal dependence on the Parliament of the United Kingdom. Canada Day celebrations take place throughout the country, as well as in various locations around the world attended by Canadians living abroad.

== Commemoration ==
Canada Day is often informally referred to as "Canada's birthday", particularly in the popular press. However, the term "birthday" can be seen as an oversimplification, as Canada Day is the anniversary of only one important national milestone on the way to the country's full sovereignty, namely the joining on July 1, 1867, of the United Province of Canada (Canada West became Ontario while Canada East became Quebec), Nova Scotia, and New Brunswick into a wider British federation of four provinces. Canada became a "kingdom in its own right" within the British Empire, and was commonly known then as the Dominion of Canada. (Note: Canadian representatives had actually requested the title Kingdom of Canada be granted, to "fix the monarchical basis of the constitution", but the idea was vetoed by the British Foreign Secretary at the time, the Lord Stanley, and the title dominion was used in its place. See Name of Canada § Adoption of Dominion.)

Although a British dominion, Canada gained an increased level of political control and governance over its own affairs, the British parliament and cabinet maintaining political control over certain areas, such as foreign affairs, national defence, and constitutional changes. Canada gradually gained increasing sovereignty over the years—notably with the passage of the Statute of Westminster in 1931—until finally becoming completely sovereign with the passing of the Constitution Act, 1982, which served to fully patriate the Canadian constitution.

Under the federal Holidays Act, Canada Day is observed on July 1, unless that date falls on a Sunday, in which case July 2 is the statutory holiday. Celebratory events will generally still take place on July 1, even though it is not the legal holiday. If it falls on a weekend, businesses normally closed that day will usually dedicate the following Monday as a day off.

== History ==
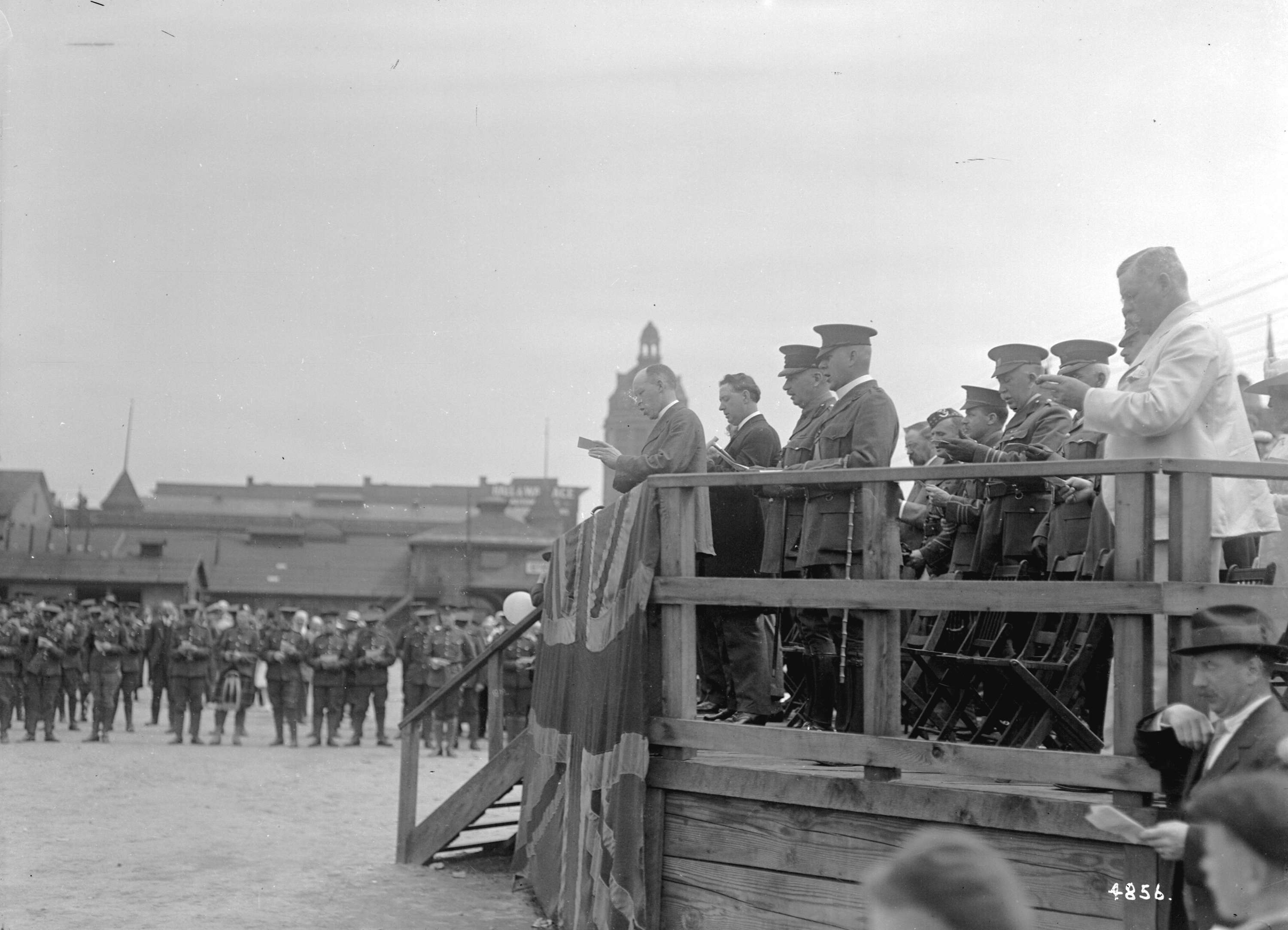
A crowd in Vancouver celebrates Dominion Day in 1917, the golden jubilee of Confederation

The enactment of the British North America Act, 1867 (today called the Constitution Act, 1867), which confederated Canada, was celebrated on July 1, 1867, with the ringing of the bells at the Cathedral Church of St James in Toronto and "bonfires, fireworks, and illuminations, excursions, military displays, and musical and other entertainments", as described in contemporary accounts. On June 20 of the following year, Governor General the Viscount Monck issued a royal proclamation asking for Canadians to celebrate the anniversary of Confederation, However, the holiday was not established statutorily until May 15, 1879, when it was designated as Dominion Day, alluding to the reference in the British North America Act to the country as a dominion. The holiday was initially not dominant in the national calendar; any celebrations were mounted by local communities and the governor general hosted a party at Rideau Hall. No larger celebrations were held until 1917, and then none again for a further decade—the gold and diamond anniversaries of Confederation, respectively.

In 1946, Philéas Côté, a Quebec member of the House of Commons, introduced a private member's bill to rename Dominion Day as Canada Day. The bill was passed quickly by the lower chamber but was stalled by the Senate, which returned it to the commons with the recommendation that the holiday be renamed The National Holiday of Canada, an amendment that effectively killed the bill.

The Canadian government began in 1958 to orchestrate Dominion Day celebrations. That year, then-Prime Minister John Diefenbaker requested that Secretary of State Ellen Fairclough organize appropriate events, with a budget of $14,000. Parliament was traditionally in session on July 1, but Fairclough persuaded Diefenbaker and the rest of the federal cabinet to attend. Official celebrations thereafter consisted usually of trooping the colour ceremonies on Parliament Hill in the afternoon and evening, followed by a mass band concert and fireworks display. Fairclough, who became Minister of Citizenship and Immigration, later expanded the bills to include performing folk and ethnic groups. The day also became more casual and family oriented.

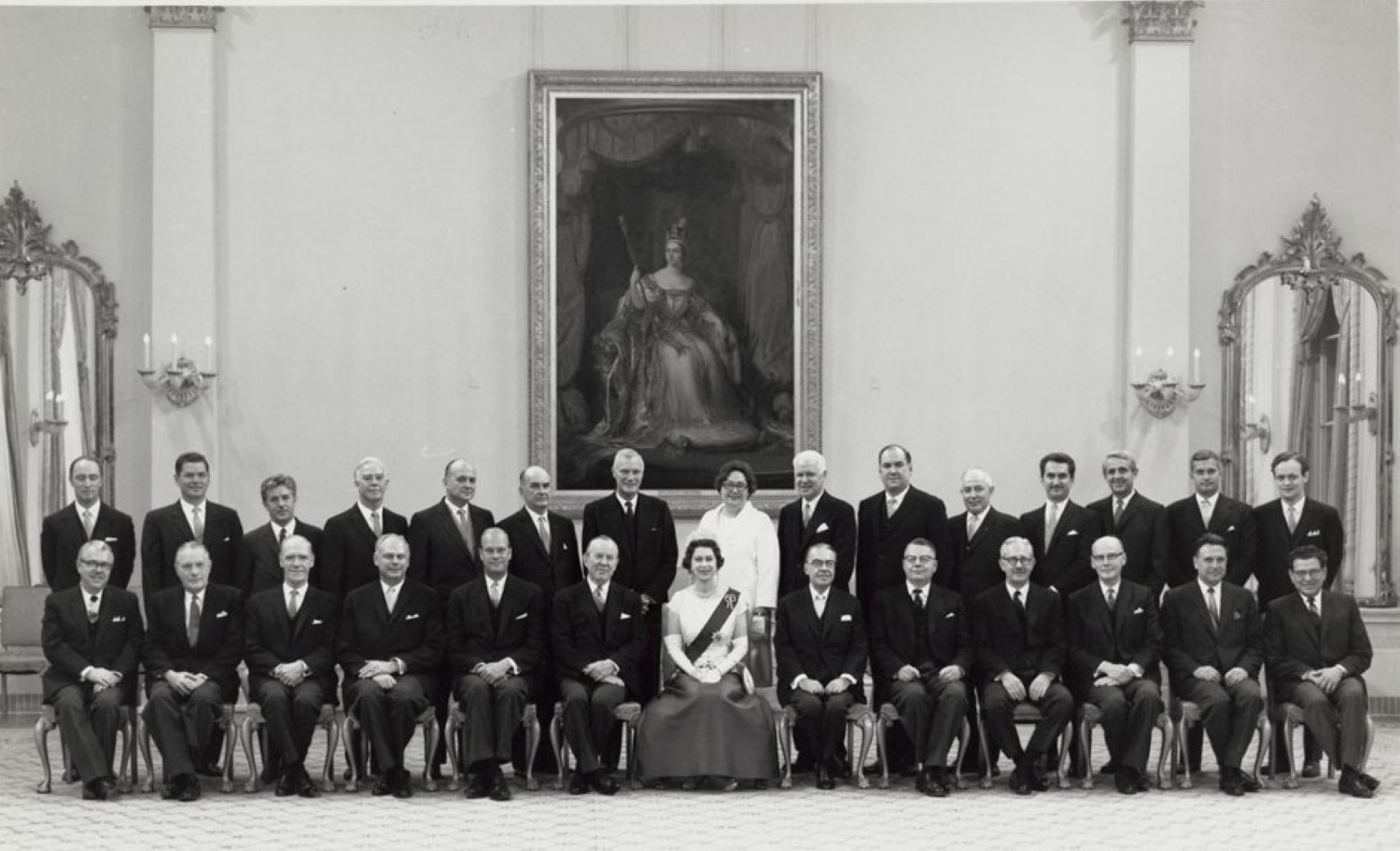
Elizabeth II, Queen of Canada, with her cabinet, including Prime Minister Lester B. Pearson, in the ballroom of Rideau Hall, Ottawa, on Dominion Day, 1967, the centennial of Confederation

Canada's centennial in 1967 is often seen as an important milestone in the history of Canadian nationalism and in Canada's maturing as a distinct, independent country, after which Dominion Day became more popular with average Canadians. Into the late 1960s, nationally televised, multi-cultural concerts held in Ottawa were added and the fête became known as Festival Canada. After 1980, the Canadian government began to promote celebrating Dominion Day beyond the national capital, giving grants and aid to cities across the country to help fund local activities.

Some Canadians were, by the early 1980s, informally referring to the holiday as Canada Day, (Note: Numerous references to Canada Day may be found in issues of The Globe and Mail published in the late 1970s.) a practice that caused some controversy: Proponents argued that the name Dominion Day was a holdover from the colonial era—an argument given some impetus by the patriation of the Canadian constitution in 1982—and others asserted that an alternative was needed as the term does not translate well into French. Conversely, numerous politicians, journalists, and authors, such as Robertson Davies, decried the change at the time and some continue to maintain that it was illegitimate and an unnecessary break with tradition. Others claimed dominion was widely misunderstood and conservatively inclined commenters saw the change as part of a much larger attempt by Liberals to "re-brand" or re-define Canadian history. Columnist Andrew Cohen called Canada Day a term of "crushing banality" and criticized it as "a renunciation of the past [and] a misreading of history, laden with political correctness and historical ignorance".

The holiday was officially renamed as a result of a private member's bill that was passed through the House of Commons on July 9, 1982, two years after its first reading. Only 12 members of parliament were present when the bill was taken up again, 8 fewer than the necessary quorum; however, according to parliamentary rules, the quorum is enforceable only at the start of a sitting or when a member calls attention to it. The group passed the bill in five minutes, without debate, inspiring "grumblings about the underhandedness of the process". It met with stronger resistance in the Senate. Ernest Manning argued that the rationale for the change was based on a misperception of the name and George McIlraith did not agree with the manner in which the bill was passed, urging the government to proceed in a more "dignified way". However, the Senate did eventually pass the bill, regardless. With the granting of royal assent, the holiday's name was officially changed to Canada Day on October 27, 1982, and first celebrated under that name July 1, 1983.

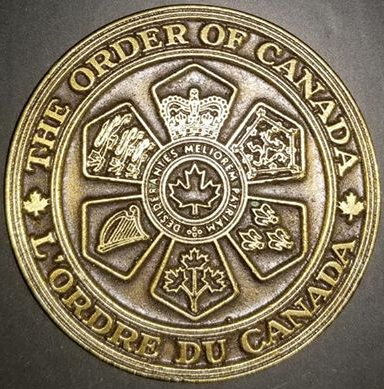
The Sovereign's seal of the Order of Canada, a state order inaugurated on July 1, 1967

As the anniversary of Confederation, Dominion Day, and later Canada Day, was the date set for a number of important events, such as the first national radio network hookup by the Canadian National Railway (1927); the inauguration of the Canadian Broadcasting Corporation's cross-country television broadcast, with Governor General Vincent Massey's Dominion Day speech from Parliament Hill (1958); the flooding of the Saint Lawrence Seaway (1958); the first colour television transmission in Canada (1966); the inauguration of the Order of Canada (1967); and the establishment of "O Canada" as the country's national anthem (1980). During Canada's sesquicentennial in 2017, the Bank of Canada released a commemorative $10 banknote, which was expected to be broadly available by Canada Day.

The COVID-19 pandemic led to the cancellation in 2020 of all in-person Canada Day festivities nationwide, due to social distancing and restrictions on public gatherings. Some were converted to virtual events. The same cancellations occurred the following year; though, some also due to the discovery of unmarked graves in residential school grounds. In-person festivities in Ottawa returned in 2022, being re-located from Parliament Hill to LeBreton Flats due to construction associated with the Parliament Hill Rehabilitation project.

Other events fell on the same day coincidentally, such as the first day of the Battle of the Somme in 1916—shortly after which Newfoundland recognized July 1 as Memorial Day to commemorate the Newfoundland Regiment's heavy losses during the battle—and the enactment of the Chinese Immigration Act in 1923, leading Chinese-Canadians to refer to July 1 as Humiliation Day (Chinese: 僑恥日; pinyin: Qiáo Chǐ Rì) and boycott Dominion Day celebrations with shop closures, flying the Canadian flag on half-mast, or hanging wreaths in front of home and shop entrances until the act was repealed in 1947. Canada Day also coincides with Quebec's Moving Day, when many fixed-lease apartment rental terms expire. The bill changing the province's moving day from May 1 to July 1 was introduced by a federalist member of the Quebec National Assembly, Jérôme Choquette, in 1973, in order not to affect children still in school in the month of May.

== Activities ==
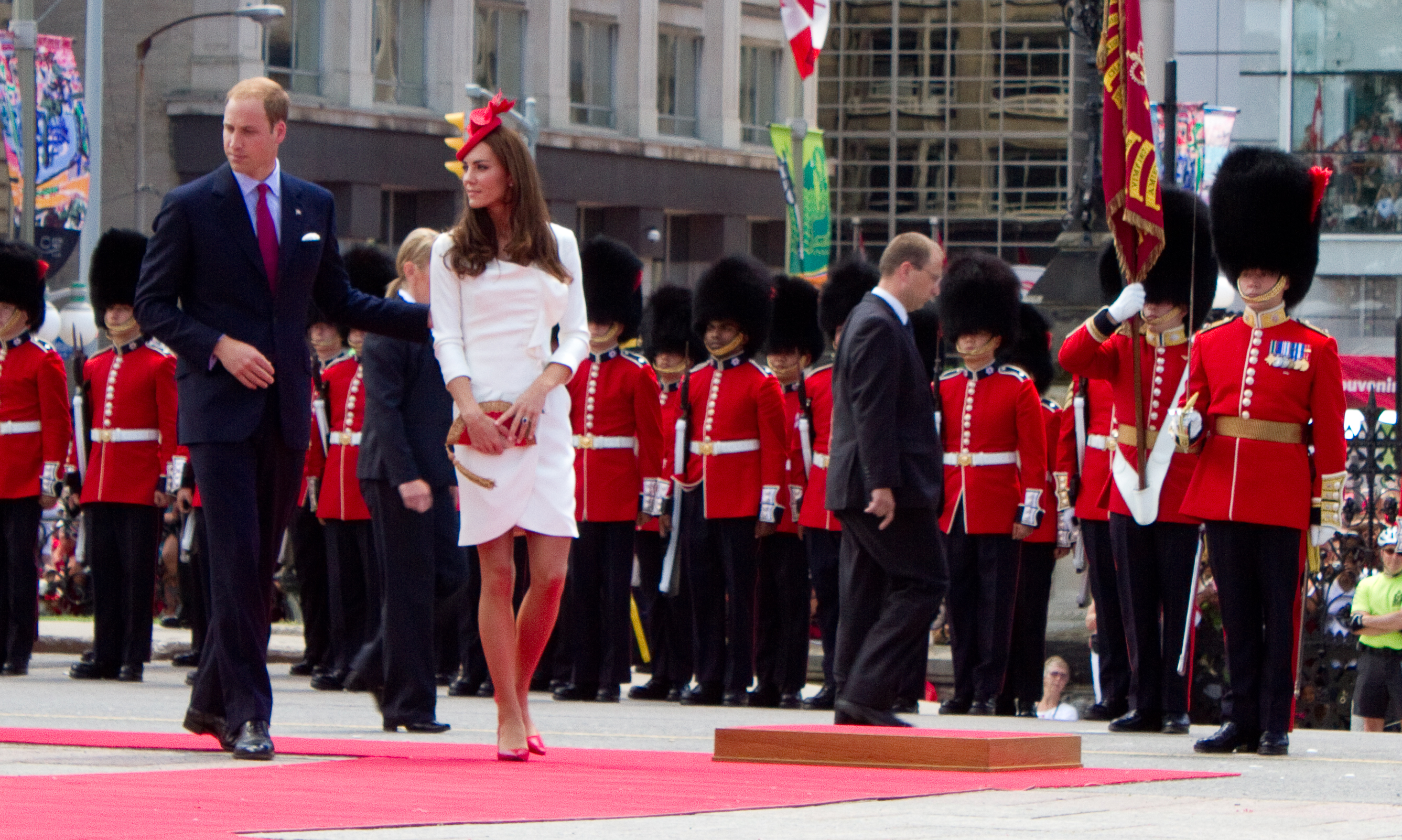
The Duke and Duchess of Cambridge at the official Canada Day celebration in Ottawa, 2011

Most communities across the country host organized celebrations for Canada Day, typically outdoor public events, such as parades, carnivals, festivals, barbecues, air and maritime shows, fireworks, and free musical concerts, as well as citizenship ceremonies. There is no standard mode of celebration for Canada Day; Jennifer Welsh, a professor of International Relations at the University of Oxford, said about this: "Canada Day, like the country, is endlessly decentralized. There doesn't seem to be a central recipe for how to celebrate it—chalk it up to the nature of the federation."

In the national capital of Ottawa, concerts and cultural displays are held on the front lawn of Parliament Hill, as organized by Canadian Heritage, which include the main "noon show" and an evening programme. The event traditionally begins with the singing of the royal anthem "God Save the King" and the national anthem "O Canada" in English and French followed by a flyover by the Snowbirds. Typically the governor general and prime minister officiate, though the monarch or another member of the royal family may also attend or take the governor general's place. (Note: Queen Elizabeth II was present for the official Canada Day ceremonies in Ottawa during Canada's centennial in 1967; as well as 1973, 1990, 1992, 1997, and 2010, when more than 100,000 people attended the ceremonies on Parliament Hill. Prince William and his wife took part in the events in Ottawa for Canada Day, 2011, the first time a member of the royal family other than the monarch and her consort had done so. Several members have also attended Canada Day ceremonies outside of Ottawa, including Charles, Prince of Wales, attending celebrations in Edmonton in 1983. Charles later attended official Canada Day celebrations in Ottawa as a part of 150th anniversary of Canada in 2017.) Smaller events are mounted in other parks around the city and in neighbouring Gatineau, Quebec. In provincial capitals, official celebrations are often held at the provincial legislative building, usually in the presence of the lieutenant-governor or premier of the province.

=== International celebrations ===
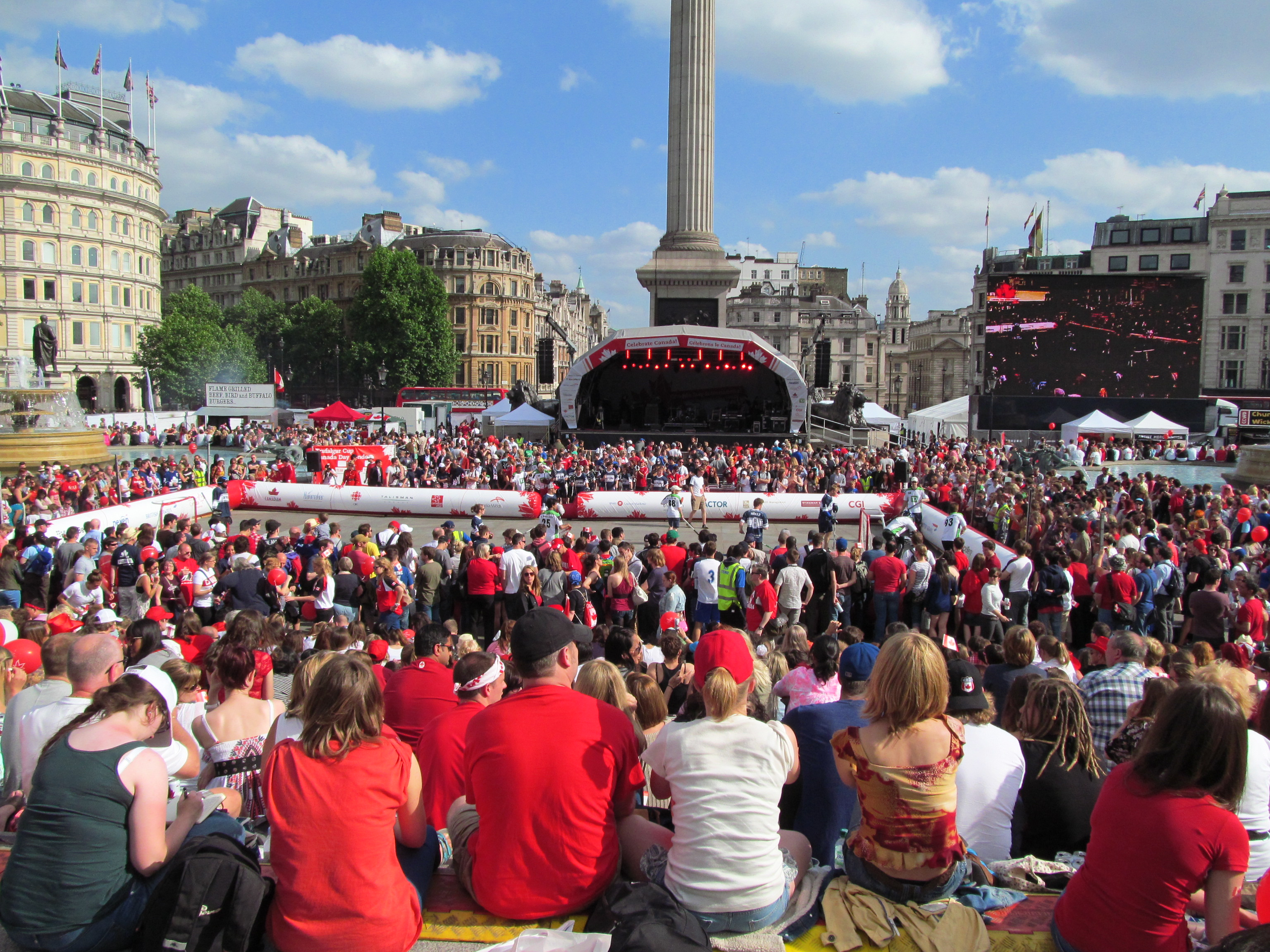
Trafalgar Square during Canada Day in London, England, 2013

Canadian expatriates will often organize Canada Day activities in their local area on or near the date of the holiday. Examples include Canada D'eh, an annual celebration that takes place on June 30 at Lan Kwai Fong, in Hong Kong; Canadian Forces' events on bases in Afghanistan; at Trafalgar Square outside Canada House in London, England; in Mexico, at the Royal Canadian Legion in Chapala, and at the Canadian Club in Ajijic. In China, Canada Day celebrations are held at the Bund Beach by the Canadian Chamber of Commerce in Shanghai and at the Canadian International School of Beijing, sponsored by the Canada China Business Council.

== Criticism and protest ==
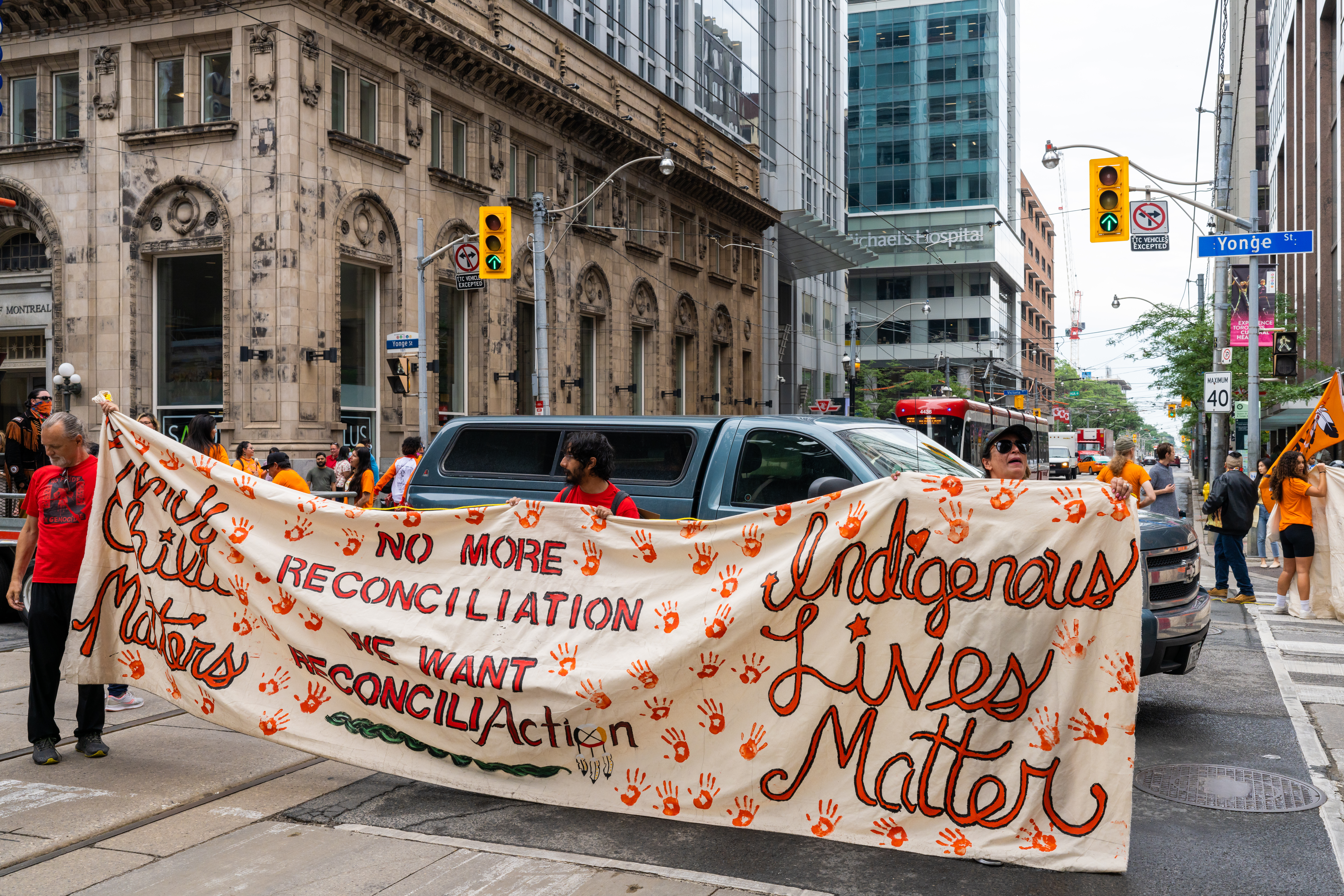
Protesters at an Idle No More rally in Toronto, Ontario, on Canada Day, 2022

Celebrating Canada Day can create tension in Quebec, where it competes with the province's Saint-Jean-Baptiste Day on June 24. The federal government sponsors Canada Day events in Montreal, while the Saint-Jean-Baptiste celebration relies on grassroots support and struggles with funding from the federal government and private sponsors.

Some Indigenous people in Canada view Canada Day negatively, linking it to the injustices they have faced from the Canadian government. This criticism intensified during Canada's 150th anniversary in 2017, as many felt that the celebrations ignored Indigenous contributions and current challenges. Similar concerns arose after the discovery of unmarked graves of Indigenous children at a residential school in British Columbia in June 2021. Canada Day events were cancelled or altered in many areas, and the Indigenous group Idle No More planned peaceful protests in major cities. Some politicians backed the cancellations, while others worried that these actions undermined the concept of Canada and hindered reconciliation efforts.

== See also ==
- Canadian patriotic music
- Culture of Canada
- National Flag of Canada Day
- National symbols of Canada
- Public holidays in Canada
