= Sheldon Jackson College =

Private college in Sitka, Alaska, U.S.

- Active: 1878–2007
- Faculty: 17
- Administrative staff: 18
- Location: 801 Lincoln Street, Sitka, Alaska, United States
- Campus: Rural
- Sheldon Jackson School
- U.S. National Register of Historic Places
- U.S. National Historic Landmark District
- Alaska Heritage Resources Survey
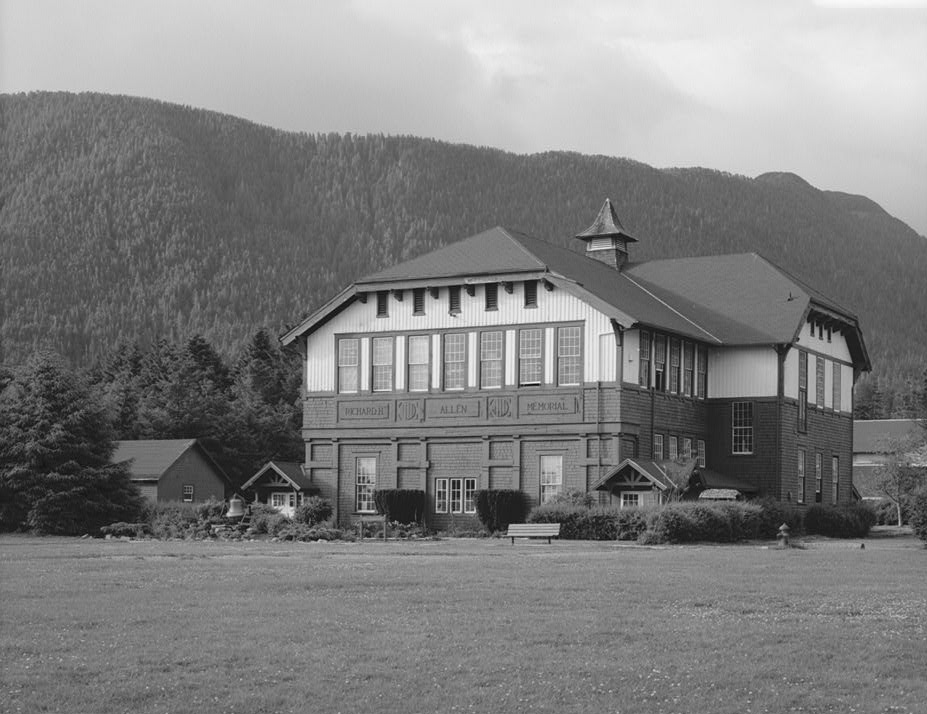
- Richard Allen Memorial Hall on the SJC campus

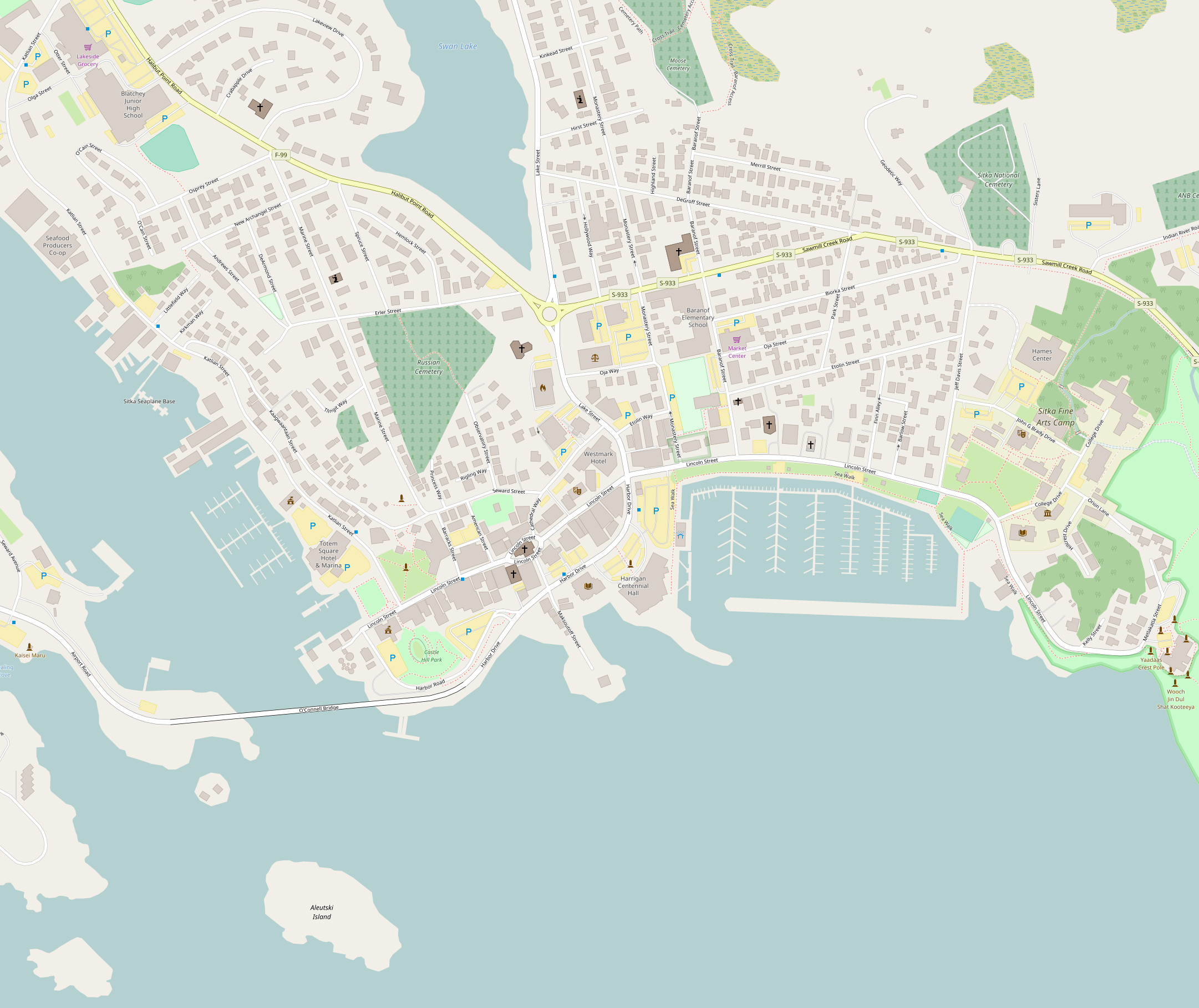
- Location within Downtown Sitka Location within Alaska
- Location: 801 Lincoln Street, Sitka, Alaska
- Coordinates: 57°03′03″N 135°19′25″W
- Area: 13 acres (5.3 ha)
- Built: 1895
- NRHP reference No.: 72000193 (Note: While the form 72000193 contains NHLD designation for the entire school, the asset detail page still reference the original Sheldon Jackson Museum 1972 single-property enlistment.)
- AHRS No.: SIT-026

Significant dates
- Added to NRHP: February 23, 1972
- Designated NHLD: August 7, 2001

Sheldon Jackson College (SJC) was a small private college located on Baranof Island in Sitka, Alaska, United States. Founded in 1878, it was the oldest institution of higher learning in Alaska and maintained a historic relationship with the Presbyterian Church. The college was named in honor of Rev. Sheldon Jackson, an early missionary and educational leader in Alaska.

Due to declining enrollment, the college closed in 2007; four years later, ownership of its campus was transferred to the organization behind the Sitka Fine Arts Camp. In addition to the fine arts camp, the Sheldon Jackson Museum, the Sitka Sound Science Center, the Sitka Summer Music Festival, the Sitka International Hostel, Outer Coast College, and several other organizations are located in buildings on the campus of the former school. The school buildings are part of the Sheldon Jackson School National Historic Landmark District.

== History ==
Similar to the Carlisle Indian School, Sheldon Jackson College (SJC) was initially formed as a "training" school for Alaska Native boys. The school was founded in 1878 by Fannie Kellogg and future Governor of Alaska John G. Brady for the Tlingit people. Initially known as the Sitka Industrial and Training School, it nearly closed in 1882 after its original facility, located over a military barracks, burned down. The Presbyterian missionary Sheldon Jackson came to the rescue of the school, raising funds through a national campaign, leading to the construction of a new building on the site of the present campus. In 1910, after Rev. Jackson died, the school was renamed in his honor.

The institution added a boarding high school in 1917. It was the belief of the school that the native language and culture of their students had no value, and were things that needed to be corrected so their students could advance in society. Students were punished if they spoke in their language. A college program was added in 1944. The college program gained accreditation in 1966 and the high school was closed the following year.

=== Stratton Library ===
Stratton Library was an academic library at the college. Prior to the construction of the building the university's collection was held in the Yaw Building. Prior to the 1955 construction of the Yaw Building, the books were held in a prefabricated army building that had been abandoned and moved onto campus in 1947. The Stratton library building contained 48,000 items in its collection with over 10 percent of all material being directly related to Alaska's history, including many first edition books and rare periodicals. In December 2010 the collection was broken up. Rare glass plate photographic negatives were loaned to the National Park Service, other "Alaskana" was split among local public and academic libraries, and the remainder of the collection was offered for sale to the general public. The building itself was sold to the State of Alaska.

=== Closure ===
The school's educational accreditation was reviewed by the Northwest Commission on Colleges and Universities and State of Alaska, a process that happens nationally with colleges and universities. About this process, President David Dobler said, "SJC's current authorization to operate as an Alaska post-secondary institution has been extended until July 2006, and SJC, at that time, will be required to provide the Alaska Commission on Postsecondary Education (ACPE) with documentation of financial and administrative capacity in order for authorization to be renewed." (Dobler left the office of President in 2002.) Similarly, the college was under a "show cause" order from the Northwest Commission and was required to "show cause" why its regional accreditation should not be revoked.

On June 29, 2007, all academic operations were suspended and all faculty and staff were dismissed due to cash flow shortages. The Board of Trustees gathered all staff and informed them that June 29 would be the final day of employment. They were also informed all health insurance coverage would cease at that time.

On July 17, 2007, the Alaska Commission on Post-secondary Education announced the cancellation of Sheldon Jackson College's authorization to operate a college in Alaska. The college appealed the decision, but was ultimately shut down.

In March 2008, the official website for the school went off-line. In the summer of 2008, the college opened its dorms and facilities for use by local workers and companies.

In 2010 the school library collection of rare books and artwork was boxed and stored.

On February 1, 2011, the Board of Trustees transferred the main campus to Alaska Arts Southeast, Inc., the non-profit parent organization to the Sitka Fine Arts Camp.

== Notable alumni ==
- Benjamin A. Haldane, Tsimshian photographer, musician, businessman
- Byron Mallott, Tlingit leader and rights activist, 12th Lieutenant Governor of Alaska
- Sandra Marbut, Head Coach of women's basketball at California Institute of Technology
- Edward Marsden, Presbyterian minister, Tsimshian activist
- Scott McAdams, mayor of Sitka, U.S. Senate candidate
- Elizabeth Peratrovich, civil rights activist
- Walter Soboleff, Tlingit scholar, Alaska Native Brotherhood Grand President Emeritus

== Architecture and historic designation ==
The Sheldon Jackson Museum was the first building in Alaska built with concrete. Its octagonal shape may have been influenced by architectural philosophies of O.S. Fowler.. In 1972, the Sheldon Jackson Museum building was added as a single property to the National Register of Historic Places.

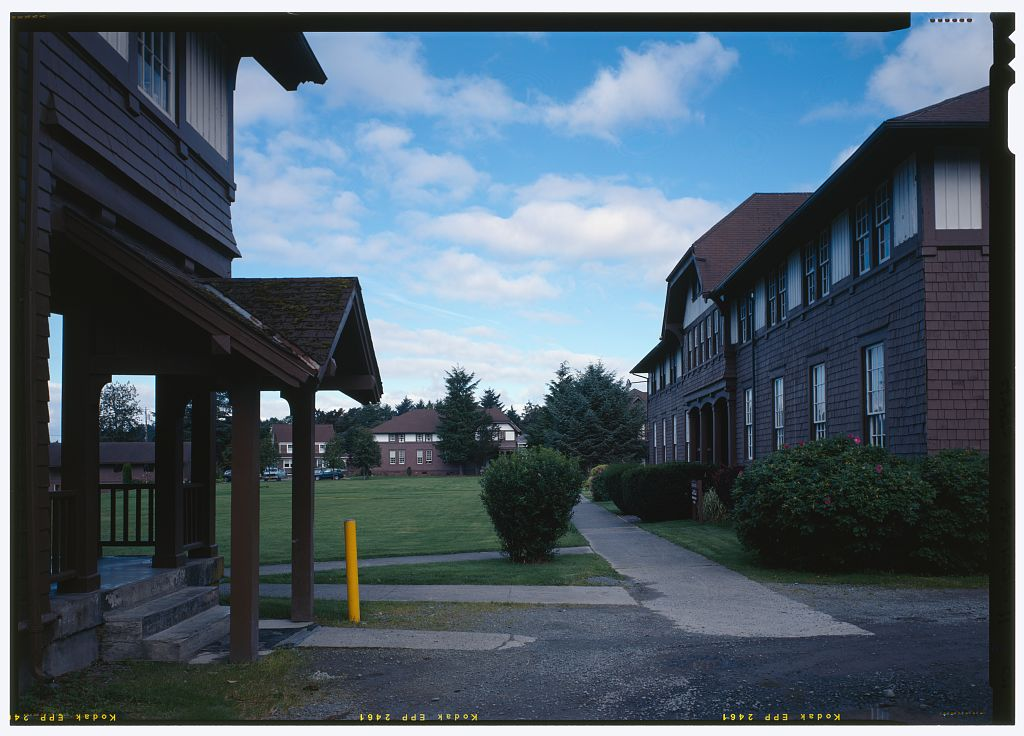
Sheldon Jackson College in summer 1991.

The main campus buildings were designed by the, then just starting, firm of Ludlow and Peabody of Boston with aspects of western stick style. Beams were of Douglas fir and design was kept simple and exposed for easy construction and to demonstrate "honesty in building".

The entire campus, comprising 18 contributing properties and 3 non-contributing buildings, was designated a National Historic Landmark District in 2001.

=== Campus buildings ===
The contributing properties to the historic district, built between 1895 and the 1930s, are:

- The Sheldon Jackson Museum, 57°03′02″N 135°19′21″W, AHRS# SIT-007, built 1895.
- The North Cottage, 57°03′07″N 135°19′31″W, AHRS# SIT-00254, built 1900.
- The Ceramics Building, also known as the Storehouse, 57°03′06″N 135°19′25″W, AHRS# SIT-00553, built 1910-1911.
- The Richard H. Allen Memorial Building, also known as the Allen Memorial Hall and Allen Auditorium, 57°03′06″N 135°19′23″W, AHRS# SIT-00216, built 1910-1911.
- The Whitmore Hall, also known as Home Missions Hall, 57°03′04″N 135°19′22″W, AHRS# SIT-00219, built 1910-1911.
- The Power Plant and Laundry Building, 57°03′04″N 135°19′20″W, AHRS# SIT-00221, built 1910-1911.
- The Fraser Hall, 57°03′03″N 135°19′21″W, AHRS# SIT-00220, built 1910-1911.
- The Stevenson Hall, 57°03′05″N 135°19′29″W, AHRS# SIT-00217, built 1911.
- The North Pacific Hall, 57°03′06″N 135°19′26″W, AHRS# SIT-00218, built 1911.
- The Nancy Craig Cottage, 57°03′00″N 135°19′20″W, AHRS# SIT-00253, built 1914.
- The Ocean Vista Cottage, also known as the Presbyterian Manse, 57°02′58″N 135°19′20″W, AHRS# SIT-00215, built 1914.
- The West Cottage, 57°03′05″N 135°19′32″W, AHRS# SIT-00251, built 1915.
- The Houk House, also known as the Lottie Hapgood Practice Cottage, 57°03′05″N 135°19′31″W, AHRS# SIT-00223, built 1918.
- The Tillie Paul Manor, also known as the Infirmary, 57°03′06″N 135°19′30″W, AHRS# SIT-00222, built 1926.
- The Ada F. Pears Cottage, 57°02′59″N 135°19′22″W, AHRS# SIT-00255, built 1926.
- The Sage Building, 57°02′59″N 135°19′25″W, AHRS# SIT-00224, built 1929.
- The Sawmill, 57°02′58″N 135°19′24″W, AHRS# SIT-00554, built in the 1930s.
- The Quadrangle area, 57°03′04″N 135°19′25″W, AHRS# SIT-00566.

Additional campus buildings are:

- Stratton Library, built 1974.

== Sitka Fine Arts Camp ==
Sitka Fine Arts Camp is a nationally-recognized fine arts summer camp founded and located on the college site. The camp was established in 1973 at the college, although it used other locations in the years that followed before acquiring the majority of historic Sheldon Jackson College buildings and campus in 2011. It took almost four years for a USDA Rural Development loan to be transferred from the college to the camp because of a "maze of paperwork," but it was done in 2013. The camp enrolled approximately 700 in 2013 and offerings have expanded to include a circus program. Adult programs such as a Native Jazz Workshop and the Sitka Arts and Science Institute are also offered and have included artists such as Jason Marsalis.

The camp is a multi-disciplinary arts camp featuring the dramatic arts, music, literary arts, visual arts (ceramics, painting, drawing, sculpture, mask making, photography, video production, Alaska Native arts), and dance. The camp features four separate sessions: "mini camp" (fifth grade and below), middle school camp, high school camp, and a musical theatre camp for high school and college students. Each session culminates in final performances and visual art exhibits. The camp was founded at the college campus, moved to the University of Alaska Southeast/Mt. Edgecumbe High School campus in the 1980s, switched back to Sheldon Jackson College in the 1990s, returned to the Mt. Edgecumbe High School campus in 2006, and in 2011, after the bankruptcy of Sheldon Jackson College and the transfer of its campus to the Fine Arts Camp's parent organization, Alaska Arts Southeast, Inc., the camp returned to the SJ campus. In 2013 the United States Department of Agriculture approved the transfer of two USDA-funded buildings on the campus to Alaska Arts Southeast, and the campus is undergoing continuing renovation activities.

Recognition:

- In 2004, was selected by the National Endowment for the Arts (NEA) as one of ten exceptional summer arts programs in the country.
- In 2004, camp executive director Roger Schmidt was awarded the 2004 Alaska Governor's Award for Arts Education.
- In 2005, was selected by the National Endowment for the Arts as one of 25 exceptional summer arts programs in the country.
- In 2007 received the Coming Up Taller Award from the President's Committee on Arts and Humanities at a ceremony with First Lady, Laura Bush at the White House.
- In 2024, the NEA gave the camp a $45,000 grant.

=== Notable faculty ===
- Alon Yavnai
- Kristin Korb
- Marco d'Ambrosio, noted composer
- Brian Neal, member of Dallas Brass
- Amy Butcher

== Sheldon Jackson Museum ==
The Sheldon Jackson Museum is a Native American museum located on the former campus of Sheldon Jackson College. Many of the artifacts were originally collected by Rev. Sheldon Jackson in his travels through rural Alaska. Sheldon Jackson Museum was founded in 1887, making it the oldest museum in the state of Alaska. When it outgrew its temporary quarters, a new specially dedicated concrete structure was constructed between 1895 and 1897 and, upon completion, became the first concrete structure built in Alaska.

The museum, collection, and grounds are owned and administered by the State of Alaska. Organized within the Alaska Department of Education & Early Development, Division of Libraries, Archives and Museums, the Sheldon Jackson Museum was purchased by the State in the mid-1980s during the administration of Governor Bill Sheffield.

=== Collection ===
Over 5,000 artifacts are housed in the museum. 1,800 are on permanent display in the gallery. Over 3,000 of the objects were originally collected by Rev. Sheldon Jackson in his travels throughout Alaska. The museum's collection exclusively focus on Alaskan Native groups such as the Aleuts, Athabascans, Eskimos, and Tlingit/Tsimshian.

An affiliated advocacy group, Friends of the Sheldon Jackson Museum, sponsors several museum programs including the Alaska Native Artist Residency Program during the summer months and the Share Your Culture/ Share Your Research speaker series during the winter.

== Outer Coast College ==
Since 2018, Outer Coast College has been hosted on the main campus.

== See also ==
- List of National Historic Landmarks in Alaska
- National Register of Historic Places listings in Sitka City and Borough, Alaska
