= Canadian Chamber of Commerce in Shanghai =

Economic promotion organization

The Canadian Chamber of Commerce in Shanghai
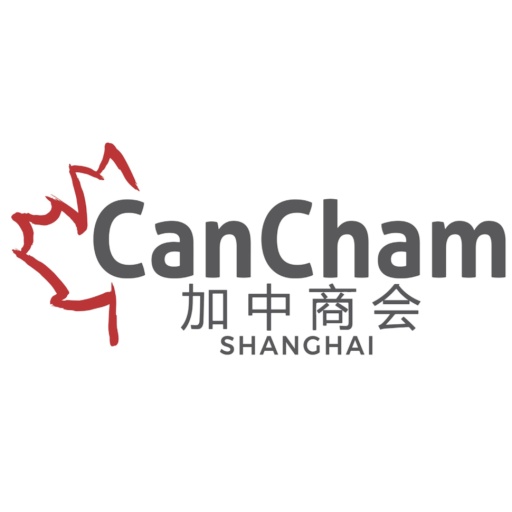
- Formation: 2008
- Location: Shanghai, China
- Chair: Dr. Mark Ceolin
- Website: www.cancham.asia

The Canadian Chamber of Commerce in Shanghai (CanCham Shanghai) is a nonprofit organization and the only Canadian chamber of commerce in Mainland China. The jurisdiction corresponds to that of the Canadian Consulate in Shanghai, stretching from Anhui to Jiangsu, to Zhejiang, all the way to Wuhan and Shanghai proper. Its mission is to support Canadian businesses in China by helping them develop their networks and marketing opportunities as well as to cultivate a thriving Canadian community in Shanghai and the region. The Canadian Chamber of Commerce in Shanghai is located at the Shanghai Center in the Jing`An district of Shanghai. The Canadian Chamber of Commerce is led by the Chair, and 11 members of the board of directors. The executive director and the staff of the Chamber are responsible for the daily operations of the Chamber.

== History ==
Predating the Chamber, there was a Canadian Business Forum formed in 1996 by a group of locally based Canadian companies and entrepreneurs, called the Canadian Business Forum (CBF). In 2001, the CBF formed a partnership with the Canada-China Business Council (CCBC) and was renamed the CCBC Shanghai Chapter. In June 2008, due to local Chinese regulatory issues, led by the Chair, Dr. Mark Ceolin, the membership of the CCBC Shanghai Chapter separated from the CCBC, and the Canadian Chamber of Commerce was properly and formally established. On June 18, 2008, the Canadian Chamber of Commerce was officially inaugurated in name, recognised by both the Canadian and Chinese government regulatory bodies.

== Mission ==
From the Canadian Chamber of Commerce in Shanghai website: "The Canadian Chamber of Commerce in Shanghai is the pre-eminent organization supporting Canadian business and community interests. CanCham Shanghai informs and promotes Canadian interests in Eastern China and fosters connections within the Canadian business community with their Chinese counterparts."

- Promote the development of trade, commerce and investment between Canada and China
- Provide a forum in which the Canadian business community in China can identify and discuss common commercial issues in China
- Represent, express and give effect to the views of the Canadian business community in China regarding trade, investment, finance, industry and related matters
- Work with Chinese organizations, governmental departments and the Chinese business community on matters of mutual interests
- Maintain relations with other independent business associations and organizations.

== Membership ==
Membership of CanCham Shanghai consists of Canada-China joint ventures and wholly owned Canadian companies, ranging from some of the largest and best-recognized corporations to medium and small-sized enterprises. Current corporate members include Air Canada, Canpotex, CN, CP, Manulife-Sinochem, Soprema, and Teck.

== Board of directors ==
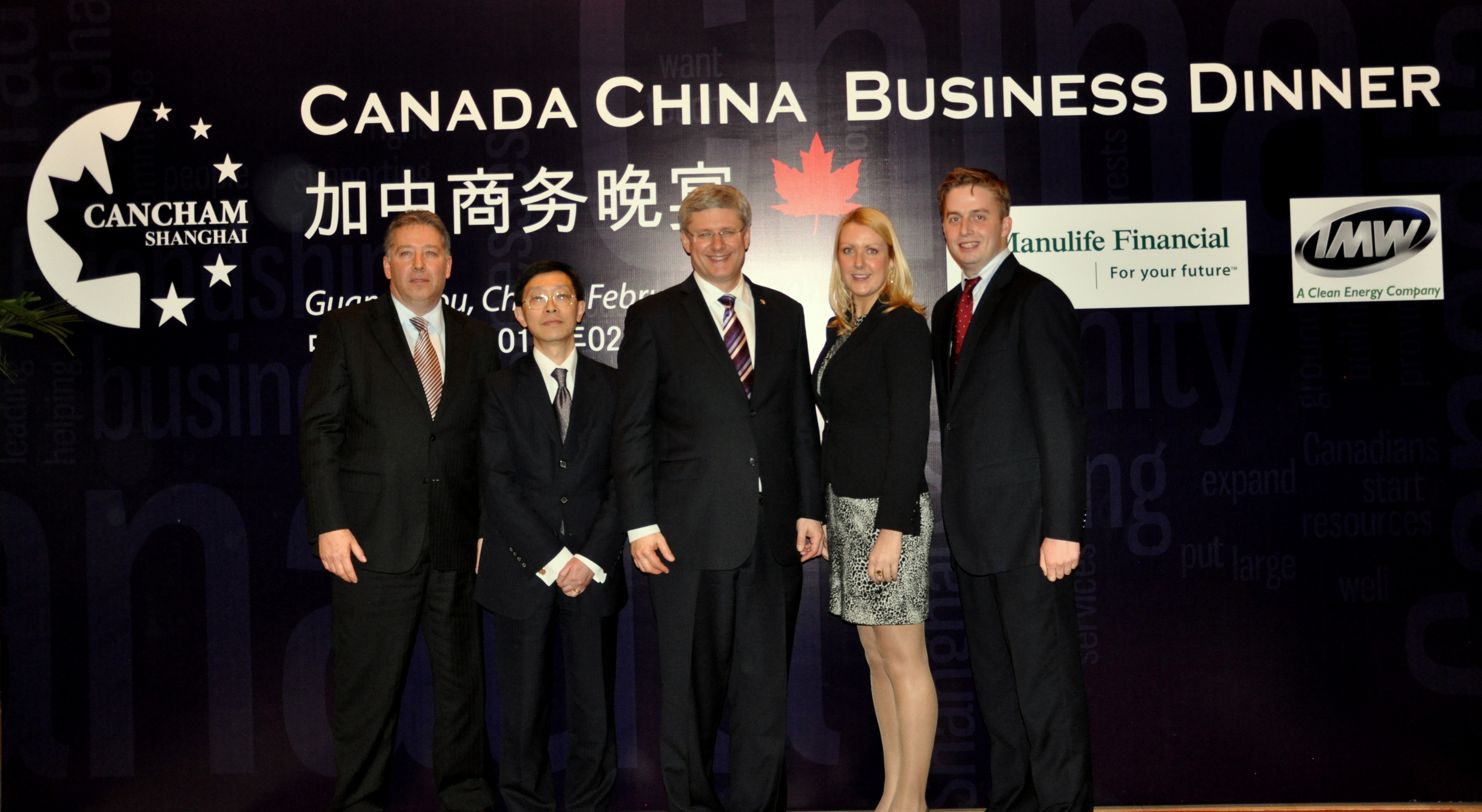
Canadian Prime Minister Stephen Harper with members of the Board of Directors of the Canadian Chamber of Commerce in Shanghai at the Canada China Business Dinner in Guangzhou, February 2012

The Canadian Chamber of Commerce is led by twelve member board of directors, which consists of eleven elected directors and one ex officio director. The ex officio director must be the Senior Trade Commissioner of the Canadian Consulate General in Shanghai. The directors are either Canadian MNCs' representatives or Canadian entrepreneurs running their own business in East China. Board members are responsible for forming and driving the policies as well as providing guidance on all the activities of the Chamber.

The Consul General is also the honorary president of the Canadian Chamber of Commerce in Shanghai.

=== Board members 2009 ===
- Honorary President: Nadir Patel, Canadian Consul General of Shanghai
- Chair: Dr. Mark Ceolin
- Vice Chair: John Chan
- Vice Chair ex officio: Jordan Reeves (Deputy Consul General)
- Treasurer: Brian Castle
- Directors: Anthony Fong, Charles Wang, Fred Spoke, Keith Lomason, Line Robillard, Michael Murphy, Robert Martin, Sharon Wong

=== Board members 2011-2012 ===
- Honorary President: Rick Savone, Canadian Consul General of Shanghai
- Chair: Sharon Wong
- Vice Chair: Winston Kan
- Vice Chair ex officio: Eric Pelletier
- Treasurer: Nancy Kingsley Hu
- Directors: Anthony Fong, Mark Ceolin, Thomas Cheong, Eunice Wang, John McDonald, Radley MacKenzie, Alan McMillan, Olivier Brault.

=== Board members 2013-2014 ===
- Honorary President: Rick Savone, Canadian Consul General of Shanghai
- Chair: Richard S. Grams
- Vice Chair: Colin Bogar
- Vice Chair Ex-Officio: Eric Pelletier
- Treasurer: Douglas Sibley
- Directors: Colin Bogar, Olivier Brault, Richard S. Grams, Ann Louise Herten, Lonny Kubas, Radley Mackenzie, John E. McDonald, Guy R. A. Mills, David Stavros, Olivia Zhou

=== Board members 2015–2017 ===
- Honorary President: Weldon Epp, Canadian Consul General of Shanghai
- Chair Colin Bogar
- Vice Chair: Olivier Brault
- Vice Chair ex officio: Ryan Baerg
- Treasurer: Doug Sibley
- Directors: Jim Athansopolous, Russel Aydin, Donghai Du, Jackie Greenizan, Sean Goff, Alan Lu, Olivia Zhou, Richard Ling

=== Board members 2017–2019 ===
- Honorary President: Weldon Epp, Canadian Consul General of Shanghai
- Chair: Jim Athansopolous
- Vice Chair: Jackie Greenizan
- Vice Chair ex officio: Ryan Baerg
- Treasurer: Wendy Wang
- Directors: Russel Aydin, Donghai Du, Tony Jaw, Jean-Francois Lepine, Frank O'Brien, Eunice Wang, Maggie Wang, Kai Zhang

=== Board members 2019–Present ===
- Honorary President: Dave Murphy, Canadian Consul General of Shanghai
- Chair: Kai Zhang
- Vice Chair: Mikael Charette
- Vice Chair ex officio: Jean-Christian Brillant
- Treasurer: Vivienne Gu
- Directors: Olivier Brault, Mark Ceolin, Victor Cui, Donghai Du, Veronique Gong, Tony Jaw, Gabriel Lagunes, Jean-Francois Lepine

== Events ==
CanCham's primary goal is to facilitate relations between the Canadian and Chinese community in Shanghai, and accordingly they host many events throughout the year, as well as support various inter-chamber functions in Shanghai. These events are both business-related and social in nature, and include workshops, seminars, conferences, mixers and networking events, and 'Canuck Connection' social events. Some notable annual community events include:

- Spring Alumni Mixer
- Canada Day
- La Fête Nationale du Québec
- Hockey Night in Shanghai
- Maple Leaf Ball
- Canadian Alumni Thanksgiving
- Christmas

== Highlights ==
- In June 2008 CanCham Shanghai is officially recognized as "The Canadian Chamber of Commerce in Shanghai", at the Annual General Meeting.
- In September 2008 CanCham Shanghai hosts "Theory & Practice the First Annual Symposium on Sustainable Business Practices"
- In November 2008 the Canadian Chamber of Commerce in Shanghai organizes Hello-Allo Canada, a three-day street festival celebrating Canadian culture on Yandang Road in Shanghai.
- On December 4, 2009, the Canadian Chamber of Commerce in Shanghai and the Canada-China Business Council co-host a dinner welcoming Prime Minister Stephen Harper to Shanghai,
- In May 2010 CanCham Shanghai organizes a business luncheon for the Mayor of Montreal.
- In June 2010 CanCham hosts a business luncheon for the Québec Minister of Finance Raymond Bachand.
- On June 4, 2011, CanCham Shanghai hosts the 1st Asia-Pacific CanCham Forum with keynote speakers Chinese economist Dr. Fan Gang, Eric Siegel, President and CEO of Export Development Canada (EDC), as well as the Honourable Peter Van Loan, Minister of International Trade.
- On July 1, 2010, CanCham Shanghai, along with the Montreal and Vancouver Pavilion celebrates Canada Day at the Canada Pavilion at Expo 2010 Shanghai in the presence of the Right Honourable Michaëlle Jean, Governor General of Canada.
- On August 16, 2010, CanCham Shanghai and CN organizes reception to celebrate the signing of an MOU between the Shanghai No. 9 People's Hospital and the Smile China Project.
- On September 20, 2010, CanCham Shanghai facilitates business roundtable with Vancouver mayor Gregor Robertson, Vancouver delegates and local business leaders
- On July 20, 2011, CanCham Shanghai and CCBC hosts a business luncheon for John Baird, the Minister of Foreign Affairs for Canada.
- On September 1, 2011, the Québec Government Office in Shanghai and CanCham Shanghai hosts a luncheon for Jean Charest, the Premier of Quebec.
- On November 7, 2011, the British Columbia Trade Office and CanCham Shanghai hosts the BC Alumni Ambassadors Reception with Premier of British Columbia, Christy Clark
- On November 9, 2011, CanCham Shanghai and CN hosts the Canada-China Business Leaders' Dinner with Canada's Minister of Natural Resources, Joe Oliver.
- On February 10, 2012, The Canadian Consulate with CanCham Shanghai, CanCham Hong Kong and the Canada China Business Council hosts the Canada China Business Dinner with Keynote Speaker Prime Minister Stephen Harper
- On September 17, 2012, CanCham, JP Star and CN host the Council of the Federation with Keynote Speakers, Premier Bob McCleod - The North West Territories and Premier Greg Selinger - Manitoba
- On October 22, 2012, CanCham Shanghai hosts Mayor of Victoria Dean Fortin Luncheon
- On January 14, 2013, CanCham Shanghai hosts reception in honour of the Ontario Trade Mission to China for the Honourable Dalton McGuinty, Premier of Ontario and his accompanying Trade Mission Delegates
- On October 20, 2013, Governor General David Johnston awards medals to 4 CanCham Members at Reception for the Friends of Canada:

-Karen Cvornyek President and Regional Managing Principal, Asia
-Mark Ceolin, former Chair of CanCham Shanghai, CEO of Red Gate International
-Marie-Lucie Spoke, Founder & Managing Director, Community Roots China
-Ryan Pyle, adventurer, Mandarin House

- On February 20, 2014, CanCham Shanghai organized a luncheon between Canadian Consul General Rick Savone and its young professional members. This was a unique opportunity for the next generation of Canadian leaders to better understand Sino-Canada relations and discuss upcoming opportunities and challenges.
- On March 21, 2014, Canada's Citizenship and Immigration Minister, the Honourable Chris Alexander, speaks to CanCham Shanghai Members at the Canada-China Business Dinner in Shanghai.
- on March 25, 2014, CanCham Shanghai held its Annual General Meeting at the Shanghai Peace Hotel. Canadian Consul General in Shanghai Rick Savone gave the opening remarks and CanCham Shanghai's Chair Richard Grams gave a retrospective of 2013.
- On May 19, 2014, CanCham Shanghai held a dinner marking the occasion of the visit of the Honourable Ed Fast, Canada's Minister of International Trade. Special thanks to the dinner's sponsor: CN.
- On May 31, 2014, CanCham Shanghai presented Hockey Night in Shanghai III: Canada vs The World. More than 2,000 fans filled the Feiyang Skating Center to watch an exciting ice hockey game.
- on June 21, 2014, The Canadian Chamber of Commerce in Shanghai, in partnership with the Quebec Office in Shanghai, CN and Hungry Lung's Kitchen, held the Fête nationale du Québec celebrations in Shanghai.
- on June 28, 2014, CanCham in Shanghai held a beach party to celebrate Canada Day at the Bund Beach.
- on August 4, 2014, The CanCham Shanghai team welcomed Vivian Xie as their new executive director.
- On September 4, 2014, CanCham hosted the Nova Scotia Premier, Stephen McNeil.
- On October 20, 2014, CanCham hosted a dinner with the premier of Manitoba, Greg Selinger.
- On October 27, 2014, CanCham hosted the premier of Québec, Philippe Couillard.
- On October 28, 2014, the chamber hosted a luncheon with the premier of Ontario, Kathleen Wynne.
- On January 16, 2015, the Canadian Chamber of Commerce in Shanghai hosted a delegation from the Northwest Territories who were on a trade mission to China.
- On March 8, 2015, Rebecca Copelovici became the new executive director of the Chamber.
- On March 30, 2015, CanCham Shanghai held its Annual General Meeting at the Fairmont Peace Hotel in Shanghai. Acting Canadian Consul General in Shanghai and Senior Trade Commissioner, as well as Vice Chair Ex-officio of CanCham Eric Pelletier gave the opening remarks and presided over the official board election. Vice Chair Colin Bogar gave a review of 2014's Activities, followed by the 2014 Financial Report presented by Treasurer Doug Sibley.
- On April 28, 2015, the Canadian Chamber of Commerce celebrated the opening of its new office in the Jing'An Kerry Centre in Shanghai. The new logo of CanCham was also unveiled at the event, as well as other rebranding done to mark the beginning of a new era in CanCham's operations. The Chamber announced their CSR Partnership with Community Roots China, and launched their CanCham group membership insurance plan with Manulife-Sinochem.
- On June 27, 2015, CanCham hosted the Canada Day Beach Party on the Bund in Shanghai.
- On September 19, 2015, the Chamber held its annual Maple Leaf Ball at the Grand Hyatt Hotel in Pudong, Shanghai. The theme was "Northern Lights".
- From October 15 to October 28, 2015, CanCham led a delegation of investors and professionals in Nova Scotia, Canada.
- On January 13, 2016, CanCham hosted a seminar on China's 13th Five-Year-Plan.
- On March 22, 2016, the Chamber hosted its Annual General Meeting, as well as the Consul General of Canada in Shanghai, Weldon Epp, who presented his Consulate Briefing for 2016.
