= Outer Coast College =

Private college in Sitka, Alaska

Outer Coast
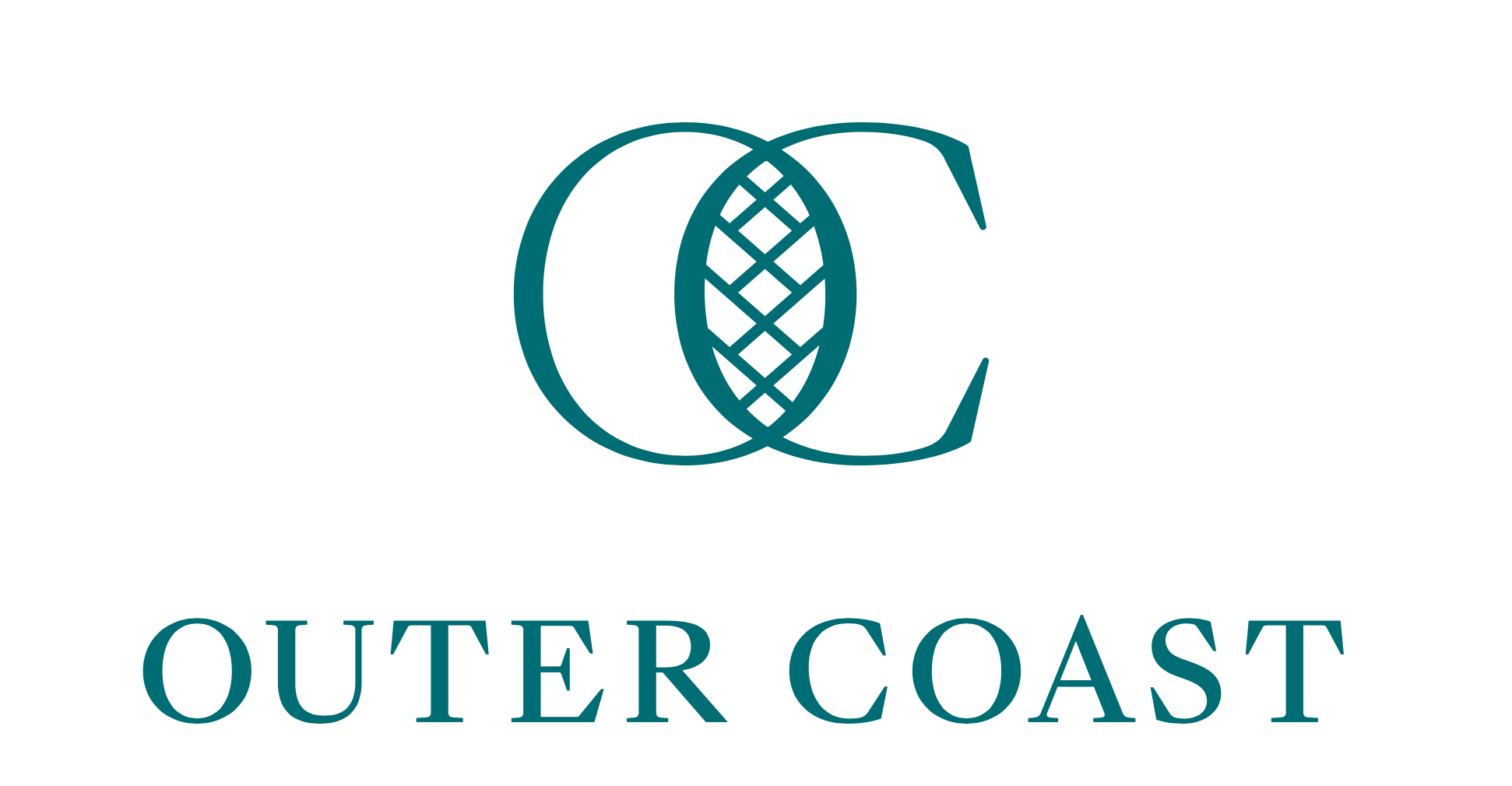
- Type: Unaccredited private college
- Established: 2015
- Location: Sitka, Alaska, United States; 57.05135°N 135.32159°W
- Campus: Rural
- Website: outercoast.org

Outer Coast is an unaccredited private college in Sitka, Alaska, United States. It opened a two-year undergraduate program in fall 2024. Outer Coast admitted a freshman class of 20 students in 2024 and a similar number in 2025, for a total student body of about 40. The first undergraduate class graduated in 2026.

== History ==
After Sheldon Jackson College closed in 2007, the title to the campus was transferred to the Sitka Fine Arts Camp in February 2011. In 2014, Alaska state representative Jonathan Kreiss-Tomkins began deliberating with alumni, teachers, and students of Deep Springs College about founding a new college on the historic campus in partnership with the Fine Arts Camp. Full-time work to create Outer Coast began in September 2015.

The inaugural Outer Coast Summer Seminar launched in 2018, drawing in rising high school juniors and seniors from across Alaska and the continental United States to participate in rigorous college-level courses and service projects.

Outer Coast ran three iterations of the Outer Coast Year, a nine-month, credit-bearing intensive for high school graduates. The Outer Coast Year transitioned to the full two-year undergraduate program in 2024 in partnership with the University of Alaska Southeast. The institution continues to offer yearly Summer Seminars for high school students.

Admissions at Outer Coast are need-blind and run on a sliding-scale, means-based cost of attendance model.

== Academics ==
Outer Coast is modeled on Deep Springs's "three pillars" of academics, labor, and self-governance. In academics, students enroll in a rotating series of seminars across disciplines as well as core Indigenous Studies courses, which prominently feature Tlingit language learning. In self-governance, students are actively involved in the college's governance and operations through Student Body ("SB") meetings and smaller committees vested with particular responsibilities and decision-making authority. At Outer Coast, the labor pillar is reinterpreted as a service pillar. Students develop service projects with community organizations in Sitka. Outer Coast's curriculum emphasizes bridging Western and Indigenous ways of knowing, and educating students about the Sheldon Jackson campus's role as an American Indian boarding school.

Outer Coast is not accredited but its website says the college is "authorized as a postsecondary institution by the Alaska Commission on Postsecondary Education (ACPE) and confers credit through our collaboration with University of Alaska Southeast". It also says it is pursuing accreditation.
