= Chris Pile =

Chris Pile may refer to:

- Chris Pile (footballer) (born 1967), former footballer
- Chris Pile (programmer) (born 1969), British computer programmer
