= Sitka Sound Science Center =

Marine research center in Sitka, Alaska, United States

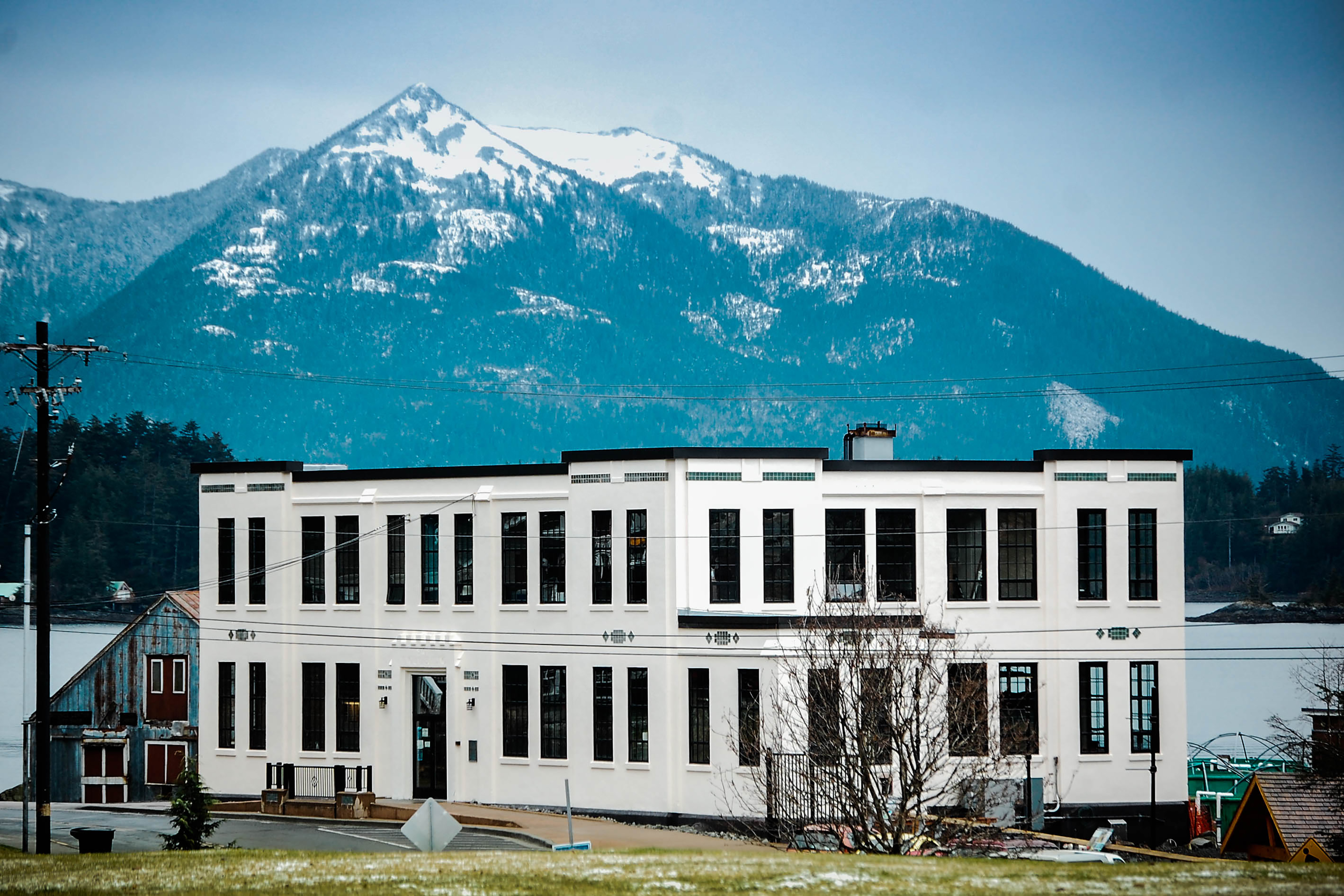
- Sage Memorial Building, 834 Lincoln St, Sitka, AK 99835
- Interactive map of Sitka Sound Science Center
- 57°02′59″N 135°19′25″W
- Location: Sitka, Alaska
- Major exhibits: Molly Ahlgren Aquarium
- Website: sitkascience.org

The Sitka Sound Science Center is a non-profit dedicated to research and education in Alaska in Sitka, Alaska. It is based in the Sage Building, which is located on Lincoln Street across from the old Sheldon Jackson Campus. It is a biological field station and includes the Sheldon Jackson salmon hatchery, the Molly Ahlgren Aquarium, a research lab, classrooms and offices. Sheldon Jackson Salmon Hatchery was the first permitted hatchery in the State of Alaska and built by the students of the college in 1972. SSSC maintains and operates the working hatchery as an aquaculture and educational tool. It is permitted for 3 million pink, 3 million chum and 250,000 coho salmon.

The Sitka Sound Science Center (SSSC) was established in 2007 in the old laboratories of Sheldon Jackson College after the college closed in 2007. SSSC employs 15–20 people year round and an additional 12 in the summer months. As a field station, SSSC is a platform for research offering services and facilities to visiting researchers and supporting research that is important locally such as landslides, ocean acidification, salmon, intertidal, and marine geology. It is part of both the Organization for Biological Field Stations and the National Association for Marine Laboratories.

The Science Center has a special emphasis on community engagement in science and does significant science communication training for scientists working in Alaska. It has a Scientist in Residence Fellowship (SIRF) program that has been supported by the National Science Foundation and brings scientist to Sitka for a one month mini sabbatical and to learn how to communicate research and work with local, rural Alaska communities. In 2014, the Sage building was renovated and in 2020, the Sitka Sawmill building was restored. Both buildings are contributing structures to the Sheldon Jackson Training School National Historic Landmark. The Mill building houses a gift shop and chowder cart in the summer and also is used by the hatchery, education and research departments for storage, machine shop and classes. The hatchery was vandalized in 2019. The Science Center's educational programs are aimed at a breadth of ages from preschool to lifelong learners. It has in school and out of school programs, summer camps, internships and opportunities in mentored research.

== Molly Ahlgren Aquarium ==
The Molly Ahlgren Aquarium is named after a respected local marine ecologist and Sheldon Jackson College professor who died in 2004. It opened while the Sage Building was still under Sheldon Jackson College management in 2005 through funding provided by grants written by Ahlgren before her death.

The aquarium includes touch tanks and several exhibits, includes many species that make Sitka Sound their home. In 2019 it had 14,500 visitors.

== Gallery ==
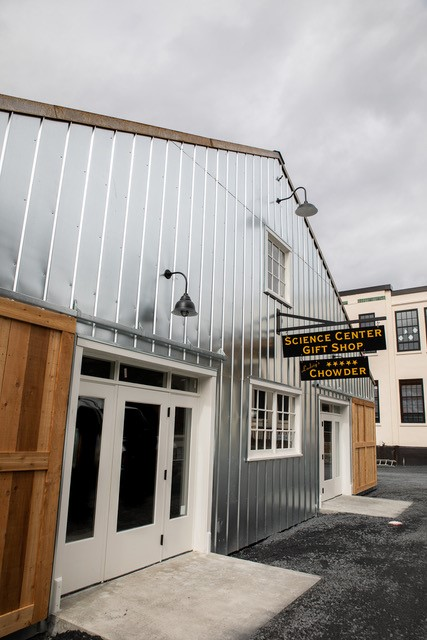

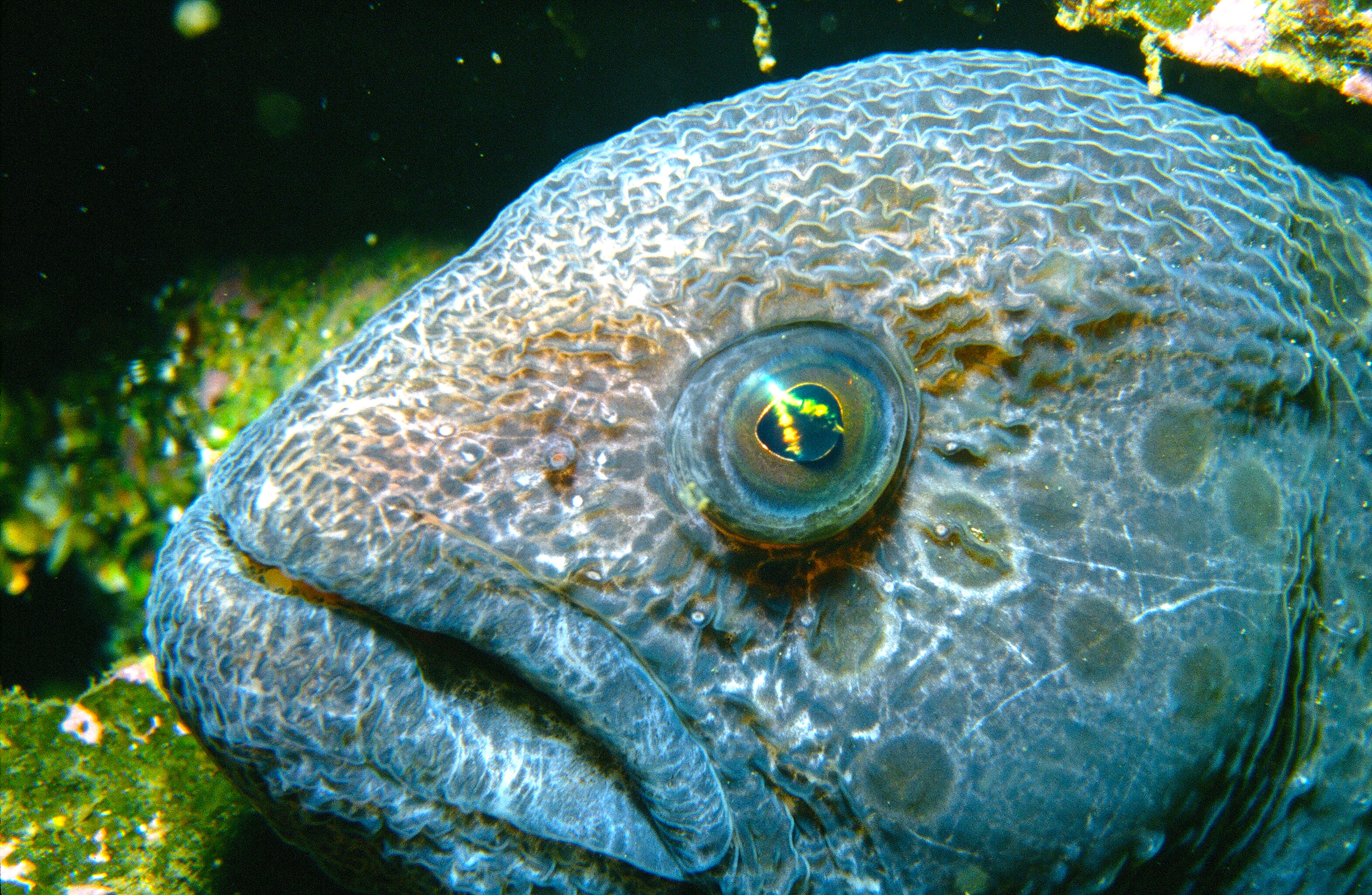
Wolf eel (Anarrhichthys ocellatus)

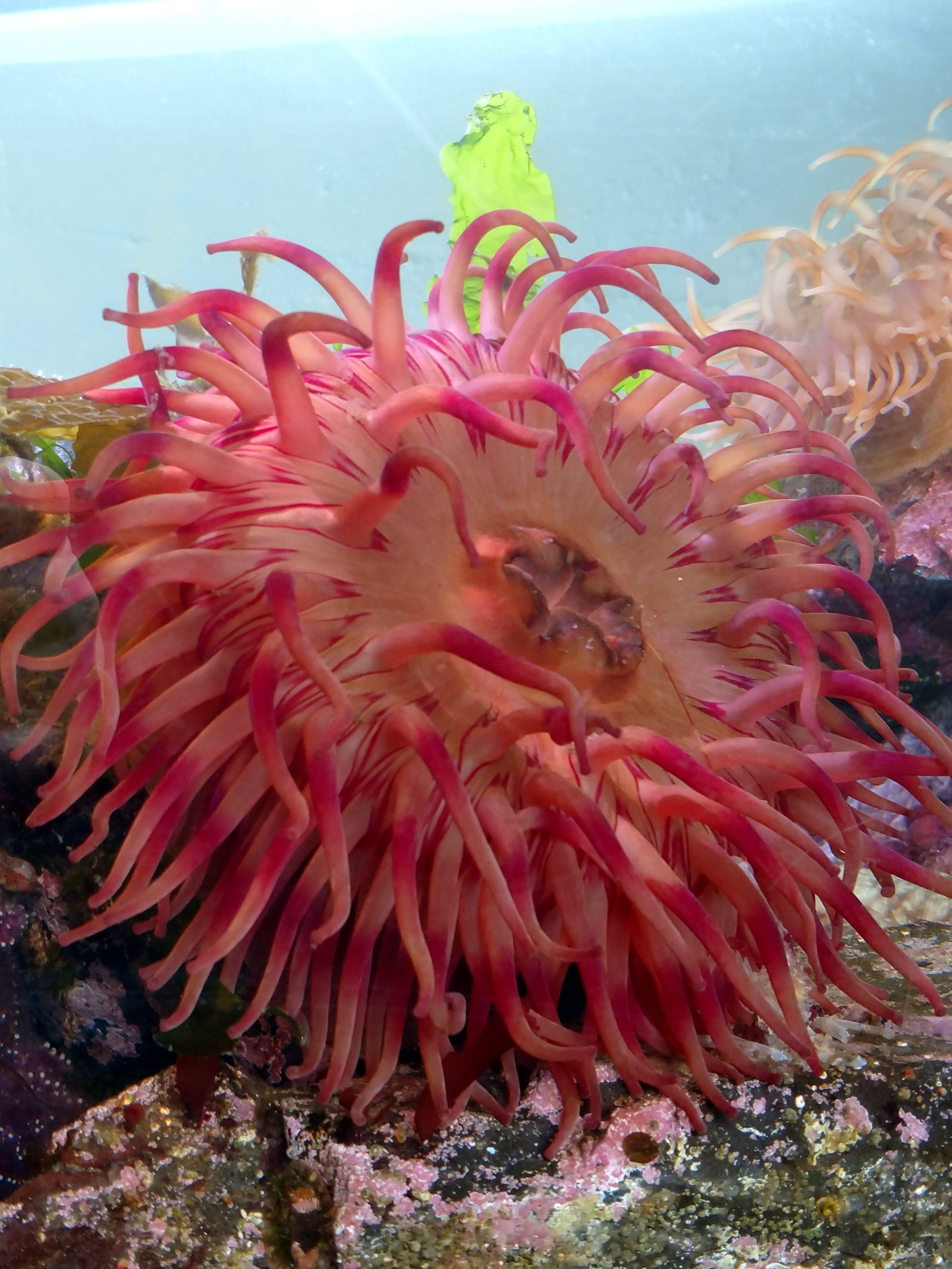
Painted Anemone

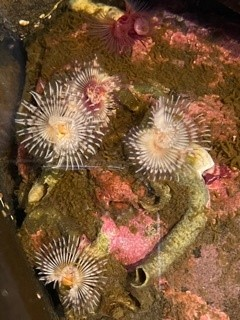
Tube Worm

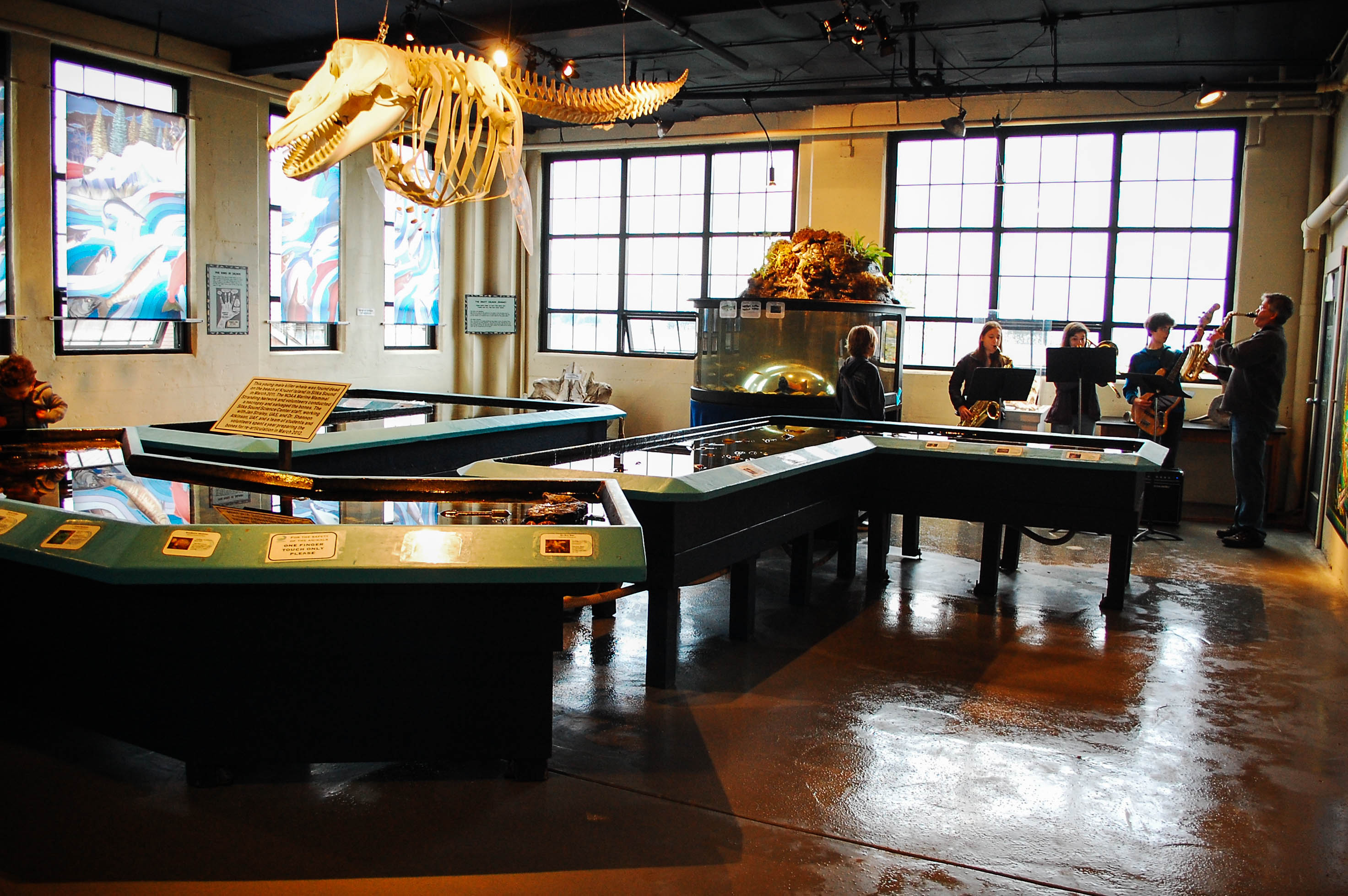
Touch tanks.

== See also ==
- List of science centers
