= Nicole Walker (writer) =

American essayist, poet, and professor

Nicole Walker is an American essayist, poet, and professor.

== Life and work ==
Nicole Walker grew up in Salt Lake City, Utah. She graduated from Reed College with her Bachelor of Arts, and the University of Utah with her Master in Fine Arts in Creative Writing (2000) and Ph.D. in English Literature and Creative Writing (2006). She is Vice President of the NonfictioNOW Conference, board member for Northern Arizona Book Festival, and nonfiction editor of the online literary journal, DIAGRAM.

She has taught at the University of Utah, Grand Valley State University, and is currently a professor and MFA Program Director at Northern Arizona University in Flagstaff, Arizona.

She is also the co-editor of the popular nonfiction anthology, Bending Genre. A book about pushing the genre line, Bending Genre includes acclaimed writers Michael Martone, Brenda Miller, Ander Monson, and David Shields.

Her book, Egg, is part of Bloomsbury's Object Lessons series.

In addition to her book projects, Walker has written nearly one hundred letters to Arizona Governor Doug Ducey. Called a "one-way pen pal relationship" by the Arizona Capitol Times, most of the letters are focused on public, higher education in the State of Arizona. Her Letters to Ducey now appear regularly at the Arizona Daily Sun.

Along with artist Rebecca Campbell, Nicole Walker curated the ekphrastic game of telephone, 7 Artists, 7 Rings. It originally appeared on Huffington Post.

On August 18, 2022, Walker's autobiographical piece about the sexual assaults upon her by a 14-year-old boy and her subsequent abortion at age 11 was published by the New York Times. She felt compelled to tell that difficult story in the wake of the Supreme Court of the United States' reversing of Roe v. Wade (1973), and Planned Parenthood v. Casey (1992) in its June 24, 2022, Dobbs v. Jackson Women's Health Organization decision.

== Bibliography ==
=== Nonfiction ===
How to Plant a Billion Trees: A Memoir of Child Trauma and the Healing Power of Nature. Bloomsbury 2026

Writing the Hard Stuff: Turning Difficult Subjects into Meaningful Prose. Bloomsbury 2025

Processed Meats: Essays on Food, Flesh, and Navigating Disaster. Torrey House Press. 2021

The After-Normal: Brief, Alphabetical Essays on a Changing Planet. Rose Metal Press. 2019

Sustainability: A Love Story. Ohio State University Press. 2018.

Where the Tiny Things Are: Feathered Essays. Punctum Press. 2017.

Egg. Bloomsbury Editions. 2017.

Quench Your Thirst with Salt. Zone 3 Press. 2013.

=== Poetry ===
This Noisy Egg. Barrow Street Press. 2010.

=== Editor ===
Bending Genre. Toward a Theory of Nonfiction. Bloomsbury Press. 2013.

=== Chapbooks ===
Microwine. Essay Press. 2016.

Micrograms. New Michigan Press. 2016.

Distracted Parents of the Micromanagement Era. Black Warrior Review. 2015.

== Awards ==
National Endowment for the Arts Fellowship

Arizona Commission on the Arts Individual Artist Grant

Zone 3 Press Creative Nonfiction Award

Independent Press Silver Medal.

Best American Essays, Notable Essays 2008, 2014, 2015, 2016

Best of the Net, 2013 and 2014
