= Pyles =

Pyles is a surname. Notable people with the surname include:

== People ==
- Malia Pyles (born 2000), American actress
- Marjorie Pyles Honzik (1908–2003), American developmental psychologist
- Rodney Pyles (1945–2026), American politician; Democratic member of the West Virginia House of Delegates
- Stephan Pyles (born 1952), American author of five cookbooks on Texan and Southwestern Cuisine
- Terry Pyles, American artist from Alaska
- Vern Pyles (1919–2013), American politician; Republican member of the Pennsylvania House of Representatives
- Jackie Pyles, member of the American girl group School Gyrls

== See also ==
- Pyle (surname), a similar surname
