= Andrew Pyle (economist) =

Canadian economist (born 1963)

- Born: c. 1963
- Occupations: economist, investment advisor

Andrew Pyle (born c. 1963) is a Canadian economist, currently an advisor and portfolio manager with CIBC Wood Gundy in Peterborough, Ontario. Andrew also writes a weekly newsletter which can be found at pyle-group.com and also provides a monthly conference call. He also appears on BNN Bloomberg as well as other media outlets. He was previously Scotia Economics vice-president and Head of Capital Market Research. Prior to that he was ABN AMRO's Chief Canadian Strategist. He is regularly featured in economic stories of such Canadian national media outlets as the National Post and the Globe and Mail.

Pyle graduated from the University of Toronto.
