= Ryan Pyle =

Canadian photographer

- Born: 20 September 1978 (age 48); Oakville, Ontario, Canada
- Education: University of Toronto
- Presenting career
- Show: Extreme Treks
- Show: Tough Rides
- Previous show: Expedition Asia
- Website: www.ryanpyle.com

Ryan Pyle is an adventure photographer and television producer and host. He has created, filmed and hosted four seasons of Extreme Treks, three seasons of the Tough Rides, as well as other international adventure programs. His still photography has appeared in The New York Times, The Wall Street Journal, Time, Newsweek, Forbes, and other international publications, as well as several books including Chinese Turkestan and Sacred Mountains of China.

Pyle set the Guinness World Record for the longest motorcycle ride, has been awarded five Asian Television Awards, and a Gold Medallion from the Governor General of Canada, among other recognitions.

== Early life ==
Pyle was born and raised in Oakville, Ontario, Canada. He played basketball beginning at the age of six, continuing the sport through attendance at the University of Toronto. While in college, he studied modern Chinese history and politics, while playing CIS basketball. When it was clear he would not turn pro, he decided to change professions.

Pyle moved to Shanghai, and in 2004 started a career in photography. His work appeared in The New York Times, Time magazine, The Wall Street Journal. In 2009, Photo District News named Pyle one of the top 30 emerging photographers in the world.

== Television career ==
Pyle began working in television the following year with the creation of his first show, Tough Ride: China, which was broadcast on Travel Channel. The program followed Pyle and his brother, Colin, on a motorcycle trip around the Middle Kingdom, China, an expedition that covered 16,240 kilometers, and earned the brothers a place in the Guinness World Records for longest continuous journey by motorcycle within a single country.

Pyle wrote a book documenting the 65-day trip called, The Middle Kingdom Ride: Two Brothers, Two Motorcycles, One Epic Journey Around China. In 2011, the Pyle brothers transversed India for the program called Tough Rides: India, then Brazil for Tough Rides: Brazil, which aired in 2016.

In the years between Tough Rides episodes, Pyle created and released another series called ‘’Extreme Treks’’ in 2014, 2017, and then again in 2018. The shows were filmed in Oman, Argentina, Papua New Guinea, Tibet, Russia, Iceland, Laos, Bolivia, Jordan and Uganda.

The fourth season of ‘’Extreme Treks’’ was in production in Myanmar in February 2020 and Ethiopia that March, but was shut down due to the global COVID-19 pandemic. Pyle isolated in Istanbul, Turkey piecing together the footage for the season of the show that airs on Amazon Prime.

In June 2020, Pyle's 10-part series ‘’Expedition Asia’’, featuring his visits to the Philippines, China, Indonesia, Mongolia, Taiwan, Hong Kong, Kyrgyzstan, Thailand, Malaysia and India, began airing on the Discovery Channel.

By October 2020, Pyle was in production with two new series: Meet the Makers, a global travel show introducing people who make objects by hand, and The Nomad, based on his South China Morning Post column of the same name.

== Awards and recognition ==
- 2020 – Best Director Non-Fiction – Winner
- 2020 – Best Lifestyle Presenter – Winner
- 2020 – Best Non-Scripted Entertainment: Extreme Treks Season 3 – Winner
- 2014 – Explorer of the Year – Geographical Society of Philadelphia
- 2013 – Gold Medallion – Governor General of Canada
- 2012 – Guinness World Record – Adventure Motorcycle Riding
- 2010 – Photo District News Photo Annual – Winner
- 2009 – Photo District News 30 – Emerging Photographer Award

== Television series ==
- 2021 – Tough Rides: Saudi Arabia – In Pre-Production
- 2021 – Meet The Makers Season 1 – In Production
- 2020 – The Nomad Season 1 – In Production
- 2021 – Extreme Treks Season 4 – In Production
- 2020 – Expedition Asia Season 1 – Discovery Channel || Amazon Prime
- 2018 – Extreme Treks Season 3 – BBC Earth || Amazon Prime
- 2017 – Extreme Treks Season 2 – BBC Earth || Amazon Prime
- 2016 – Tough Rides: Brazil – Travel Channel || Amazon Prime
- 2014 – Extreme Treks Season 1 – Discovery Channel || Amazon Prime
- 2014 – China's Great Gateway – Discovery Channel
- 2014 – Tough Rides: India – Travel Channel || Amazon Prime
- 2013 – Tough Rides: China – Travel Channel || Amazon Prime

== Published work ==
- 2017 – Sacred Mountains – Photography
- 2016 – Tough Rides: Brazil – Author, photography
- 2015 – Sacred Mountains of China – Author
- 2014 – Chinese Turkestan – Photography
- 2014 – The India Ride – Author
- 2013 – The Middle Kingdom Ride – Author
