= John M. Pyle =

Ultramarathoner and convicted sex offender (born 1956)

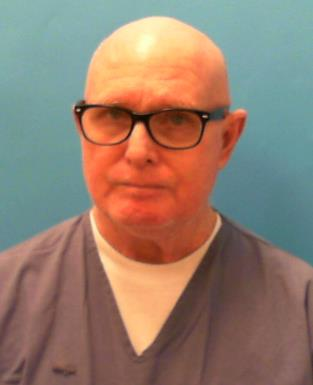
- 2024 mug shot
- Born: Nov 23, 1956 (age 69)
- Occupation: Businessperson
- Known for: Transcontinental run; Criminal charges
- Criminal charges: Possession of child pornography × 30; Failure to appear
- Criminal penalty: 15 years imprisonment
- Criminal status: Imprisoned at Calhoun CI
- Spouse: Toninne (div. 2015)

John Michael Pyle (born November 23, 1956) is an American prisoner (and former fugitive) for possession of child pornography, former businessman, and noted ultramarathoner.

== Personal life ==
Born on November 23, 1956, John Michael Pyle dropped out from Manatee High School to pursue a career in carpentry. By his 20s, Pyle was an alcoholic; he entered alcohol rehabilitation on February 28, 1987.

Circa 1975, he married a woman named Toninne, and they opened businesses in the construction and clothing industries, but became bankrupt in the business cycle of the 2000s. In 2015, and driven by his multiple adulterous relationships, the Pyles divorced.

== Running ==
Under the tutelage of Ray Zahab, in 2012 Pyle spent 80 straight days running 3,273 miles (5,267 km) from San Francisco to Key West. He was raising funds and awareness for the Wounded Warrior Project, carrying a 3-by-5-foot (0.91 by 1.52 m) flag of the United States the whole way. Pyle was interviewed by local news outlets along his run, and was recognized at a Houston Astros game when he ran through that Texas city.

== Criminal activity ==
In the late 20th century, Pyle was arrested for driving under the influence, possession of marijuana, and check kiting.

=== Child pornography ===
At approximately 6:45 a.m. on June 24, 2016, the Sarasota Police Department searched Pyle's condominium in Sarasota, Florida based on three tips received from the National Center for Missing & Exploited Children. They found 48 images of child pornography, including 15 depicting child sexual abuse and two with bondage; girls as young as seven and one year old were pictured. Due to the quantity of images, ages of the victims, and severity of the acts, Pyle was charged with 30 second-degree felonies for possessing child pornography (as opposed to third-degree charges), which could bring a sentence of 450 years imprisonment.

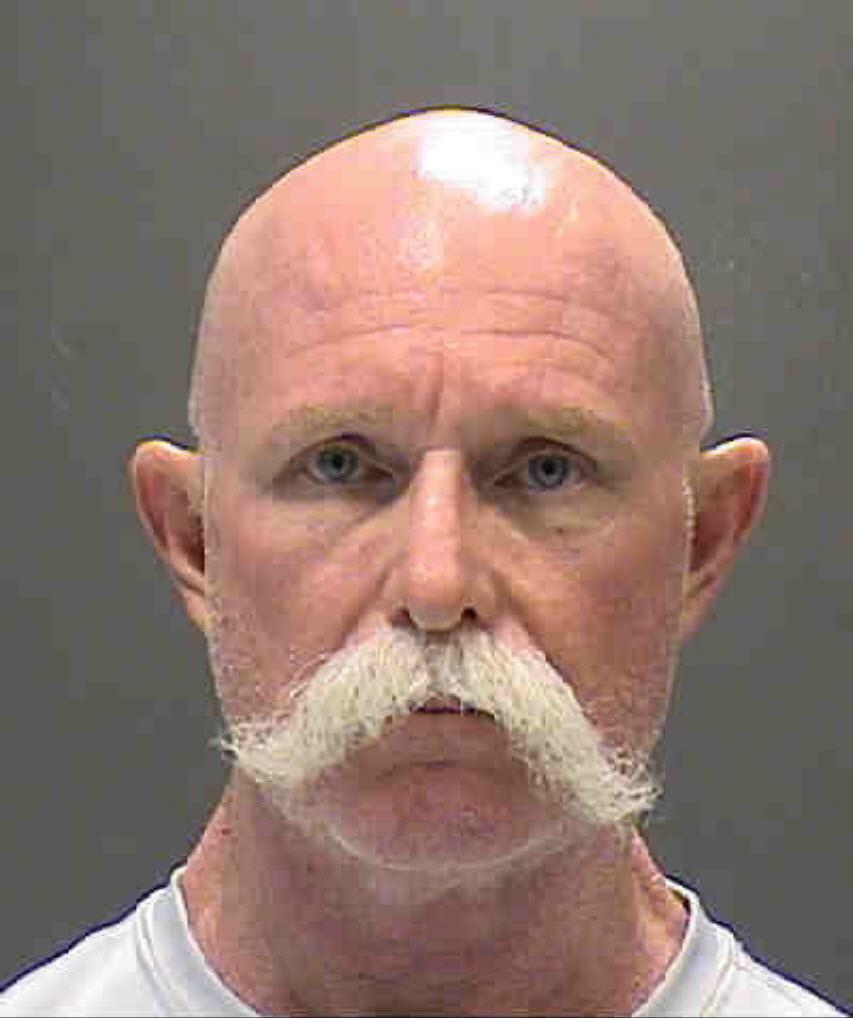
June 24 mugshot

Imprisoned on the 24th, Pyle posted a bail bond of US$90,000 (equivalent to $117,916 in 2024) and surrendered his passport to leave jail. When he failed to attend a hearing 16 months later on October 23, 2017, he became a fugitive. Despite lacking his passport, Pyle boarded a cruise ship bound for Cozumel, Mexico. When Carnival called Pyle's brother to tell him that Pyle had failed to reboard in Cozumel, bounty hunters went to search for him. Pyle was last seen in Apodoco, Nuevo León on February 16, 2018, and by June it was believed he was no longer in that nation. In June 2022, Pyle was arrested by the United States Marshals Service and Mexico's National Institute of Migration in Mérida, Yucatán, and then transferred to Marshals' custody in Miami before being returned to the Sarasota County, Florida jail.

Pyle was originally scheduled to stand trial in November 2023 on charges possessing child pornography and failure to appear. Pyle filed a motion to dismiss the charges, claiming that supporting evidence for the 2016 search warrant did not qualify as child pornography, rendering it invalid, and that any evidence obtained from thereby-unlawful searches was inadmissible. In January 2024, a Sarasota circuit judge denied Pyle's motions, citing sufficient evidence and the police probable cause affidavit. Pyle's trial was scheduled to begin the week of April 22; he instead pled guilty that day.

At a June 28 sentencing hearing, the state requested a sentence of 35 years imprisonment. Sarasota Circuit Court Judge Thomas Krug instead sentenced Pyle to 15 years for the pornography charges with a 5-year concurrent sentence for failing to appear. His sentencing also included 15 years of probation, registration as a sex offender, and successful completion of a sex offender program. As of December 27, 2025, Pyle was prisoner number 878267, imprisoned at Franklin Correctional Institution with a release date of September 22, 2036 (10 years' time).

== See also ==
- List of fugitives from justice who disappeared
